= Historical sources of the Crusades: pilgrimages and exploration =

Historical sources of the Crusades: pilgrimages and exploration include those authors whose work describes pilgrimages to the Holy Land and other explorations to the Middle East and Asia that are relevant to Crusader history. In his seminal article in the Catholic Encyclopedia, Dominican friar and historian Bede Jarrett (1881–1934) wrote on the subject of Pilgrimage, and identified that the "Crusades also naturally arose out of the idea of pilgrimages." This was reinforced by the Reverend Florentine Stanislaus Bechtel in his article Itineraria in the same encyclopedia. Pilgrims, missionaries, and other travelers to the Holy Land have documented their experiences through accounts of travel and even guides of sites to visit. Many of these have been recognized by historians, for example, the travels of ibn Jubayr and Marco Polo. Some of the more important travel accounts are listed here. Many of these are also of relevance to the study of historical geography and some can be found in the publications of the Palestine Pilgrims' Text Society (PPTS) and Corpus Scriptorum Eccesiasticorum Latinorum (CSEL), particularly CSEL 39, Itinerarium Hierosolymitana. Much of this information is from the seminal work of 19th-century scholars including Edward Robinson, Titus Tobler and Reinhold Röhricht. Recently, the Independent Crusaders Project has been initiated by the Fordham University Center for Medieval Studies providing a database of Crusaders (with sources identified) who traveled to the Holy Land independent of military expeditions.

== Overview ==
Authors who wrote about their travels or pilgrimages to the Holy Land or to the land of the Mongols were prevalent through the 16th century, and lasted into the 19th century. Some were accounts by merchants trading with non-European partners. Notable early travelers include Marco Polo, ibn Battūta, Odoric of Pordenone, John Mandeville, Bertrandon de la Broquière, Marino Sanuto the Younger, and Felix Fabri. Later travelers to include diplomats, were Jean Thenaud, Evliya Çelebi, and Richard Burton. Surveys of the Holy Land were sponsored by the Palestine Exploration Fund, beginning in 1864, including those by Claude R. Conder, Edward Hull, and Herbert Kitchener.

Collections of those works, as well as Crusader-era accounts that are in the Palestine Pilgrims' Text Society (PPTS) library (1886–1897), the Hakluyt Society (founded 1846) and the Societé de l'Orient Latin (founded 1875 by Paul Riant) that include Itinera hierosolymitana et descriptiones terrae sanctae... (1879) by Titus Tobler and Auguste Molinier; and Itinéraires à Jérusalem et descriptions de la Terre Sainte... (1882) by Henri-Victor Michelant and Gaston Raynaud. Other collections include Recueil de voyages... (1882–1916) by Charles Henri Auguste Schefer and Henri Cordier; Early Travels in Palestine (1848) by Thomas Wright; Cathay and the Way Thither (1866) by Henry Yule; and those identified in Titus Tobler's Bibliographia Geographica Palestinæ.

== Pilgrimages before the Crusades ==
Descriptions of pilgrims to the Holy Land began long before the Crusades, as early as the 3rd century AD.

Origen. Origen (c. 184 – c. 253), a Christian scholar who wrote In Joannem (Commentary on John) about the desire of Christians to search after the footprints of Christ.

Eusebius. Eusebius of Caesarea (before 265 – after 339), a historian of Christianity published in PPTS I.1.

- Historia Ecclesiastica (Church History), where a Cappadocian bishop Alexander who visited the Holy Land in the 3rd century is identified.
- Life of Constantine. Includes a description of Saint Helen's pilgrimage to the Holy Land in 326–327. Excerpted in The Churches of Constantine at Jerusalem. An earlier Christian scholar Origen (c.184 – c. 253) wrote In Joannem (Commentary on John, Vol VI) about the desire of Christians to search after the footprints of Christ. In PPTS I.1.

Itinerary of the Bordeaux Pilgrim. Itinerary from Bordeaux to Jerusalem (Itinerarium Burdigalense), an anonymous account of a pilgrimage to the Holy Land in 333–334, with travels beginning shortly after that of Saint Helen. This is the oldest known Christian itinerarium. In PPTS I.2.

Egeria. Egeria (fl. 380s), also known as Etheria or Aetheria, was a Spanish pilgrim from the 4th century.

- Itinerarium Egeriae (Pilgrimage of Aetheria). An account of Egeria's pilgrimage to the Holy Land once attributed to Saint Silvia of Aquitaine. In PPTS I.3.

Saint Jerome. Saint Jerome (c. 347–420), a Latin historian wrote of the early pilgrims to Jerusalem, some of which were published in PPTS I.4, I.5.

- Epistotlae, De Viris Illustribus and Liber Paralipumenon. An account of pilgrimages that began in the early 3rd century AD with a bishop of Caesarea named Fermilian.
- Pilgrimage of Holy Paula. A personal account of his travels with Saint Paula of Rome (347–404) and her daughter Eustochium to the Holy Land, settling in Bethlehem. Their correspondence with Saint Marcella (325–410) has been published as Letter of Paula and Eustochium to Marcella.

Socrates of Constantinople. Socrates of Constantinople (c. 380 – after 439), also known as Socrates Scholasticus, a Greek historian.

- Historia Ecclesiastica. A continuation of the work of Eusebius of Caesarea by the same title, Historia Ecclesiastica covers the church from 305 to 439, including the pilgrimage of Saint Helena, mother of Constantine the Great, and her finding relics of the True Cross, including nails and the Titulus Crucis.

Saint Eudocia. Saint Eudocia (c. 401 – 460), a Byzantine empress married to Theodosius II who went on a pilgrimage to Jerusalem in 438–439, returning with numerous holy relics. Her activities on her pilgrimage are recorded in Nicephoros Callistus' 14th-century work Historia Ecclesiastica.

Descriptions of the Holy Land in the 5th and 6th Centuries. Numerous works dating from 440 to 570 describe the geography, topography, and buildings in the Holy Land. These include: The Epitome of S. Eucherius (440); The Breviary of Jerusalem (530); Theodosius' De situ terrae sanctae, or Topography of the Holy Land (530); The Buildings of Justinian, by Procopius (500 – after 565); and The Holy Places Visited by Antoninus Martyr (c. 570), the so-called anonymous pilgrim of Piacenza. Both the Breviary and Antoninus Martyr describe the crown of thorns present in a “Basilica of Mount Zion.” In PPTS II.1–II.4.

Cosmas Indicopleustes. Cosmas Indicopleustes (fl. 6th century) was a Greek merchant and later hermit from Alexandria who made several voyages to India during the reign of Justinian. His work Christian Topography contains some of the earliest and most famous world maps.

Vita Genovefae Virginis Parisiensis. The anonymous Vita Genovefae Virginis Parisiensis was a life of Saint Geneviève of Paris written c. 520. The work relates an incident where Saint Symeon Stylites (died 459) on his pillar in Aleppo, asked for news of Geneviève and sent her a letter.

Arculf and Adomnán. Arculf (fl. late 7th century), a Frankish bishop who toured the Holy Land c. 680. Adomnán (c. 624–704) was a Scottish abbot who wrote about sacred places based on the work of Arculf. The accounts contain the second oldest known map of Jerusalem (the oldest being the Madaba Map). In PPTS III.1.

- Pilgrimage of Arculfus in the Holy Land (about the year A.D. 670).
- De locis sanctis (Concerning Sacred Places), a work by Adomnán based on Arculf's account.

Saint Wlphlagio. De Sancto Wlphlagio (7th century), a priest in the Holy Land.

- Commentatious historicus. A work discussing 7th-century pilgrims including Vulphy of Rue, was also noted by Arculf, and Saint Bercaire (died 696). Bercaire (Bercharius), the founder of the abbey of Montier-en-Der, was accompanied by a Waimer, one of the murderers of Saint Leodegar, and he returned with valuable relics that he donated to Montier-en-Der and Châlons-sur-Marne. Three centuries later, abbot Adso of Montier-en-Der (died 992), hagiographer of Bercaire, embarked on a similar pilgrimage to Jerusalem accompanying a pentinent Hilduin II, Count of Arcis-sur-Aube, but died en route.

Saint Willibald. Saint Willibald (c. 700 – c. 787), an English bishop who traveled to Holy Land sometime between 720 and 740.

- Hodoeporicon (itinerary) of Saint Willibald. An account of the travels of Willibald, dictated to an Anglo-Saxon nun named Huneberc. Willibald was the first known Englishman to travel to the Holy Land. His father Richard the Pilgrim attempted the trip but died en route. In PPTS III.2.

Commemoratorium de Casis Dei vel Monasteriis. Commemoratorium de Casis Dei vel Monasteriis is a report from 808 sent to Charlemagne tabulating all churches, monasteries, and hospices in the Holy Land. Its purpose was to allow the emperor to expeditiously distribute alms. In Descriptiones Terrae Sanctae ex saeculo VIII., IX., XII. et XV (1874) by Titus Tobler.

Peregrinatio Frotmundi. Peregrinatio Frotmundi (De S. Fromundo seu Prodomundo Espisco) is the account of a Frankish nobleman named Fromond who traveled with his brothers to Jerusalem in the mid-9th century in order to expiate a crime. Fromond is the first known penitent to travel to the Holy Land for salvation. In Acta Sanctorum (Aa. Ss.) 58.

Bernard the Pilgrim. Bernard the Pilgrim (fl. 865), a Frankish monk.

- Itinerarium of Bernard the Wise. An account of Bernard's travels to the Holy Land. In PPTS III.4.

Ahmad ibn Rustah. Ahmad ibn Rustah (died after 903), a Persian explorer and geographer who wrote a geographical compendium known as Kitāb al-A‘lāq al-Nafīsa (Book of Precious Records), describing his travels to Europe, Russia and Arabia.

Al-Maqdisi. Al-Maqdisi (c. 945 – 991), an Arab geographer, also known as Mukaddasi, whose travels were documented in PPTS III.4.

- Description of Syria (including Palestine). Translated and edited by British orientalist Guy Le Strange.
- Aḥsan al-taqāsīm fī maʿrifat al-aqālīm (The Best Divisions in the Knowledge of the Regions).

Fulk III of Anjou. Fulk III, Count of Anjou (Foulque Nerra) undertook four penitential pilgrimages to the Holy Land between 1003 and 1038.

- Gesta Consulum Andegavorum. An account of Fulk's pilgrimages, as described in Volume 1, Appendix 3 of Histoire des Croisades of Joseph Fr. Michaud.

Lietbertus. Lietbertus (1010–1076), a bishop of Cambrai who attempted a pilgrimage to Jerusalem in 1054, only reaching as far as Cyprus. This is described in Raoul of Saint-Sépulcre's Vita Lietberti (cf. Luc d'Achery, Spicilegium IX). According to Miracula Sancti Wolframni Senonensis, Lietbertus met pilgrims who had been turned away from Jerusalem. It is reported that the Muslims also ejected some 300 pilgrims from the city in 1056.

Nasir Khusraw. Nasir Khusraw (1004–1088), also known as Nasir-i-Khusrau, a Persian writer.

- Safarnāma (Book of Travels). An account of Khusraw's travels throughout the Islamic world. In PPTS IV.1.

== During the Crusader Era ==
Pilgrimages that took place during the Crusades include the following.

Henry of Portugal. Henry, Count of Portugal (c. 1066 – 1112) fought in the Reconquista with Raymond of St. Gilles and traveled to the Holy Land between 1101 and 1103. The return date is verified by the charters of his father-in-law Alfonso VI of Leon and Castile.

Sæwulf. Sæwulf, an English pilgrim who travelled to the Holy Land from 1102 to 1103.

- Pilgrimage of Sæwulf to Jerusalem and the Holy Land. In PPTS IV.2 and Thomas Wright's Early Travels in Palestine (1848).

Erik I of Denmark. Erik I of Denmark (c. 1060 – 1103) and his wife Boedil Thurgotsdatter were the first monarchs to attempt to travel to Jerusalem following the First Crusade, beginning their journey in 1103. Erik died en route in Cyprus and Boedil died in Jerusalem. Their journey is described in the Knýtlinga saga.

Hugh of Troyes. Hugh of Troyes (c. 1074 – c. 1125) was the count of Champagne who traveled three times to Jerusalem in the early 12th century. Following an assassination attempt in 1104, he left for the Holy Land where he would stay until sometime in 1107. In 1114, he made another trip to the Holy Land. He was accompanied by First Crusader Edard I of Brienne and Hugh's vassal Hugues de Payens. Hugues would later establish the Knights Templars in 1118. Hugh of Troyes returned to France in 1116, returning to Jerusalem in 1125 where he died. His travels are attested to in his many charters.

Daniel the Pilgrim. Daniel the Pilgrim (fl. c. 1107), also known as Daniel the Higumenos (abbot), was an Eastern Christian who traveled from Kievan Rus’ to the Holy Land.

- Puteshestive igumena Daniil (Life and Pilgrimage of Daniel, Higumenos from the Land of the Rus'). In PPTS IV.3.
- The Pilgrimage of the Russian Abbot Daniel to the Holy Land, 1106-1107 A.D. (1895). Edited by British archaeologist Charles W. Wilson (1836–1905).

Peter Chrysolan. Peter Chrysolan (died after 1113), also known as Grosolanus. Archbishop of Milan from 1102 to 1112 who went on a pilgrimage to the Holy Land in 1111.

- De Sancto Spiritu. An account of Chrysolan's pilgrimage including his arguments with Eustratius of Nicaea while in Constantinople. In Patrologia Latina (MPL), Volume 162, Patrologia Graeca (MPG), Volume 127.

Jindřich Zdík. Jindřich Zdík (c. 1083 – 1150), also known as Henry Zdik, was bishop of Olomouc from 1126 to 1150. He went on a pilgrimage to the Holy Land in 1137/1138. After his journey, he wrote a Descriptio Terra Sancte (Description of the Holy Places).

Fretellus. Rorgo Fretellus (fl. 1119–1154), a Frankish priest in the Kingdom of Jerusalem.

- Descriptio de locis sanctis (Description of Jerusalem and the Holy Land). A widely distributed account the city and its environs. The work, begun as early as 1128, was likely derivative of other works in the library of the cathedral of Nazareth. In PPTS V.1, as Fetellus.

Charles the Good. Charles the Good (1084–1127) was count of Flanders who traveled to the Holy Land in 1107 or 1108. His travels and subsequent murder were chronicled by Galbert of Bruges in his De multro, traditione et occisione gloriosi Karoli comitis Flandriarum, published sometime after 1128. Galbert also reported that Charles was offered the throne of the Kingdom of Jerusalem during the captivity of Baldwin II of Jerusalem in 1123, and that Charles refused.

John of Würzburg. John of Würzburg (fl. 1160s), a German priest who traveled to the Holy Land in the 1160s.

- Descriptio terrae sanctae (Description of the Holy Land). May have been written as late as 1200. His objective was to update the 7th-century De locis sanctis. In PPTS V.2.

John Phocas. John Phocas (fl. 12th century), a Byzantine traveler to the Holy Land.

- Ekphrasis of the Holy Places (Concise Description). A description of Phocas' travels to the Holy Land. In RHC Historiens grecs, Volume 1.V, and PPTS V.3.

Libellus de Locis Sanctis. Libellus de Locis Sanctis (Little Book of the Holy Places) is a 12th-century travelogue for use by pilgrims on their travels to the Holy Land written by an unknown monk named Theoderich who traveled to Palestine around 1172. In PPTS V.4.

Benjamin of Tudela. Benjamin of Tudela (1130–1173) was a Jewish Spaniard whose travels in 1166–1172 through Europe, Asia and Africa.

- The Travels of Benjamin. An account of his travels that included descriptions of Jewish colonies in Syria of the time. In Thomas Wright's Early Travels in Palestine (1848).

Orkneyinga saga. The Orkneyinga saga, also called the History of the Earls of Orkney, is a narrative of the history of the Orkney and Shetland islands and their relationship with Norway and Scotland. It was first written in the 12th century and updated several times afterward. Many of the pilgrimages of the Scandinavians are discussed in the saga.

Euphrosyne of Polotsk. Euphrosyne of Polotsk (before 1104 – 1173), a Belarus princess, the granddaughter of Vseslav the Sorcerer, who took a pilgrimage to Jerusalem c. 1173.

- Pèlerinage en Palestine de l’Abbesse Euphrosyne, Princesse de Polotsk. An account of Euphrosyne's pilgrimage to Jerusalem. There, she was received by Amalric I of Jerusalem and died in Jerusalem in 1173. Her body was placed in the Monastery of the Caves in Kiev after the conquest of Jerusalem in 1187. In ROL, Vol III, and Acta Sanctorum (Aa. Ss.) 9.

Henry the Liberal. Henry I of Troyes (1127–1181), also known as Henry the Liberal, was count of Champagne who took part in the Second Crusade. In 1179, he took a pilgrimage to Jerusalem accompanied by a group that included Peter of Courtenay, Philip of Dreux, Ertaud the Chamberlain, William Marshal (not the William Marshal below), Theobaldus de Fimis, Peter of Langres, Count Henry of Grandpré, Geoffrey (brother of Henry of Grandpré), Robert of Milly, Milo of Pevinno, William of Saint Maur and Petro Bristaudo. On his return, Henry was captured by Kilij Arslan II and ransomed by emperor Manuel I Komnenos. The account of his travels have been gleaned from his many charters.

Later Jewish Travelers. Numerous Jewish travelers went from Europe to the Holy Land in the 12th century and later. These include Samuel ben Sampson (fl. 1210) and Petachiah of Regensburg (died c. 1225). Their accounts have been documented by the 19th-century French scholar Eliakim Carmoly in his Itinéraires de la Terre Sainte (1847) and translation of Sibbub Rab Petachyah (Travels of Rabbi Petachia of Ratisbon, 1831)

Ibn Jubayr. Ibn Jubayr (1145–1217), an Arab geographer and traveler.

- Al-Rihlah (The Voyage). A description by ibn Jubayr's experiences which included his trip to Mecca from 1183 to 1185 and included travel to Egypt and Sicily. In RHC Historiens orientaux., Volume 3.
- Ibn Jubayr's Account of his Journey through Syria (1904). In Medieval Civilization: Selected Studies from European Authors by American historians Dana C. Munro and George Sellery.

Hakon Paulsson. Haakon Paulsson (died c. 1123) was a Norwegian Jarl who traveled to Jerusalem in 1120 and whose account is presented in the Orkneyinga saga written by an unknown Icelandic author.

Peter Diaconus. Peter Diaconus (1107 – c. 1140), also known as Peter the Deacon, was a librarian at the monastery of Monte Cassino and, while having never traveled to the Holy Land, wrote the travelogue Liber de Locis sancti based on the accounts of pilgrims to Jerusalem. In CSEL 39.

Nikulas of Munkethverâ. Nikulas of Munkethverâ (died 1169), an Icelandic abbot who visited Jerusalem from 1149 to 1153.

- Leiðarvisir og borgarskipan (c. 1157). An account of Nikulas' travels and is essentially a travel guide to Europe and the Holy Land for pilgrims.

Al-Harawi. Ali ibn Abi Bakr al-Harawi (died 1215), a Persian Sufi ascetic traveler.

- Al-Tadhkira al-Harawiya fi al-hiyal al-harabiya (Admonition regarding war stratagems). A work was written for al-Zahir Ghazi, sultan of Aleppo.
- Kitab al-ishara ila ma`rifat al-ziyara. A guide to pilgrimage sites.

Anthony of Novgorod. Anthony of Novgorod (1190–1232), archbishop of Novgorod.

- Description des Lieux-Saints de Constantinople (1200). Documentation of travels to Constantinople. Part of Itinéraires Russes en Orient, Société de l’Orient Latin, Série géographique.

William Marshal. William Marshal, 1st Earl of Pembroke (c. 1146 – 1219) was a knight-errant to five English kings who traveled to the Holy Land in 1184–1186. His anonymous biography Histoire de Guillaume le Maréchal was written in 1226.

Margaret of Beverley. Margaret of Beverley (died c. 1215) was an English pilgrim who participated in the Siege of Jerusalem in 1187.

- Hodoeporicon et percale Margarite Iherosolimitane. An incomplete account of Margaret's life and travels written by her brother Thomas of Froidmont.

Wilbrand of Oldenburg. Wilbrand of Oldenburg (before 1180 – 1233) was a German bishop who served as ambassador to the Kingdom of Jerusalem in 1212.

- Itinerarium terrae sanctae (Journey to the Holy Land, Reise nach Palaestina und Kleinasien in German). The account of his travels. His description of the Palace of the Ibelins in Beirut is renowned.

Morkinskinna. The Morkinskinna is an Old Norse kings' saga written in Iceland around 1220 that includes the exploits of Sigurd Jorsalfar.

Heimskringla. The Heimskringla is the most famous of the Old Norse kings' sagas written around 1225 by Icelandic historian Snorri Sturluson (1179–1241).

Giovanni da Pian del Carpine. Giovanni da Pian del Carpine (c. 1185 – 1252), also known as John Pianô del Carpine, was a Franciscan missionary who was one of the first explorers to reach the Mongol empire. His travels from 1245 to 1247 were documented in his Ystoria Mongalorum, also referred to as Historia Mongalorum quos nos Tartaros appelamus (History of Mongols and Tartars). Pian del Carpine was accompanied on his journey by Stephen of Bohemia and Benedict of Poland who wrote the short chronicle De itinere Fratrum Minorum ad Tartaros (On the Journey of the Franciscan Friars to the Tatars) and the longer Hystoria Tartarorum (History of the Tartars, or Tartar Relation). Some of the material in The Travels of Sir John Mandeville (c. 1371) is believed to have derived from del Carpine's work.

Knýtlinga saga. The Knýtlinga saga is an Icelandic work that deals with the kings of Denmark, including Erik I of Denmark, after the early 10th century. It was written in the 1250s likely by Icelandic scholar Óláfr Þórðarson.

William of Rubruck. William of Rubruck (fl. 1253 – 1255), a Flemish Franciscan missionary who accompanied Louis IX of France on the Seventh Crusade and, in 1253, set out on a journey to Mongol territory. His report of his travels called Itinerarium fratris Willielmi de Rubruquis de ordine fratrum Minorum, Galli, Anno gratiae 1253 ad partes Orientales was presented to Louis IX in 1255.

Marco Polo. Marco Polo (1254–1324) was an Italian explorer who traveled in Asia from Persia to China in 1271–1295. He documented his exploits in The Travels of Marco Polo. In particular, he wrote of the Assassins at Alamut Castle.

Rabban Bar Sauma. Rabban Bar Sauma (1220–1289) was a Turkic monk who traveled from Mongol-controlled China to Jerusalem from 1287 to 1288 and recorded his activities in The Monks of Kublai Khan, Emperor of China, translated by E. A. W. Budge. He also wrote a biography of his traveling companion Nestorian Yahballaha III. In ROL, Vol II, III.

Burchard of Mount Sion. Burchard of Mount Sion (fl. 1283) was a German friar who took a pilgrimage to the Holy Land from 1274 to 1284 and documented his travels in Descriptio Terrae Sanctae (Description of the Holy Land), one of the last detailed accounts prior to 1291. Burchard traveled to Cyprus and was received by Henry II of Jerusalem and later prepared a plan for an eventual crusade to retake Jerusalem. In PPTS XII.1.

== Pilgrimages as Crusades ==
Some pilgrimages are referred to as crusades, especially if the journey resulted in some military activity. The primary examples are the following.

Norwegian Crusade. Norwegian Crusade (1107–1110). Also known as the Crusade of Sigurd Jorsalfar, king of Norway. More of a pilgrimage than a crusade, it did include the participation in military action, with the king's forces participation in the siege of Sidon. Accompanied by Áláskr Hani, Hámundr Thorvaldsson of Vatnsfjord, and Arni Fjöruskeiv. This crusade marks the first time a European king visited the Holy Land. This crusade is described in Heimskringla, by Icelandic historian Snorri Sturluson, and in Morkinskinna.

Crusade or Pilgrimage of Fulk V of Anjou. The future king of Jerusalem Fulk V of Anjou traveled to the Holy Land from 1120 to 1122 and joined the Knights Templar, according to Ordoric Vitalis' Historia Ecclesiastica (c. 1141).

Pilgrimage of Rognvald Kali Kolsson. The pilgrimage of Rognvald Kali Kolsson (1151–1153). Also known as the Crusade of Rognvald Kali Kolsson. In 1151, Rognvald set out on a pilgrimage to the Holy Land as described in the Orkneyinga saga. The earl's party left Orkney in the late summer of 1151 in fifteen ships, with six sailing to Jerusalem while Rognvald stopped in Narbonne. After visiting Jerusalem, the party returned via Constantinople, where they were received by the emperor, then sailed to Apulia where they took horses for the journey to Rome, arriving back in Orkney in time for Christmas 1153.

Crusade or Pilgrimage of Henry the Lion. A pilgrimage to Jerusalem by Henry the Lion in 1172 was documented by Arnold of Lübeck in his Chronicae Slavorum (1209), often referred to as a crusade.

Crusade of Henry of Mecklenburg. Henry I, Lord of Mechlenburg (died 1302) went on a crusade or pilgrimage to the Holy Land c. 1275 and was captured by the Egyptians and held for 32 years. The only known reference to this is by Thomas Fuller in his Historie of the Holy Warre, where it is referred to as the Last Voyage.

== Later Travelers and Explorers ==
Kirakos Gandzaketsi. Kirakos Gandzaketsi (c. 1200 – 1271), an Armenian historian.

- The Journey of Haithon, King of Little Armenia, To Mongolia and Back (after 1254). An account of the travels of Hethum I of Armenia to the East. A 1584 edition was published by German historian Reinier Reineck (1541-1595)
- History of Armenia (1265). A summary of events from the 4th to the 12th century and a detailed description of the events of his own days.

Riccoldo da Monte di Croce. Riccoldo da Monte di Croce (c. 1243 – 1320) was an Italian Dominican friar, travel writer, missionary, and Christian apologist. He is most famous for his polemical works on Medieval Islam and the account of his missionary travels to Baghdad.

- Book of Travels (1288–1291). A guidebook for missionaries, and is a description of the Oriental countries visited.
- Letters on the Fall of Acre (1292). Five letters in the form of lamentations over the fall of Acre.

Rustichello da Pisa. Rustichello da Pisa (fl. late 13th century), an Italian romance writer who shared a prison cell with Marco Polo in Genoa.

- The Travels of Marco Polo (13th century). A travelogue of Polo's expeditions to Asia, originally known as Devisement du Monde (Description of the World). Includes a description of the Assassins and the Old Man in the Mountain.
- Voyages en Syrie de Nicolo, Maffeo & Marco Polo (1269–1271). In Itinéraires à Jérusalem et descriptions de la Terre Sainte...(1882) by French historian Henri-Victor Michelant (1811–1890).
- The Book of Ser Marco Polo, the Venetian, concerning the kingdoms and marvels of the East, 2 volumes (1903). An edition by Scottish orientalist Henry Yule (1820–1889).

Ibn Battūta. Ibn Battūta (1304–1369), a Moroccan scholar and explorer.

- Voyages (The Rihla ), 4 volumes (1534). The adventures of ibn Battūta in his visiting the Holy Land and Persia. His trip to Antioch verified that the city's fortifications had been destroyed during the siege of Antioch in 1268, but the city still had considerable population. Full title: Tuḥfat an-Nuẓẓār fī Gharāʾib al-Amṣār wa ʿAjāʾib al-Asfār (A Masterpiece to Those Who Contemplate the Wonders of Cities and the Marvels of Travelling).
- Travels of Ibn Battuta, A.D. 1325-1354 (1958). Translated by orientalists Charles Defrémery (1822–1883), Beniamino R. Sanguinetti (1811–1883) and H. A. R. Gibb (1895–1971).
- Travels in Asia and Africa, 1325–1354. Excerpts from Voyages, translated and edited by H. A. R. Gibb.

Fourteenth-century Franciscan pilgrims. Noted Franciscan pilgrims to the Holy Land and beyond in the 14th century include:

- Odoric of Pordenone (1286–1331), who wrote his Descriptio orientalium partium describing his travels in the Middle East and China from 1321 to 1329. A translation Les merveilles de la Terre d'Outremer (after 1330) was done by French monk and translator Jean de Vignay (c. 1282/1285 – c. 1350). A later translation, Les voyages en Asie au XIVe siècle du bienheureux frère Odoric de Pordenone (1891) was done by French orientalist Henri Cordier (1849–1925) and presented as Volume 10 of Recueil de voyages et de documents... . Descriptio... is also presented in Cathay and the Way Thither (1866) by Scottish orientalist Henry Yule.
- Niccolò da Poggibonsi (1345-1350), who documented his travels in Libro d'oltramare (Book of Outremer).
- Francesco Suriano (1480-1481), who wrote Tratatello delle indulgentie de Terra Sancta. An edition by Girolamo Golubovich (1865–1941) was published in 1900. The English translation, Treatise on the Holy Land, was published in 1949.
- Marco di Bartolomeo Rustici (1392–1457), a Florentine goldsmith, whose travels are documented as Dimostrazione dell'andata o viaggio al Santo Sepolcro e al Monte Sinai (1441–1442), or Codex Rustici (cf. Italian Wikipedia, Codice Rustici). An account of Rustici's journey (or voyage) to the Church of the Holy Sepulchre and Mount Sinai. (cf. Italian Wikipedia, Marco di Bartolomeo Rustici)

Francesco Balducci Pegolotti. Francesco Balducci Pegolotti (c. 1290 – 1347), a Florentine merchant and politician.

- Practica della Mercatura, 2 volumes (14th century), also known as the Merchant's Handbook or the Practice of Commerce, is a comprehensive guide to international trade in 14th-century Eurasia and North Africa.
- Cathay and the Way Thither (1866). Includes a translation and commentary of portions of Practica della Mercatura. By Scottish orientalist Henry Yule.

John Mandeville. John Mandeville (fl. 14th century), claiming to be an English knight, but more likely a Benedictine monk named Jehan a la Barbe or Jan de Langhe. An English-language edition of his work earned him the spurious credit of being “the father of English prose." (cf. French Wikipedia, Jean le Long d'Ypres)

- Les Voyages, or The Travels of Sir John Mandeville (between 1357 and 1371). A memoir of travel to the Holy Land and as far as India, beginning in 1322. The travels to Egypt and Jerusalem were under the sponsorship of Mamluk sultan al-Muzaffar Hajji, (served 1346–1347). Widely read despite its fantastical descriptions, including by Christopher Columbus. An edition of the Cotton manuscript of The Travels with modern spelling was published in 1900 by English bibliographer Alfred W. Pollard (1859–1944).
- Lapidaire de Jean de Mandeville (attribution uncertain).
- Early Travels in Palestine (1848). A collection of travel accounts by English antiquarian Thomas Wright (1810–1877) that includes a translation of portions of Les Voyages.

James of Verona. James of Verona (c. 1290 – after 1335), an Augustinian friar who made a pilgrimage to the Holy Land in 1335 and wrote an account of his travels in Latin.

- Liber peregrationis (The Book of the Pilgrimage). An account of his travels written after 1335.

Ludolf von Sudheim. Ludolf von Sudheim (fl. 1340), also known as Ludolf of Suchem, a traveler to the Holy Land from 1336 to 1341.

- De Terra sancta et itinere Iherosolomitano et de statu eius et aliis mirabilibus, que in mari conspiciuntur, videlicet mediterraneo (1350). English translation, Description of the Holy Land, and of the Way Thither, edited by Aubrey Stewart (1844–1918). Work documenting the fall of the Crusader states. In Palestine Pilgrims' Text Society (PPTS), Volume XII.3.

Giovanni de' Marignolli. Giovanni de' Marignolli (before 1290 – after 1353), an Italian traveler to China, also known as Jean de Marignolli.

- Chronicon Bohemiæ (c. 1353). Fragments of travelogue to the East reprinted in Cathay and the Way Thither(1866) by Scottish orientalist Henry Yule.

Thomas Swinburne. Sir Thomas Swinburne (c. 1357 – 1412), an English member of Parliament.

- A Traveler to the Holy Land in 1392–1393, with an unknown publication of his account. Swinburne traveled via Venice, Alexandria, Cairo, Mount Sinai and Bethlehem, reaching Jerusalem in time for Christmas 1392. After visiting Damascus he crossed Lebanon to Beirut, sailing from there to Rhodes and then home to England. (cf. account in English Travel Books.....)

John Poloner. John Poloner (fl. 1422), a German traveler.

- Description of the Holy Land (1422). In the Palestine Pilgrims' Text Society (PPTS) library and presented in Descriptiones Terrae Sanctae ex saeculo VIII., IX., XII. et XV (1874), by Swiss orientalist Titus Tobler (1806–1877).

Niccolò de' Conti. Niccolò de' Conti (c. 1395 – 1469), an Italian merchant, explorer, and writer, who traveled to India and other Asian destinations. His travels were used to help create the 1450 Fra Mauro map.

- The travels of Nicolò Conti in the East in the early part of the fifteenth century (1857), Translated from the original of Poggio Bracciolini (1380–1459), with notes, by John Winter Jones (1805–1881), Keeper of the Printed Books, British Museum. In India in the fifteenth century (1857). Translated into English, and edited, with an introduction, by English geographer Richard Henry Major (1818–1891). Issued by the Hakluyt Society, First series, Volume 22.

William Wey. William Wey (c. 1407 – 1476), an English traveller and author.

- The Itineraries of William Wey (1857). To Jerusalem, AD 1458 and AD 1462; and to Saint James of Compostella, AD 1456. From the original manuscript in the Bodleian library. Edited by Bulkeley Bandinel (1781–1861), with an introduction by English cleric, academic and antiquary George Williams (1814–1878). Printed for the Roxburghe Club, Roxburghe Club Books, Volume 76.
- Map of the Holy Land (1867). Illustrating the itineraries of William Wey, fellow of Eton in AD 1458 and 1462. In facsimile from the original in the Bodleian Library. Introduction by George Williams. Roxburghe Club Books, Volume 88.

Bertrandon de la Broquière. Bertrandon de la Broquière (1400–1459), a Burgundian spy and pilgrim.

- Voyage d'Outremer (1432–1433). An account of travels to the Holy Land and Constantinople.
- Le Voyage d’Outremer de Bertrandon de la Broquière premier écuyer tranchant et conseiller de Philippe le Bon, duc de Bourgogne (1432–1433). In Recueil de voyages et de documents..., Volume 12, edited by Charles Schefer (1820–1898).
- The Travels of Bertrandon de La Brocq́uière to Palestine, and his return from Jerusalem overland to France, during the years 1432–1433 (1807). Translation of Voyage d'Outremer, translated and edited by British writer and politician Thomas Johnes (1748–1816). With a lengthy introductory discussion on travels and pilgrimage to the Holy Land, and a critique of the later Crusades.
- L'Advis sur la Conquests de la Grece et de la Terre Sainte (1464). Opinion on the conquest of Greece and the Holy Land.
- L'Advis de Messire Jehan Torzelo (1464). Translation of a military treaty of 1440 by Giovanni Torzelo, chamberlain to the emperor of Constantinople.
- Early Travels in Palestine (1848). A collection of travel accounts by English antiquarian Thomas Wright (1810–1877) that includes a translation of portions of Voyage d'Outremer.

Ambrogio Contarini. Ambrogio Contarini (1429–1499), a Venetian nobleman, merchant and diplomat known for an account of his travel to Persia. Among his adventures was a meeting with Persian ruler Uzun Hassan.

- The journey of Ambrogio Contarini, ambassador of the illustrious signory of Venice to the great lord Ussuncassan, king of Persia, in the years 1473–1476, written by himself (1811). In A general history and collection of voyages and travels to the end of the eighteenth century (1811), Volume II, pp. 117–171. By Scottish writer and translator Robert Kerr (1757–1813).
- The journey of Ambrogio Contarini... (1873). In Travels to Tana and Persia (1873), by Giosafat Barbaro and Ambrogio Contarini. Translated from the Italian by scholar and courtier William Thomas (died 1554) for the young Edward VI of England, and edited, with an introduction by Lord Stanley of Alderley (1827–1903). Printed for the Hakluyt Society.

Giosofat Barbaro. Giosafat Barbaro (1413–1494), also known as Josafa Barbaro, a diplomat, merchant, explorer and travel writer.

- Travels to Tana and Persia, by Josafa Barbaro and Ambrogio Contarini (1873). Travelogue by G. Barbaro and Ambrogio Contarini.

Hans Lochner. Hans Lochner (died 1491), personal physician to Frederick I, Elector of Brandenburg (1371–1440) who accompanied his sons on a pilgrimage to Jerusalem in 1435.

- Beschreibung der Pilgerfahrt der Markgrafen Johann und Albrecht von Brandenburg (after 1435). An account of the pilgrimage to Jerusalem of John, Margrave of Brandenburg-Kulmbach and his younger brother Albrecht III Achilles, Elector of Brandenburg in 1435. Included with commentary in Die Hohenzollern am heiligen grabe zu Jerusalem (The Hohenzollern's at the Holy Sepulchre) (1858) by Felix Geisheim (19th century).

Marino Sanuto. Marino Sanuto (1466–1536), a Venetian historian and diarist, known as the Younger to distinguish from Marino Sanuto the Elder.

- Itinerario per la Terraferma Veneziana (1483). Sanuto accompanied his cousin Mario, who was one of the three Venetian magistrates (sindici inquisitori ) deputized to hear appeals from the decisions of the rectors (rettori), on a tour through Istria and the mainland provinces. Itinerario is an account of their travels.
- Diarii, 58 volumes. A Venetian history covering the years 1496–1533.

Felix Fabri. Felix Fabri (1441–1502), a Swiss Dominican theologian who travelled to the Holy Land.

- Evagatorium in Terrae Sanctae, Arabiae et Egypti peregrinationem (Book of the Wanderings), 3 volumes (15th century). In the Palestine Pilgrims' Text Society (PPTS) library, Volumes VII-X.

William Wey. William Wey (c. 1407 – 1476), an English traveller and author.

- The Itineraries of William Wey, fellow of Eton College, to Jerusalem, A. D. 1458 and A. D. 1462, and to Saint James of Compostelle, A. D. 1456 (after 1462).

Pietro Casola. Pietro Casola (1427–1507) was a Catholic canon who took a journey to Jerusalem in 1494, documenting his travels in a journal.

- Canon Pietro Casola's pilgrimage to Jerusalem in the year 1494 (1907). English translation with introduction and notes by Mary Margaret Newett.

William Lily. William Lily (c. 1468 – 1522), an English classical grammarian and scholar.

- Account of Travels to the Holy Land (after 1490, publication unknown). Lily went on a pilgrimage to Jerusalem, later stopping at Rhodes, which was still occupied by the Knights of Saint John, under whose protection many Greeks had taken refuge after the capture of Constantinople by the Turks. (cf. account in English Travel Books.....)

Richard Guildford. Sir Richard Guildford (Guylforde) (c. 1450 – 1506), an English courtier serving Henry VII of England, including as Master of the Ordnance.

- The Pylgrymage of Sir Richard Guylforde to the Holy Land, A.D. 1506 (after 1506). Edited by English antiquarian Henry Ellis (1777–1869).

Ludovico di Varthema. Ludovico di Varthema (c. 1470 – 1517), an Italian traveler who was one of the first non-Muslim Europeans to enter Mecca as a pilgrim.

- Itinerario de Ludouico de Varthema Bolognese (1510). An account of Lucovico's travels to Arabia, Persia, India and Southeast Asia. In Volume 9 of Recueil de voyages et de documents..., edited by French historians Charles Schefer (1820–1898) and Henri Cordier (1849–1925).

Jean Thenaud. Jean Thenaud (1480–1542/1546), a Franciscan friar and traveler. (cf. French Wikipedia, Jean Thenaud)

- Le voyage d'Outremer (Égypte, Mont Sinay, Palestine): suivi de la Relation de l'ambassade de Domenico Trevisan auprès du Soudan d'Égypte (after 1523). In 1511, Louis XII of France sent Thenaud with the ambassador to Egypt André Le Roy to meet Al-Ashraf Qansuh al-Ghuri, Mamluk sultan of Egypt, with a mission to obtain restitution of the Holy Places. At the request of Louise of Savoy, mother to future king Francis I of France, Thenaud went to Bethlehem and left an offering of gold, incense and myrrh at Christ's manger. He continued on to India, curtailing his trip to Persia due to an issue with Bagrat III of Georgia.
- Ibid. In Volume 5 of Recueil de voyages et de documents..., edited by French historians Charles Schefer (1820–1898) and Henri Cordier (1849–1925).

Denis Possot. Denis Possot (16th century), a French monk and traveler.

- Le voyage de la Terre sainte (1532). In Volume 11 of Recueil de voyages et de documents..., edited by French historians Charles Schefer (1820–1898) and Henri Cordier (1849–1925).

Andrew Boorde. Andrew Boorde (c. 1490 – 1549), an English traveler, physician and writer.

- Itinerary of Travel to Jerusalem (1538). Delivered to Thomas Cromwell, minister to Henry VIII of England, but the manuscript was lost. (cf. account in English Travel Books.....)

Jérôme Maurand. Jérôme Maurand (16th century), a French priest of Antibes.

- Itinéraire d'Antibes à Constantinonple (1544). In Volume 17 of Recueil de voyages et de documents..., edited by French historians Charles Schefer (1820–1898) and Henri Cordier (1849–1925).

Jean Chesneau. Jean Chesneau (fl. 1520–1553), a French writer and secretary to Gabriel de Luetz d'Aramon, the French ambassador to the Ottoman Empire.

- Le Voyage de Monsieur d'Aramon dans le Levant (c. 1553). In Volume 8 of Recueil de voyages et de documents..., edited by French historians Charles Schefer (1820–1898) and Henri Cordier (1849–1925).

Anthony Jenkinson. Anthony Jenkinson (1529–1611), an English merchant, sea-captain, traveler, and explorer on behalf of the Muscovy Company. In 1546, Jenkinson was sent into the Levant as training for a mercantile career. Later, he visited Turkey, Western Asia, the Holy Land and Cyprus.

- An Account of the Ottoman Sultan (1553). While in Aleppo, Jenkinson wrote an account of the arrival of Suleiman the Magnificent. From Suleiman, he obtained safe-conduct, permitting him to freely trade in Turkish ports.
- Early Voyages and Travels to Russia and Persia, 2 volumes (after 1598). By A. Jenkinson and other Englishmen. An account of the first intercourse of the English with Russia and Central Asia by way of the Caspian Sea. The associated map was incorporated into Ortalius' Theatrum Orbis Terrarum.

Noé Bianco. Noé Bianco (died 1568), a Venetian traveler and merchant, also known as Joanne Cola.

- Viaggio da Venetia al Santo Sepolcro (1566). An account of a journey to Jerusalem, with depictions of sites that included Solomon's Temple and the Church of the Holy Sepulchre.

Antoine Regnaut. Antoine Regnaut (fl. late 16th century), a French merchant and writer. Regnaut traveled to Jerusalem in 1549 and was dubbed Knight of the Holy Sepulchre.

- Discours du Voyage d'Outre mer au Sainct Sepulcre de Jérusalem et autres lieux de la terre saincte (1573). An account of the overseas voyage to the Church of the Holy Sepulchre of Jerusalem and other places of the Holy Land.

Richard Hakluyt. Richard Hakluyt (1553–1616), an English author, editor and translator. Recognizing his contributions, the Hakluyt Society was founded in 1846, printing rare and unpublished accounts of voyages and travels.

- The Principal Navigations, Voiages, Traffiques and Discoueries of the English Nation, 10 volumes (1589–1600).
- The Principal Navigations (1598–1600), 14 volumes (after 2020). A critical edition is under preparation for Oxford University Press.

Samuel Purchas. Samuel Purchas (c. 1577 – 1626), an English cleric who published a twenty-volume set of reports by international travelers.

- Hakluytus posthumus (1905–1907). Also known as: Purchas His Pilgrimes, Contayning a History of the World in Sea Voyages and Lande Travells by Englishmen and others. Volume I discusses ancient peregrinatio and other travels. Volumes II–VI discuss the early European voyages to America, Africa and the Orient. Volume VII discusses pilgrimages to Jerusalem, and travels to Ethiopia and Egypt. Volume XIII discusses peregrinatio and travels by land to Palestine, Anatolia, Syria, Armenia, Persia, India, Arabia, and other inland countries of Asia by Englishmen and others, modern and ancient.

Henry Timberlake. Henry Timberlake (1570–1625), a London ship captain and merchant adventurer. Timberlake traveled on his ship, the Troyan, to Egypt in 1601, and proceeded on land to Jerusalem.

- A True and Strange discourse on the travailes of two English Pilgrims (1603). An account of the author's travels from Cairo to Jerusalem accompanied by John Burrell of Middlesbrough, a 50-day journey. Provides topographical details of the surroundings of Jerusalem as well as Bethel, Gilead, Nazareth and other towns. In the collection Two Journeys to Jerusalem by Nathaniel Crouch (born 1632).

George Sandys. George Sandys (1578–1644), an English traveler, colonist, poet, and translator. Sandys' writings influenced contemporary literature and other disciplines including art, archaeology and geography. Sandys is considered to be the first English Egyptologist.

- A Relation of a Journey begun an. Dom. 1610, 4 volumes (1615). The account of an extended tour of Europe and the Middle East in 1610–1612, giving detailed accounts of Constantinople, Cairo, Jerusalem, Emmaus, Bethlehem and Nazareth.
- A General History of the Ottoman Empire (1740). Including Turkey, Egypt, the Holy Land, Jerusalem, Palestine and Arabia. Conjecture as to the fate of the Ten Lost Tribes of Israel.
- Sandys' Travels: Containing a history of the original and present state of the Turkish empire (1673). The Mahometan religion a nd ceremonies. A description of Constantinople ... Also, of Greece ... Of Ægypt, the antiquities, hieroglyphics... Of Armenia, Grand Cairo, Rhodes, Pyramids, colossus...A description of the Holy Land ... Lastly, Italy described, and the islands adjoining. Illustrated with fifty graven maps and figures (7th edition).

Thomas Herbert. Sir Thomas Herbert, 1st Baronet (1606–1682), an English historian and explorer of Persia and the Far East.

- Description of the Persian Monarchy now beinge: the Orientall Indyes, Iles and other parts of the Greater Asia and Africk (1634).
- Some Yeares Travels into Africa and Asia the Great (1638). A reissue of Description of the Persian Monarchy...with corrections. Regarded as among the best records of 17th-century travel. Illustrations include sketches of the dodo, cuneiform inscriptions and Persepolis.
- Travels in Persia, 1627–1629 (after 1638). Abridged and edited by British historiographer William Foster (1863–1951) in a 1928 edition.

Fynes Moryson. Fynes Moryson (1566–1630), an English traveler.

- An Itinerary, 4 volumes (1671). Containing his ten yeeres travell through the twelve dominions of Germany, Bohmerland, Sweitzerland, Netherland, Denmarke, Poland, Italy, Turky, France, England, Scotland & Ireland. Volumes 1 and 2 discuss Jerusalem, with a map of Jerusalem and surrounding areas, and a diagram of the Church of the Holy Sepulcher.

Gabriel Sionita. Gabriel Sionita (1577–1648), a Lebanese Maronite orientalist and author.

- Geographia Nubiensis (1619). A translation of De geographia universali, or Nuzhat al-Mushtaq, by Arab geographer Muhammad al-Idrisi (1100–1165). Sionita included an appendix, De nonnvilis Orientativm vrbibvs, nec non indigenarvm religione ac moribus tractatus breuis, to his translation.
- Arabia, seu, Arabum vicinarumq[ue] gentium Orientalium leges, ritus, sacri et profani mores, instituta et historia(1633). Laws of the Eastern rites, sacred and profane behavior, institutions and history is also near several routes through Arabia, containing many noteworthy accounts. Includes works by Flemish antiquarian Jan van Cootwijk (died 1629) and Arab historian Yūḥannā al- Ḥaṣrūnī (died 1626).

Evliya Çelebi. Evliya Çelebi (1611–1682), a Turkish explorer who traveled throughout the Ottoman Empire and surrounding lands over a period of 40 years.

- Seyahatname, 10 volumes (late seventeenth century). Account in Turkish of Çelebi's travels in Europe, Asia and Africa.
- Narrative of travels in Europe, Asia, and Africa, in the seventeenth century, 2 volumes (1834). English language translation of the first two volumes of Celebi's travelogue Seyahatname. Translation by Austrian orientalist Joseph von Hammer-Purgstal (1774–1856).

Jean de Thévenot. Jean de Thévenot (1633–1667), a French traveler in the East and a linguist, natural scientist and botanist.

- Relation d'un voyage fait au Levant, 3 volumes (1665). Report of a trip to the Levant, Persia and India.
- L'Empire du Grand Turc: vu par un sujet de Louis XIV (date unknown). The Empire of the Grand Turk, as seen by a subject of Louis XIV. Originally published as Volume 1 of Thévenot's Relation d'un voyage fait au Levant .
- Voyage en Europe, Asie & Afrique: divisez en trois parties, 5 volumes (3rd edition, 1727).

Nathaniel Crouch/Robert Burton. Nathaniel Crouch (born c. 1632), an English printer, bookseller and historical author. Crouch wrote under the pseudonym Robert or Richard Burton (sometimes, R.B.).

- Two Journeys to Jerusalem (after 1669). (1) A True and Strange discourse on the travailes of two English Pilgrims (1603) by adventurer Henry Timberlake (1570–1625); and (2) The travels of fourteen Englishmen in 1669, to Jerusalem, Bethlem, Jericho, the river Jordan, the lake of Sodom and Gomorrah; A description of the Holy Land, its situation, fertility, etc.; several essays on the Jews in Palestine.
- A Journey to Jerusalem (1796 printing). Containing the Travels of Fourteen Englishmen in 1667. To which is premised, memorable remarks upon the Ancient and Modern state of the Jewish Nation. In eight parts: I. A Description of the Holy Land; II. The Ten Captivities of the Jews (cf. Assyrian captivity, Babylonian captivity, and Roman captivity); III; Conjectures Concerning the Ten Lost Tribes of Israel; IV. State of the Jews and Present Condition of Palestine; V. The Septuagint; VI. The Travels of Fourteen Englishmen to Jerusalem, in the year 1609, in a letter from Aleppo; VII; The (fictional) Jewish Council of 1650 in Hungary, by Samuel Beert; and, VIII. The Counterfeit Messiah at Symrna in 1666 (cf. Sabbatai Zevi and Chapter IV, Volume 5 of History of the Jews).

George Wheler. Sir George Wheler (1651–1724), an English clergyman and travel writer.

- Voyage d'Italie, de Dalmatie, de Grece, et du Levant: fait aux années 1675 & 1676, 2 volumes (1676). With archaeologist Jacob Spon (1647–1685).
- A Journey into Greece, 6 books (1682). In the company of Dr. Spon, of Lyons, in six books containing: I. A Voyage from Venice to Constantinople; II. An Account of Constantinople and the adjacent places; III. A Voyage to the Lesser Asia; IV. A Voyage from Zant through several parts of Greece to Athens; V. An Account of Athens; VI. Several journeys from Athens into Attica, Corinth, Boeotia, etc. With variety of sculptures.

Gabriel Gerberon. Gabriel Gerberon (1628–1711), a Jansenist monk at the abbey of St. Denis.

- Histoire de la robe sans couture de N. S. Jésus-Christ, qui est révérée dans l'église des Bénédictins d'Argenteuil(1676). An account of the seamless robe of Jesus, found in Jerusalem by Saint Helena, and given to Charlemagne, eventually winding up at the Basilique Saint-Denys in Argenteuil. An alternate story is that Helena gave the Holy Gown (Heiliger Rock) to Saint Agricius (c. 260 – c. 335), the first known bishop of Trier.

Other 17th and 18th Century Travelers. Lesser-known English travelers to the Middle East in the 17th and 18th centuries include the following.

- William Harborne (c. 1542 – 1617), English ambassador to the Ottoman Empire. Harborne's travels are described in three accounts in Richard Hakluyt's The Principal Navigations...
- Thomas Coryat (c. 1577 – 1617), an English traveler. His travels to Turkey, Persia and India are summarized in the later editions of the travelogue Coryat's Crudities, 3 volumes (1611).
- William Lithgow (1582 – c. 1645), a Scottish traveller, writer and alleged spy. His account of his travels to Egypt and the Holy Land are documented in his Travels & voyages through Europe, Asia, and Africa, for nineteen years(1640).
- Sir Henry Blount (1602–1682), an English knight, traveller and author. His account Voyage into the Levant(1634) covers his travels in 1633–1634.
- Ellis Veryard (1657-1714), an English physician who traveled to Egypt, recording his account in Voyages en Egypte pendant les années 1678-1701 (after 1701).
- Charles Perry (1698–1780), an English traveler and medical writer. He traveled to the East from 1739 to 1742, recording his account in A View of the Levant: particularly of Constantinople, Syria, Egypt, and Greece (1743).
- Giovanni Filippo Mariti (1736–1806), an Italian traveler who wrote Travels through Cyprus, Syria, and Palestine; with a general history of the Levant, 2 volumes (1792).
- Salvator (Sauveur) Lusignan (fl. late 18th century), a French biographer and traveler whose adventures were documented in his Journey to Turkey and part of the Levant: With a description of Palestine (1789).
- John Antes (1740–1811), an American composer of chamber music, instrument maker and missionary to Egypt. He described his experiences there in his Observations on the manners and customs of the Egyptians: the overflowing of the Nile and its effects (1800).

Cornelis de Bruijn. Cornelis de Bruijn (1652 – c. 1727), a Dutch artist and traveler.

- Voyage au Levant, 5 volumes (1700). An account of travel to the principal places of Asia Minor, in the isles of Chios, Rhodes, and Cyprus as well as in the most considerable cities of Egypt, Syria and the Holy Land. De Bruijn's trip ended in 1693 and among his drawings were the first of the interiors of the pyramids and of Jerusalem.

Laurent d'Arvieux. Laurent d'Arvieux (1635–1702), a French traveler and diplomat. From 1658 to 1666, traveled to the Levant and later served as consul to Aleppo from 1679 to 1686.

- Voyage dans la Palestine (before 1702 ). Memoirs, published posthumously in 1717, edited by Jean de la Roque (1661–1745).
- The Travels of the Chevalier d'Arvieux in Arabia the Desart (1732). An expanded edition of Voyage dans la Palestine, translated and edited by J. de la Roque. Includes A General Description of Arabia, extracted from Taqwim al-Buldan (A Sketch of the Countries) by the Kurdish historian Abu'l-Feda (1273–1331).

Henry Maundrell. Henry Maundrell (1665–1701), an English academic and cleric who served as chaplain to the Levant Company in Syria.

- A Journey from Aleppo to Jerusalem at Easter, A.D. 1697 (1703). An account of travel to the Holy Land in 1697. Later editions included journals of Maundrell's and A Journey from Grand Cairo to Mount Sinai, and back againby Robert Clayton (1695–1758).
- A Journey to the Banks of the Euphrates at Beer, and to the Country of Mesopotamia (1714). Earlier journals from the 1697 trip to the Holy Land originally published in 1699. Appended to A Journey from Aleppo... in the 3rd edition of the work.
- Early Travels in Palestine (1848). A collection of travel accounts by English antiquarian Thomas Wright (1810–1877) that includes Maundrell's Journey.

Jean de la Roque. Jean de la Roque (1661–1745), a French traveler and journalist. (cf. French Wikipedia, Jean de Laroque)

- Voyage dans l’Arabie heureuse, fait de 1708 à 1710, par l’Océan-Оriental et le détroit de la mer Rouge, avec la relation d’un Voyage fait du port de Moka à la cour d’Yémen, de 1711 à 1713 (1716).
- Voyage en Syrie et au mont Liban (1722). An account of the author's experiences in the Levant in 1689. Includes a description of customs of regional tribes, and information on the ruins at Baalbek.
- A Voyage to Arabia the Happy (1726). Translation of Voyage dans l’Arabie heureuse... By the way of the Eastern Ocean, and the streights of the Red-Sea: perform'd by the French for the first time, A.D. 1708, 1709, 1710 : together with a particular relation of a journey from the port of Moka to the court of the King of Yemen, in the second expedition, A.D. 1711, 1712, 1713 : also, an account of the coffee-tree, and its fruit.
- The Travels of the Chevalier d'Arvieux in Arabia the Desart (1732). An expanded edition of Voyage dans la Palestine by Laurent d'Arvieux (1635–1702), translated and edited by J. de la Roque. Includes A General Description of Arabia, extracted from Taqwim al-Buldan (A Sketch of the Countries) by the Kurdish historian Abu'l-Feda (1273–1331).

Thomas Shaw. Thomas Shaw (1694–1751), an English cleric and traveler.

- Travels, or Observations relating to several parts of Barbary and the Levant (1738).
- Two supplements in response to Richard Pococke's criticism. Incorporated in later editions.

John Montagu. John Montagu, 4th Earl of Sandwich (1718–1792), a British statesman.

- A Voyage Performed by the late Earl of Sandwich: Round the Mediterranean, in the years 1738 and 1739 (published after 1740). Written by himself ... To which are prefixed, memoirs of the noble author's life.

Robert Clayton. Robert Clayton (1695–1758), an Irish Protestant bishop.

- A Journey from Grand Cairo to Mount Sinai, and back again (1753). In Company with some Missionaries de propaganda Fide. Translated from a manuscript written by the Prefetto of Egypt... To which are added remarks on the origin of hieroglyphics and the mythology of the ancient Heathens. Included in an 1810 edition of Henry Maundrell's A Journey from Aleppo...

Alexander Drummond. Alexander Drummond (died 1769), a Scottish author and British consul to Aleppo.

- Travels through different cities of Germany, Italy, Greece and several parts of Asia, as the far as the banks of the Euphrates (1754). Written in a series of letters.

Pierre Joseph de Beauchamp. Pierre Joseph de Beauchamp (1752–1801), a French missionary, diplomat, geographer and astronomer. Also known as Abbé de Beauchamp. (cf. Norwegian Wikipedia, Pierre Joseph de Beauchamp)

- Observations faites en Syrie (1782). In Journal des Sçavans, l'Année M.DCC.LXXXII.
- Voyage de Bagdad à Bassora le long de l'Euphrate (1785). In Journal des Sçavans, l'Année M.DCC.LXXXV.
- Relation d'un voyage en Perse (1790). In Journal des Sçavans, l'Année M.DCC.LXXXX. Translated edition: Travels in Persia published in A Collection of Late Voyages and Travels (1797) by Scottish writer Robert Heron (1764–1807).

Louis-François de Ferrières-Sauvebeuf. Louis-François, count of Ferrières-Sauvebeuf (1762–1814), a French diplomat and adventurer. Recruited to take charge of secret missions in the Middle East and was assassinated in 1814. (cf. French Wikipedia, Louis-François de Ferrières-Sauvebeuf)

- Mémoires historiques, politiques et géographiques des voyages du comte de Ferrières-Sauvebœuf, 2 volumes (1790). Done in Turkey, Persia and Arabia, from 1782 until 1789: with his observations on the religion, manners, character and commerce of these three nations: followed by very exact details on the war of the Turks with the two imperial courts, Austria and Russia, the dispositions of the three armies, and the results of their campaigns.
- Travels of M. de Ferrières-Sauvebœuf (1797). Translation of portions of Mémoires historiques in A Collection of Late Voyages and Travels (1797) by Scottish writer Robert Heron (1764–1807).

Robert Heron. Robert Heron (1764–1807), a Scottish writer.

- A Collection of Late Voyages and Travels (1797). Translated and abridged from the French and other foreign publications of Carsten Niebuhr (1733–1815), Giovanni F. Mariti (1736–1806), Abbé de Beauchamp (1752–1801), among others. The whole forming a body of important and amusing information, concerning the present state of society and manners, of arts and literature, of religion and government, the appearances of nature, and the works of human industry in Persia, Arabia, Turkey.
- Travels through Arabia and other Countries in the East, 2 volumes (1776–1780), by C. Niebuhr. Translation of Voyage en Arabie and en d'autres pays circonvoisins by R. Heron.

William George Browne. William George Browne (1768–1813), an English traveler of Egypt and the Near East.

- Travels in Africa, Egypt and Syria, from the years 1792 to 1798 (1800).

Gilles Boucher de La Richarderie. Gilles Boucher de La Richarderie (1733–1810), a French historian.

- Bibliothèque universelle des voyages, 6 volumes (1808). Universal Travel Library, or Complete and reasoned record of all ancient and modern journeys in the different parts of the world, published in both French and foreign languages, listed in order of country in their chronological series; with more or less rapid extracts from the most esteemed trips of each country, and motivated judgments on the old relationships which have the most celebrity (translated). Used as a source for Bibliographia Geographica Palestinæ (1867) by Swiss orientalist Titus Tobler (1806–1877).

François-René de Chateaubriand. François-René, vicomte de Chateaubriand (1768–1848), a French writer, politician, diplomat and historian.

- Itinéraire de Paris à Jérusalem et de Jérusalem à Paris, 3 volumes (1811). Going through Greece, and coming back through Egypt, Barbary and Spain. Used as a source for Tobler's Bibliographia Geographica Palestinæ(1867).
- Travels to Jerusalem and the Holy Land: through Egypt, 3 volumes (1811). Translation of Chateaubriand's work by English writer Frederic Shoberl (1775–1853).

Frederic Shoberl. Frederic Shoberl (1775–1853), an English journalist, editor, translator, writer and illustrator.

- Travels to Jerusalem and the Holy Land: through Egypt, 3 volumes (1811). Translation of Chateaubriand's work by F. Shoberl.
- The Hunchback of Notre-Dame (1849). A new edition of Victor Hugo's work translated by F. Shoberl.

Ernst Friedrich Karl Rosenmüller. Ernst Friedrich Karl Rosenmüller (1768–1835), a German orientalist and theologian.

- Reis in Palestina: Syrië en Egypte, gedaan in het jaar 1817 (1822). Journey in Palestine: Syria and Egypt, done in the year 1817.
- Handbuch der Biblischen Alterthumskunde, 4 volumes (1823–1831). Handbook of biblical antiquity, concerning the geography, flora, fauna and mineralogy of the Holy Land, Arabia and Central Asia. Used as a source for Tobler's Bibliographia Geographica Palestinæ (1867).
- Biblical Geography of Asia Minor, Phoenicia, and Arabia (1836). Volume 1 of Handbuch der Biblischen Alterthumskunde.
- The Biblical Geography of Central Asia, 2 volumes (1836–1837). Volumes 2 and 3 of Handbuch der Biblischen Alterthumskunde. With a general introduction to the study of sacred geography, including the antediluvian period. Translated by Scottish historian Nathaniel Morren (1798–1847).
- Mineralogy and Botany of the Bible (1840). Volume 4 of Handbuch der Biblischen Alterthumskunde.

Robert Kerr. Robert Kerr (1757–1813), a Scottish surgeon, writer on scientific subjects, and translator.

- A General History and Collection of Voyages and Travels, arranged in systematic order, 18 volumes (1811). Forming a complete history of the origin and progress of navigation, discovery and commerce, by sea and land, from the earliest ages to the present time. Volume II, Chapter XX: Account of various early pilgrimages from England to the Holy Land, between the years 1097 and 1107

Joachim Heinrich Jäck. Joachim Heinrich Jäck (1777–1847), a German librarian and historian. (cf. German Wikipedia, Heinrich Joachim Jaeck)

- Taschen-Bibliothek der wichtigsten und interessantesten Reisen durch Aegypten, 87 volumes (1828–1836). Pocket library of the most important and interesting journeys through Egypt. Volume 3, a short and cursory overview of the trips to Palestine over the previous 1500 years, was used as a source for Tobler's Bibliographia Geographica Palestinæ (1867).

William Martin Leake. William Martin Leake (1777–1860), an English officer, topographer, diplomat, antiquarian and author.

- Travels in the Morea: With a map and plans, 3 volumes (1830).
- Travels in Northern Greece, 4 volumes (1835).
- Peloponnesiaca: A Supplement to Travels in the Morea (1846).

Julius Petzholdt. Julius Petzholdt (1812–1891), a German bibliographer. (cf. German Wikipedia, Julius Petzholdt)

- Neuer Anzeiger für Bibliographie und Bibliothekwissenschaft, 46 volumes (1840–1886). Jahrgang 1861 contains Verzeichniss einer Sammlung von Reisen in's Heilige Land (Directory of a collection of trips to the Holy Land).

Ludovic Lalanne. Ludovic Lalanne (1815–1898), a French historian and librarian.

- Les Pèlerinages en Terre Sainte avant les Croisades (1845). Pilgrimages to the Holy Land before the Crusades, with a chronology covering from Saint Helen's in 325 (sic ) through Peter the Hermit in 1096. Used as a source for Tobler's Bibliographia Geographica Palestinæ (1867).
- Essai sur le feu grégeois et sur la poudre à canon (1845). An essay on Greek fire and gunpowder.

Xavier Marmier. Xavier Marmier (1808–1892), a French author and traveler.

- Du Rhin au Nil: Tyrol, Hongrie, Provinces Danubiennes, Syrie, Palestine, Égypte: souvenirs de voyages, 2 volumes (1847). Used as a source for Tobler's Bibliographia Geographica Palestinæ (1867).
- Voyages et littérature. Mémoire sur la découverte de l'Amérique au Xe Siècle. Valachie et Moldavie. Un voyage en Perse. Le Pays des Cosaques. Tradition d'Allemagne. Eric XIV (1888). Includes an account of a trip to Persia.

Thomas Wright. Thomas Wright (1810–1877), an English antiquarian and writer.

- Early Travels in Palestine (1848). Translations of works by Arculf (fl. 700), Saint Willibald (721–727), Bernard the Wise (867), Sæwulf (1102 and 1103), Sigurd the Crusader (1107–1111), Benjamin of Tudela (1170–1173), John Mandeville (1322–1356), Bertrandon de la Broquière (1432 and 1433) and Henry Maundrell (1697). With a map of Jerusalem.
- Early Christianity in Arabia: a historical essay (1855).
- The History of France: from the earliest period to the present time, 3 volumes (1856–1862). Volume 1 discusses the Crusades.
- Essays on Archaeological Subjects: and on various questions connected with the history of art, science and literature in the Middle Ages (1861).
- La Morte d'Arthure: The history of King Arthur and of the Knights of the Round Table (1889). An edition of Le Morte d'Arthur by Sir Thomas Malory (c. 1415 – 1471).

Valérie de Gasparin. Valérie Boissier, comtesse de Gasparin (1813–1894), a Swiss woman of letters and writer on religion, social topics and travel.

- Journal d'un Voyage au Levant, 3 volumes (1848). The journal of Boissier's journey to the East from 1847 to 1848, written in a casual style. Volume 1 covers travels in Greece. Volume 2 is concerned with Egypt and the Nubian region. Volume 3 covers the Holy Land, including Jerusalem, Nazareth, Sidon and Tyre.

Gerhard Heinrich van Senden. Gerhard Heinrich van Senden (1793–1851), a Dutch traveler.

- Het Heilige Land, of Mededeelingen uit eene reis naar het oosten, gedaan in de jaren 1849 en 1850 (1851). The Holy Land, or Communications from a Voyage to the East, Made in the Years 1849 and 1850, In Company of Her Royal Highness, the Princess Marianne of the Netherlands. Used as a source for Tobler's Bibliographia Geographica Palestinæ (1867).

Richard H. Major. Richard Henry Major (1818–1891), an English geographer.

- India in the fifteenth century (1857). A collection of narratives of voyages to India in the century preceding the Portuguese discovery of the Cape of Good Hope. From Latin, Persian, Russian, and Italian sources. Issued by the Hakluyt Society, First series, Volume 22.

Henri-Victor Michelant. Henri-Victor Michelant (1811–1890), a French librarian, Romanist and medievalist. (cf. French Wikipedia, Henri-Victor Michelant)

- Gui de Bourgogne and Floovant: chanson de geste (1859).
- Itinéraires à Jérusalem et descriptions de la Terre Sainte, rédigés en français aux XIe, XIIe [et] XIIIe siècles(1882). Itineraries in Jerusalem and descriptions of the Holy Land, written in French in the 11th, 12th and 13th centuries. Includes: Le Pèlerinage de Charlemagne (c. 1140), a chanson de geste; an 1180 list of patriarchs of Jerusalem and Antioch; the anonymous L’état de la cité de Jerusalem (1187); accounts from Ernoul's Chroniqueon Jerusalem and Galilee (1231); an anonymous account Pilgrimages to Jerusalem (1231); Description rimée des Saints Louix (1241) by Philippe Mouskes; Itinéraire de Londres à Jérusalem (1244) by Matthew Paris; La Sainte cité de Jerusalem, les Saints Lieux & le Pelerinage de la Terre (1261), from the Rothelin Continuation; an anonymous account Les Chemins & les Pelerinages de la Terre Sainte (c. 1265); Voyages en Syrie de Nicolo, Maffeo & Marco Polo (1269–1271), by Rustichello da Pisa; a guidebook Pelerinages et Pardouns de Acre (1280); La Devise des Chemins de Babiloine (1289–1291); and Les cafaus de Sur (1291). With French historian Gaston Raynaud (1850–1911), and an introduction by Paul E. D. Riant (1836–1888).

C. W. M. van de Velde. Charles William Meredith van de Velde (1818–1898), a Dutch painter, cartographer and missionary.

- Narrative of a Journey through Syria and Palestine in 1851 and 1852, 2 volumes (1854).
- Van de Velde maps of Palestine and Jerusalem (1858). An important scientific mapping of Palestine and Jerusalem.
- Planography of Jerusalem (1858), by Titus Tobler (1806–1877). A memoir to accompany the new-ground-plan of the city of Jerusalem and the environs, constructed anew by C. W. M. van de Velde.

Justin Taylor (Laorti-Hadji). Baron Isidore Justin Séverin Taylor (1789–1879), a French theater producer, traveler and author. Known as Laorti-Hadji in numerous sources including Tobler's Bibliographia Geographica Palestinæ.

- La Syrie, l'Égypte, la Palestine et la Judée (1839). An account of his travels to the Near East, illustrated with the author's watercolors (cf. his collection at the Victoria and Albert Museum)
- Histoire de l'état présent de Jérusalem, par l'abbé Mariti (1853). An edition of Giovanni Mariti's work published by Laorti-Hadji (Baron Taylor).
- La Syrie, la Palestine et la Judée, pèlerinage à Jérusalem et aux lieux saints (1854).
- L'Égypte (1857). An account of the author's travel to Egypt in 1828.

Richard Francis Burton. Sir Richard Francis Burton (1821–1890), a British explorer, writer, translator and Arabist.

- Personal Narrative of a Pilgrimage to Al Madinah and Meccah, 3 volumes (1855–1856). Edited by Lady Isabel Burton (1831–1896), with an introduction by British orientalist Stanley E. Lane-Poole (1854–1931).
- Unexplored Syria (1872). Visits to the Libanus, the Tulúl el Safá, the Anti-Libanus, the northern Libanus, and the 'Aláh.
- The Book of the Thousand Nights and a Night, 10 volumes (1885). Subtitled: A Plain and Literal Translation of the Arabian Nights Entertainments. English translation of One Thousand and One Nights (Arabian Nights), a collection of Middle Eastern and South Asian stories compiled during the eighth through thirteenth centuries.
- Supplemental Nights to the Book of the Thousand Nights and a Night, 6 volumes (1886–1888).
- Burton's review of Charles M. Doughty's Travels in Arabia Deserta (1888). The Academy, Vol. XXXIV (28 July), pp. 47–48.
- The life of Captain Sir Richard F. Burton (1893). A biography by Lady Burton.
- An annotated bibliography of Sir Richard Francis Burton, K. C. M. G. (1923). A bibliography of Burton's workscompiled by orientalist Norman M. Penzer (1892–1960).

Alessandro Bassi. Alessandro Bassi (19th century), an Italian traveler.

- Pellegrinaggio storico e descrittivo di Terrasanta, 2 volumes (1856–1857). A historical and descriptive pilgrimage of the Holy Land. In Tobler's Bibliographia Geographica Palestinæ.

Felix Geisheim. Felix Geisheim (19th century), a German historian featured in Tobler's Bibliographia Geographica Palestinæ.

- Die Hohenzollern am heiligen grabe zu Jerusalem (1858). The Hohenzollerns at the Holy Sepulchre. An account of the pilgrimage to Jerusalem of John, Margrave of Brandenburg-Kulmbach, and his younger brother Albrecht III Achilles, Elector of Brandenburg, in 1435. Based on the writings of Hans Lochner, the personal physician of Albrecht's father.

Horatius Bonar. Horatius Bonar (1808–1889), a Scottish churchman, traveler and poet featured in Bibliographia Geographica Palestinæ.

- The Land of Promise: Notes of a Spring Journey from Beersheba to Sidon (1858). Includes appendices on the topography of Jerusalem, bibliography of topographical studies of Palestine, and a cross-reference to Scripture.

Avraam Sergi︠e︡evich Norov. Avraam Sergi︠e︡evich Norov (Abraham von Noroff) (1795-1869), a Russian historian.

- Meine reise nach Palästina, 2 volumes (1862). An account of a personal trip to Palestine.
- Pélerinage en Terre Sainte de l'igoumène russe Daniel, au commencement du XIIe siècle, (1113-1115) (1864). An edition of Puteshestive igumena Daniil by Daniel the Pilgrim (fl. c. 1107), also known as Daniel the Higumenos.

Henry Yule. Sir Henry Yule (1820–1889), a Scottish orientalist and geographer.

- Cathay and the Way Thither, 2 volumes (1866). Translated and edited with a preliminary essay on the intercourse between China and the West prior to the discovery of the Cape Route. Containing the travels of Odoric of Pordenone, ibn Battūta, Francesco Balducci Pegolotti, Giovanni de' Marignolli, and Rashid-al-Din Hamadani, together with letters and reports from missionary friars from Cathay and India from 1292 to 1338. Printed for the Hakluyt Society, Volumes 36, 37.
- The Book of Ser Marco Polo, the Venetian, concerning the kingdoms and marvels of the East, 2 volumes (1903). An edition of the work by Italian writer Rustichello da Pisa (fl. late 13th century). With French historian Henri Cordier (1849–1925).

Titus Tobler. Titus Tobler (1806–1877), a Swiss oriental scholar.

- Libellus de locis sanctis editus circa A.D. 1172 (1865). An edition of the Libellus de locis sanctis (Little Book of the Holy Places), a 12th-century Latin guide book of Palestine for the use of Christian pilgrims to the Holy Land.
- Bibliographia Geographica Palestinæ (1867). A bibliography of sources for the geography of the Holy Land, prepared by Tobler after an 1865 visit there. See writeup in Chapter 10 for list of authors.
- Palaestinae descriptiones ex saeculo IV, V et VI (1870). Descriptions of the Holy Land from pilgrims of the 4th, 5th and 6th centuries. Includes the Itinerarium Burdigalense, Pilgrimage of Holy Paula by Saint Jerome, The Epitome of S. Eucherius, and Theodosius' De situ terrae sanctae, with commentary.
- Descriptiones Terrae Sanctae ex saeculo VIII., IX., XII. et XV (1874). Descriptions of the Holy Land from the 8th through 15th centuries, compiled and edited by T. Tobler. Accounts include: Saint Willibald (723–726); Commemoratorium de Casis Dei vel Monasteriis, a survey of the Holy Land in 808 commissioned by Charlemagne; Bernard the Pilgrim's travels (c. 865); an anonymous account known as Innominatus VII (1145); John of Würzburg's account (1165); Innominatus VIII (1185); La Citez de Jherusalem (c. 1187), a late 12th-century French description of the holy city used in the Rothelin Continuation; and, Description of the Holy Land (1422) by John Poloner. With commentary by the editor.
- Itinera hierosolymitana et descriptiones terrae sanctae bellis sacris anteriora (1879). Itineraries of pilgrimages to the Holy Land from the fourth through the eleventh century. Includes Bernard the Pilgrim (fl. 865), Saint Willibald (c. 700 – c. 787), the Venerable Bede (c. 720), Arculf (fl. late seventh century), Theodosius' De situ terrae sanctae (530), Eucherius of Lyon (440), and Saint Paula of Rome (347-404) and her daughter Eustochium. Editor, with French historian Auguste Molinier (1851–1904) and Swiss archivist Charles A. Kohler (1854–1917).

Paul E. D. Riant. Paul Edouard Didier Riant (1836–1888), a French historian specializing on the Crusades.

- Expéditions et pèlerinages des Scandinaves en Terre sainte au temps des croisades, 2 volumes (1865–1869). Scandinavian expeditions and pilgrimages to the Holy Land during the Crusades.
- Exuviae Sacrae Constantinoploitanae (1877–1888). A collection of documents edited by Paul Riant relating to the status of relics at Constantinople before 1204 and their disposition after the Fourth Crusade. A further study, La croix des premiers croisés; la sainte lance; la sainte couronne, was published by French archaeologist and art historian Fernand de Mély in 1904.

Edward H. Palmer. Edward H. Palmer (1840–1882), an English orientalist and explorer. Member of the Palestine Exploration Fund.

- The Desert of the Exodus, 2 volumes (1871). An account of journeys to the Sinai and Palestine.
- Poems of Beha-ed-Din (1876–1877). Poetry of Egyptian poet Behá-ed-Dín Zoheir (died 1258), in Arabic and English. Behá-ed-Dín Zoheir is mentioned in the biographical dictionary Wafayat al-ayan wa-anba al-zaman of Ibn Khallikan (1211–1282) and in Arabian Nights, but is otherwise unknown.
- Arabic Grammar (1874). An Arabic manual, comprising a condensed grammar of classical and modern Arabic, reading lessons and exercises, with analyses, and a vocabulary of useful words
- Jerusalem, the city of Herod and Saladin (1871), with English novelist and historian Walter Besant (1836–1901). A history of Jerusalem from 33 BCE through the time Saladin, including the first kings of Jerusalem (1099–1191)
- A Concise Dictionary of the Persian Language (1884).
- A translation of the Qur'an (1880). Volume 9 of the Sacred Books of the East series.

Claude Reignier Conder. Claude Reignier Conder (1848–1910), an English soldier, explorer and antiquarian. Member of the Palestine Exploration Fund.

- Mediæval Topography of Palestine (1875). In Palestine Exploration Quarterly (1875–1876).
- The Survey of Western Palestine (1881). With British officer Herbert Kitchener (1850–1916). Arabic and English name lists collected during the survey.
- The Survey of Eastern Palestine (1889). Memoirs of the topography, orography, hydrography and archaeology.
- The Latin Kingdom of Jerusalem (1897). A history of the kingdom from Peter the Hermit through the fall of Acre in 1291. With a list of authorities.
- The City of Jerusalem (1897). A translation of La Citez de Jherusalem (c. 1187), a late 12th-century French description of the holy city used in the Rothelin Continuation. In PPTS VI.2.
- The Life of Saladin (1897). Translation of biography of Saladin by Baha ad-Din ibn Shaddad (1145–1234), published as part of the library of the Palestine Pilgrims' Text Society.

Surveys of the Holy Land. Surveys of the Holy Land were sponsored by the Palestine Exploration Fund, include works by the British explorers Claude R. Conder (1848–1910), Horatio Herbert Kitchener (1850–1916) and Edward Hull (1829–1917).

- The Survey of Western Palestine: Memoirs of the topography, orography, hydrography, and archæology (1881–1883). By Claude R. Conder and Herbert Kitchener.
- The Survey of Western Palestine: Arabic and English name lists collected during the survey (1881). By Claude R. Conder and Herbert Kitchener.
- Mount Seir, Sinai and Western Palestine (1885). By British archaeologist Edward Hull.
- Memoir on the geology and geography of Arabia Petræa, Palestine, and adjoining districts (1886). By Edward Hull. With special reference to the mode of formation of the Jordan-Arabah depression and the Dead Sea.
- The Survey of Eastern Palestine (1889). By Claude R. Conder. Memoirs of the topography, orography, hydrography and archaeology.

Charles Henri Auguste Schefer. Charles Henri Auguste Schefer (1820–1898), a French historian. (cf. French Wikipedia, Charles-Henri-Auguste Schefer)

- Recueil de voyages et de documents pour servir à l’histoire de la géographie depuis le XIII^{e} siècle jusqu'à la fin du XVI^{e} siècle, 24 volumes (1882–1916). With French orientalist Henri Cordier (1849–1925). A library created by Schefer in order to compete with the Hakluyt Society in England.
- Section cartographique (1893–1896). Volume 1 of Recueil de voyages et de documents...
- Recueil de voyages et de documents..., Volumes 5, 17. Includes: (a) Le voyage d'Outremer (Égypte, Mont Sinay, Palestine) by Jean Thenaud (Volume 5). (b) Itinéraire d'Antibes à Constantinonple by Jérôme Maurand (Volume 17).
- Recueil de voyages et de documents..., Volume 8. Includes: Le Voyage de Monsieur d'Aramon dans le Levant by Jean Chesneau.
- Recueil de voyages et de documents..., Volumes 9–15, 22, 23. Includes: (a) Itinerario de Ludouico de Varthema Bolognese (Volume 9). (b) Les voyages en Asie au XIVe siècle... by Odoric of Pordenone (Volume 10). (c) Le voyage de la Terre sainte by Denis Possot (Volume 11). (d) Le Voyage d’Outremer de Bertrandon de la Broquière (Volume 12). (e) Description de l'Afrique (Volumes 13–15). (f) Livre de la Description des Pays(Volume 22). (g) Americo Vespuce, by Henry Vignaud (Volume 23).
- Le discours du voyage d'oultremer au très victorieux roi Charles VII, prononcé, en 1452, par Jean Germain, évêque de Chalon (1895). The speech of the overseas voyage to the very victorious Charles VII of France, delivered in 1452 by Jean Germain, bishop of Chalon. In Revue de l'Orient Latin (ROL), Tome 3.
- Les voyages en Asie au XIVe siècle du bienheureux frère Odoric de Pordenone (1891). Edited by French historian Henri Cordier (1849–1925). With introduction, guide to different manuscripts and notes. In Recueil de voyages et de documents..., Volume 10.

Henri Cordier. Henri Cordier (1849–1925), a French linguist, historian, ethnographer and orientalist.

- Recueil de voyages et de documents pour servir à l’histoire de la géographie depuis le XIII^{e} siècle jusqu'à la fin du XVI^{e} siècle, 24 volumes (1882–1923). With French historian Charles Schefer (1820-1898).
- Les voyages en Asie au XIVe siècle du bienheureux frère Odoric de Pordenone (1891). A translation of a work by Odoric of Pordenone (1286–1331). In Recueil de voyages et de documents..., Volume 10.

Charles Montagu Doughty. Charles Montagu Doughty (1843–1926), an English poet and explorer.

- Travels in Arabia Deserta, 2 volumes (1888). An account of Doughty's travels to the Middle East in the 1870s. Edition of 1921 includes an introduction by T. E. Lawrence. Reviewed by explorer Richard F. Burton in 1898.

Edward H. Palmer. Edward Henry Palmer (1840–1882), an English orientalist and traveler.

- Jerusalem, the city of Herod and Saladin (1888).

James R. Macpherson. Rev. James Rose Macpherson, an English translator.

- The pilgrimage of Arculfus in the Holy Land: about the year A.D. 670 (1889). Translated by J. R. Macpherson. In the library of the Palestine Pilgrims' Text Society. Includes the abbreviation of the account by Bede.

Stanley Lane-Poole. Stanley Edward Lane-Poole (1854–1931), a British orientalist and archaeologist.

- The Barbary Corsairs (1890). Includes an account of the Spanish Crusade to Mahdia of 1550.
- The Mohammedan Dynasties: Chronological and Genealogical Tables with Historical Introductions (1894). Includes the dynasties of Egypt, the Levant, Persia, Afghanistan and the Mongols.
- Saladin and the Fall of the Kingdom of Jerusalem (1898).
- History of Egypt in the Middle Ages (1901).
- Personal Narrative of a Pilgrimage to Al Madinah and Meccah, 3 volumes (1913). Introduction to the work by British explorer Richard Francis Burton (1821–1890), edited by Lady Isabel Burton (1831–1896).

Reinhold Röhricht. Reinhold Röhricht (1842–1905), a German historian of the Crusades, regarded as a pioneer with fellow German historian Heinrich Hagenmeyer (1834–1915) in the history of the kingdom of Jerusalem, laying the foundation for modern Crusader research.

- Bibliotheca geographica Palaestinae (1890). Summaries of over 3500 books on the geography of the Holy Land, many of them written by pilgrims, issued between A.D. 355 and 1878.

Aubrey Stewart. Aubrey Stewart (1844–1916), an English historian and translator.

- Archæological Researches in Palestine during the Years 1873–1874, 2 volumes (1896, 1899). Translation of a work by Charles Simon Clermont-Ganneau.
- Library of the Palestine Pilgrims' Text Society (PPTS) (1897). Translation of numerous works, including Volume I (b), (e), Volume II, Volume V, Volume VI (a), (d), Volumes VII–X, Volume XI, Volume XII (see below).

J. W. McCrindle. John Watson McCrindle (1825–1913), a Scottish philologist who translated the work Christian Topography by Greek merchant Cosmas Indicopleustes (fl. 6th century) who made several voyages to India during the reign of Justinian. His work contains some of the earliest and most famous world maps.

- Kosma aigyptiou monachou Christianikē topographia: The Christian topography of Cosmas, an Egyptian monk (1897). Translated from the Greek, and edited with notes and introduction. Issued by the Hakluyt Society, First series, Volume 98.

Kurt Villads Jensen. Kurt Villads Jensen, a professor of Medieval History at the University of Stockholm.

- Crusading at the Edges of Europe: Denmark and Portugal, c. 1000 – c. 1250 (2017). A work concerning Denmark and Portugal in the Middle Ages, how the two countries became strong kingdoms and important powers internationally by their participation in the Crusades.

== Holy Relics ==
The study of the relics of Christianity is closely tied to pilgrimages as well as to the Crusades where relics were obtained either from the Holy Land or by theft from Constantinople. By the 3rd century, pilgrimages to the Holy Land had begun and the search for relics started in the 4th century by Saint Helena. Additional information on the translation of relics of the saints can be found in Bibliotheca Hagiographica Latina. Islam also recognizes relics dating from the time Abraham through that of the Prophet, known as the Sacred Trust, some of which are also relevant to Christianity.

The Recueil des historiens des croisades, Historiens occidentaux, Volume 5.VII, contains Documenta Lipsanographica ad I. bellum sacrum spectantia (Relics of the Holy Land), which is a collection of eleven accounts of relics of the Holy Land written from 1098 to 1125. Included are discussions of the translation of relics of Christ and the Virgin Mary, John the Baptist, Saints George, Nicholas, Basil and Stephen, the patriarchs at Hebron, among others.

- True Cross. The True Cross is first mentioned in the pilgrimage of Saint Helena from 326 to 328, with her finding relics of the Cross, including nails and the Titulus Crucis. This is described in Socrates Scholasticus' Historia Ecclesiastica, and later in Egeria's Itinerarium Egeriae. Held in Jerusalem, it was lost to the Sassanids in 614, and returned by Heraclius in 630. With the loss of Jerusalem to the Fatimids in 1109, the relic was hidden by local Christians. The Cross' recovery by the Crusaders in 1099 is described in the works of Raymond of Aguilers, Fulcher of Chartres and William of Tyre. It was again in 1187, this time to Saladin who also viewed it as important to Islam. In 1219, it was offered to the Knights Templar in exchange for the lifting of the siege of Damietta, but never delivered. Most relics known today came from Constantinople after 1204, including two large pieces purloined by Robert de Clari.
- Seamless Robe of Jesus. The seamless robe of Jesus, also known as the Holy Coat, was also alleged to have been claimed by Saint Helena. The biography of St. Agritius, bishop of Trier, written before 1072, describes the relic being sent by Helena to Trier.
- Search for Relics in the 4th Century. Authorities such as poet Prudentius (348 – after 405), author of Liber Peristephanon (Crowns of Martyrdom) and Carmina, and Magnus Felix Ennodius, bishop of Pavia (473/474-521) author of Libellum pro Synodo, taught that they Christian saints and martyrs could perform miracles and encouraged the search for holy relics. This view was continued by Saint Ambrose (c. 340–397), archbishop of Milan, whose Epistolae (Letter XXII) was an inspiration to acquire relics from the Holy Land; by Saint Basil (330-378) in a letter to Saint Ambrose; and by Victricius, bishop of Rouen (c. 330 – c. 407), in his Liber de Laude Sanctorum (On the Praise of the Saints).
- Saint Eudocia. Saint Eudocia (c. 401 – 460), a Byzantine empress married to Theodosius II who went on a pilgrimage to Jerusalem in 438–439, returning with numerous holy relics.
- Holy Lance. The Holy Lance is a legendary relic with competing claims of legitimacy. It was reported by Antoninus Martyr in his pilgrimage to Jerusalem in 570, as well as other sources. Peter Bartholomew made claims to the discovery of the lance during the siege of Antioch in 1098, as reported in Gesta Francorum and by Raymond of Aguilers. Those claims were disputed by Adhemar of Le Puy. An account of the recovery of point of the Holy Lance by Byzantine emperor Heraclius is found in the Chronicon Paschale (7th century).
- Holy Chalice. Relics associated with the Holy Chalice (Holy Grail) are first seen by Arculf in his Pilgrimage, mentioning a chalice used in the Last Supper in a chapel near Jerusalem. Two actual relics are known. Sacro Cationno is a hexagonal dish returned to Italy by Genoese Crusaders in 1101, as described by William of Tyre and in the 13th century work the Golden Legend. The Chalice of Valencia was first identified in 1134 and is of unknown origin, although a theory is that it accompanied Saint Peter in his journey to Rome.
- Relics of John the Baptist. The relics of John the Baptist are discussed in Legenda translationis beatissimi Johannis Baptistæ Genuam (1098), edited by Jacobus de Voragine, and Nicolai de Porta, Historia translations reliquiarum beatissimi Johannes Baptistæ Genuam (compiled 1405). In RHC Historiens occidentaux, Volume 5.VII.i and VII.ii.
- Relic of Saint George. Saint George (died 303) was the patron saint of the First Crusade, and his relic was given to Robert II of Flanders who returned to Europe in 1098. The account of the sacred relic of Saint George is provided in the anonymous Narratio quo modo relliquiæ martyris Georgii ad nos Aquicinenses pervenerunt(1100). In RHC Historiens occidentaux, Volume 5.VII.iii.
- Relics of Saint Sabbas. The relics of Saint Sabbas the Sanctified (439–532) were taken by Crusaders in the 13th century as a result of the War of Saint Sabas (1256–1270), and taken to the Church of Saint Anthony in Venice. His biography is provided in the Life of St. Saba by Cyril of Scythopolis (439–532). In the Palestine Pilgrims' Text Society (PPTS) library, Volume XI.1.
- Translatio sancti Nicolai. Translatio Sancti Nicolai in Venetiam is an anonymous eyewitness 12th century account of Venetian contributions to the Crusades, including a description of the siege of Haifa of 1100. It was later rewritten to provide context to the translation of the relics of Saint Nicholas to Bari. It has been speculated that the author of Translatio was Gallus Anonymous. In RHC Historiens occidentaux, Volume 5.VII.iv).
- Relics of Watten Abbey. In 1097, Robert II of Flanders returned home with relics given to him by Roger Borsa. As recorded by a charter of his wife Clementia of Burgundy, these included the hair of the Virgin Mary and the bones of Saints Matthew and Saint Nicholas, and were taken to Watten Abbey. A full account is given in the anonymous Qualiter reliquiæ B. Nicolai, episcopi et confessoris, ad Lotharingiæ villam, quæ Portus nominatur, delatæ sunt (1101). In RHC Historiens occidentaux, Volume 5.VII and Heinrich Hagenmeyer's Die Kreuzzugsbriefe aus den Jahren, 1088-1100, VII.
- Relics of Saints Basil, Stephen and Others. The translations of the relics of Saint Basil and Saint Stephen are described in Qualiter tabula s. Basilii Cluniacum delata fuitit (1112) and Tractus de Reliquiis s. Stephani, Cluniacum Delatis (1120). The translation of the remains of Saints Nicodème, Gamaliel, Abibon to Pisa are described in Gesta Triumphalia Pisanorum in Captione Jerusalem. In RHC Historiens occidentaux, Volume 5.VII.vi, VII.ix, VIII.vii.
- Shroud of Cadouin. The translation of the Holy Shroud of Cadouin (le Saint-Suaire de Cadouin) to Cadouin Abbey is described in Pancarta Caduniensis (Charter of Cadouin), Seu historia santa sudarii Jesu Christi habita ab Adhemaro episcopo, Antiochiæ, anno incarnationis Domini MIIC, in ecclesiale Caduniensem translati(1117). The shroud is believed to be the facecloth from the tomb of Christ. The account claims the relic was linked to Adhemar of Le Puy, brought from Antioch by a priest of Périgord, but it is not documented at the abbey until 1215. In RHC Historiens occidentaux, Volume 5.VII.vii.
- Tractatus Inventione Sanctorum Patriarcharum. The work (Canonici Hebronensis)Tractatus Inventione Sanctorum Patriarcharum Abraham, Ysaac et Jacob, by an anonymous author was dictated by two monks of Hebron c. 1119. It describes a sanctuary at Hebron existing on the site of the tombs of Abraham, Isaac and Jacob before the First Crusade, and the failed attempt of Theodosius II to return the bodies of the patriarchs to Constantinople. The sepulchral crypt was despoiled by Peter of Narbonne. In RHC Historiens occidentaux, Volume 5.VII.viii.
- Cerbano Cerbani. Cerbano Cerbani (fl. 1125) was an Italian scholar who wrote Translatio mirifici martyris Isidori a Chio insula in civitatem Venetam (1125), describing the translation of the body of the martyr Isidore of Chios to the Basilica of Saint Mark's in Venice. The work is also a partial autobiography, providing the only information known about Cerbani. In RHC Historiens occidentaux, Volume 5.VII.x.
- Reliquiis Sanctæ Crucis. A work by an anonymous monk from Schaffhausen called De Reliquiis Sanctæ Crucis et Dominici Sepulcri Scaphusam Allatis (1125) describes the translation of relics of three martyrs from the Holy Land. In RHC Historiens occidentaux, Volume 5.VII.xi.
- The Conquest of Constantinople. Robert de Clari's La Conquête de Constantinople provides an account of the relics of Constantinople and the looting of those treasures. He was one of the last to see the Shroud of Turin prior to 1258 when Geoffroi de Charny and his wife reported ownership. Robert reportedly donated a Byzantine crystal cross reliquary to Corbie Abbey. The plunder of Nivelon of Chérisy, bishop of Soissons, apparently included the heads of seven saints and the crown of St. Mark's head. Conrad of Krosigk also returned with many relics, as reported in the Deeds of the Bishops of Halberstadt.
- Exuviae Sacrae Constantinoploitanae. Exuviae Sacrae Constantinoploitanae (1877–1888) is a collection of documents edited by Paul Riant relating to the status of relics at Constantinople before 1204 and their disposition after the Fourth Crusade. A further study La croix des premiers croisés; la sainte lance; la sainte couronne was published by Fernand de Mély in 1904.
- Crown of Thorns. In 1241, Baldwin II, the last Latin emperor ruling from Constantinople, sold the Crown of Thorns and assorted other relics associated with Christ's Passion to Louis IX of France, as recounted in Joinville's biography Life of Saint Louis. Louis built the Sainte-Chapelle to house it.

== Collections ==
Palestine Pilgrims' Text Society (PPTS). The Palestine Pilgrims' Text Society (PPTS), based in London, specialised in publishing editions and translations of medieval texts of pilgrimage's to the Holy Land. They began publishing in 1884, transferring to the Palestine Exploration Fund in 1189. The library of the Palestine Pilgrims' Text Society includes 13 volumes plus index and was published 1884–1896.

- PPTS, Volume I, 5 parts published individually from 1887 to 1891 (1897). Includes: (a) The Churches of Constantine at Jerusalem (translations of Eusebius' Life of Constantine and other early pilgrims). (b) The Bordeaux Pilgrim, A.D. 333. (c) The Pilgrimage of St. Silvia of Aquiania, A.D. 385 (now known as the Itinerarium Egeriae). (d) The Letter of Paula and Eustochium to Marcella, A.D. 361 (by Saint Paula of Rome and her daughter Eustochium, written to Saint Marcella). (e) The Pilgrimage of the Holy Paula, by St. Jerome, A.D. 382 (written by Jerome of Stridon).
- PPTS, Volume II, 4 parts published individually from 1887 to 1891 (1897). Includes: (a) The Epitome of St. Eucherius about Certain Holy Places, A.D. 440 (attributed to Eucherius, Bishop of Lyon), and the Breviary, or Short Description of Jerusalem, A.D. 530 (anonymous text). (b) Theodosius on the Topography of the Holy Land, A.D. 530 (now referred to as De situ terrae sanctae). (c) The Buildings of Justinian by Procopius, A.D. 560 (written by Procopius of Caesarea ). (d) The Holy Places Visited by Anoninus Martyr, A.D. 560–570 (attributed to an anonymous pilgrim of Piacenza).
- PPTS, Volume III, 4 parts published individually from 1886 to 1896 (1896). Includes: (a) The Pilgrimage of Arculfus, c. A.D. 670 (by Arculf, with annotation) in two parts. First, Arculf's Narrative about the Holy Places (De locis sanctis), written by Adomnán. Second, The Venerable Bede on the Holy Places (by Bede). (b) The Hodœporicon of St. Willibald, c. A.D. 754 (written by Willibald) and The Itinerary of St. Willibald (by an anonymous writer of the 8th century). (c) Description of Syria, including Palestine, A.D. 485, by al-Maqdisi. (d) The Itinerary of Bernard the Wise, A.D. 870 (written by Bernard the Pilgrim), and How the City of Jerusalem is Situated, c. A.D. 1090 (an anonymous account).
- PPTS, Volume IV, 3 parts published individually from 1892 to 1896 (1897). Includes: (a) Diary of a Journey through Syria and Palestine, A.D. 1017, by Nasir-i-Khusraw (now known as the Safarnāma) and The Gates of the Haram Area, by C. W. Wilson. (b) Pilgrimage of Sæwulf to Jerusalem and the Holy Land, A.D. 1102–1103, by English pilgrim Sæwulf. (c) The Pilgrimage of the Russian Abbot Daniel, A.D. 1106–1107, by Daniel the Higumenos. An introduction, annotation and six appendices by C. W. Wilson.
- PPTS, Volume V, 5 parts published individually from 1891 to 1896 (1897). Includes: (a) Description of Jerusalem and the Holy Land, A.D. 1130, by Rorgo Fretellus. (b) Description of the Holy Land, A.D. 1160–1170, by John of Würzburg, with a preface abridged from Titus Tobler and notes by C. W. Wilson. (c) The Pilgrimage of Johannes Phocas in the Holy Land, A.D. 1185, by John Phocas. With a preface by Leo Allatius. (d) Theoderich's Description of the Holy Place (now known as Libellus de Locis Sanctis), attributed to the unknown monk Theoderich. With preface derived from Titus Tobler and an appendix on the position of the tombs of the Latin kings. (e) Crusader's Letters, A.D. 1281. Correspondence between Joseph of Chauncy, Prior of the English Hospitaller, and Edward I of England. Edited by William Basevi Sanders.
- PPTS, Volume VI, 4 parts published individually in 1894 and 1897 (1897). Includes: (a) Anonymous Pilgrims, I–VIII, 11th and 12th centuries. (accounts of Innominatus I–VIII edited by Titus Tobler). (b) The City of Jerusalem (La Citez de Jherusalem), after A.D. 1187, translated by C. R. Conder. (Used as source for the Rothelin Continuation). (c) Guide-Book to Palestine, c. A.D. 1350), by Philipus Brusserius Savonenis, likely supplemented by Marino Sanudo the Elder, Odoric of Pordenone, and Niccolò da Poggibonsi. (d) John Poloner's Description of the Holy Land, c. A.D. 1421, based on an edition of Titus Tobler.
- PPTS, Volumes VII–X (1893, 1896). Includes The Wanderings of Brother Felix Fabri, A.D. 1484, in 4 volumes by Felix Fabri.
- PPTS, Volume XI, 2 parts published individually in 1895 and 1896 (1897). Includes: (a) Extracts from Aristeas, Hecatæus, Origen and other Early Writers. The excerpts are from: Historia de Legis Divinæ Translatione by "Aristeas" (2nd century BC); Aegiptica by Greek Physician Hecatæus of Abdera, (4th century BC); Origen of Alexander's Treatise against Celsum (Contra Celsum, c. 184 – c. 253); the Catechetical Lectures of Cyril of Jerusalem (c. 313 – 386); Life of St. Saba by Cyril of Scythopolis (439–532); Roman History, Book LXIX by Cassius Dio (c. 155 – c. 235); The Second Year of the Reign of Heraclius, from Chronicon Paschale (7th century), concerning the Holy Lance; the Anacreontics of Sophronius of Jerusalem (c. 560 – 638); the Chronicle of Theophanes the Confessor (758/760 – 817/818); and Book II of Eutychii annales by Eutychius of Alexandria(c. 938). Translated by Aubrey Stewart, with a preface by C. W. Wilson. (b) The History of Jerusalem, A.D. 1180, by Jacques de Vitry. With preface by Aubrey Stewart.
- PPTS, Volume XII, 3 parts (1897). Includes: (a) A Description of the Holy Land, A.D. 1280, by Burchard of Mount Sion. With Burchard's Itinerary. (b) Part XIV of Book III of Secrets for True Crusaders to Help Them to Recover the Holy Land (Liber Secretorum Fidelium Crucis), A.D. 1321, by Marino Sanuto the Elder. With preface by Aubrey Stewart and geographical notes by C. R. Conder. (c) Description of the Holy Land, and of the Way Thither, A.D. 1350, by Ludolf von Sudheim. With preface by Aubrey Stewart.
- PPTS, Volume XIII (1897). Includes: Saladin, or What Befell Sultan Yûsuf (Salâh ed-Dîn), A.D. 1145–1232, by Beha ed-Din. With an introduction, notes and genealogy chart by C. W. Wilson, and annotation by C. R. Conder.
- General Index to the Library of the Palestine Pilgrims' Text Society (1897). Master index to the 13 volumes. (Each volume also has its own index.)

English Travelers through the Eighteenth Century. An overview to English travelers through the 18th century has been provided by Mohamad Ali Hachicho in his English Travel Books About the Arab Near East in the Eighteenth Century (1964), published in Die Welt des Islams.

Travelogues of the 18th to 20th Centuries. Travel accounts to Persia by Nader Nasiri-Moghaddam.

Hakluyt Society. The Hakluyt Society, a text publication society, founded in London in 1846. Publishes scholarly editions of primary records of historic voyages, travels and other geographical material. Named after English adventurer and author Richard Hakluyt.

Zeitschrift des Deutschen Palästina-Vereins. Zeitschrift des Deutschen Palästina-Vereins (Journal of the German Society for Exploration of Palestine) (1878–present), is a biannual journal covering research on the cultural history of the Levant.

Independent Crusaders Project. A database of Crusaders who travelled to the Holy Land independent of a major expedition, with source listings. Prepared and maintained by the Fordham University Center for Medieval Studies.

== See also ==
- Biblical archaeology
- Cartography of Jerusalem
- Cartography of Palestine
- Christian Pilgrimage
- Crusades
- Crusading Movement
- Hakluyt Society
- List of Christian holy places in the Holy Land
- Palestine Exploration Fund
- Travelogues of Palestine
