= Palestine Pilgrims' Text Society =

British text publication society

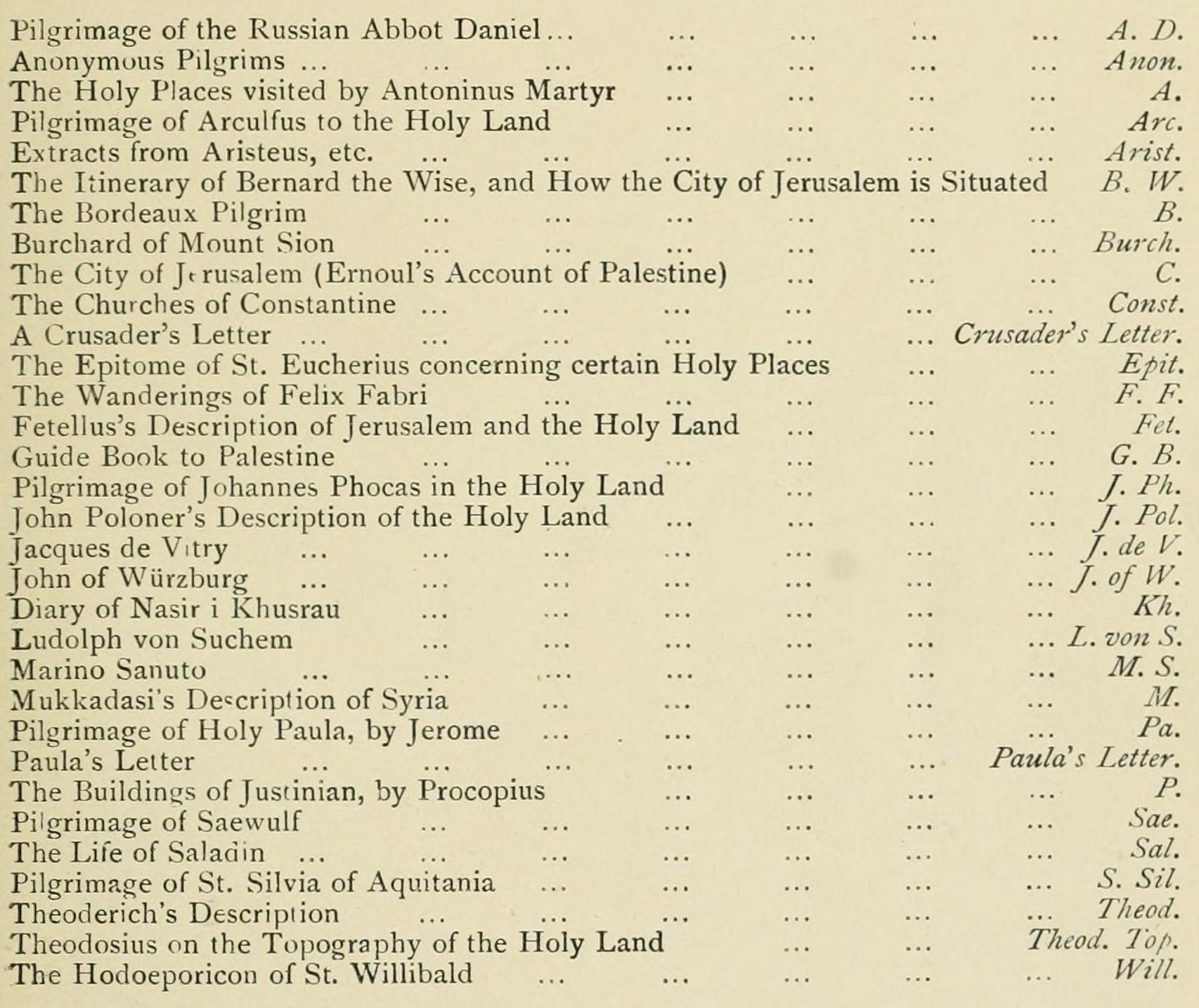
List of Abbreviations from the 1897 General Index to the library of the Palestine Pilgrims' Text Society

The Palestine Pilgrims' Text Society (PPTS) was a text publication society based in London, which specialised in publishing editions and translations of medieval texts relevant to the history of pilgrimage to the Holy Land. Particular attention was given to accounts by pilgrims and other travellers containing geographical or topographical information, as well as those which discussed the manners and customs of the Holy Land. The original narratives were written in a variety of languages, including Greek, Latin, Arabic, Hebrew, Old French, Russian, and German.

The Society first started publishing its work in 1884, and continued for eleven years, publishing a total of twelve volumes. In 1896, these works were transferred to the Palestine Exploration Fund, for distribution to the members of the PPTS.

The editions remain valuable and are frequently cited in scholarly works. A version is also available as The Library of the Palestine Pilgrims' Text Society.

Certain well-known pilgrimages included are those of: Jacques de Vitry, Saint Jerome's Pilgrimage of the Holy Paula, Mukaddasi's description of Syria, and the Itinerarium Burdigalense.

== Publications ==
- (1886): Description of Syria, including Palestine by Mukaddasi (c. 985)
- (1887): Of the Holy Places visited by Antoninus Martyr by Antoninus of Piacenza, archive.org
- (1887): Itinerary from Bordeaux to Jerusalem by "The Bordeaux Pilgrim", (333), archive.org
- (1887): Jerome (1887). The Pilgrimage of the Holy Paula. Palestine Pilgrims' Text Society.
- (1888): Of the Buildings of Justinian by Procopius (c. 560)
- (1889): The Letters of Paula and Eustochium to Marcella, about the Holy Places (A.D. 386)
- (1889): Phokas, J. (1889). The Pilgrimage of Johannes Phocas in the Holy Land. Palestine Pilgrims' Text Society.
- (1890): Description of the Holy Land by John of Würzburg (1160–1170)
- (1890): The Epitome of S. Eucherius about certain Holy Places (ca. A.D. 440) and the Breviary or short description of Jerusalem (ca. A.D. 530)
    - Antoninus of Piacenza (1890). Of the Holy Places Visited by Antoninus Martyr About the year A.D. 570. London: Palestine Pilgrims' Text Society.
  - alt.: (1890): The Epitome of S. Eucherius about certain Holy Places (ca. A.D. 440) and the Breviary or short description of Jerusalem (ca. A.D. 530)
- (1891): Churches of Constantine at Jerusalem: being translations from Eusenius and the early pilgrims
  - alt.: (1896): Churches of Constantine at Jerusalem: being translations from Eusenius and the early pilgrims
- (1891): The Hodæporicon of Saint Willibald (c. 754) by Huneburc
- (1891): The Pilgrimage of S. Silvia of Aquitania to the Holy Places (ca. A.D. 385)
- (1891): Description of the Holy Places. (ca. A.D. 1172) by Theoderich
- (1892): Saewolf (A.D. 1102, 1103) archive.org
- (1893): Fabri, Felix (1893). Felix Fabri (ca. A.D. 1480–1483) vol II, part I. Palestine Pilgrims' Text Society.
- (1893): Fabri, Felix (1893). Felix Fabri (ca. A.D. 1480–1483) vol II, part II. Palestine Pilgrims' Text Society. with p. 677: Index
- (1893): Theodosius (530)
- (1893): The Itinerary of Bernhard the Wise (A.D. 870) How the City of Jerusalem is Situated, (ca. A.D. 1090?) archive.org
- (1894): Anonymous Pilgrims, I–VIII (11th and 12th centuries
- (1894): Poloner, John (1894). John Poloner's description of the Holy Land (ca. A.D. 1421). Palestine Pilgrims' Text Society.
- (1894): Guide-book to Palestine (ca. A.D. 1350) archive.org
- (1895): Adomnán (1895). Pilgrimage of Arculfus in the Holy Land (about the year A.D. 670). Palestine Pilgrims' Text Society. (about Arculf)
- (1895): Extracts from Aristeas, Hecatæus, Origen, and other early writers
  - alt.: (1895): Extracts from Aristeas, Hecatæus, Origen, and other early writers
- (1896): Fetellus (ca. A.D. 1130), Translated and Annotated by Rev. James Rose Macpherson
- (1896): Fabri, Felix (1896). Felix Fabri (ca. A.D. 1480–1483) vol I, part I. Palestine Pilgrims' Text Society.
- (1896): Fabri, Felix (1896). Felix Fabri (ca. A.D. 1480–1483) vol I, part II. Palestine Pilgrims' Text Society.
- (1896): The Life of Saladin by Beha Ed-Din (AD 1137–1193)
- (1896): History of Jerusalem by Jacques de Vitry, 1180
- (1896): A Description of the Holy Land by Burchard of Mount Sion.
- (1897): Vol III, The Pilgrimage of Arculfus (1889) The Hodoeporicon of St. Willibald. Description of Syria and Palestine, by Mukaddasi. The Itinerary of Bernhard the Wise.
- (1897): Vol IV A Journey through Syria and Palestine. (1888) By Nasir-I-Khusrau. The Pilgrimage of Saewulf to Jerusalem. The Pilgrimage of the Russian abbot Daniel.
- (1897): Vol VI, Anonymous Pilgrims. (1894) The City of Jerusalem and Ernoul's account of Palestine. The Guide Book to Palestine. Description of the Holy Land, by John Poloner.
- (1897): General Index to the Library of Palestine Pilgrims' Text Society

== See also ==
- Travelogues of Palestine
