= Rothelin Continuation =

The Rothelin Continuation is an anonymous Old French prose history of the Crusades and the Crusader states between 1229 and 1261. It is one of the most important sources for the period it covers, which includes the Barons' Crusade (1239–1241), the Seventh Crusade (1248–1254) and the first Mongol raid into Palestine (1260).

== Title, transmission, authorship and date ==
The title of the work, which is a modern invention, comes from the 18th-century owner of an important manuscript, the Abbé Charles d'Orléans de Rothelin. Although it is a distinct and self-contained work, it only survives appended to the Estoire d'Eracles, the Old French translation of William of Tyre's Historia, where it functions as a continuation of the Chronique d'Ernoul, itself an independent work serving to continue the Eracles down to 1231.

The Rothelin Continuation survives in twelve to fifteen manuscripts. These fall in two groups: a group of five containing two songs of protest by disappointed crusaders absent in the rest and a group of seven containing ancient Roman lore similar to the Fet des Romains and which is absent in the group of five. All of them were copied in northern France or Flanders in the late 13th or early 14th century, perhaps in connection to the interest in crusading fostered at the court of Philip IV of France.

The text itself was probably written in the Île-de-France or near Soissons, since the author seems especially well-informed about that region. The author probably had first-hand knowledge of the Crusader states in the East. Nothing more can be said of the author's biography. The text was probably written shortly after 1261, perhaps about 1265. The text does not hint at the death of Louis IX of France in 1270 on the Eighth Crusade or his canonization in 1297.

== Structure and content ==
The Rothelin Continuation is divided into 82 chapters. Its narrative of the period 1229–1261 is interrupted by several major digressions. An opening description of Christian–Muslim relations in 1229 is followed by six chapters describing the city of Jerusalem. This section is derived from La Citez de Jherusalem, a late 12th-century French description of the holy city. This is followed by some recommended pilgrimages to the Holy Land and three chapters (12–14) on the so-called prophecy of the son of Agap, derived from a text written around the time of the Fifth Crusade (1217–1221). This "bewildering" section contains astrology, wolves and a pregnant camel. The next two chapters (15–16) concern the family of Saladin, followed by a chapter each on the Assassins, the office of the Abbasid Caliph and the "wickedness" of Frederick II, Holy Roman Emperor. All of this is preliminary to the main historical narrative, which begins in chapter 20.

The main narrative picks up with the Barons' Crusade under King Theobald I of Navarre gathering at Marseille in 1239. This section, which is vivid and detailed, is interrupted at one point for an excursus on the names of Babylon. One chapter (27) is devoted to the Ayyubid Egyptian intelligence system. Two chapters (30–31) are poems written by discouraged crusaders, one written by a nobleman in captivity. The expedition of Earl Richard of Cornwall is covered in less detail than that of the king of Navarre (chapter 36). Two chapters (40–41) cover the Khwarazmian conquest of Jerusalem (1244) and the Crusaders' defeat at the battle of La Forbie (1244).

In describing the Seventh Crusade under King Louis IX, the Rothelin quotes a letter from the king's chamberlain, John Sarrasin. When John writes of having been at sea for 22 days, the anonymous author takes that as a cue to digress on the perils of sea travel (sirens, Charybdis), which segues into a description of the dangers to be found on land (snakes, cockatrices). The result is an extended passage (chapters 45–58) full of legend and lore but also authentic Roman history, including the desert campaigns of Cato the Younger in Africa drawn from Lucan's Pharsalia. It also draws on Nicander and the medieval compendium called the Fet des Romains.

Chapter 59 returns to John Sarrasin's letter, which covers the events of 1249–50. The final chapters cover Louis's crusade and its failure, the Mongol invasion of Syria and its ultimate defeat at Ain Jalut (1260) and the coup d'état which brought Baibars to power in Egypt and ended the Ayyubid dynasty (1260). The last chapter tells how the new sultan expelled the Christians from Jerusalem and they made their way to Acre, the capital of what remained of the Kingdom of Jerusalem.

== Editions ==
- "Continuation de Guillaume de Tyr, de 1229 à 1261, dite du manuscrit de Rothelin", in Recueil des Historiens des Croisades. Historiens Occidentaux (Paris, 1844–1895), II, 526–556, 561–566.
- Janet Shirley, ed. "The Rothelin Continuation", in Crusader Syria in the Thirteenth Century: The Rothelin Continuation of the History of William of Tyre with Part of the Eracles or Acre Text (Ashgate, 1999), 13–120.
