= Estoire d'Eracles =

13th-century anonymous chronicle in Old French

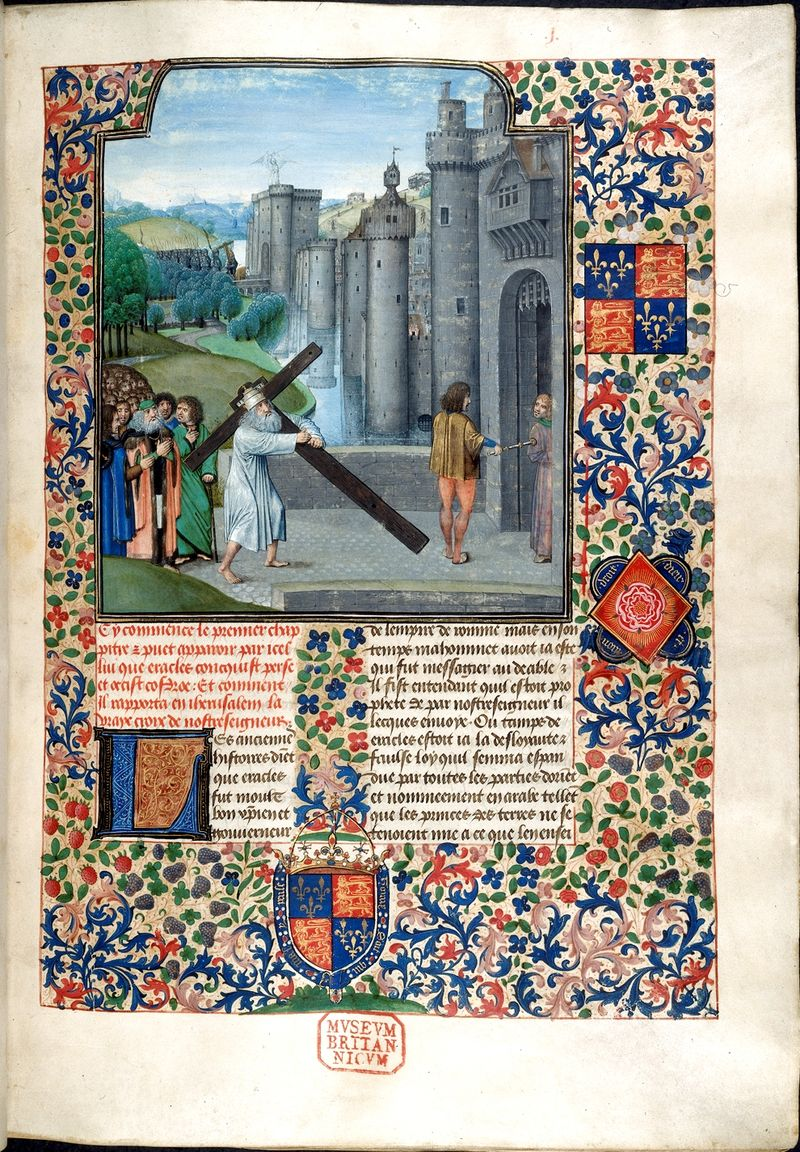
The emperor Heraclius carrying the True Cross into Jerusalem, from British Library MS Royal 15 E. i (15th century).

The Estoire d'Eracles ("History of Heraclius") is an anonymous Old French translation and continuation of the Latin History of Deeds Done Beyond the Sea by William of Tyre. It begins with recapture of Jerusalem by the Roman emperor Heraclius in AD 630, from which it takes its name, and continues down to 1184. The continuation recounts the history of the Crusader states from Saladin's capture of Jerusalem in 1187 down to 1277.

The translation was made between 1205 and 1234, possibly in Western Europe. Several times the text of the translation was changed and the manuscripts preserve different versions of William's text. The continuations were added to the translation between 1220 and 1277. There are two different versions of the first continuation, covering the years 1185–1225. Both reflect the political attitudes of the Crusader aristocracy. There are 49 surviving manuscripts of the Eracles. Of these, 44 contain a first continuation drawn from the Chronicle of Ernoul and five (the so-called Colbert–Fontainebleau manuscripts) contain a different version. Twelve of the manuscripts contain a unique continuation for the years 1229–1261 drawn from the independent work known as the Rothelin Continuation.

The continuations of the Eracles have varying historical value. The translation itself, insofar as it differs from the original, is of no historical value as an independent source. The Ernoul continuation is an invaluable source for the period from 1187 until 1204, including the fall of Jerusalem, the reign of Conrad of Montferrat, the establishment of the Kingdom of Cyprus, the Third Crusade and the Byzantine Empire down to the Fourth Crusade.

Although the Eracles has been published twice from different manuscripts versions, there has been no critical edition based on all the manuscripts.

== Bibliography ==
- Edbury, Peter W. (2015). "Ernoul, Eracles and the Beginnings of Frankish Rule in Cyprus, 1191–1232". In Sabine Rogge; Michael Grünbart (eds.). Medieval Cyprus: A Place of Cultural Encounter. Waxmann Verlag. pp. 29–52.
- Edbury, Peter W. (2016). "New Perspectives on the Old French Continuations of William of Tyre". Crusades. 9: 119–126.
- Edbury, Peter W. (2017). "Ernoul, Eracles and the Fifth Crusade". In E. J. Mylod; Guy Perry; Thomas W. Smith; Jan Vandeburie (eds.). The Fifth Crusade in Context: The Crusading Movement in the Early Thirteenth Century. Routledge. pp. 163–199.
- Handyside, Philip D. (2015). The Old French William of Tyre. Brill.
- McCormick, Michael (1991). "Estoire D'eracles". In Kazhdan, Alexander (ed.). The Oxford Dictionary of Byzantium. Oxford and New York: Oxford University Press. ISBN 0-19-504652-8.
- Morgan, Margaret Ruth, ed. (1973). The Chronicle of Ernoul and the Continuations of William of Tyre. Oxford University Press.
- Nicholson, Helen (2006). "Eracles". In Alan V. Murray (ed.). The Crusades: An Encyclopedia. Vol. 4 vols. ABC-CLIO. vol. 2, p. 405.
- Shirley, Janet, ed. (2016) [1999]. Crusader Syria in the Thirteenth Century: The Rothelin Continuation of the History of William of Tyre with Part of the Eracles or Acre Text. Routledge [Ashgate].
