= Sæwulf =

12th-century English pilgrim to Jerusalem

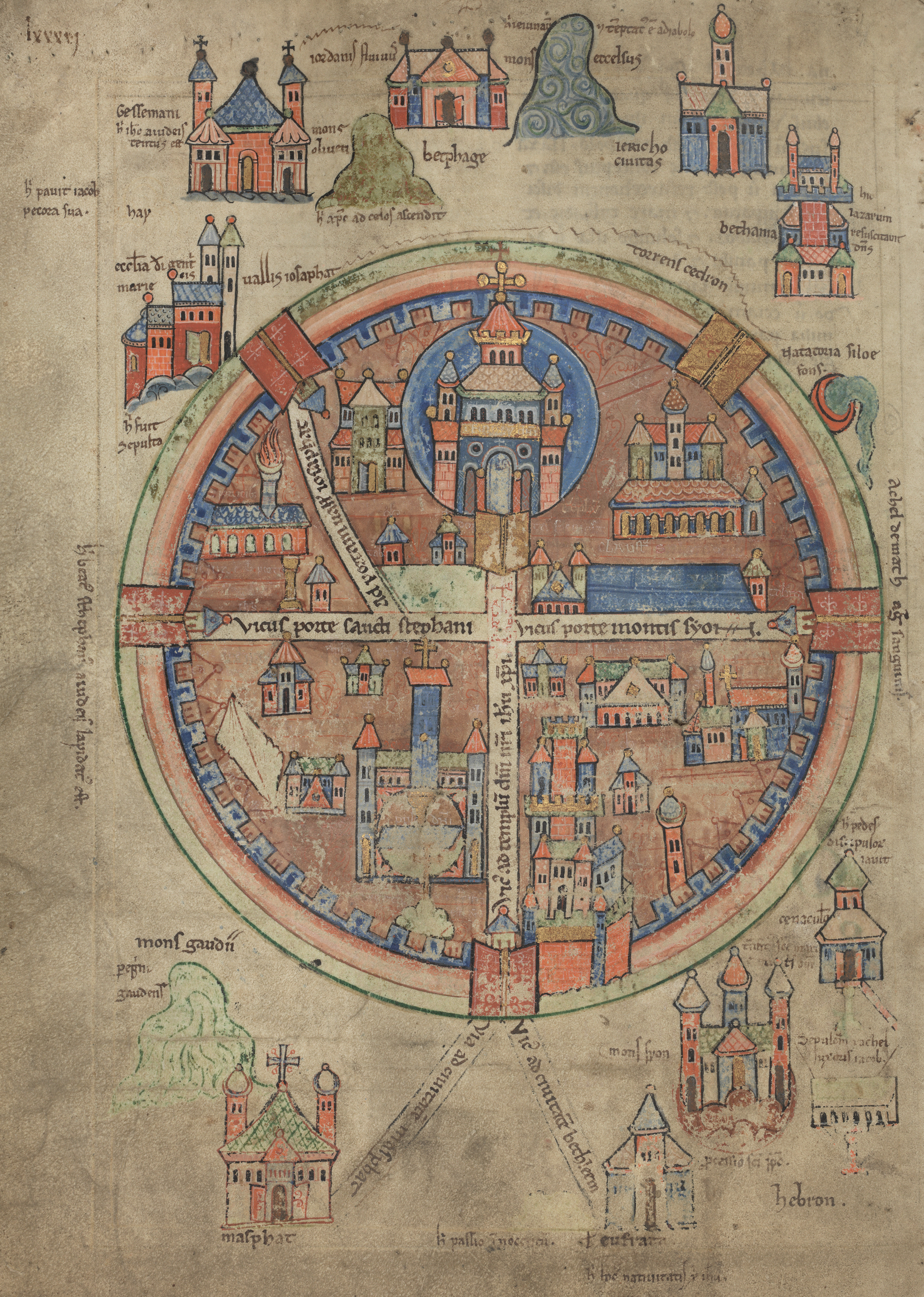
Illuminated manuscript depicting city map of Jerusalem under Crusader control, c. 1200s.

Sæwulf (Late Old English pronunciation: [ˈsæːwulf]; fl. 1102 – 1103) was probably the first English (Anglo-Saxon) pilgrim to Jerusalem following its conquest in the First Crusade. His Latin written account of his pilgrimage, Relatio de situ Ierusalem , tells of an arduous and dangerous journey; and Sæwulf's descriptive narrative provides scholars brief but significant insight into sea travel across the Mediterranean to the new Kingdom of Jerusalem that was established soon after the end of the First Crusade.

== Life ==
Given his Anglo-Saxon name, Sæwulf likely came from mainly Anglo-Saxon heritage rather than Norman descent. Though details of Sæwulf's life after his pilgrimage are uncertain, he is generally thought to be the Sæwulf (or Seuulfus) of Worcester mentioned by the distinguished English historian William of Malmesbury in his "Gesta Pontificum Anglorum" as a merchant who in his old age became a monk in Malmesbury Abbey in Wiltshire, England.

=== Pilgrimage ===
Sæwulf's telling of his travels on pilgrimage to the Holy Land start in Apulia on 13 July 1102 with his boarding ship at Monopoli. Three years earlier in 1099, Jerusalem fell to the Crusaders in a successful siege, reopening the city for Christian pilgrims. Via many ports, he made landfall at Jaffa and began a tour of Palestine, including Jericho and Hebron.

For his return journey, Sæwulf took a dromund from Jaffa on 17 May 1103. The galley was attacked near Acre by Saracen ships, but soldiers onboard defended the vessel allowing it to escape. They were attacked again on the voyage from Cyprus to Constantinople by pirates. Sæwulf's account abruptly ends after recounting passage through the Dardanelles.

=== Writing ===
For Jerusalem, Sæwulf related guidebook-like details highlighting important sites for pilgrims, including the Church of the Holy Sepulchre. He also visited Bethlehem, finding it, with the exception of a monastery, "all ruined".

The narrative of his journey to Jerusalem described the prevailing lawlessness of the Judean hills at the time. He noted the road between Jaffa and Jerusalem "was very dangerous... because the Saracens are continually plotting an ambush... day and night always keeping a lookout for someone to attack". He noted the presence of many corpses of pilgrims abandoned on and near the road, unburied because of the rough ground and reasons of safety, as "[a]nybody who did this would dig a grave not for his fellow Christian but for himself."

In 1839 Sæwulf's report was edited into French by Armand d'Avezac and from that translated into English by Thomas Wright who included it as the section "The Travels of Sæwulf" in his 1848 anthology "Early Travels in Palestine".

== See also ==
- Sea in culture
- Daniel the Traveller

== Work ==
- Sæwulf (1892). Saewolf (A.D. 1102, 1103). Palestine Pilgrims' Text Society.
