= Ludolf von Sudheim =

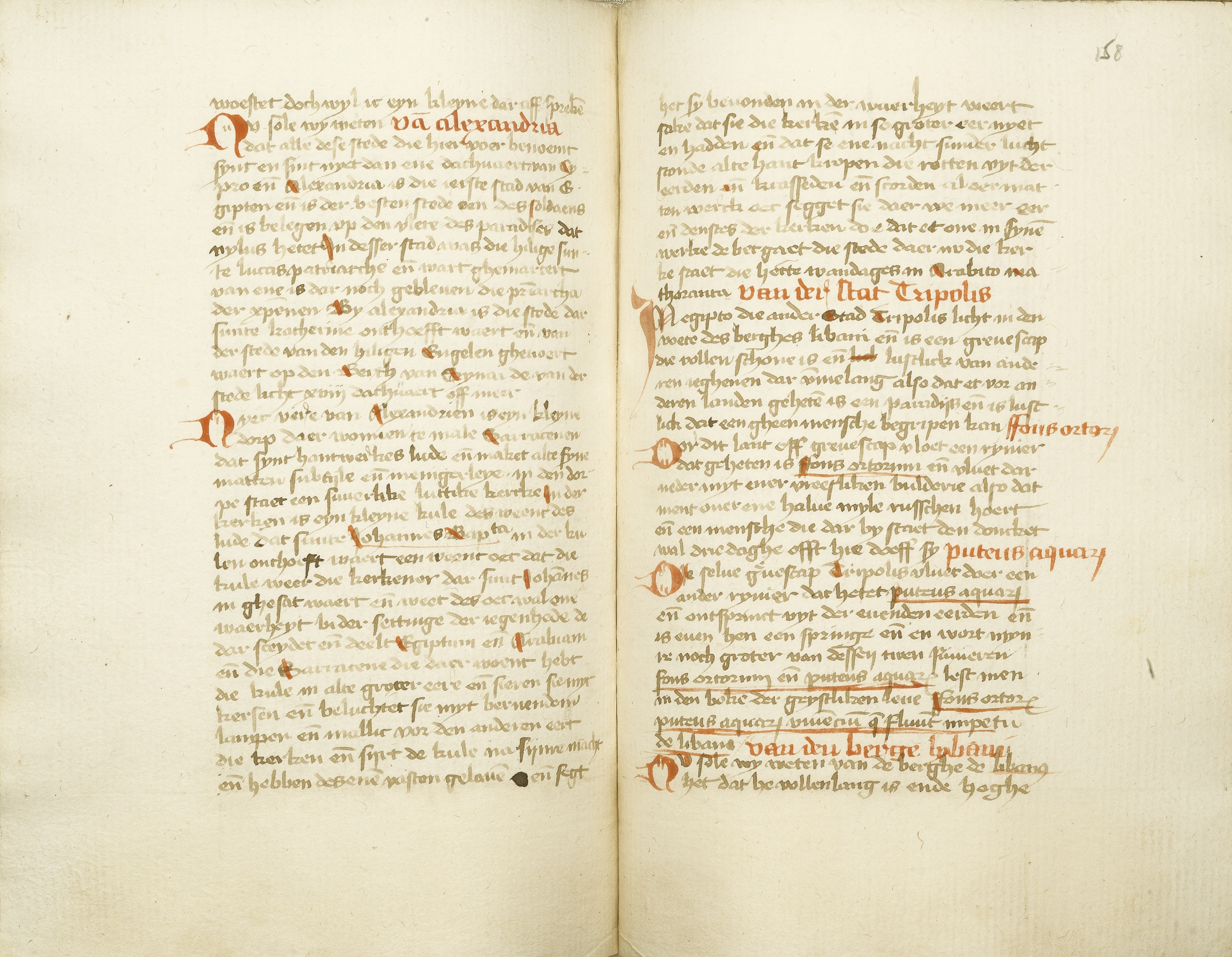
Manuscript of von Sudheim's travel journal

Ludolf von Sudheim, also called Ludolph von Suchem, was a German priest who is primarily known as the author of an account of his time in the Levant and a history of the fall of the Crusader states. Little is known of his life other than he spent the years 1336–1341 travelling in the Holy Land and the Eastern Mediterranean islands.

== Works ==
- von Suchem, Ludolph (1895) [Originally published in 1350]. De Terra sancta et itinere Iherosolomitano et de statu eius et aliis mirabilibus, que in mari conspiciuntur, videlicet mediterraneo [Ludolph von Suchem's Description of the Holy Land, and of the Way Thither. Written in the Year A.D. 1350] (Paperback). Edited and translated from Latin by Aubrey Stewart. Cambridge University Press. p. 158. ISBN 9781108061827. OCLC 830022640. ;
