= Antoine Régnault =

Antoine Régnault (16th century) was a French merchant and bourgeois from Paris, as well as a writer.

In 1549, he travelled to Jerusalem where he was dubbed Knight of the Holy Sepulchre.

== Works ==
In 1573 in Lyon, he published a book with the title Discours du voyage d'Outre Mer au Sainct Sépulcre de Iérusalem, et autres lieux de la terre Saincte about his pilgrimage to the Holy Land. The first part of the book is about the Chaldean Catholic teachings and of the ceremonies of reception of the Knights of the Holy Sepulchre in the old statutes allegedly from 1099. It also contains writings about the Veil of Veronica. The book finishes about Nicolas Chemin from Paris and other themes about knights, emperors, kings and royalties in France associated with the Crusades.
