= Bernard the Pilgrim =

Frankish monk and traveller to the Holy Land

- Other names: Bernard the Wise, Bernardus Sapiens
- Occupation: Monk
- Era: 9th century
- Notable work: Itinerarium

Bernard the Pilgrim (fl. 865), also called Bernard the Wise (Latin: Bernardus Sapiens) and Bernard the Monk, was a ninth-century Frankish monk. He is most recognisable for the composition of a travelogue, in which he details his journey around the Mediterranean, travelling through Italy, Egypt, the Holy Land, and France.

== Biography ==
Little is known about Bernard's life outside of the Itinerarium. The Frankish monk originated from the Champagne territory of France, later residing in the Monastery of Mont-Saint-Michel, located in the region of Brittany. Bernard is believed to have travelled sometime between the years 865 and 871.

== The Itinerarium ==
=== Date ===
The precise dates of Bernard's travels remain unclear, and is an issue which continues to be contested by historians. Some have claimed that Bernard travelled over a period of three years, from 867-870. The monk's acquirement of papal permission for his trip from Pope Nicholas I, who died in 867, has been deployed as evidence for the start year for Bernard's travels; the text's reference to the year 970 made by a tenth-century scribal editor, which has been deemed an error by exactly one hundred years, has been used to substantiate the claim for a three-year expedition. Leor Halevi suggests that there is no reason to believe that Bernard could not have travelled in the years preceding the Pope's death, however, positing the trip as having occurred anywhere between the years 865 and 871.

=== Structure and content ===
Bernard's Itinerarium is a ten-page tract logging the monk's journey around the Mediterranean. The text explores Bernard's travels throughout Italy, Egypt, the Holy Land and France. Accompanied by two monks, the Beneventan Theudemund and a Spaniard named Stephen (Esteban), Bernard documents his encounters with sacred sites and different people, recording his impressions.

Covering a vast number of regions and a distance of over 6000 kilometres, Bernard's journey allows for insight into Christian-Muslim relations in the ninth-century Mediterranean. In this respect, the tract is noteworthy for its production "at a time when hardly a Christian ventured willingly to the other side of the Mediterranean Sea". Halevi notes how the "account illustrates a largely unknown chapter in the history of the Christian encounter with Islam".

On his trip from Italy to Alexandria, Bernard claims to have witnessed the transportation of ships containing 9000 Beneventan Christian slaves. In actuality, this number is likely an exaggeration, denounced by Michael McCormick as "manifestly impossible", and it can be inferred that the number was probably closer to 900. Bernard further notes the Venetians' removal of Saint Mark's body from the monastery of Saint Mark in Alexandria.

The relative ease with which Bernard travelled to Arab-ruled Bari is noteworthy, given the dating of his travels to the period following the Arab raid against Rome. Towards the end of the text, Bernard attests to the peace which existed between Christians and Muslims in Jerusalem and Egypt, contrasting this to the volatile situation in Italy. To illustrate this point, Bernard claims that if, during his journey, his camel or donkey was to die, he would be able to leave his possessions unattended whilst visiting a different city to retrieve a new animal, and could return to find his belongings still there.

Throughout the text, Bernard documents the challenges he faced while sojourning the Mediterranean, the majority of which are rooted in his attempts to gain access to different regions. Before beginning his journey, Bernard expresses his need to gain permission from Pope Nicholas I (a litterae formatae or commendaticiae). While the monk achieves this with relative ease, he later notes having to gain letters from those such as the emir of Bari, Sawdan, to deliver to the leader of Alexandria, and a letter from the leader of Alexandria, to deliver to the ruler of Babylon (Old Cairo). It is in Old Cairo that Bernard details his six-day long imprisonment as a result of the ruler's distrust, reflective of this age as one of "mutual suspicions".

=== Stages of the itinerary ===
The main destinations visited by Bernard, in order, are as follows:

1. Rome
2. St. Michael cave shrine, Monte Gargano
3. Muslim emirate of Bari
4. Táranto
5. Port of Alexandria
6. Babylon of Egypt (Old Cairo)
7. Sitinuth (Menuph/Menouf?)
8. Maalla (El Mahalla El Kubra)
9. Damietta
10. Tanis
11. Ferama (Pelusium/Tell el-Farama)
12. Alariza (el-Arish)
13. Monastery of Saint George, Ramla
14. Fortress of Emmaus (Emmaus Nicopolis/Imwas)
15. Jerusalem
16. Valley of Jehoshaphat (upper Kidron Valley)
17. Mount of Olives
18. Sepulchre of Lazarus, Bethany (al-Eizariya)
19. Bethlehem
20. Monte Olevano (near Salerno)
21. Rome
22. Mont St-Michel

=== Influences on Bernard ===
Bernard makes explicit reference to his awareness of Bede's Ecclesiastical History, justifying his scarce discussion of the Holy Sepulchre as "Bede in his history says enough about it". The monk's description of Jerusalem is therefore notably brief, detailing a number of sacred sites and miracles which are afforded little more of a discussion than many of the other places Bernard visits.

== Commentary ==
William of Malmesbury references Bernard in his early 12th century work Gesta Regum Anglorum (History of the Kings of England). Mabillon published the Itinerarium in his Acta Sanctorum Ordinis Benedicti published in Paris in 1672.
