= Rorgo Fretellus =

Frankish priest (fl. 1119–1154)

Start of the Descriptio in the manuscript Paris, BnF, MS lat. 5129, copied in 1151–1157

Rorgo Fretellus, also spelled Fetellus (fl. 1119–1154), was a Frankish priest in the Kingdom of Jerusalem who wrote a widely circulated description in Latin of the Christian holy places in the Holy Land, the Descriptio de locis sanctis.

== Life ==
Fretellus was born in the County of Ponthieu and went to the Holy Land around 1110. In 1119 he was the chancellor of the Prince of Galilee and by 1121 he was a canon of the archdiocese of Nazareth. By about 1148 he had become the archdeacon of the patriarchate of Antioch, or perhaps of Nazareth.

== Work ==
The Descriptio de locis sanctis survives in several recensions, all descended from a model composed by Fretellus in 1128–1132 or possibly as early as 1119–1121. The earliest finished version dates to 1137 or 1138 and was dedicated to Jindřich Zdík, bishop of Olomouc. A revised version was also published by Fretellus either about the same time as the first or perhaps as late as 1148. Its dedication is subject to different interpretations. It was most likely dedicated to Count Rodrigo González de Lara, governor of Toledo, but according to one modern editor the dedication was in fact to a count of Toulouse, probably Count Raymond V. If this latter view be correct, the Descriptio must date to 1148 and the Second Crusade. A third version was produced at the Avignonese papal curia between 1356 and 1362, when Cardinal Nicolau Rossell incorporated into a copy of the Liber censuum.

The Descriptio is not a very original work. It incorporates much earlier material to which Fretellus had access in the library of the cathedral of Nazareth, including possibly Pseudo-Eugesippus' Tractatus de distantiis locorum Terrae Sanctae. Although "it does not tell us very much about the conditions in the towns and villages under Frankish rule", it is still a useful source on the learning to which a crusader cleric had access in the twelfth century. The Descriptio begins by describing the location of Jerusalem: "The city of Jerusalem is situated in the hill-country of Judea, in the province of Palestine". It is probable that in this famous passage Fretellus has simply combined his Biblical geography (Judaea) with the name of the former Arab province (Filasṭīn).

== Editions ==
- Macpherson, James Rose, ed. Fetellus (circa 1130 A.D.). London: Palestine Pilgrims' Text Society, 1896.
- Boeren, Petrus Cornelis, ed. Rorgo Fretellus de Nazareth et sa description de la Terre Sainte: histoire et édition du texte. North-Holland Publishing, 1980.
