= Daniel the Traveller =

Explorer from Kievan Rus

Daniel the Traveller, known also as Daniel the Pilgrim (Russian: Даниил Паломник, Ukrainian: Данило Паломник), Daniel of Kiev, or Abbot Daniel, was the first travel writer from the Kievan Rus'. He is known for travelling to the Holy Land in the aftermath of the First Crusade and his descriptions are important records of the region during that time. Some have identified him with a certain Daniel, bishop of Yuryev between 1115 and 1122.

== Travels ==

Archimandrite Daniel journeyed to the West from the Rus monastery where he lived as an igumen. This monastery was probably near Chernigov. Daniel's narratives begin at Constantinople. He began his travels in the early 12th century and was likely in Constantinople around 1106 to 1108. Daniel stayed in the Jerusalem area for over a year and took various trips around Palestine and Syria. During this time he explored the Dead Sea, Hebron, and Damascus. He learned much of the regions from his three major excursions to the Dead Sea and Lower Jordan (which he compares to the Snov River), Bethlehem and Hebron, and Damascus. Daniel wrote his journeys in narratives he titled Puteshestive igumena Daniila ("Pilgrimage of Daniel").

When coming to Jerusalem from Jaffa, he mentions that this was where ‘Saracens sally forth and kill travellers’, he also attested to several venerable sites that were ‘destroyed by the pagans’. When going to Lake Tiberias, he dodged ‘fierce pagans who attack travellers at the river-fords’ and lions that roamed the countryside in ‘great numbers’. He prayed for his life when he walked unescorted on the narrow pass between Mount Tabor and Nazareth as he was warned that local villagers do ‘kill travellers in those terrible mountains’. He survived the trip, returning to Kiev with a small piece of the rock from Christ’s tomb kept by him as a relic.

Daniel's description of the Holy Land preserves a record of conditions that are peculiarly characteristic of the time. He describes the Saracen raiding almost up to the walls of Christian Jerusalem and the friendly relations between Roman and Eastern churches in Syria. Daniel visited Palestine in the reign of Baldwin I of Jerusalem and apparently soon after the crusader capture of Acre in 1104. He claims to have accompanied Baldwin on an expedition against Damascus (c. 1107). Daniel's narratives show that Baldwin treated him with much friendliness. Daniel records that several of his friends from Kiev and Novgorod were present with him at the Easter Eve miracle in the Church of the Holy Sepulchre.

== Significance ==
Daniel's account of Jerusalem is descriptive and accurate. His observant and detailed record of Palestine is one of the most valuable medieval documents that exist. Daniel had some knowledge of both Greek and Latin and so was able to use interpreters. He writes, It is impossible to come to know all the holy places without guides and interpreters. He writes of a holy man of great learning, well advanced in years, who had lived in the Galilee for thirty years and had accompanied him in Palestine, however he made some major mistakes in topography and history. Daniel visited about sixty places in the area.

While Daniel was not the first traveller to leave the Rus, his travels were the first which there are written records of. There were warriors, merchants, and earlier pilgrims who had travelled from the Kievan Rus' to the outside world before the twelfth century; however, none left written records that have come down to the present day. Daniel was one of the first European travellers to travel long distances on foot and keep a written account of his travels – a travelog.

Daniel's narratives are also important in the history of the Old East Slavic language and in the study of ritual and liturgy of the time (i.e. description of the Easter services in Jerusalem and the Descent of the Holy Fire).

== Manuscripts ==
There are seventy-six manuscripts of Daniel's narratives of which only five are before the year 1500. The oldest of his narratives is dated 1475 of which three editions still exist in Saint Petersburg at the Library of Ecclesiastical History.

== Bibliography ==
=== Daniel's text ===
- Mme B. de Khitrovo, Itineraires russes en orient, (Geneva, 1889) (Societe de l'orient Latin); in French.
- Charles William Wilson, C.W. Wilson's edition (Palestine Pilgrims' Text Society, London, 1895) at holyfire.org. Accessed 6 September 2020.
- C.W. Wilson's edition from Colorado State University - Pueblo
- Abbot Daniel (1864). Pèlerinage en Terre-Sainte de l'igoumène russe Daniel au commencement du ... (in French). St. Petersburg: Académie Impériale des Sciences.

=== Nasir Khusraw's text ===
- Nasir Khusraw (1004–1088), A Journey through Syria and Palestine, translated and annotated by Guy Le Strange (1888). Palestine Pilgrims' Text Society, Vol IV.

=== Secondary literature ===
- Anzovin, Steven, Famous First Facts', H. W. Wilson Company (2000), ISBN 0-8242-0958-3
- C. R. Beazley, Dawn of Modern Geography, ii. 155–174. (C. R. B.), has the account of Daniel.
- I. P. Sakharov's (St Petersburg, 1849), Narratives of the Russian People, vol. ii. bk. viii. pp. 1–45.
- Merriam-Webster's Encyclopedia of Literature, Merriam-Webster (1995), ISBN 0-87779-042-6
- C.W. Wilson, ed., The Pilgrimage of the Russian Abbot Daniel to the Holy Land, 1106-1107 A.D. (London, 1895).
