= John Phokas =

John Phokas (Byzantine Greek: Ἰωάννης Φωκᾶς, romanized: Iōánnēs Phōkâs, IPA: [i.oˈan.nis foˈkas]) or Phocas (Medieval Latin: Johannes Phocas, IPA: [joˈan.nes ˈfɔː.kas]) was a 12th-century Byzantine pilgrim to the Holy Land. He wrote an account of his travels, the so-called Ekphrasis or Concise Description of the Holy Places, (Note: The full title of the work is Ἔκφρασις ἐν συνόψει τῶν ἀπ’ Ἀντιοχείας μέχρις Ἱεροσολύμων κάστρων καὶ χωρῶν Συρίας, Φοινίκης καί τῶν κατὰ Παλαιστίνην ἁγίων τόπων συγγραφεῖσα παρὰ Ἰωάννου ἱερέως τοῦ εὐσεβεστάτου Φωκᾶ, υἱοῦ Ματθαίου, μοναχοῦ τοῦ ἐνασκοῦντος ἐν Πάτμῳ τῇ νήσῳ, ὅσπερ εἶδεν τοὺς ἁγίους τόπους ἐν ἔτει τῷ ͵ϛχπε΄ τῷ τότε καιρῷ (Ékphrasis en Synópsei tō̂n ap’ Antiocheías Méchris Hierosolýmōn Kástrōn kaí Chōrō̂n Syrías, Phoiníkēs kaí tō̂n katà Palaistínēn Hagíōn Tópōn Syngrapheîsa parà Iōánnou Hieréos toû Eusebestátou Phōkâ, Hyioû Matthaíou, Monachoû toû Enaskoûntos en Pátmō tē̂ Nḗsō, Hósper Eîden toús Hagíous Tópous en Étei tō̂ ...schpé tō̂ Tóte Kairō̂).) which has been called "the most elegant of Palestinian pilgrimage accounts". Doubt has recently arisen over whether Phokas was in fact the author of the Ekphrasis, which has been re-attributed instead to the John Doukas who went on an imperial mission to the Holy Land in 1177.

Little biographical information about Phokas is available. One manuscript of the Ekphrasis contains a note stating that he was a priest and that his father, a certain Matthew, became a monk on Patmos. According to this marginal note, his trip to the Holy Land took place in either 1177 or 1195. He is known to have accompanied Byzantine Emperor Manuel I (r. 1143–1180) on an expedition to the sea off Attaleia. He may be the same person as the "Focas" who, according to the Annales Herbipolenses, was sent by Manuel in 1147 to guide the crusading army of King Conrad III of Germany from Nicaea to Iconium.

Phokas's Ekphrasis is both concise and precise. He had a rather positive attitude towards the Crusaders. In some cases he provides unique information. He describes a fanatical Saracen sect called the Chasisioi (perhaps the Assassins). He calls the river Jordan "the holiest among rivers" and names three monasteries in the vicinity of site of the baptism of Jesus dedicated to Our Lady of Kalamon, John Chrysostom and John the Baptist. The latter was rebuilt, he says, by Manuel I. He also reports that Cana was nothing more than a kastellion (a small fortified settlement), that there were two monasteries (one Greek, one Latin) atop Mount Tabor, and that the site of ancient Jericho was covered in gardens and vineyards.

Besides the Bible, Phokas also quotes from such ancient authors as Flavius Josephus and Achilles Tatius. The Ekphrasis may have been written against the pilgrimage account of Constantine Manasses, who returned from the Holy Land disillusioned and wondering why Christ lived there. In the Ekphrasis, the beauty of the places is stressed repeatedly.

== See also ==
- Phokas (Byzantine family)
