= Ernoul =

Ernoul was a squire of Balian of Ibelin who wrote an eyewitness account of the fall of Jerusalem in 1187. This was later incorporated into an Old French history of Crusader Palestine now known as the Chronicle of Ernoul and Bernard the Treasurer (French: La Chronique d'Ernoul et de Bernard le trésorier), often abbreviated Ernoul-Bernard. The chronicle covers the years from 1100 until 1228. A few manuscripts copied for Bernard, treasurer of Corbie Abbey, extend the narrative down to 1232.

== Authorship ==
Ernoul himself is mentioned only once in history, and only in his own chronicle. He was a squire of Balian of Ibelin, an important crusader noble in Jerusalem, and accompanied his lord on an embassy from King Guy of Jerusalem to Count Raymond III of Tripoli in 1187. Balian and his retinue remained behind for a day at Nablus during the voyage to Tripoli; the rest were ambushed at the Battle of Cresson on May 1. It was Ernoul who investigated the almost-empty Templar castle of La Fève before news of the battle reached Balian. No other mention is made of Ernoul. However, it is clear that he was at the Battle of Hattin on July 4, as his chronicle gives an account from the rearguard, which was commanded by his master Balian.

According to M. R. Morgan, the squire Ernoul was the same man as Arneis of Gibelet, who was an important noble in the crusader Kingdom of Cyprus in the first half of the 13th century, and must have been connected to the Ibelins, who were also important there; the Gibelets had strong ties to the Ibelins throughout the 12th and 13th centuries in both Jerusalem and Cyprus. This identification is rejected by Peter Edbury, who suggests that Arneis lived too late to be Ernoul, and also that their names are too dissimilar.

== Chronicle ==
The Chronicle of Ernoul is found in a number of separate but similar manuscripts, stemming from an original source that does not survive but assumed to have been written by Ernoul himself. The basis of these is a 13th-century Old French translation of the Latin chronicle of William of Tyre, who wrote in the Kingdom of Jerusalem in the mid- to late-12th century. This French translation came to be known as the Estoire d'Eracles, because William of Tyre began his chronicle with the reign of Byzantine emperor Heraclius.

One of the more important manuscripts is known as the Lyon Eracles, which is the basis of modern editions. It was edited by Morgan as La Continuation de Guillaume de Tyr (1183–1197). This manuscript continues until 1248, and the section containing the years 1184–1197 is not found in any other manuscript. The 19th century Recueil des historiens des croisades, a collection of crusade texts compiled by the Académie des inscriptions et belles-lettres, used a different version of the Eracles known as the Colbert-Fontainebleau Eracles. There is also a shorter manuscript known as the abrégé, and a Florentine Eracles from the Laurentian Library in Florence which has a unique section from 1191 to 1197 and continues until 1277.

The text known as The Chronicle of Ernoul and Bernard the Treasurer, edited by L. de Mas Latrie in the 19th century, has a separate manuscript tradition. It is essentially the same as the abrégé, and appears to have been produced from the French translation of William of Tyre, which was then mostly removed except for a few sections. It carries on until 1227 or 1231, depending on the manuscript.

The surviving texts were written in their final form from the 1230s to the 1250s. Ernoul himself may have written only a small part, covering the years 1186 and 1187, in which Balian and the Ibelin family feature prominently.
