= Mary's Well =

Sacred water well in Nazareth

Coordinates: 32°42′24.16″N 35°18′5.62″E

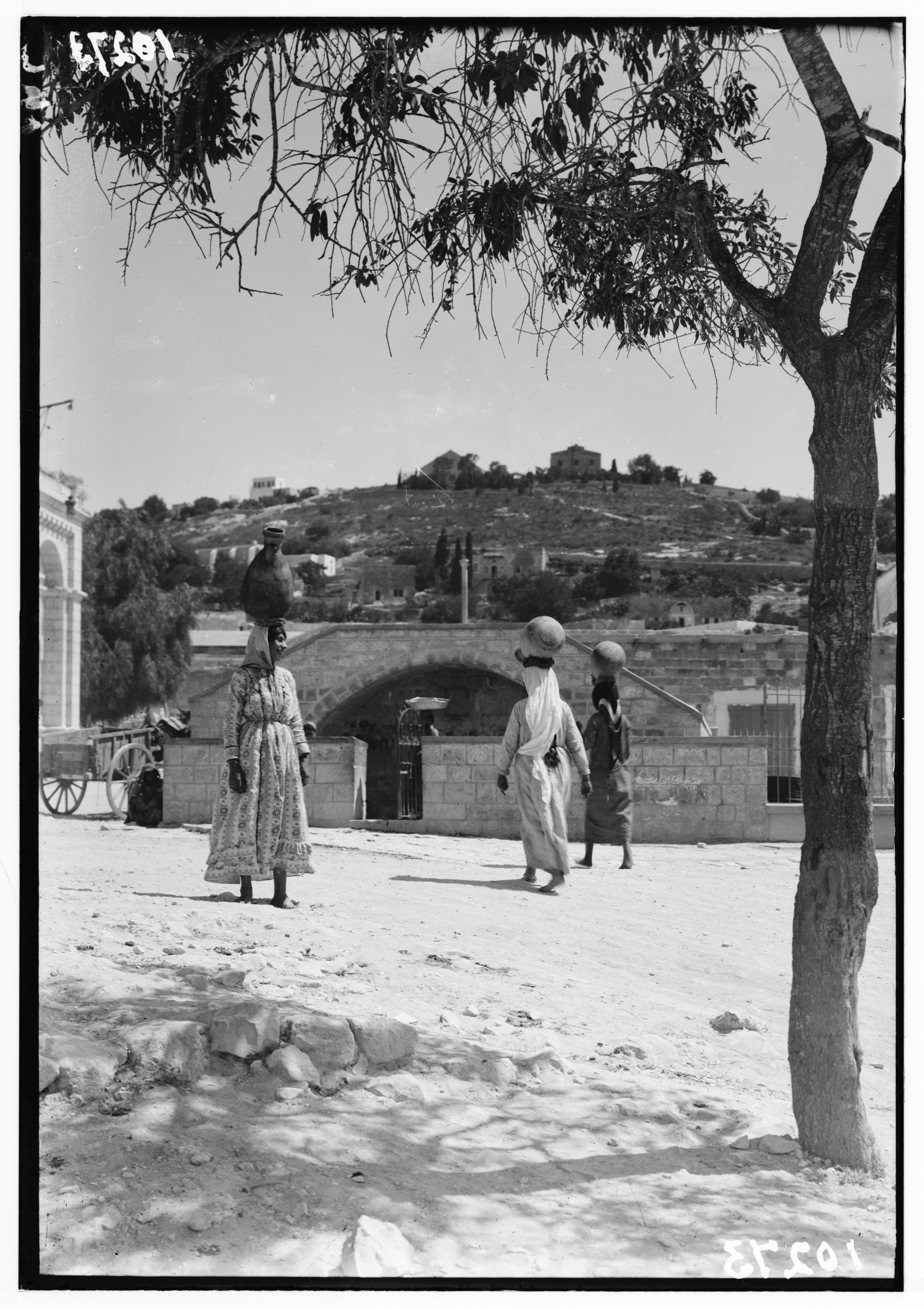
At Mary's Well circa 1934-1939

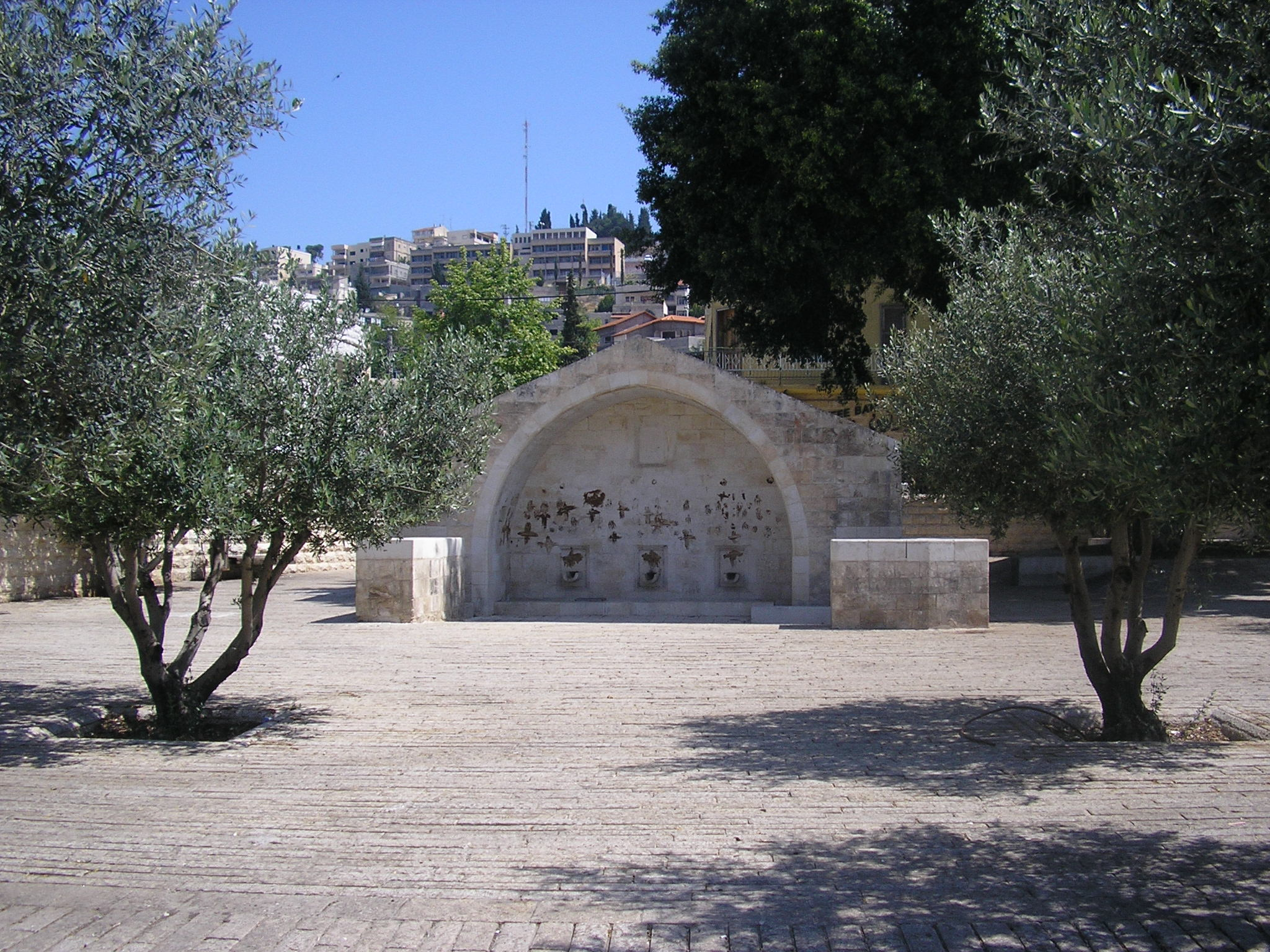
Mary's Well in Nazareth, 2005.

Mary's Well (Arabic: عين مريم , Ain Maryam, or Arabic: عين العذراء, ʿAin al- ʿadhrāʾ, "The spring of the Virgin")) is a freshwater spring reputed to be located at the site where, according to one Christian tradition associated with the apocryphal Gospel of James, Archangel Gabriel appeared to Mary, mother of Jesus, and announced that she would bear the Son of God – an event known as the Annunciation. It has been further associated in the past with episodes from another apocryphal infancy gospel, the Infancy Gospel of Thomas.

Two adjacent sites historically fed by the same spring are popularly known as Mary's Well – the spring underneath the Greek Orthodox Church of the Annunciation (also known as St. Gabriel's), and the well structure in the plaza to its south - which served as the sole water source of the village until the nineteenth century, and continued to be used by those without plumbing or home cisterns well into the twentieth century. Originally on the outskirts of Nazareth and seen as a sanctified source by both the Christian and Muslim inhabitants and Christian pilgrims from around the world for nearly two millennia, as the city expanded, it became a central square and meeting place for the Palestinian community and is a symbol of the city.

== In religious texts ==
=== Gospel accounts ===
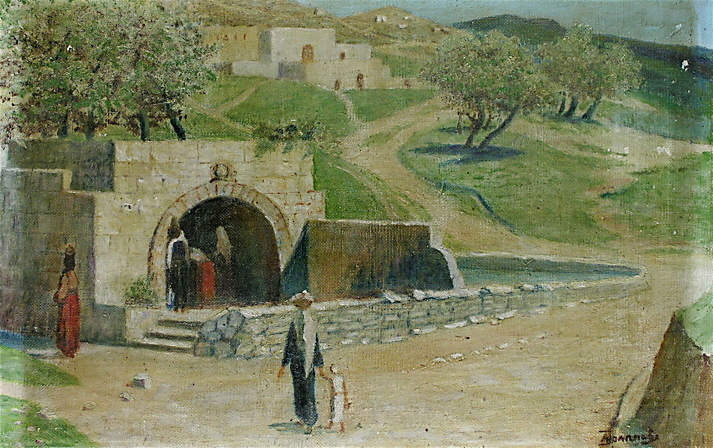
Painting imagining how the well might have looked in the 1st century AD (Vasily Dmitrievich Polenov)

The earliest account placing the Annunciation or first encounter between Mary and the angel Gabriel at a well or spring comes from the Protoevangelium of James, a non-canonical gospel dating to the 2nd century. The author writes:

"And she took the pitcher and went forth to draw water, and behold, a voice said: 'Hail Mary, full of grace, you are blessed among women.'"

The Infancy Gospel of Thomas mentions the boy Jesus breaking the jar he was supposed to bring water with from the well, but miraculously carrying the water in his mantle instead.

=== Quran ===
The Quran records a spirit in the form of a man visiting a chaste Mary to inform her that the Lord has granted her a son to bear, without referencing the drawing of water, but records a stream of water coming up from the ground at her feet when she was giving birth of Jesus in the same passage of the Quran: Surah 19:16-25.

== Hydrology ==
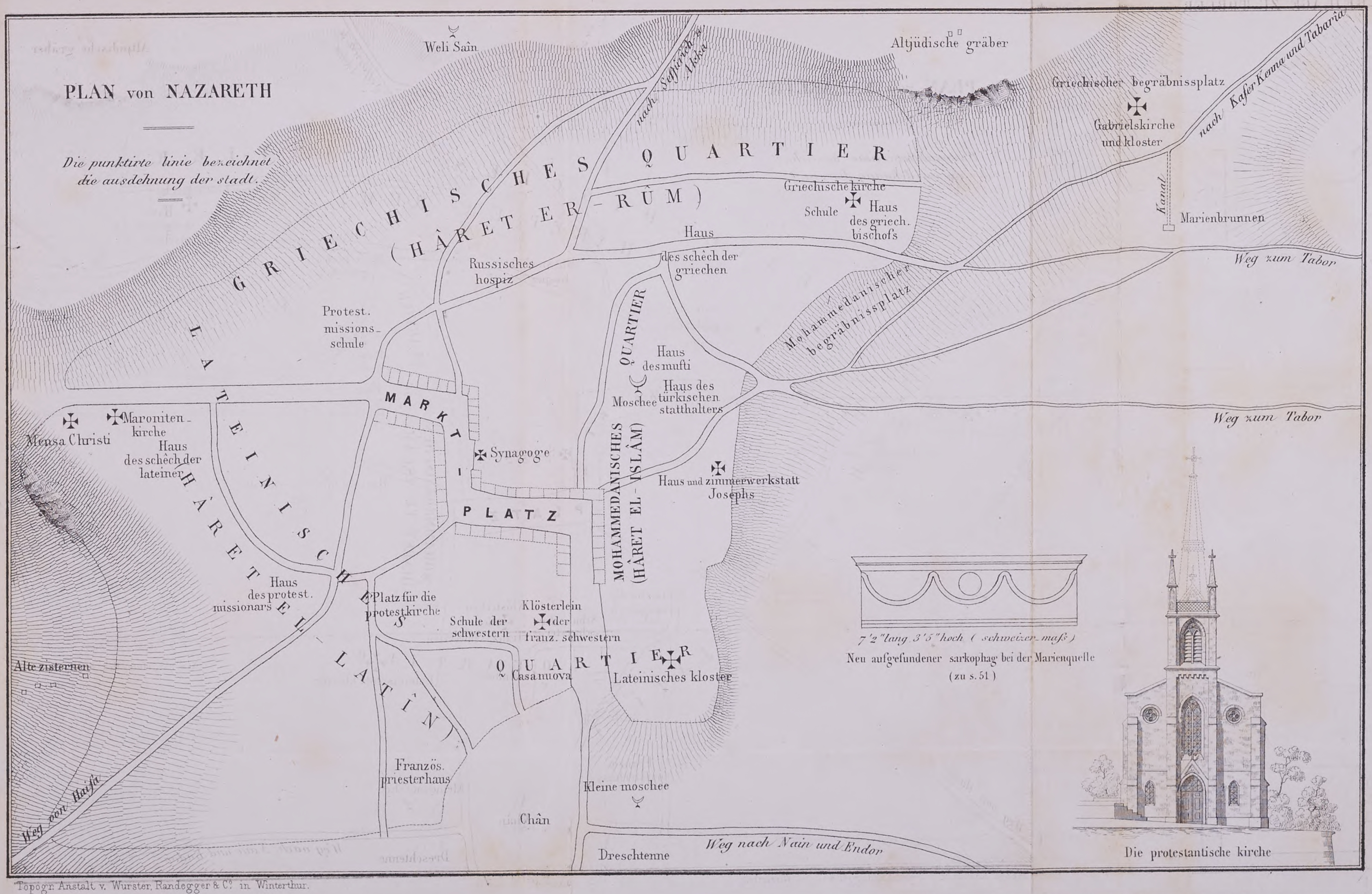
Titus Tobler's 1868 map of Nazareth: top right is the "Greek Church" (spring underneath); at bottom-center is the "Latin monastery" (today surrounding the rebuilt Basilica of the Annunciation)

The spring water in Nazareth emerges from a natural spring in Jabal al-Sikh and travels in underground rock-cut channels, some natural, others carved, channeling the water to spots where it can be drawn inside the Greek Orthodox Church of the Annunciation and to the public fountain of Mary's Well 130 metres (430 ft) away. This spring was the only perennial water source serving Nazareth in ancient times and was then located 500 metres (1,600 ft) to the north of the village center. It is fed by three other underground water sources, one also in Jabal el-Sikh and the other two in Jabal al-Sa'in. A smaller spring known as the Apostle's Fountain would only emerge in the rainy season along the western slopes of the village.

== History and archaeology ==
=== Early Roman period ===
Excavations by Yardenna Alexandre and Butrus Hanna of the Israel Antiquities Authority in 1997-98, sponsored by the Nazareth Municipality and the Government Tourist Corporation, discovered a series of underground water systems, and two of the rock-cut channels were dated to the Roman period (c. 2nd-4th century). These, along with Roman era potsherds and numismatic finds from the same period, indicate continuous activity at the site in this early period.

=== Byzantine and Early Islamic periods ===
The site known today as Mary's Well was in use as the main water supply of the then village in Byzantine Palestine. In a text attributed to Egeria in which she describes her visit to Nazareth in c. 383, she mentions that there is a spring at the village limits where Mary is said to have drawn water.

Arculf, a pilgrim to the Holy Land from the seventh century, told the Irish abbot Adomnán the story of his travels, and Adomnán wrote it down. Arculf described having heard of "a very clear spring, frequented by all the citizens, who draw water from it, and from the same spring water is raised in vessels to the church above by means of wheels." Oddly, he seems to have mixed up the church at the outer limits of the village (where the spring was) with the church in the center of the village (now the Basilica of the Annunciation), as the account placed the spring in the latter, though there is no spring there, only a cistern. The confused account was subsequently used to bolster pilgrimage to the Basilica. Yardenna Alexandre counts the account, inaccurate as it is, to be the oldest record of a Byzantine church of the Annunciation erected above the spring outside Nazareth.

It is speculated that sometime in this early period, channels were used to make the spring water accessible to those from outside the church, as it would close during the night hours, and because people filling their vessels and watering their flocks would disturb prayers at the church. Archaeological excavations did find that channels were carved out in the preceding early Roman period were reused during this period.

=== Crusader period ===
At the time of the Crusaders' Kingdom of Jerusalem (1099-1187), Nazareth was made a metropolitan see and a new fountain house was built at the site to serve the public and pilgrims. An account by Saewulf (1101-1102) describes a spring of clear water around which stood marble pillars and panels. A few years later, the Russian Orthodox abbot Daniel (1106-1108) gives a detailed account of the spring and its location:

"Then we left this town and went a little way to the north east where we found a wonderful well which was deep and very cold, and to reach the water you must go deep down on a stairway. And above this well there is a church dedicated to the Archangel Gabriel, and it is round. It is a good bow shot from the town of Nazareth to this holy well - At this well took place the first Annunciation of the Archangel to the Holy Mother of God."

Theodorich also describes the water pouring out of a marble lion's head, attesting to the ornamentation added by the Franks' reconstruction.

Many accounts from this period from pilgrims associated with Western church mention the spring and fountain house without mentioning the church, whereas pilgrims from the Eastern church do mention the church, indicating it was an Orthodox church. For example John Phocas recalls seeing it at the entrance to the village when approaching it from neighbouring Saffuriyya in 1185 and he mentions a fresh spring bubbling forth clear water in the grotto of the church.

=== Mamluk period ===
Even after Baybars captured Nazareth in 1265 and evicted all the foreign Christians from the village, pilgrimages to the site continued, and there are several descriptions from them between the thirteenth and fifteenth centuries that mention "The Fountain of St. Gabriel" or "The Fountain of Jesus and Mary". While some of these descriptions place the fountain inside the church, others describe the public fountain outside the church structure. James of Verona locates the clear spring at a distance of two bow shots from the Latin Church of the Annunciation and as adjacent to the partially destroyed Orthodox chapel, and recounts the traditional belief that Mary and Jesus drank and drew water from it. Niccolò da Poggibonsi also places the spring of "St. Gabriel" next to the church of the same name, and describes the church as still in use. The Russian monk Grethenios describes the fountain as covered by a square vault resting on marble columns, while Francesco Suriano also describes it as a covered basin, surrounded by a wall with steps going down to it.

Archaeological evidence attests to the importance of the public fountain to the life of the villagers in Nazareth, with extensive remains of glass jewellery and vessels, pottery and coins from this period, many of which were thrown in the fountain, providing further evidence of its sacrality among both Muslims and Christians alike, who were aware of and kept alive the tradition of Mary's use of the well. It was a center for activity, not just in drawing water, but also merchants who came to sell their wares where people were gathering. The fountain house during this period underwent constant renovations and maintenance.

Glass remains dating to this period include omons (perfume sprinkler) and conical windowpanes with green glass which wete commonly used in bathhouses (see section below).

=== Ottoman period ===
The "fine" and "good" waters of the fountain adjacent to the church of St. Gabriel, which is alternately described and being in ruins or in use, are mentioned by several visitors to Nazareth in the sixteenth century, among them Greffin Affagart in 1533, Boniface of Ragusa in 1564, and Jan van Kootwijck in 1598. Between 1620 and 1626, Franciscus Quaresmius provides several detailed descriptions of the spring, both inside the chapel of the church, which is underground and reached by stairs, and outside. He says the fountain outside the chapel serves the water into a marble vase beside which there is also a pool. He also is the first traveller to mention the seasonal waters provided by "The Fountain of the Apostle" which he says are collected inside the Mensa Christi Church on the western hillside.

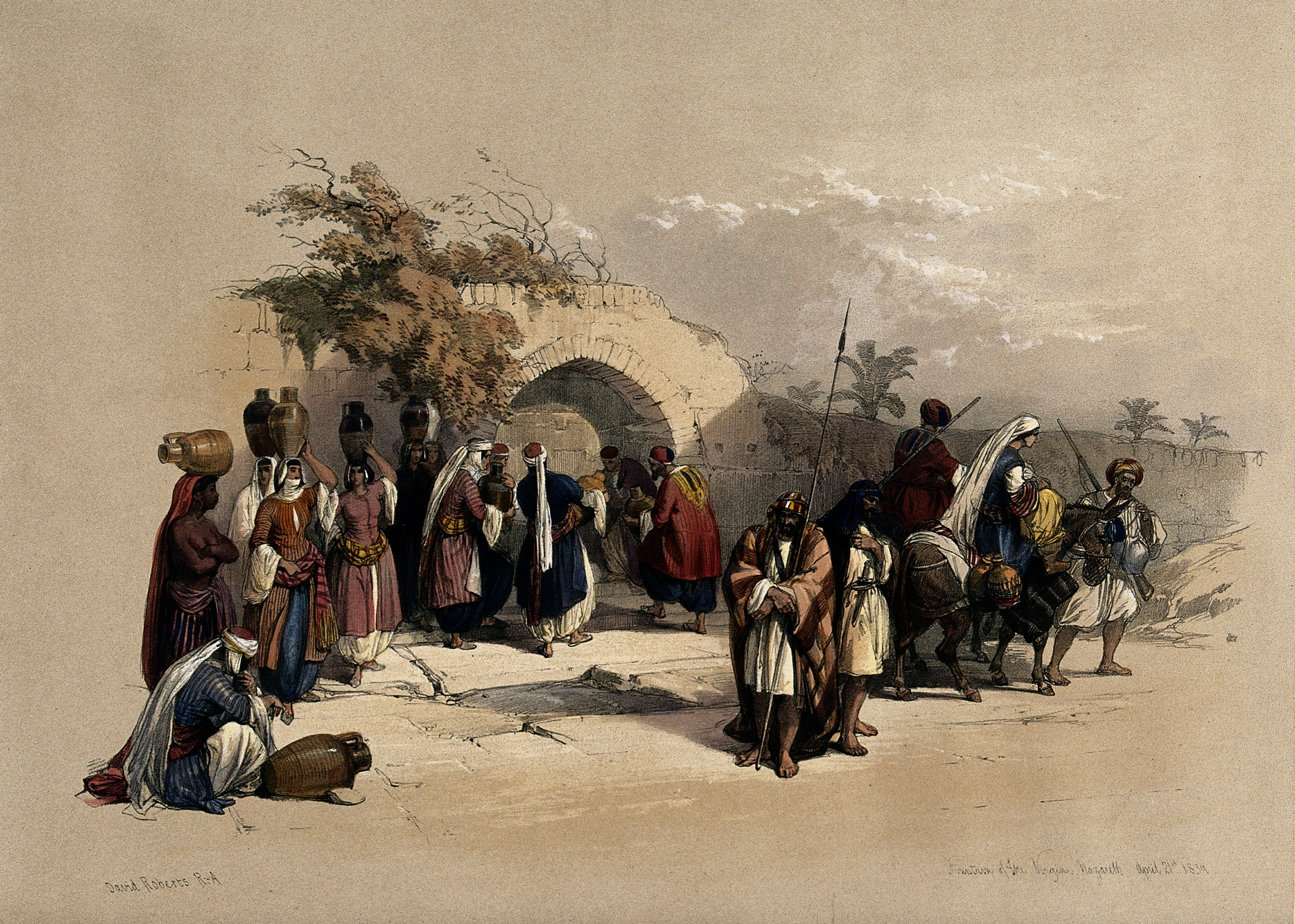
Mary's Well in 1839, by David Roberts, from The Holy Land, Syria, Idumea, Arabia, Egypt, and Nubia

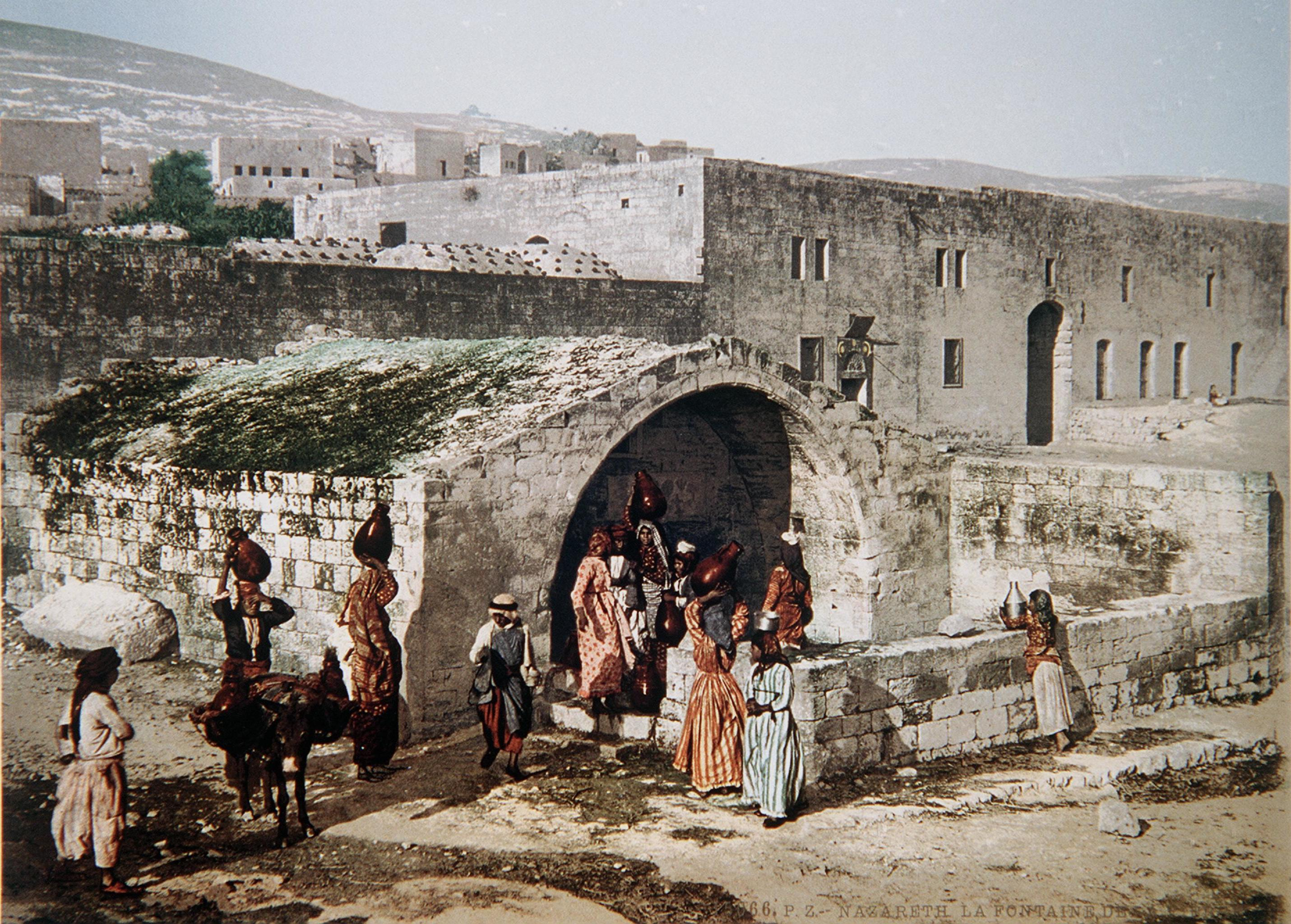
Well of St. Mary, by Felix Bonfils, ca 1880

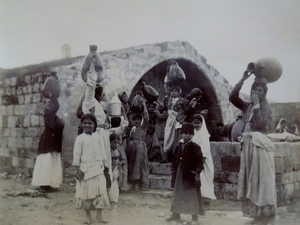
Women and children at Fountain of the Virgin, Nazareth, 1891

William Rae Wilson describes "a well of the Virgin, which supplied the inhabitants of Nazareth with water" in his book, Travels in Egypt and the Holy Land (1824).

James Finn, then British consul in Jerusalem, visited Nazareth in late June 1853 and his company pitched their tents near the fountain - the only fountain there. He writes that "the water at this spring was very deficient this summer season, yielding only a petty trickling to the anxious inhabitants. All night long the women were there with their jars, chattering, laughing, or scolding in competition for their turns. [...] It suggested a strange current of ideas to overhear pert damsels using the name of Miriam (Mary), in jest and laughter at the fountain of Nazareth"

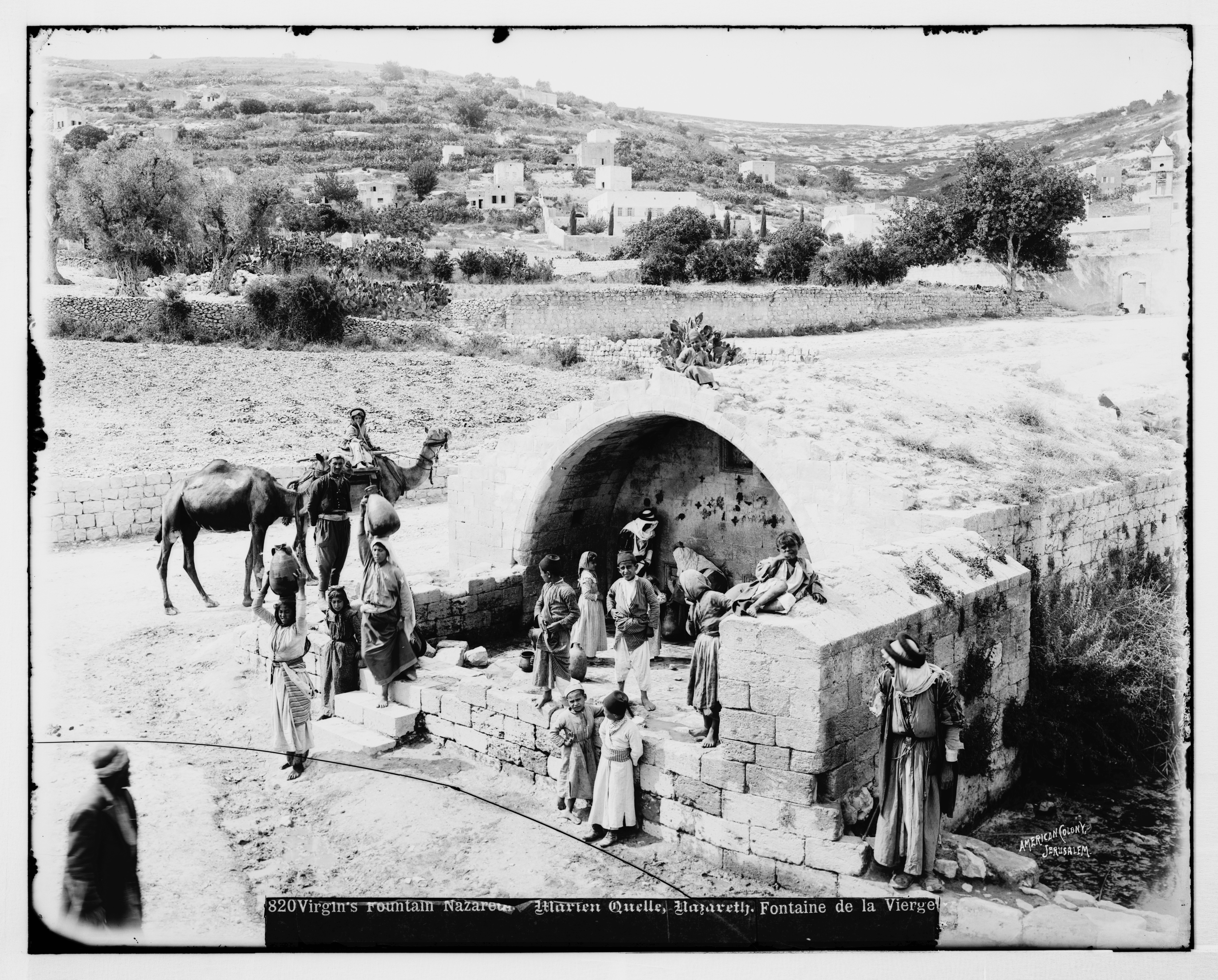
From the Library of Congress, view of the Virgin's Well (c. 1898-1914)

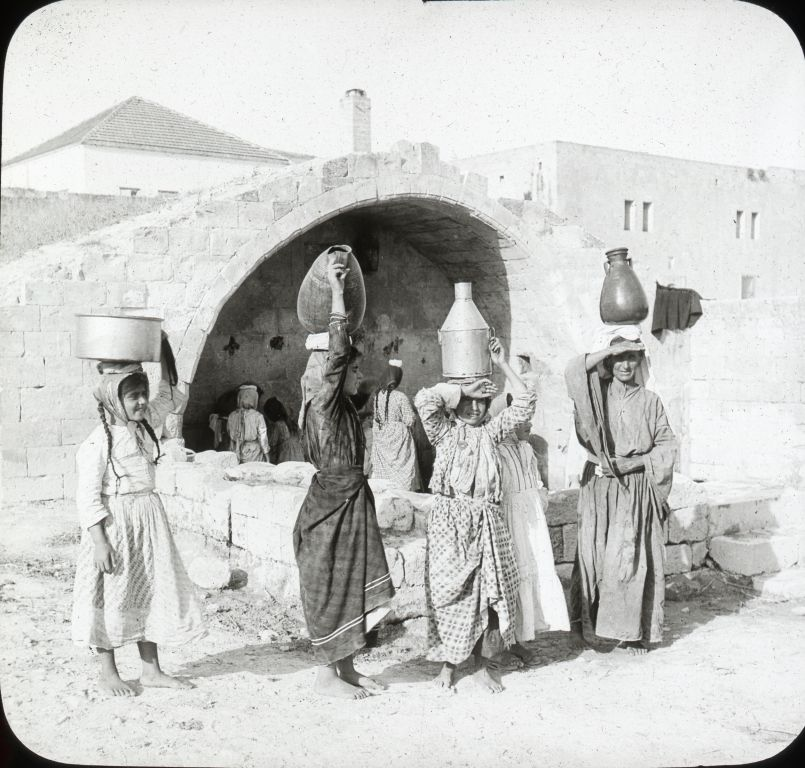
Photograph at the well c. 1910 from the Oregon State University collection

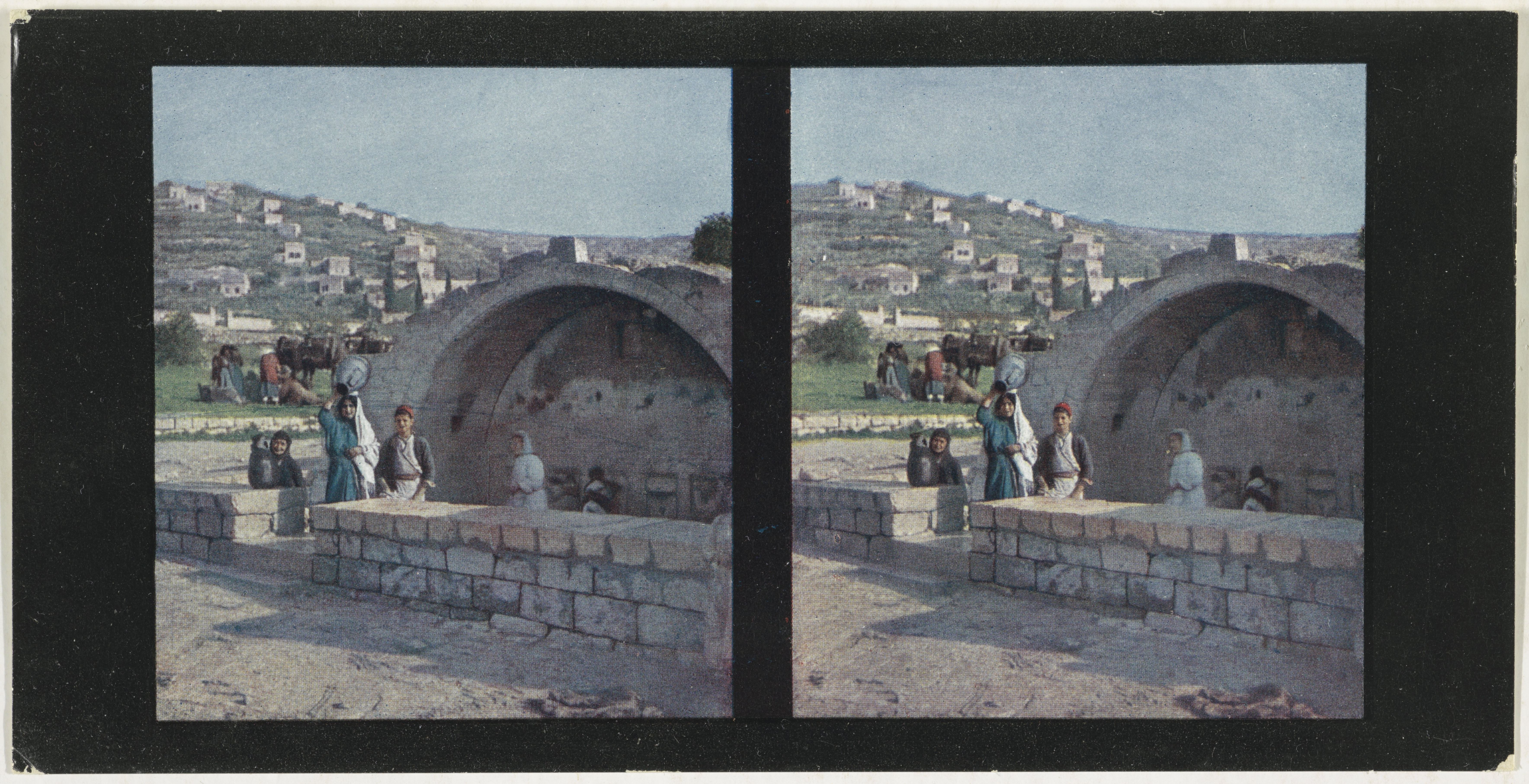
Stereophoto circa 1911-1919

Rapid population growth over the course of the 19th century placed serious strain on the available water supply from the spring leading to shortages, a priblem not solved until a 1911 intervention. The problem was compounded by the fact that the spring water was left to simply continuously flow from three stone outlets in the fountain, with the excess being reabsorbed into the ground.

=== British Mandate period ===
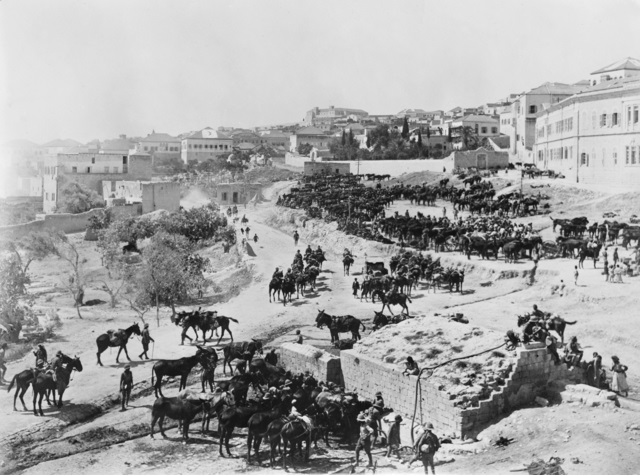
British cavalry watering their horses at Mary's Well in 1918

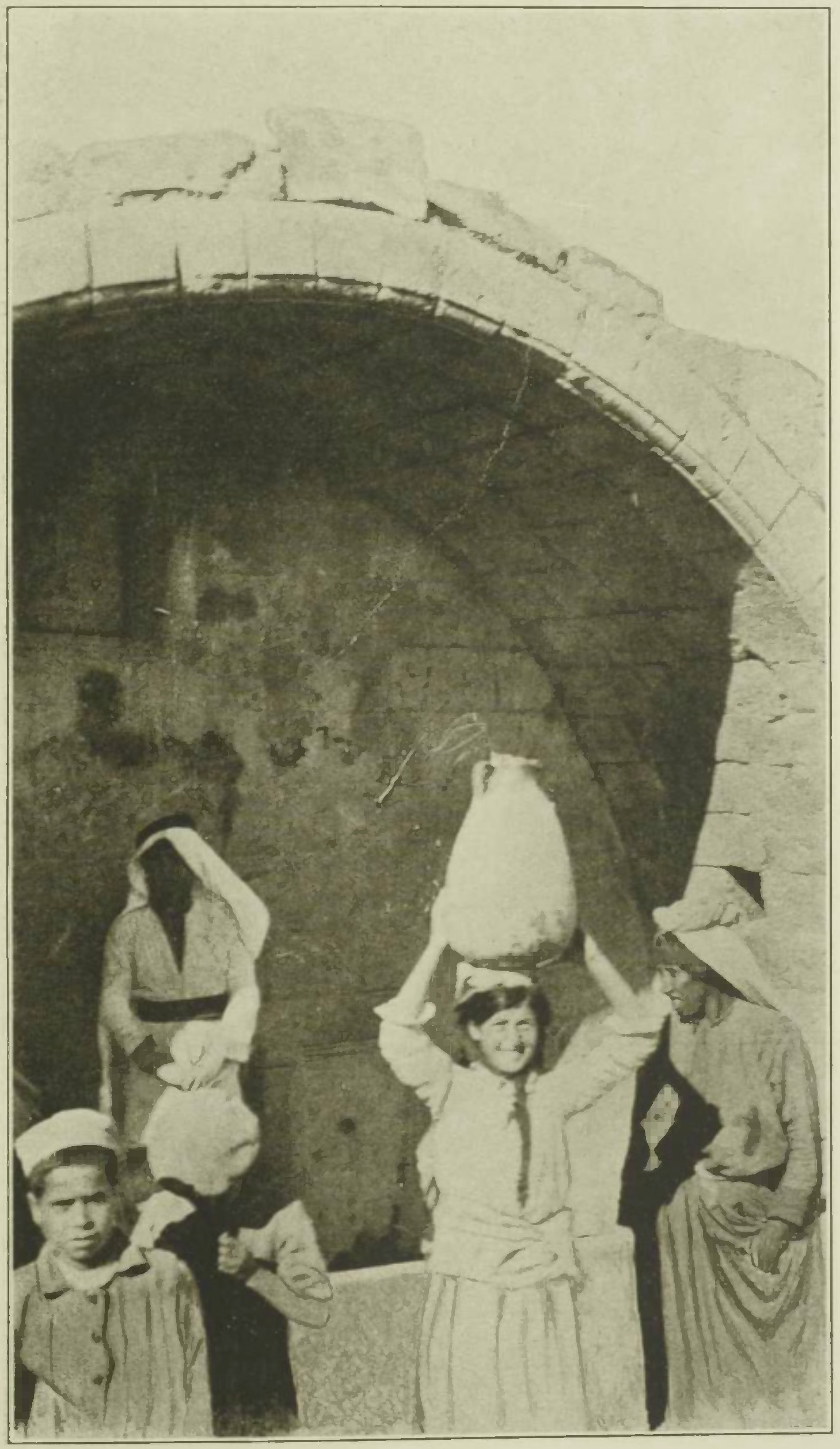
1923 photograph

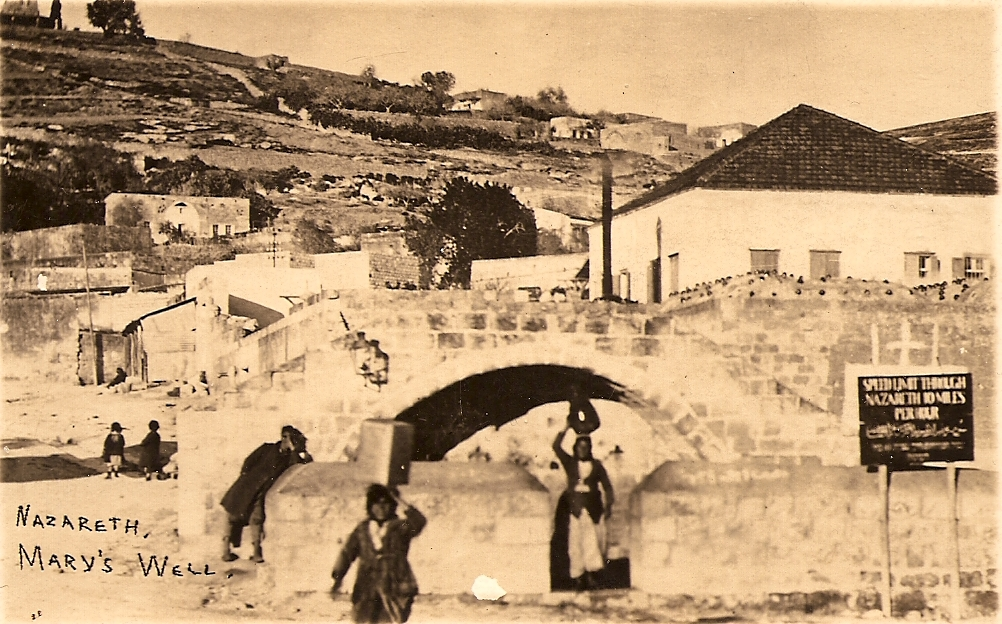
Postcard of Mary's Well, photographed by Karimeh Abbud, ca 1925

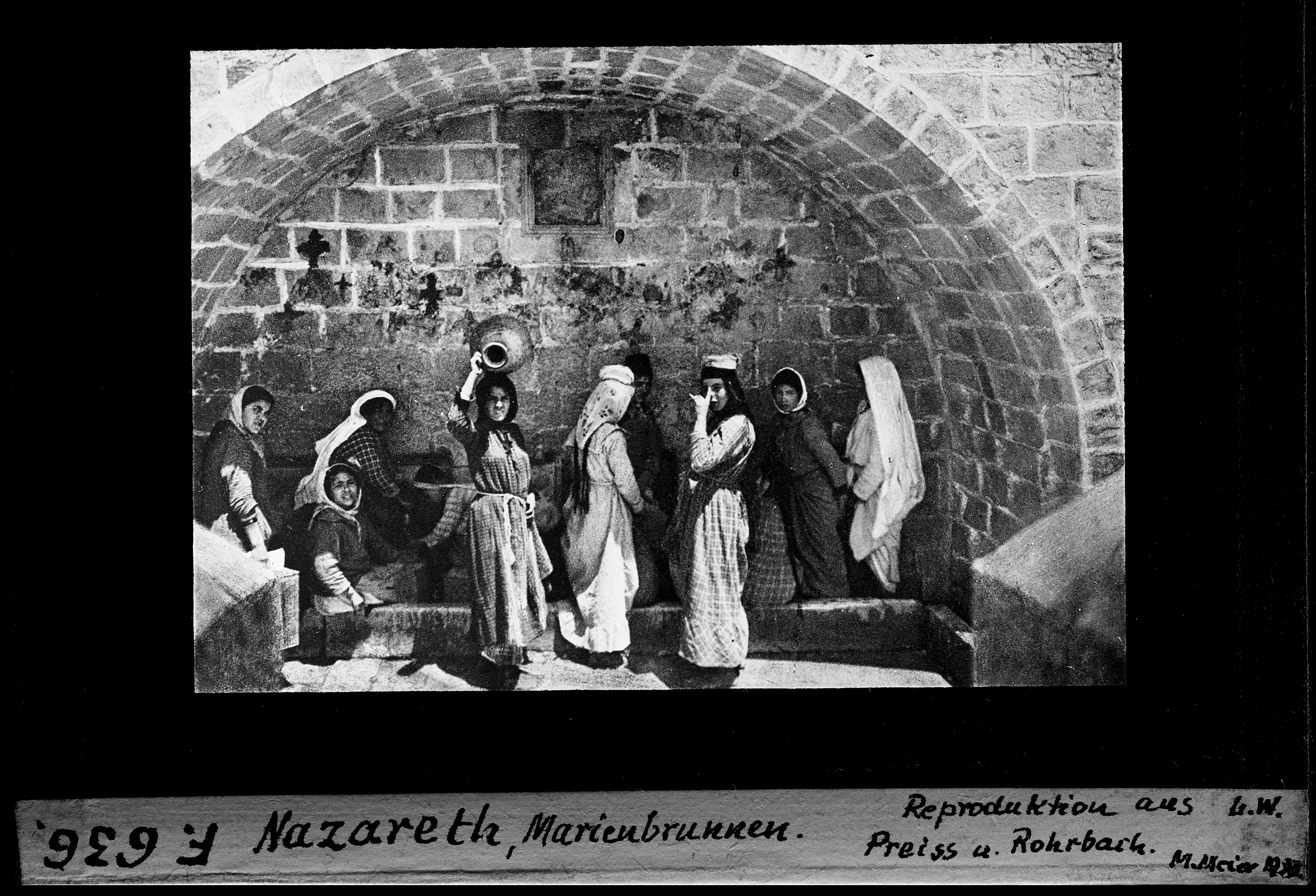
Photographed by Leo Wehrli (1933)

The increasing water problem and imperfect technical solutions of the 19th century were solved in 1911 by installing iron pipes within the stone water channels, topped with self-closing brass taps at the point of delivery, and saving overflow water in underground cisterns instead of letting it go to waste. The project was overseen by Amin Abdul Hadi, the Ottoman governor of Nazareth, and implemented by Gottlieb Schumacher, the German district engineer of Acre.

Well into the twentieth century, the public fountain continued to serve as Nazareth's main water supply and villagers would gather here to fill water pitchers or otherwise congregate to relax and exchange news.

==== Ain Umm el-Qasab spring ====
At another area in the Sharqiya quarter further downhill at a spring known as Ain Umm el-Qasab, shepherds and others with domesticated animals would bring their herds to drink during the first half of the 20th century.

=== Israel ===
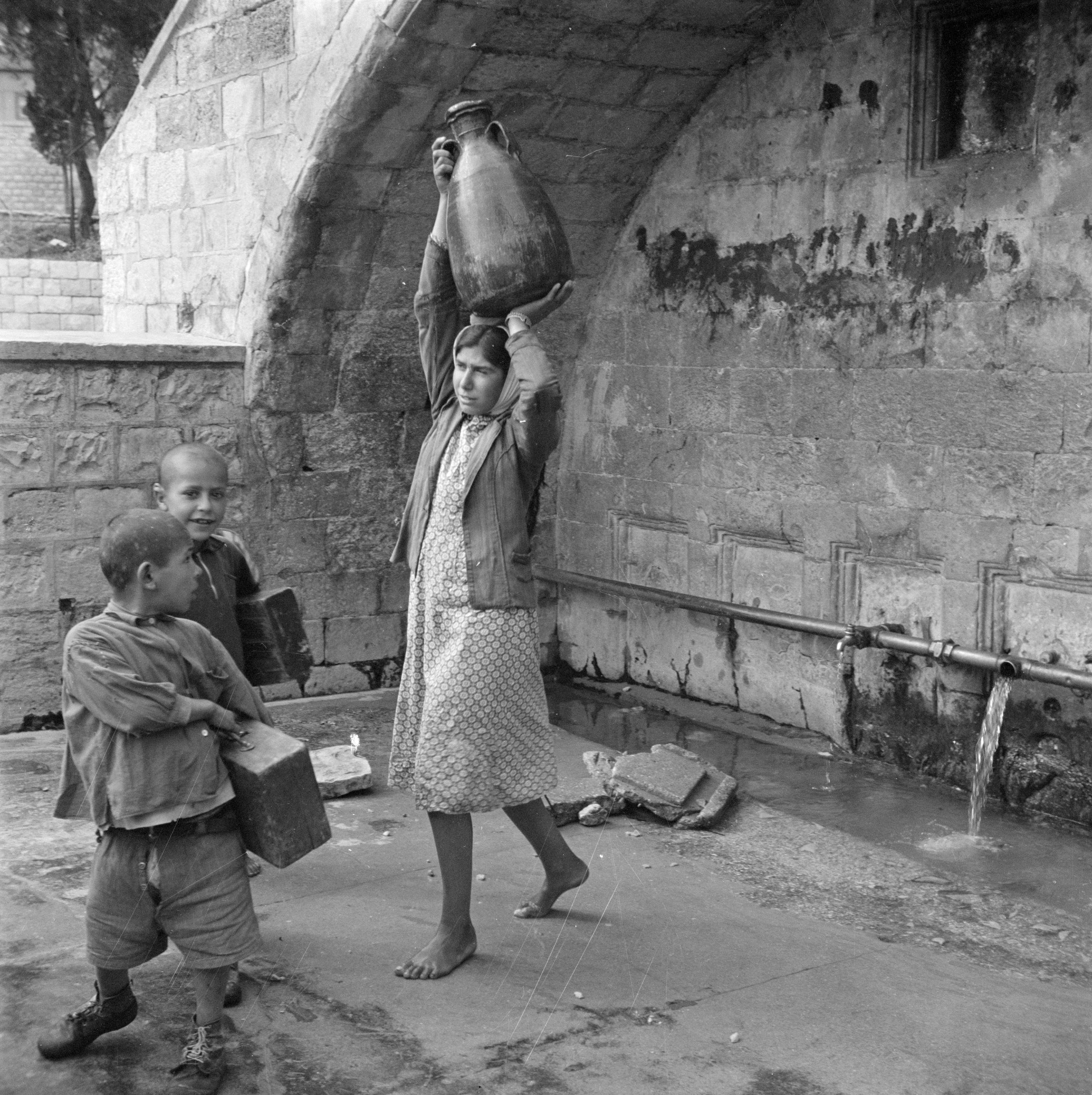
Woman and children filling water at the well in 1948-1949

Children filling water at the well in 1955, photographed by Fritz Cohen

Following Israel's establishment in 1948, in the 1950s, municipalities were asked to choose and design logos, and Nazareth's selected a depiction of Mary's Well for its own.

The daily public use of the well as a water source came to end in the 1960s when the municipality cut off the water leading from the church to the public fountain citing contaminants found, and while the water was cut, it was decided to rebuild the fountain structure. The design was unsuccessful, using a new kind of stone and without accommodating any flow for the spring. Following consultations with elders, another reconstruction was undertaken in the 1990s, using the same traditional stone and style of the Ottoman-era fountain. The water, when it does flow, no longer comes from the spring, and is instead provided by the Israeli water company Mekorot. The reconstruction was inaugurated as part of the Nazareth 2000 celebrations. According to Fu'ad Farah, "the Orthodox community supported replacing the structure, because then pilgrims and tourists could note that because of its newness it was not a traditional site", the traditional site he meant being the "spring" inside the Orthodox church.

== Ancient water installations ==
Amateur as well as professional archaeological work near the well has produced data on ancient water installations including a bathhouse. The dates for the latter are as yet inconclusive, suggesting it was built in the Mamluk period (see article).

== Bibliography ==
- Alexandre, Yardenna (2012), Mary’s Well, Nazareth: The late Hellenistic to the Ottoman Periods, Guy Bar-Oz, Ariel Berman and Noa Raban-Gerstel, Israel Antiquities Authority
- Emmett, Chad F. (1995). Beyond the basilica: Christians and Muslims in Nazareth. University of Chicago Press. ISBN 0-226-20711-0. OCLC 30735259. At archive.org: see here.
- Pringle, D. (1998). The Churches of the Crusader Kingdom of Jerusalem. Vol. II: L-Z (excluding Tyre). Cambridge University Press. ISBN 0-521-39037-0.
- Sharif-Safadi, Sharif (2013). "Mary's Fountain: The Symbol of the City of Nazareth". To the Fountain. The Maiden and the Jar: A Local and Multicultural Image (PDF). Tel Aviv: Eretz Israel Museum. pp. 41 [e]-48 [e], 66–79. Pages marked [e] are in English, the rest are in Hebrew. Exhibition catalog. Curator: Prof. Nurith Kenaan-Kedar. Printing: Shavit Press.
- Slyomovics, Susan (2009). "Edward Said's Nazareth". Framework: The Journal of Cinema and Media. 50 (1/2). Drake Stutesman, Wayne State University Press: 9–45. doi:10.1353/frm.0.0034. ISSN 0306-7661. JSTOR 41552537.
