= List of Christian holy places in the Holy Land =

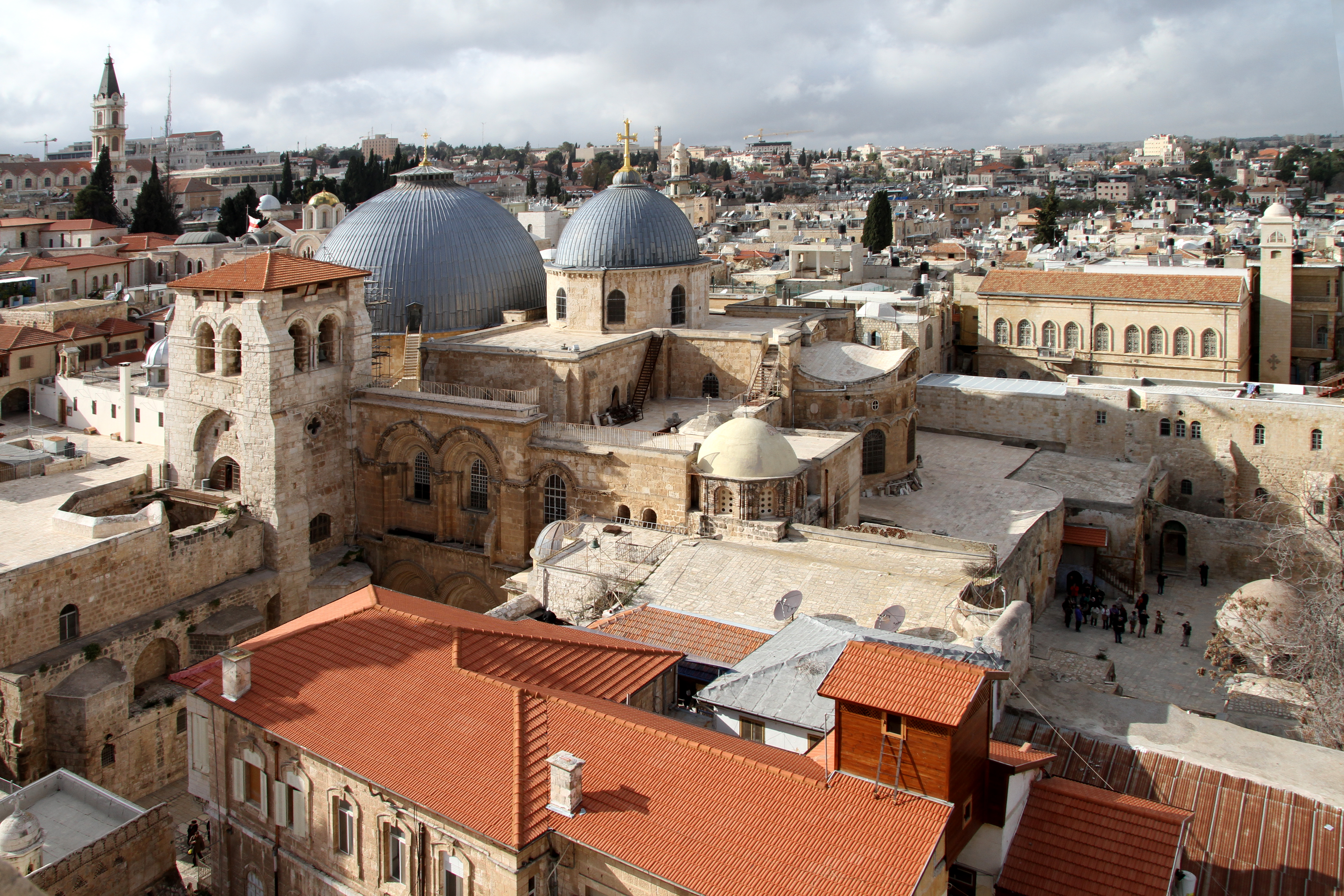
Church of the Holy Sepulchre: Jerusalem is generally considered the cradle of Christianity.

The list of Christian holy places in the Holy Land outlines sites within cities located in the Holy Land that are regarded as having a special religious significance to Christians, usually by association with Jesus or other persons mentioned in the Bible.

The identification of the Christian holy sites became of increased importance especially from around the time of Constantine the Great of the Roman Empire. Interest was also strong during Emperor Charlemagne, as was also the case during the Crusades, when Christian pilgrims often sought out holy places in the Outremer, especially in early 12th century immediately after the capture of Jerusalem.

The search for the Christian holy places was the foundation of 19th-century European Biblical archaeology in Ottoman Syria and later in the British Mandatory Palestine.

== Definition ==
The primary holy places are connected to the main events in the life of Jesus. Other holy sites are associated with events from the Old Testament, the lives of Mary, John the Baptist, and the Apostles, with endless more associated with later Christian saints, holy men and women, and local traditions. Different Christian denominations all have their particular sites and preferences. Some were only venerated in a particular period and were replaced in later times, and some have been proposed by archaeologists, but have not gained yet much traction due to a lack of tradition or continuity thereof. That leads to a wide range of places that have been venerated, forgotten, (re)discovered, and so forth. Some local traditions are only regionally accepted, and some holy figures and their related sites are recognised only by national Churches. Therefore, this list will always remain incomplete by definition.

The Holy Land is a loose notion. It covers territories which are mainly part of, or controlled by (from north to south), Syria, Lebanon, Israel, Palestine, Jordan, and Egypt. Some cities and sites mentioned in the Bible are farther afield.

Main Christian holy (purple) and historical (yellow) places in the Levant.

== Judea ==
Judea was a region inhabited mainly by Jews. Today it is split between Israel and the West Bank, Palestine, the latter parts being occupied by Israel.

=== Jerusalem ===
Jerusalem was the main city of Judea and the historical capital of the Kingdom of Judah, occupied at the time by Rome. It is the site of some of Jesus' teaching; of the Last Supper from which the Holy Eucharist evolved; of his crucifixion on a nearby hill, Golgotha or Calvary; and of his entombment.

- Temple Mount: Jesus was brought as an infant to the Temple. He was found there at the age of twelve discussing with the elders. He threw out the money changers from the Temple grounds.
- Golgotha, the site of Jesus' crucifixion and the Tomb of Jesus are traditionally located in the Church of the Holy Sepulchre (the Garden Tomb is an alternative site considered by a number of evangelical Anglicans to be site of Golgotha). Located next to the Church of the Holy Sepulchre is the Evangelical-Lutheran Church of the Redeemer.
- Via Dolorosa, the traditional "Way of Sorrows" walked by Jesus from his trial by Pilate to the site of execution
- Mount Zion, with the Cenacle (the site of the Last Supper) and the nearby site of the Dormition of Mary
- Mount of Olives, whose western flank is facing Jerusalem (for sites on its eastern side see Bethany and Bethphage). Here are the traditional sites of a cave in which Jesus taught his disciples, of the Ascension of Jesus and, in the Orthodox tradition, of the Assumption of Mary
- Gethsemane, the site of the Agony in the Garden marked by the Church of All Nations. Nearby is the Tomb of Mary.

=== Other sites ===
- Mount of Olives (eastern flank, facing the Judaean desert; for its western side see Jerusalem) with Bethany (the home of Martha, Mary and Lazarus) and Bethphage (Jesus' starting point towards his triumphal entry into Jerusalem; see Palm Sunday).
- Bethlehem, where the Church of the Nativity is believed to mark the birthplace of Jesus. The nearby Shepherds' Fields in the modern village of Beit Sahour is the traditional site of the angel's visitation to the shepherds to announce the birth of Christ.
- Emmaus has been identified by Byzantines, Crusaders and archaeologists with at least four different locations
- Jericho, where Jesus restored sight to the blind Bartimeus and met with Zacchaeus
- Mount of Temptation at Jericho, where Satan twice attempted to tempt Jesus (Matthew 4:8)
- The road from Jericho to Jerusalem, along which the parable of the Good Samaritan is located

== Jordan River ==
The Jordan River borders several regions from the time of Jesus - Gaulanitis and Galilee, Decapolis, Samaria, Perea and Judea.

- The Jordan River: John the Baptist preached and baptised at several sites along the river. The most important site is that of the Baptism of Jesus, traditionally identified with the site of Al-Maghtas on the East Bank in Jordan and extending onto the West Bank at Qasr al-Yahud.

== Tetrarchy of Philip ==
The Tetrarchy of Philip, the son of Herod the Great, included parts of today's Golan Heights and covered territories northeast of the Galilee.

- Caesarea Philippi; the region in which the confession of Peter took place

== Galilee ==
Biblical Galilee is nowadays mainly in Israel, with a small part in southern Lebanon. It was inhabited mainly by Jews, but with a substantial number of other communities.

- Nazareth is Jesus's hometown and the scriptural place of the Annunciation, venerated at the Grotto of the Annunciation and the apocryphal site at Mary's Well, with a host of other minor holy places
- Cana of the Galilee is the town where Jesus made his first miracle by turning the water into wine. Several sites have been venerated as biblical Cana, of which all but one are today in Israel and one in Lebanon.
- Mount Tabor, traditional site of the Transfiguration of Jesus
- Sepphoris, identified some Crusaders as the place where the Virgin Mary has spent her childhood, with a site in Jerusalem being another traditional contender
- Sea of Galilee with Capernaum (the "city of Jesus"), Tabgha (traditional site of the feeding of the 5000 and the miraculous catch of fish), the Mount of Beatitudes overlooking the lake, Kursi (Gergesa where Jesus exorcised the Gerasene demoniac) and Yardenit Baptismal Site, a baptism site located along the Jordan River, near Kibbutz Kvutzat Kinneret.

== Samaria ==
Samaria was a region inhabited mainly by Samaritans, a nation generally hostile to the Jews, and therefore mostly avoided by them. Today it is part of the West Bank in Palestine, currently occupied by Israel.

- Jacob's Well at "Sychar", a name used in the Gospels either for Shechem (today's Nablus) or a place nearby (John 4:5–6), where Jesus met the Samaritan woman and revealed to her that he was the Messiah (John 4:7–15)

== Syria ==
- The road to Damascus, where Saul of Tarsus, the persecutor of Christians, converted and became Paul, the apostle of Christianity
- Damascus: the Umayyad Mosque is built at the site of the ancient Christian cathedral, which allegedly held as a relic the head of John the Baptist
- Mount Hermon is a less accepted contender for being the site of the Transfiguration of Jesus (see Mount Tabor)

== Lebanon ==
Jesus visited the region of Sidon and Tyre, where he preached and exorcised a woman's daughter. St Paul sailed for Rome from Sidon (Acts 27:3, 4).

- Sidon on the Phoenician coast
- Tyre on the Phoenician coast
- Qana, one contender from South Lebanon for Cana in Galilee (for more see there)

== Jordan ==
- Al-Maghtas, the traditional site of the Baptism of Jesus, situated on the West Bank in Jordan, recognised by all major traditional Christian Churches, and extending onto the East Bank at Qasr al-Yahud. It also contains a cave associated with John the Baptist, situated among the ruins of a Byzantine monastery (not to be confused with the "Cave of Saint John the Baptist" from Tzova near Jaruselum).
- Machaerus, the Herodian fortress where John the Baptist was imprisoned and beheaded
- Mount Nebo, traditional site of the death of Moses and where he looked over to the "Promised Land"

== Red Sea and Sinai ==
- The Red Sea, where Moses parted the sea in order to escape slavery
- Saint Catherine's Monastery in the Sinai, near Mount Sinai and associated with the burning bush (Exodus)

== See also ==
- Christianity in Israel
- Four Holy Cities
