= Greek Orthodox Church of the Annunciation =

Eastern Orthodox church in Nazareth

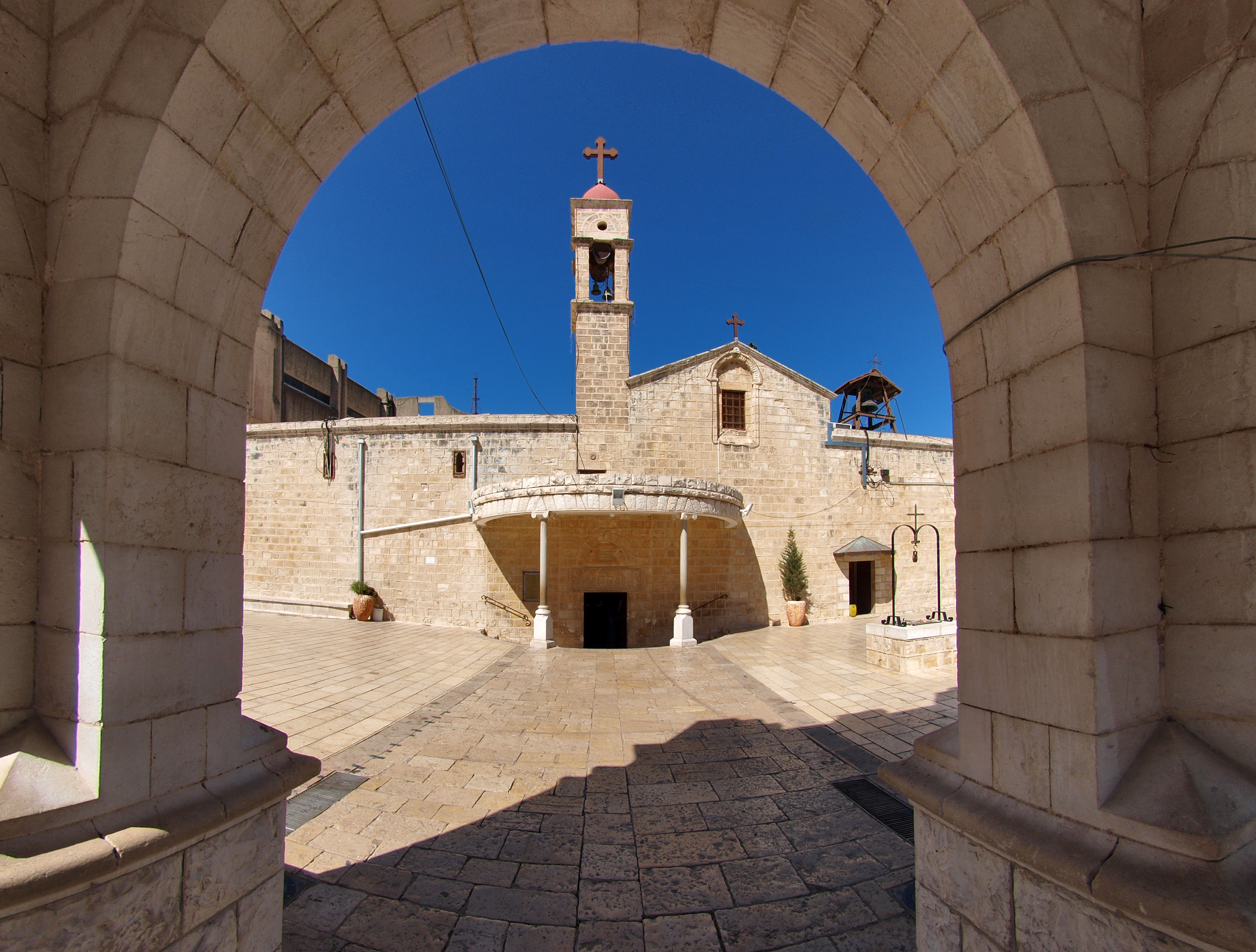

Religion
- Affiliation: Eastern Orthodox

Location
- Location: Nazareth, Israel
- Interactive map of Greek Orthodox Church of the Annunciation
- Coordinates: 32°42′25.5″N 35°18′5.7″E

Architecture
- Completed: 1769
- Direction of façade: South

The Greek Orthodox Church of St. Gabriel (Arabic: كنيسة البشارة للروم الأرثوذكس), also known as the (Greek) Orthodox Church of the Annunciation (Greek: Ορθόδοξος Ναός του Ευαγγελισμού), is an Eastern Orthodox church in Nazareth, Israel. It is one of two claimants to the site of the Annunciation—where angel Gabriel appeared to the Virgin Mary and announced that she would give birth to Jesus—the other being the Catholic Basilica of the Annunciation.

Likely first established in Byzantine-era Palaestina Prima, it was rebuilt during the time of the Crusades, and in its current shape in the 18th century under the rule of Daher al-Umar, the Arab governor of the Galilee.

Known colloquially among the Greek Orthodox worshippers of Galilee whom it serves as Kniset el-Rûm^{[i]}, or Church of the Romans in the sense of Eastern Romans or Byzantines in Levantine Arabic, the church is located over an underground "spring" (actually the outlet of a 17-metre conduit coming from an uphill spring), which according to Eastern Orthodox belief is where the Virgin Mary was drawing water at the time of the Annunciation. Water from the spring still runs inside a side chapel of the church and also fed the adjacent site of Mary's Well, located 150 yards (140 m) away.

== Biblical and apocryphal tradition ==
In Christian tradition, the event by which Mary was informed by the angel Gabriel of God's intention to make her the mother of Jesus is known as the Annunciation. In the New Testament of the Bible, in the Book of Luke (Luke 1:27–35), it is written that Gabriel was sent by God to Nazareth,

to a virgin betrothed to a man whose name was Joseph, of the house of David; and the virgin's name was Mary. And he came to her and said, "Hail, O favoured one, the Lord is with you!": But she was greatly troubled at the saying, and considered in her mind what sort of greeting this might be. And the angel said to her, "Do not be afraid, Mary, for you have found favor with God. And behold, you will conceive in your womb and bear a son, and you shall call his name Jesus.
He will be great, and be called the Son of the Most High;
and the Lord God will give to him the throne of his father David,
And he will reign over the house of Jacob forever;
And of his kingdom there will be no end."
And Mary said to the angel, "How shall this be, since I have no husband?" And the angel said to her,
"The Holy Spirit will come upon you,
and the power of the Most High will overshadow you;
therefore the child to be born will be called holy,
the Son of God."

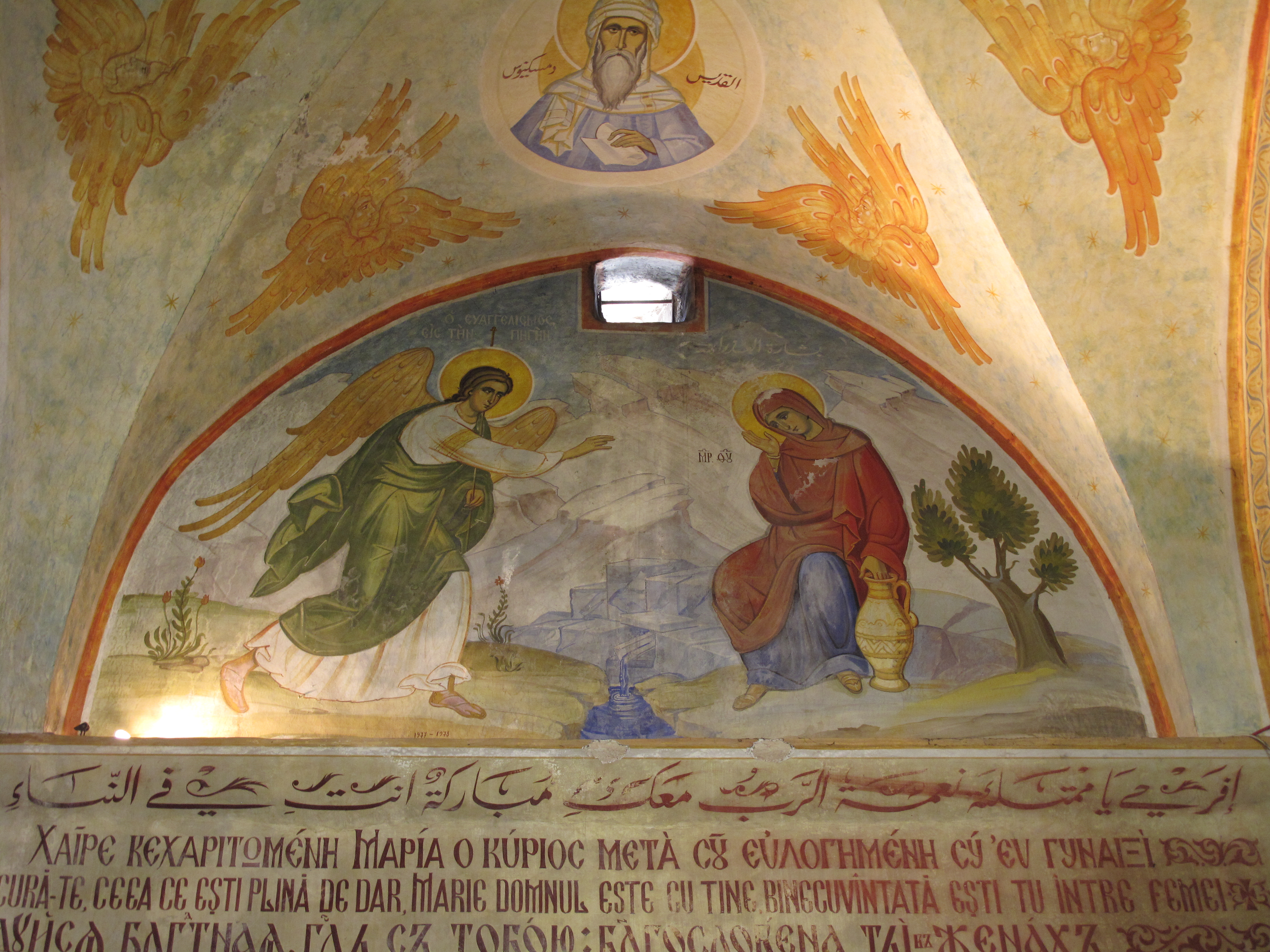
Multilingual (Arabic, Greek, Latin, etc) mural over the door exiting the church quoting the passage from the Protoevangelium of James and depicting Mary's encounter with the angel Gabriel

While it mentions the town of Nazareth, the Book of Luke omits mention of details that might help to identify the precise location of this event therein. However, the Protoevangelium of James, a 2nd-century apocryphal text, states that, "She took the jar and went out to fetch water. Then a voice spoke to her: 'Greetings, you who have received grace. The Lord is with you, you blessed among women.'" The text continues to state that having looked around and seen no one, Mary returned home, placed the jar of water aside, and began to spin, whereupon the angel appeared before her to continue to inform of her appointed role.

There are 18 churches of the Annunciation in Nazareth. The Catholic Basilica of the Annunciation is located over the cave that is believed to have been Mary's home. The Greek Orthodox Church of the Annunciation is located over the spring where it is believed that Mary first heard the angel Gabriel's voice. This spring, which is mentioned in the writings of pilgrims to Nazareth over the centuries, is also thought to be where the six-year-old Jesus was sent by his mother to fetch water, as is recorded in the non-canonical Infancy Gospel of Thomas.

== The spring ==
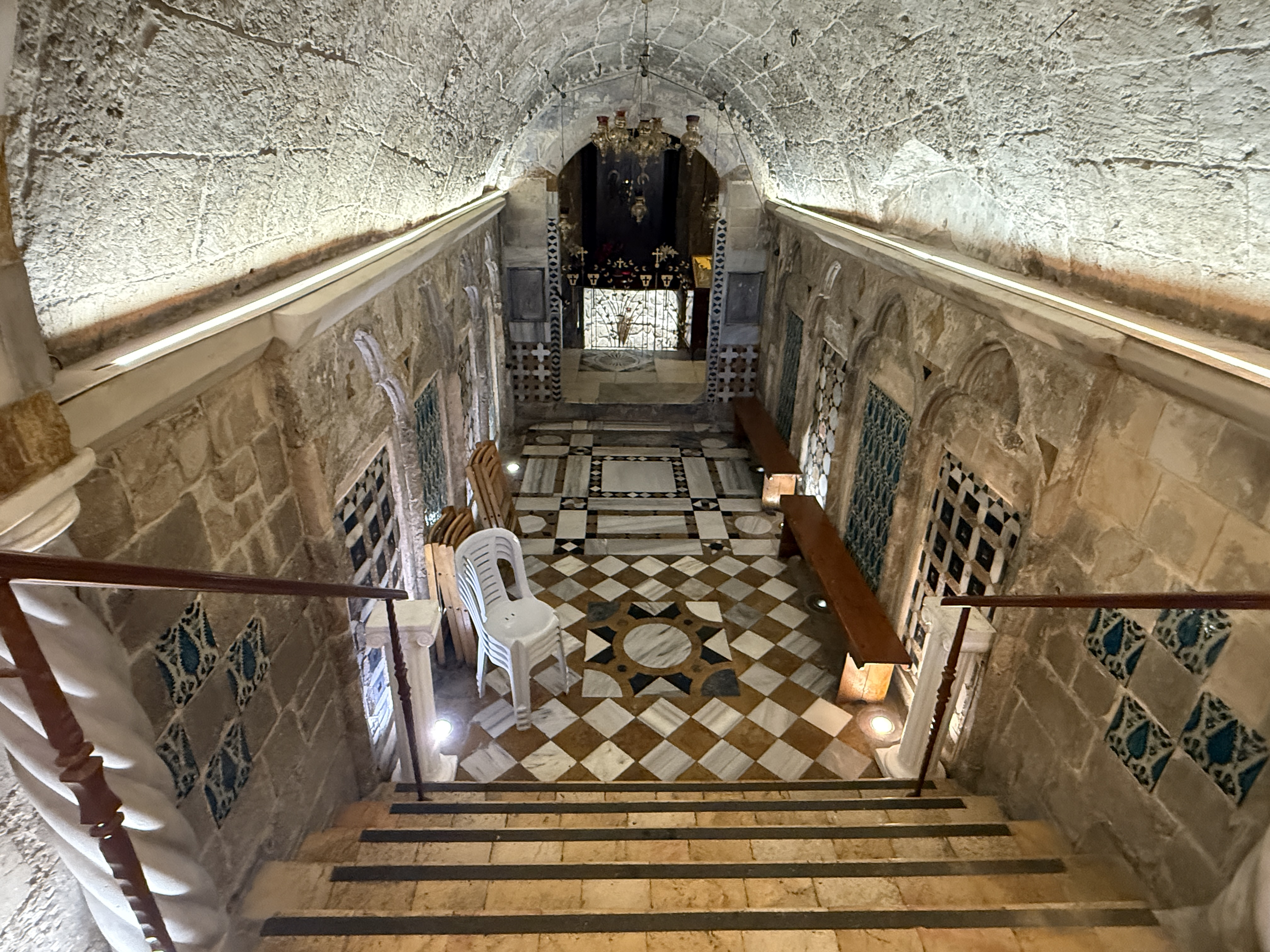
The underground spring chapel, looking toward the spring at the end

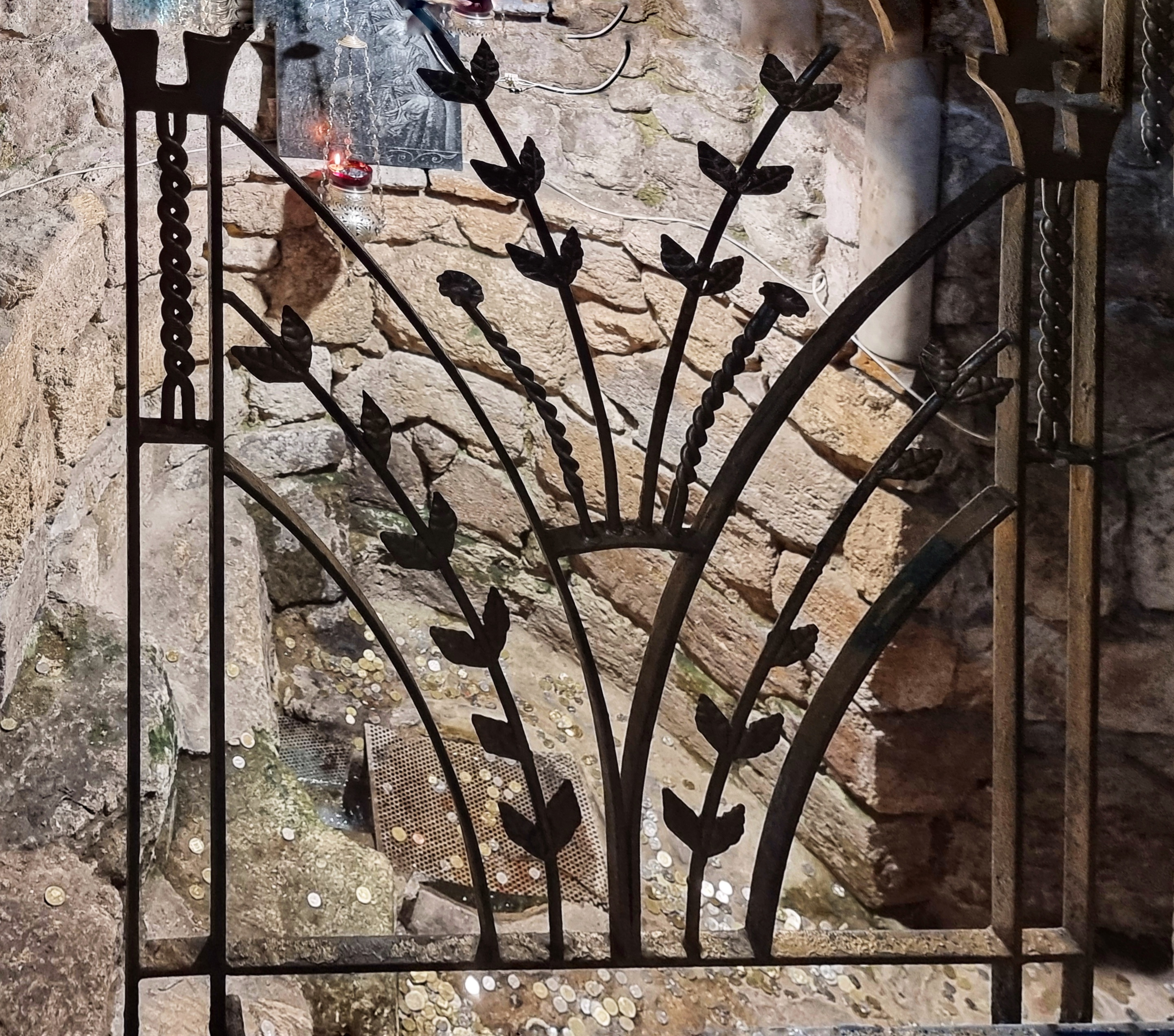
The spring at the end of the underground chapel

The first church was built, probably in the 4th century, at the site of a spring that was the village of Nazareth's only water supply. Such natural sources of water were a vital part of every village, and the spring in Nazareth served as its local watering hole for approximately three thousand years.

The waters of the spring issue from a mountain known as Jabal as-Sikh and flow through an underground channel in the rock for 17 meters (56 ft) before emerging in the church. As recently as the 1990s, they continued on underground from there for another 130 meters to emerge in the public fountain known as Mary's Well. Today's Mary's Well is a non-functioning reconstruction of the original that was built for Nazareth's Millennium celebrations in 2000.

== History ==
=== Late Roman and Byzantine periods ===
A first church might have been built in the Late Roman period during the rule of Constantine I, at the only spring that provided the village with water.

=== Early Muslim period ===
A church located above a spring in Nazareth is mentioned in the writings of Arculf, a monk from Gaul, in 670.

=== Crusader period ===
Abbot Daniel, the Russian Orthodox Christian priest who travelled in the Holy Land, describes a church located at this site between 1106 and 1108 as follows:

"Then we left this town and went a little way to the north east where we found a wonderful well which was deep and very cold, and to reach the water you must go deep down on a stairway. And above this well there is a church dedicated to the Archangel Gabriel, and it is round."

John Phocas, a Greek monk, writes after his 1185 pilgrimage that in approaching Nazareth from the direction of Saffuriyya,

"As soon as you enter the first gate of this large village, you will find a church of the Archangel Gabriel, and there is to be seen a little grotto on the left side of the altar in this church, in which a fountain wells up, pouring forth a transparent stream."

The Greek Orthodox Council stated in a 1989 publication that the church was reconstructed by the Greek Orthodox community over the ruins of the first church between 1109 and 1113, and it remained in use until 1263, at which point it was destroyed by the army of the Mamluk sultan Baibars.

=== Mamluk period ===
Burchard of Mount Sion, the German Dominican who travelled extensively in the Middle East, also describes the spring inside the church during his visit to Nazareth in 1283, two decades after Nazareth's conquest by the Mamluk sultan Baybars. He notes that it is venerated by the local people, it is from this spring that, "it is said that the Boy Jesus ... often used to draw water."

In the 14th century writings of the Western traveller, James of Verona, the church is mentioned as being "two bow-shots away" from the (Catholic) Church of the Annunciation. James writes, "This was a decorous and beautiful chapel, but now is partly destroyed," and tells of drinking from the water of "a small clear spring" lying adjacent to the structure, which is said to be the same as that from which the Virgin Mary and Boy Jesus drank. Another account from this century by the Franciscan friar Nicolas of Poggibonsi (c. 1346–50) describes a fine church of St. Gabriel as being held by "Indians of Persia, who are called Alaphisi". Denys Pringle explains that he may have meant Nestorians or Ethiopians, since he refers to these communities in other writings as Indiani.

=== Ottoman period ===
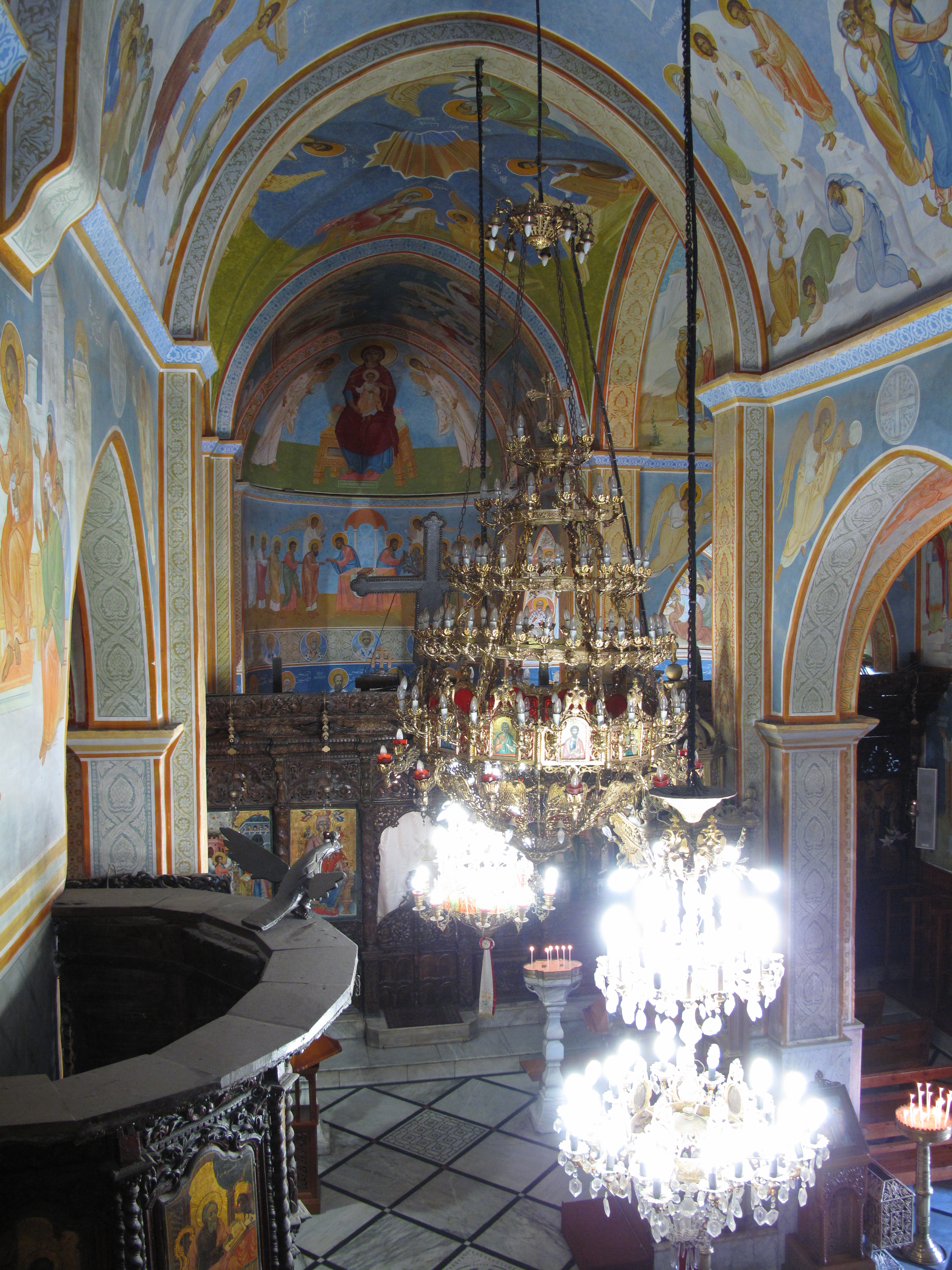
Part of the interior of the 18th-century church

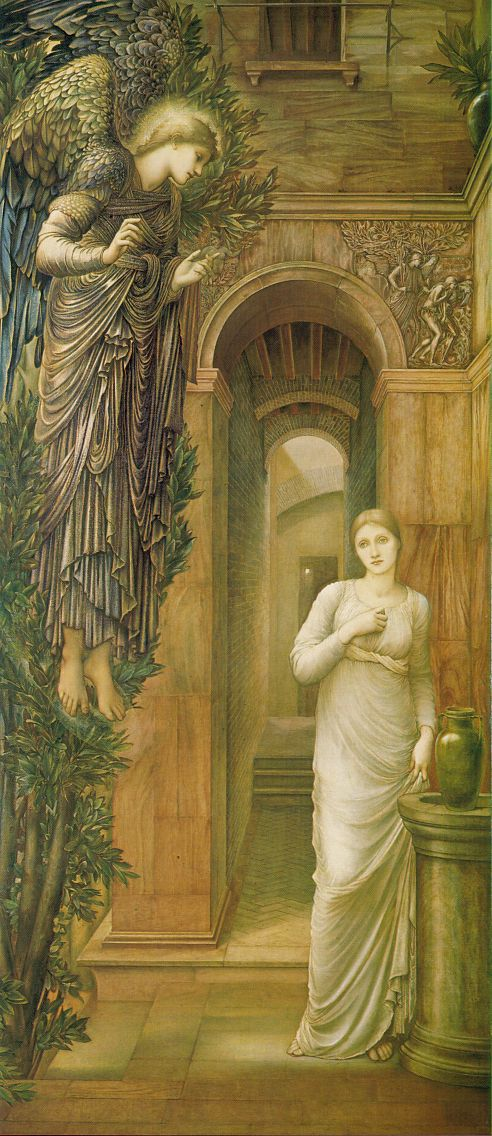
The Annunciation at the well, Edward Burne-Jones, oil on canvas (1879)

Accounts from the 16th century are contradictory. On the one hand, Boniface of Ragusa, an Italian priest who was in the region between 1551 and 1564, refers to people of "other nations" praying at the church. On the other hand, an account from 1563 by Luigi Vulcano della Padula describes the church as being in ruins, with only a small cave remaining as a memorial. At the end of the 16th century, Jan Kootwyk describes, "the ruins of an arched construction, of a certain sanctuary of the oriental Christians dedicated (it is said) to the Archangel Gabriel." Kootwyk also says that this structure was built on the foundations of the "House of Joseph".

An early-17th-century account by Quaresmi, the Italian writer and Orientalist, indicates that the church was not visible above ground, but that the top of the vault of a subterranean chamber that had remained intact was at ground level. In 1626, he descended into this chamber which he described as follows:

"Its length is 24 palms [4.8 m], its width 14 [2.8 m] and its height or projection about 15 [3 m]. In the middle of it, to the east, is an altar for celebrating Mass. There are many pictures in it, but they are well-nigh destroyed by dampness, age, and the ill will of infidels. In the farthest part of the chapel is the mouth of a spring, from which its water are said to flow forth. And there is a stair, and at one time, a door by which one used to ascend to a convent of nuns, which, so as the tradition goes, used to be above it in times gone by [...] From time to time the Greeks hold services in it."

Between 1628 and 1631, a small chapel was built by the Franciscans, who allowed the growing Orthodox community, upon its request, to use it.

During the rule of Daher al-Umar (1730–1775) over the Galilee, the local Greek Orthodox community obtained a firman granting them control over the site and church (Franciscan chapel), which had been occupied previously by the Franciscans and the Greek Catholic church. Al-Umar granted this control to the local Arab Christian community, rather than the Greek Orthodox Patriarchate of Jerusalem. In 1750, they built a new church to the south side of the subterranean chamber, adding a wooden iconostasis (a screen decorated with icons) in 1767. The church continues to be run by the Arab Orthodox local council in Nazareth today.

== Description ==
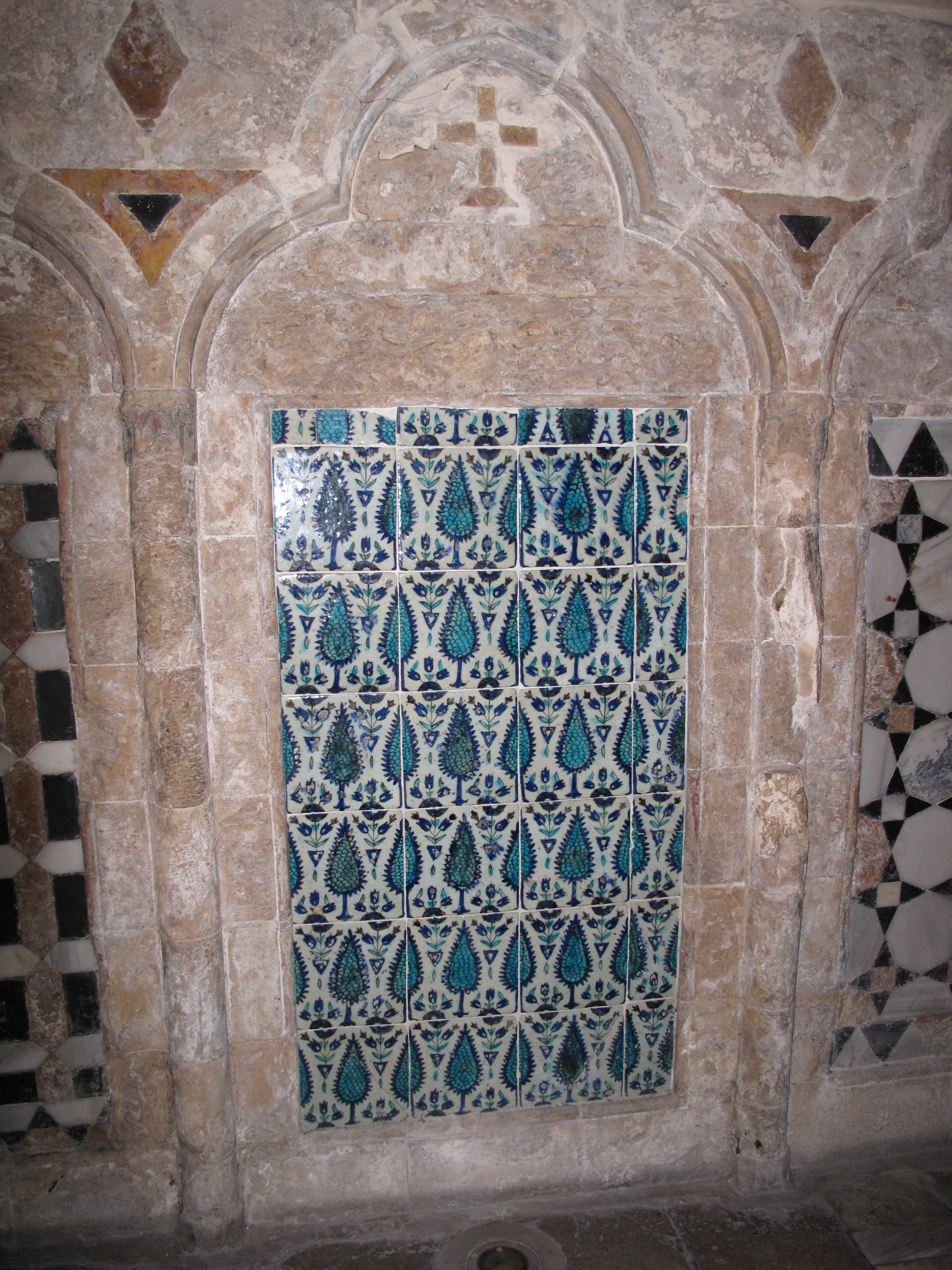
Some of the Armenian tilework on the walls of the underground spring chapel

The church is located approximately 650 meters (2,130 ft) from the Basilica of the Annunciation and 130 meters (430 ft) from Mary's Well, which sits alongside the road leading to Saffuriyya.

=== Underground spring chapel ===
The underground chapel from the medieval era containing the spring is accessed from within the present church by descending seven steps. Measuring 10 meters long, 3.3 meters wide, and 3.5 meters high, at the end of this low vaulted cavern, presumably built by the Crusaders in the 12th century, ancient Armenian tilework decorates the walls leading to a small recess. There, below an altar with a semi-circular apse, a shaft leads down to the spring, and one can lower a metal cup to draw water. On the wall to the east is doorway, whose entryway is blocked, and it thought that this is the stairway to which Quaresmi referred in his writings.

=== Above-ground 18th-century church ===
Modern decorative murals cover the walls and the ceilings of the 18th-century overground church. The iconostasis hides the altar from view, in keeping with Eastern Orthodox tradition. The tomb of the priest who founded the church can be seen along the north wall.

== Gallery ==
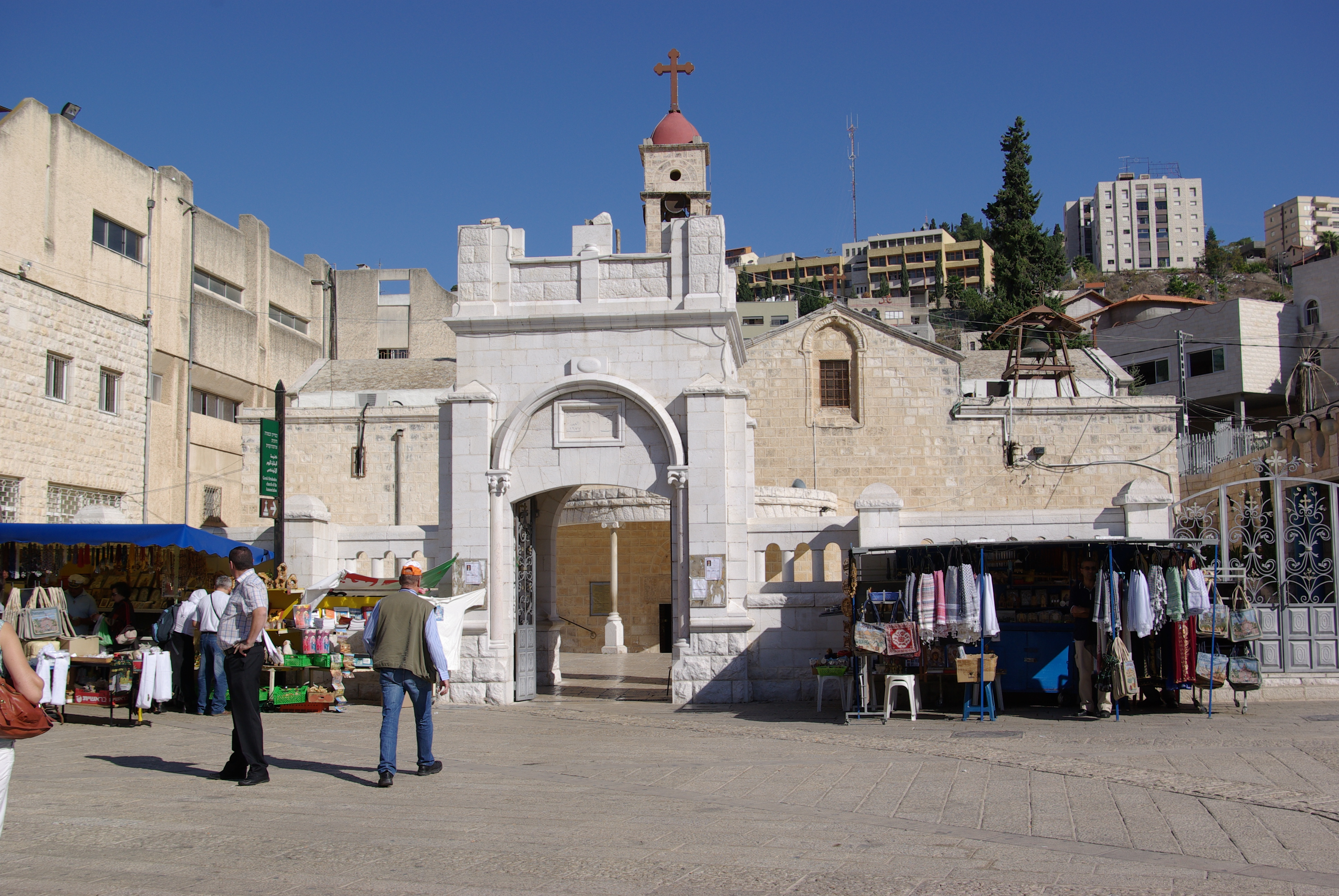

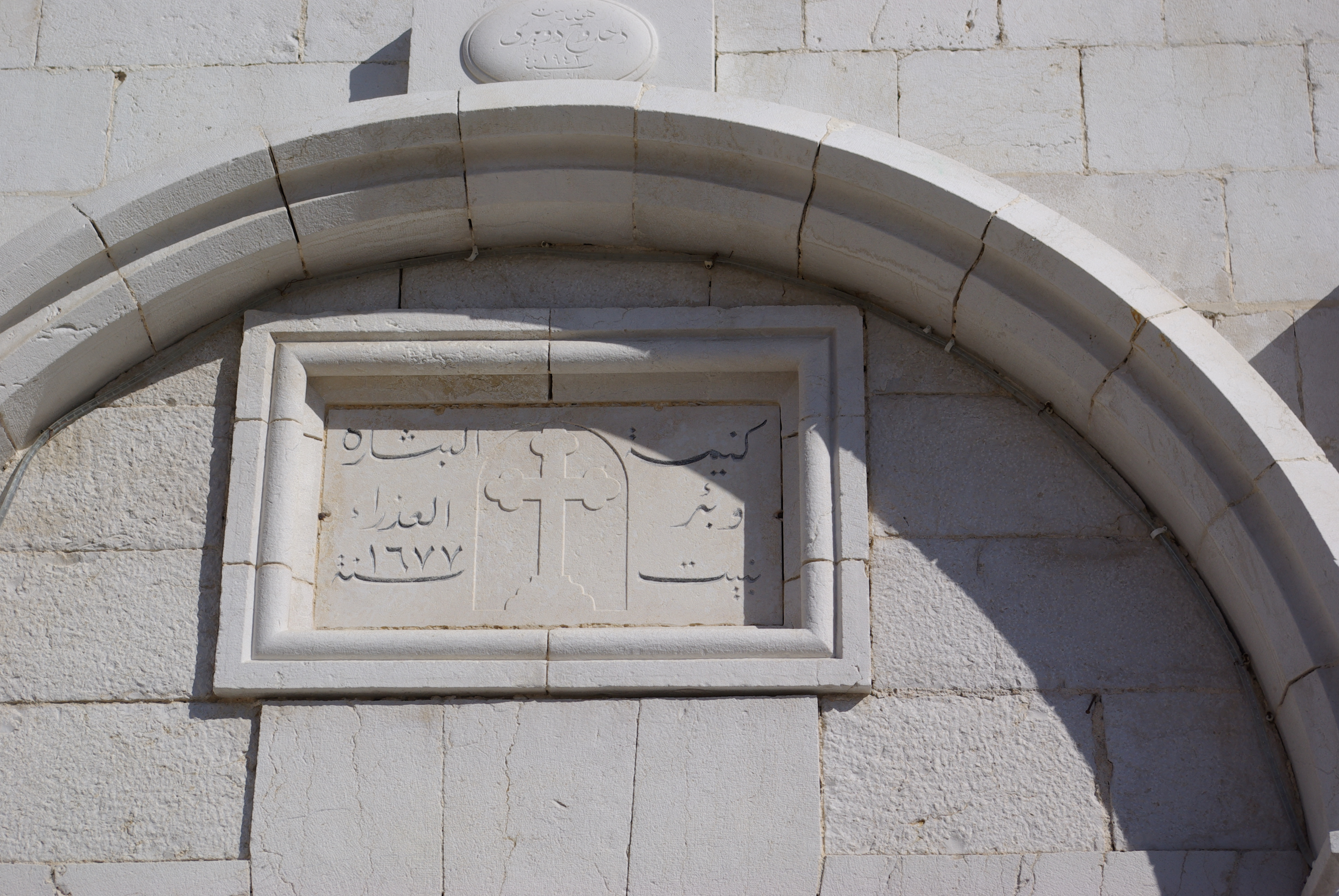

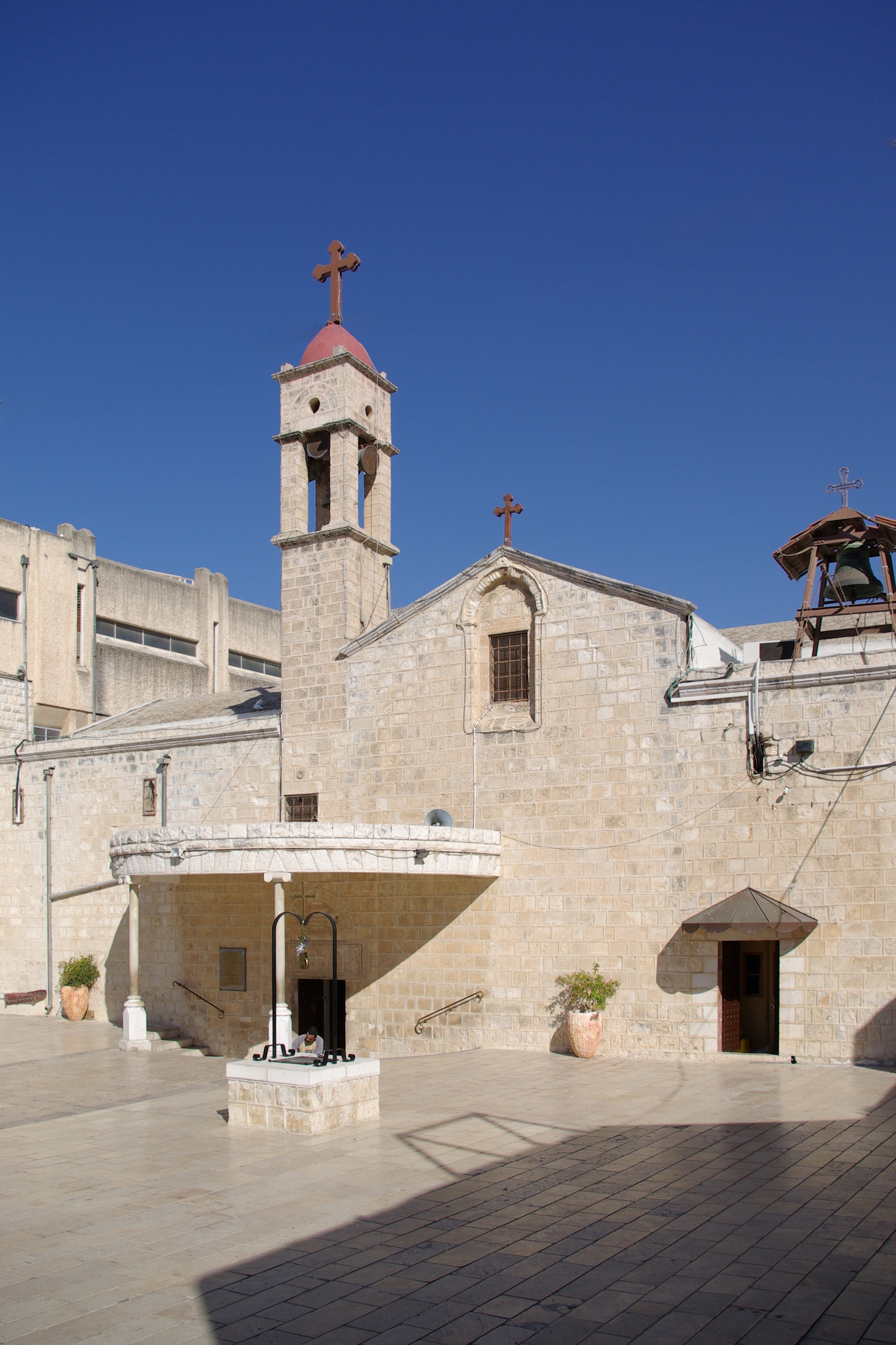

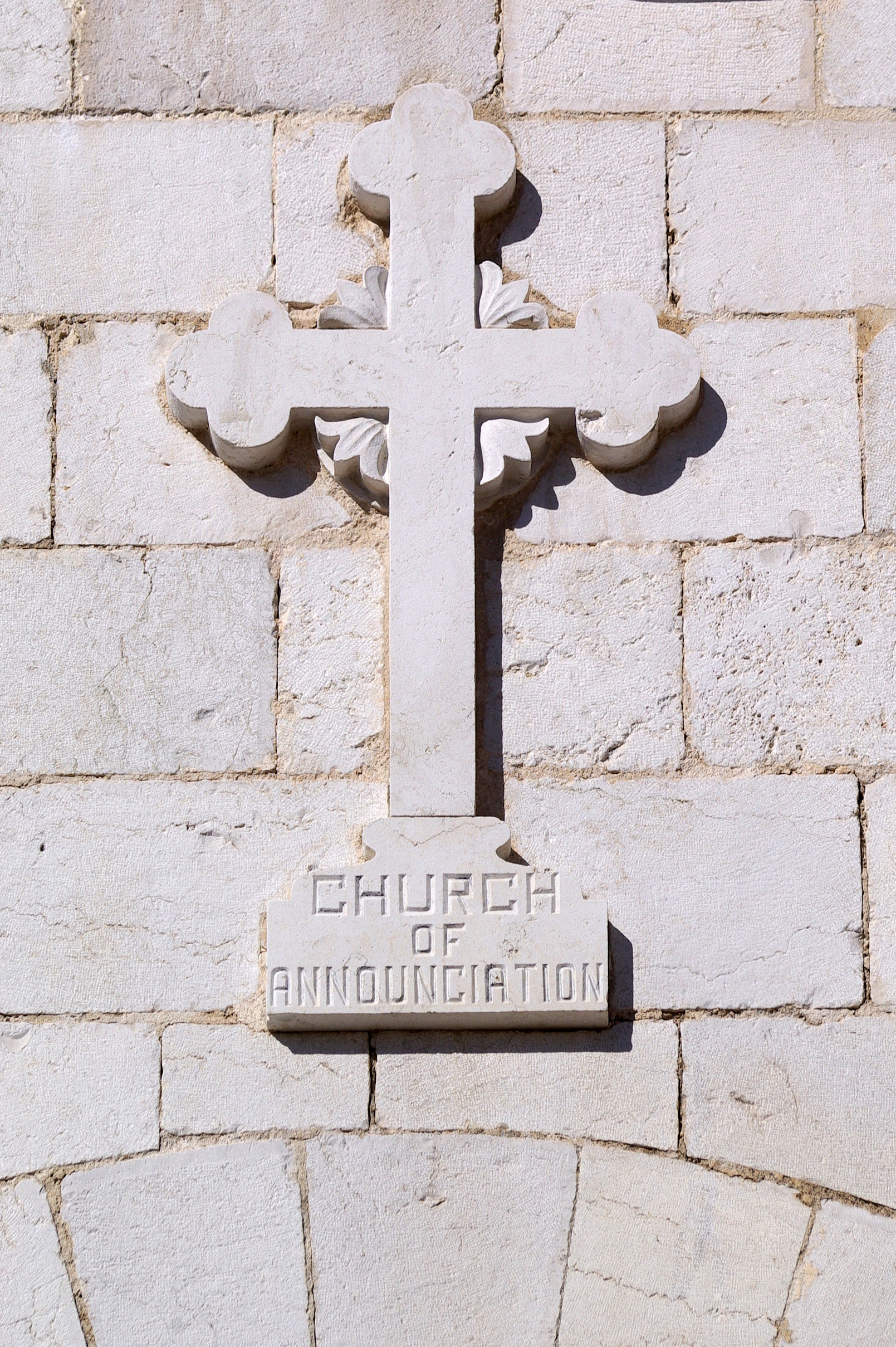

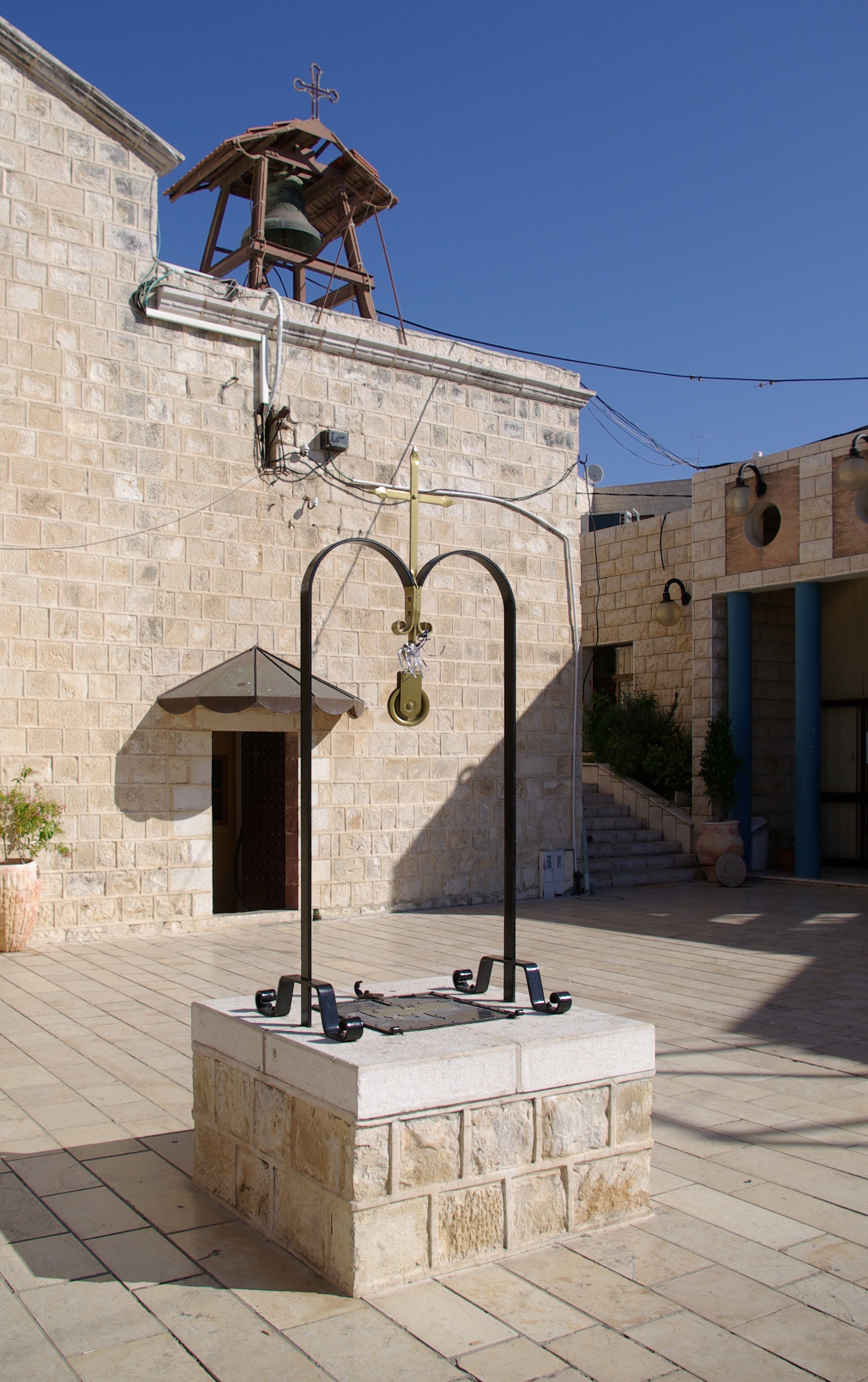

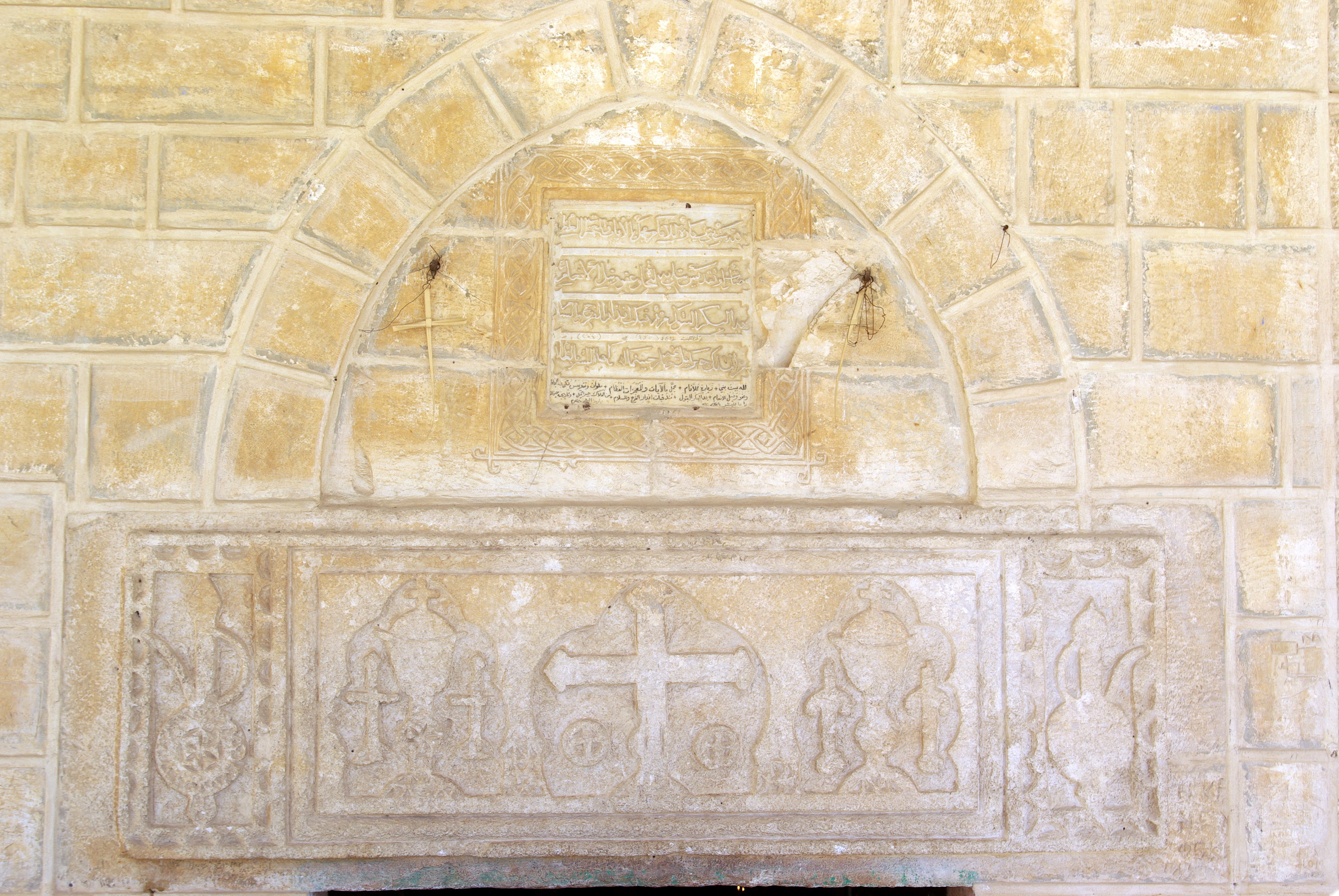

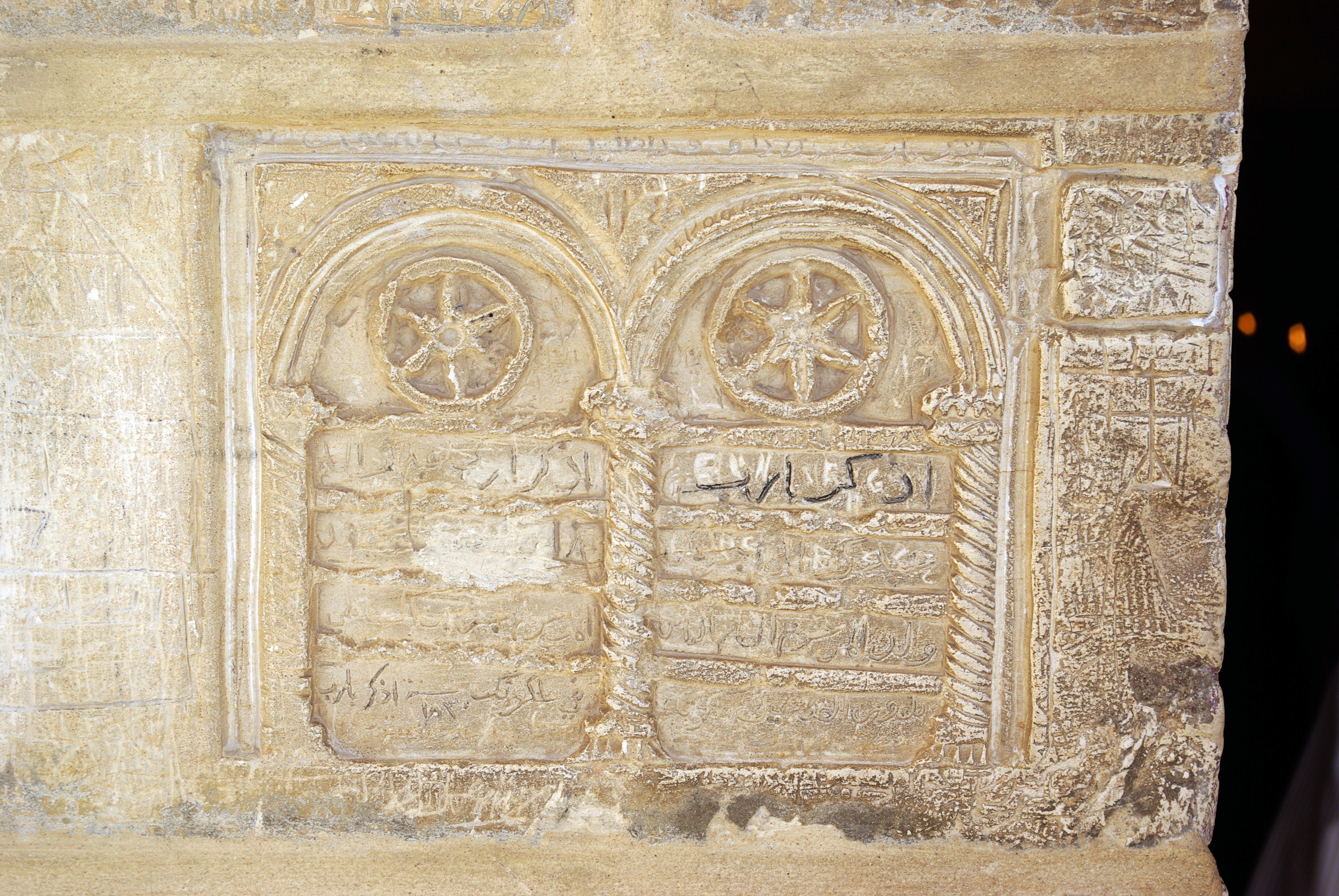

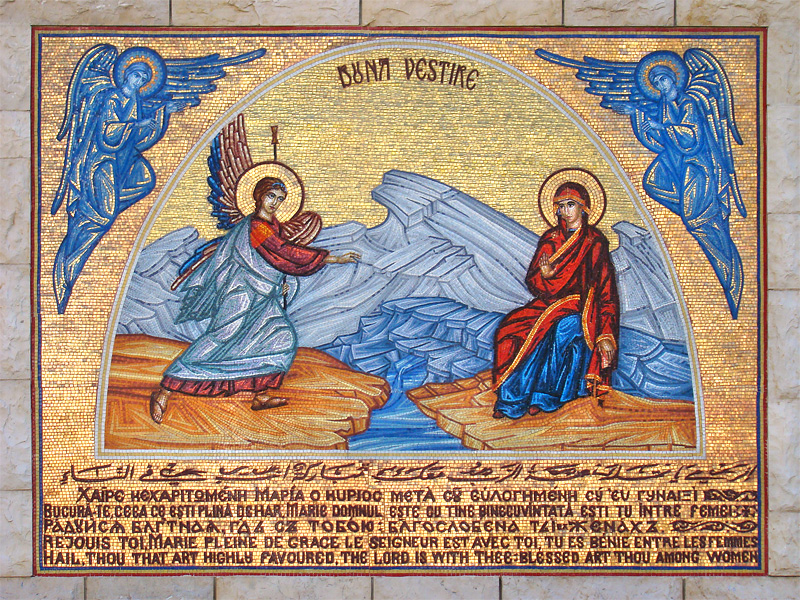

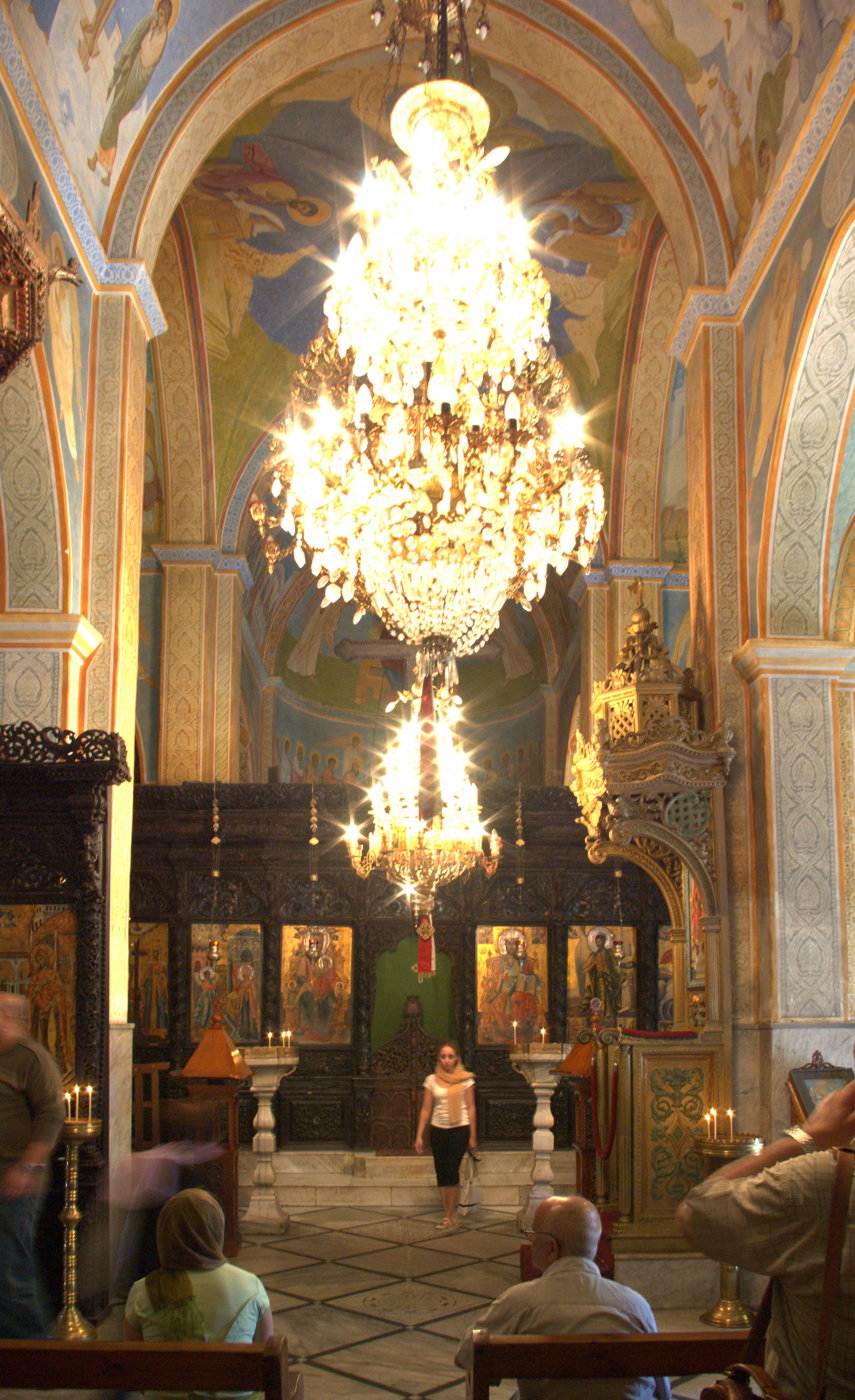

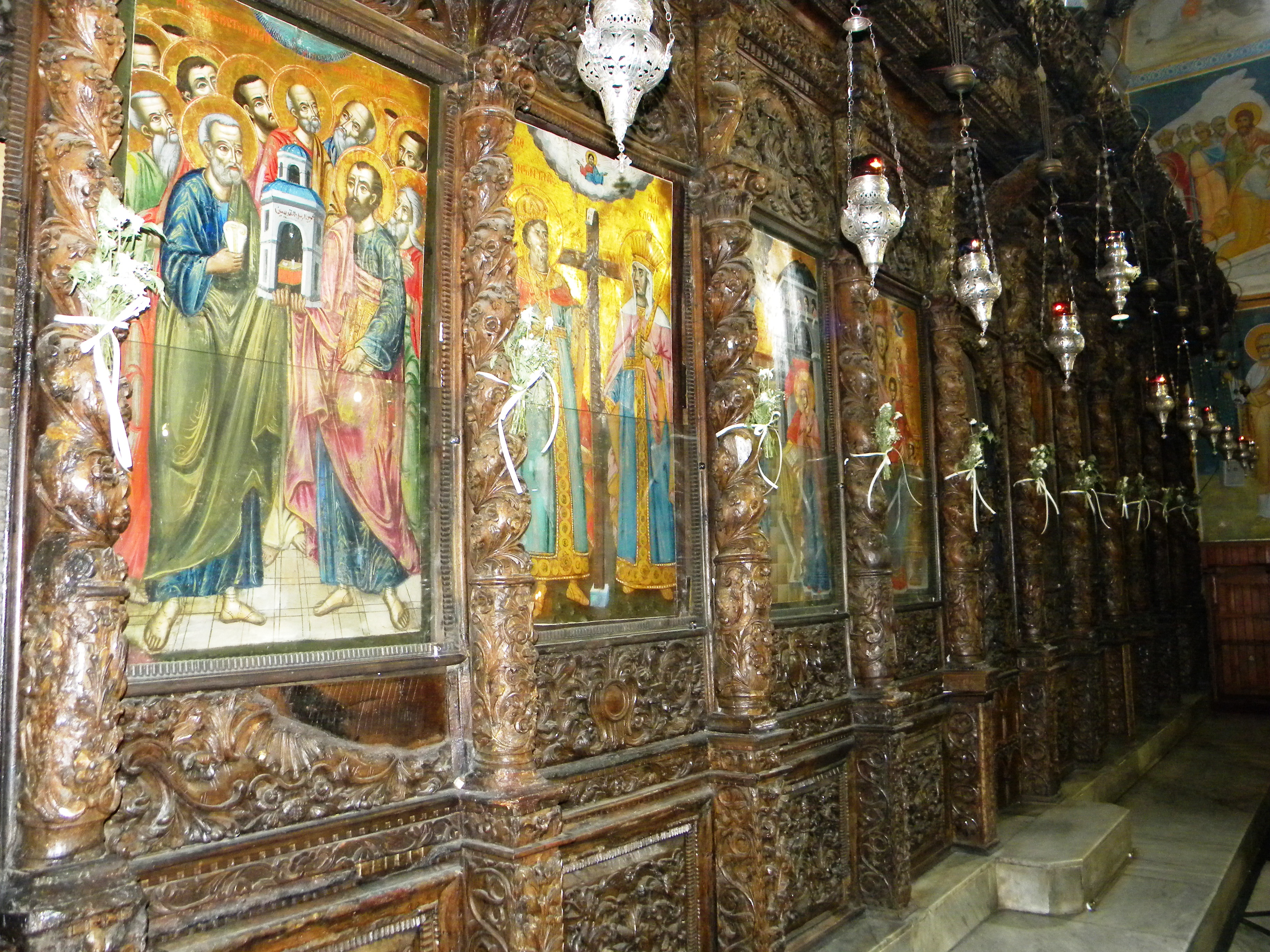

== See also ==
- Armenian ceramics in Jerusalem

== Footnotes ==
- ^iRum is the Arabic word for Romans, Byzantines and adherents of all nationalities of the Eastern Orthodox church.

== Bibliography ==
- Emmett, Chad F. (1995). Beyond the basilica : Christians and Muslims in Nazareth. Chicago: University of Chicago Press. ISBN 0-226-20711-0. OCLC 30735259.
- Slyomovics, Susan (2009). "Edward Said's Nazareth". Framework: The Journal of Cinema and Media. 50 (1/2). [Drake Stutesman, Wayne State University Press]: 9–45. ISSN 0306-7661. JSTOR 41552537.
