= James of Verona =

Augustinian friar and pilgrim

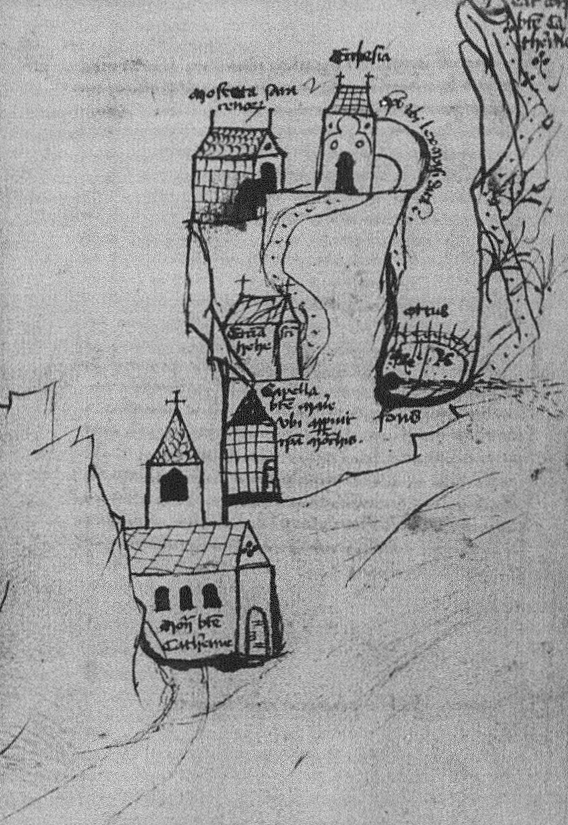
Map of Mount Sinai from the Liber in the manuscript James Ford Bell Library, MS 1424/Co.

James of Verona was an Augustinian friar who made a pilgrimage to the Holy Land in 1335 and wrote an account of his travels in Latin, the Liber peregrationis ('The Book of the Pilgrimage'). He was probably born in Verona around 1290. He entered the Augustinian order in 1310 or 1311, twenty-five years before his pilgrimage.

== Bibliography ==
- Bartolini, Gabriella (2004). "Jacopo da Verona". Dizionario Biografico degli Italiani (in Italian). Vol. 62: Iacobiti–Labriola. Rome: Institute of the Italian Encyclopaedia. ISBN 978-88-12-00032-6.
- Chareyron, Nicole (2005). Pilgrims to Jerusalem in the Middle Ages. Columbia University Press.
- Di Cesare, Michelina (2012). The Pseudo-historical Image of the Prophet Muhammad in Medieval Latin Literature: A Repertory. De Gruyter.
- Westrem, Scott D. (2001). Broader Horizons: A Study of Johannes Witte de Hese's Itinerarius and Medieval Travel Narratives (PDF). Medieval Academy of America.
