= Greffin Affagart =

French knight

Greffin Affagart (born around 1490 or 1495, died around 1557) was a French nobleman, seigneur de Courteilles du Bois (or de Nocé) in Maine, author of a pilgrim's story in the Holy Land.

== Biography ==
Greffin Affagart travelled to Holy Land twice and recounted his impressions in a manuscript called Relation de la Terre Sainte (1533/1534).

Starting from Chartres, Greffin Affagart crossed France and Italy from the north to reach Venice, in search of a maritime passage to the Holy Land. Fourteen years later, in 1533, he left Marseille for a similar pilgrimage which would take him along the Italian then Greek coasts, passing near Crete, to Rhodes and Cyprus, then Alexandria before reaching Jaffa.

Affagart’s main goal was to write a guide for the pilgrim in the Holy Land. He wanted to prevent Christians from giving up too easily when undertaking the journey to the Holy Land, and to show them that, despite the great difficulties, the pilgrimage was feasible. His account is condensed in a small simple and precise treatise with information on the diversity of the countries, languages, currencies, the dangers by sea and by land, the way of living of different "sects" of Christians, the distances between places, that might be useful to a traveller.

== Extracts ==
"After having disposed of our consciences and our goods with the blessing of God, on the first day of March, we left the city of Chartres in the company of a nobleman and virtuous personage, the Lord of the River, to go straight to Paris, where instead we dressed in the way of hermit s in order to make our journey more simply and religiously. For whoever wants to do it must be in simple and concealed clothing, even if in great condition, and mainly to go to Mount Sinai, for those who prove themselves to be richer are in greater danger and are more molested, and Christians on the sea and Turks in their countries..."

"All the pilgrims assembled in Venice, around Pentecost, as is customary, we addressed a supplication to the Lordship to deliver us a ship to make our voyage, which thing was granted to us, in spite of the doubts and fears caused by the capture of four of their galleys by the Barbary Moors and because, lacking in wheat in the country, the Lordship had ordered all ships to load wheat in Barbary. Nonetheless, we were given a choice, and eventually the pilgrims agreed to take "the Dauphine". The boss's name was Janot, a rather inhuman man ..."

"At that time there were few pilgrims and, for this reason, we could not agree with the boss, especially since there were few people in authority. Monsignor the Bishop of Cambrai was there, but he returned from Venice. He wanted to go there a great multitude of character of state, like bishops, abbots, dukes, counts, barons and other personages of cloth, which defray the ship, and thus the small ones passed more cheaply and more easily, but since that this wicked bawdy of Luther reigned with his accomplices and also Erasmus, who, in his Colloquies and Enchiridion blamed the trips, several Christians withdrew and cooled off, and mainly the Flemings and Germans who wanted to be the most devout to travel than all the others."

"But now there are only poor people and few in number, and the less, the more it costs everyone. And you have to pay the captain well and pay the ship as if it were full, or else the merchant wouldn't save his wages. Because of this, for several years already, the voyage was interrupted and there was no determined ship to carry the pilgrims together, but each one sought his good match where he could, one in a ship, the others into another; some to Candia (Crete), others to Cyprus, and others to Syria, Beirut or Tripoli; and if the princes and other Christian lords do not return to their original devotion, the journey is in danger of being lost."
