= Niccolò da Poggibonsi =

Niccolò da Poggibonsi (Latin: Nicolaus de Podiobonito) was a Franciscan friar of the 14th century who made a famous pilgrimage to the Holy Land in 1345–1350, which he described in Italian in his Libro d'oltramare.

From Poggibonsi in Tuscany, Niccolò, with seven companions (six of whom eventually returned home), departed for Venice, from where they embarked for a sea voyage to Cyprus. He sojourned for some months on the island in the service of King Hugh IV. He then left for Jaffa, and from there visited the shrines in Jerusalem (where he served for four months in the Church of the Holy Sepulchre) and the myriad holy sites of Palestine. He went as far as Damascus intending to visit "Babylonia" and "Chaldaea" (probably Baghdad), which he never did.

Niccolò then left by ship from Beirut and stopped in Egypt, where he visited Alexandria, "Babylonia" (probably Fustat, Old Cairo), New Cairo, and the places in the Sinai mentioned in the Old Testament. There he also visited the ancient Saint Catherine's Monastery. He continued north to Gaza and there turned back towards the Nile Delta, where he took a ship from Damietta back to Cyprus.

In Cyprus Niccolò boarded a ship for Italy. The ship followed an adventurous course, taking him by the Anatolian coast of the Ottoman Empire, to call in the port of Tripoli, and near Poreč on the Adriatic, where he was captured by brigands but managed to escape. He arrived safely in Venice late in 1349 and went to Ferrara, where he was detained until the spring of 1350, when he finally, after five years of wandering, returned to Poggibonsi.

Upon his return, Niccolò recounted his travels in the Libro d'oltramare ("Book of Outremer"). Rich in detail, it describes the sights, the distances on the roads, the tolls paid, and the indulgences associated with various shrines. His descriptions of buildings and cities are unusually detailed, and the picture he paints of Jerusalem was based on four months residence there. His entire pilgrimage was extraordinarily long by the standards of the time. This is probably attributable to his desire to see sites that lacked the facilities for receiving pilgrims, for visiting far-off sites in Egypt, Syria, and Iraq, and his financial difficulties (his first stay in Cyprus necessitated by the need to raise cash). Organised trips departed regularly from Venice, bringing pilgrims to Jerusalem and its suburbs (like Mount Tabor), but Niccolò eschewed typical tourism.

Niccolò informs us that the house of the Virgin Mary at Nazareth, long a Christian holy place, was destroyed, possibly by the Mamelukes sometime after 1289, when it was last recorded standing. When Niccolò visited the site, all that remained was a cove with three walls. Niccolò is also an important witness to a supposed Mongol conquest of Jerusalem in 1300, since he records that the Mongols removed a gate (the "Golden Gate") from the Temple of Jerusalem (today the Dome of the Rock) and had it transferred to Damascus.

The Libro d'oltramare was translated into German around 1467 by Gabriel Muffel of Nuremberg, who was probably working out of Passau. An illuminated manuscript (Egerton 1900) of the German translation from 1467, purports to be a description of Muffel's visit to the Holy Land in 1465. The earliest manuscripts of Niccolò's Libro are unillustrated, but the Egerton 1900 has 147 miniatures. The Libro d'oltramare was first published anonymously in an Italian translation based on the German in Bologna in 1500. This version, the Viazo da Venesia al Sancto Iherusalem, contained 145 woodcuts and twenty-six printings before 1600.

Nothing is known regarding the rest of his life.

== Editions of the Libro d'oltramare ==
- Viazo da Venesia al Sancto Iherusalem, Armando and Franca Petrucci, edd. Rome: Edizioni dell'Elefante, c.1972. Republication of Libro d'oltramare (Bologna: Iustiniano da Rubeira, 1500).
- Viaggio da Venezia a Gerusalem: testo inedito del secolo 14, Francesco Zambrini, ed. Bologna: Tip. d'Ignazio Galeati e figlio, 1872.
- Damasco e le sue adiacenze nel secolo XIV: Dal Viaggio in Terra Santa di Fr. Niccolò da Poggibonsi, Francesco Zambrini, ed. Imola: 1878.
- Libro d'oltramare, Bologna: Alberto Bacchi della Lega, 1881. Scelta di curiosità letterarie, 182–183; facs. ed. Bologna: Commissione per i testi di lingua, 1968.
- Libro d'oltramare, 1346–1350. Alberto Bacchi Della Lega, ed., updated and annotated by B. Bagatti. Studium Biblicum Franciscanum, Collectio maior, 2. Jerusalem: Tipografia dei PP. Francescani, 1945.
- A voyage beyond the seas, 1346–1350, T. Bellorini and E. Hoade, edd.
- Del luogo dove Cristo nacque, di Fra Niccolo Corbizi da Poggibonsi. Pisa: Cursi, 1971.
- The German translation of Niccolò da Poggibonsi's Libro d'oltramare, Clive D. M. Cossar, ed. Göppingen: Kümmerle, 1985.
