= Travelogues of Palestine =

Descriptions of the region of Palestine by travellers

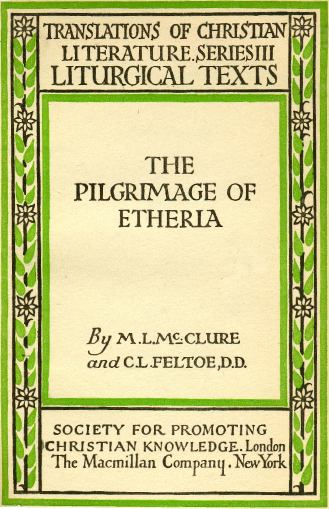
Itinerarium Egeriae

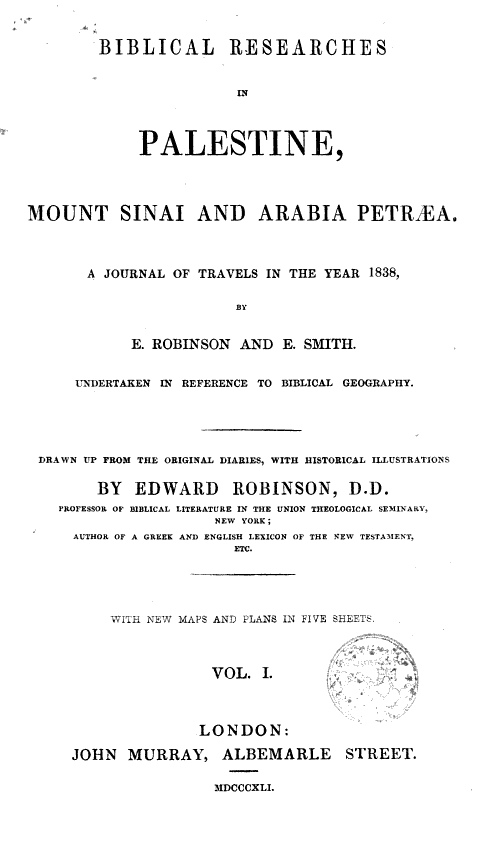
Biblical Researches in Palestine

Two notable examples of Travelogues of Palestine, almost 1,500 years apart.

Travelogues of Palestine are the written descriptions of the region of Palestine by travellers, particularly prior to the 20th century. The works are important sources in the study of the history of Palestine and of Israel.

Surveys of the geographical literature on Palestine were published by Edward Robinson in 1841, Titus Tobler in 1867 and subsequently by Reinhold Röhricht in 1890. Röhricht catalogued 177 works between 333 and 1300 CE, 19 works in the 14th century, 279 works in the 15th century, 333 works in the 16th century, 390 works in the 17th century, 318 works in the 18th century and 1,915 works in the 19th century. Important early works include the early Christian pilgrim accounts Itinerarium Burdigalense, Itinerarium Egeriae and Itinerarium Placentinum. Notable Islamic works include the 11th century Safarnama of Nasir Khusraw, the 14th century Travels of Ibn Battuta, and the 17th century Seyahatnâme by Evliya Çelebi. Notable Jewish works include the itineraries of Benjamin of Tudela and Petachiah of Regensburg.

The number of published travelogues proliferated during the 19th century, and these travelers' impressions of 19th-century Palestine have been often quoted in the history and historiography of the region, although their accuracy and impartiality has been called into question in modern times. In total, there are more than 3,000 books and other materials detailing accounts of the journeys of primarily European and North American travelers to Ottoman Palestine. Notable 19th century works include Biblical Researches in Palestine by Edward Robinson, The Land and the Book by William McClure Thomson, and The Historical Geography of the Holy Land by George Adam Smith.

== List of pre-20th century travelogues ==
The below list is ordered chronologically by years of travel, also indicating first publication, and/or edition available online. The list currently includes less than 200 works, out of an estimated 3,500 known works published prior to the 20th century. Bold titles have an existing Wikipedia article.

Date	Author	Title (with link)	Language	Editions
333	Anonymous	Itinerarium Burdigalense	Latin	
380s	Egeria	Itinerarium Egeriae	Latin	
414–449	Eucherius of Lyon	Letter to Faustus	Latin	
c. 500	Anonymous	Breviary of Jerusalem	Latin	
518–530	Theodosius	De Situ Terrae Sanctae	Latin	
c. 530	Hierocles	Synecdemus	Greek	
570s	Anonymous	Itinerarium Placentinum	Latin	
698	Arculf (with Adomnán)	De Locis Sanctis	Latin	Wright, Thomas (1848). Text. Henry G. Bohn.
778	Willibald (with Hygeburg)	Hodoeporicon	Latin	Vita Willibaldi Episcopi Eichstetensis, Hannover, 1887. "Appendix III. Tobler's Résumé of Works on Palestine". Text. T. & T. Clark. 1866. pp. 391–409. Wright, Thomas (1848). Text. Henry G. Bohn.
800s	Bernard the Pilgrim	Itinerarium	Latin	Wright, Thomas (1848). Text. Henry G. Bohn.
980s	al-Maqdisi	Description of Syria including Palestine	Arabic	Guy Le Strange, ed. (1886). Text.
1047	Nasir Khusraw	Safarnama	Persian	1986. ISBN 0887060676
1102	Sæwulf	Relatio de situ Ierusalem	Latin	Wright, Thomas (1848). Text. Henry G. Bohn.
1108	Daniel the Traveller	Puteshestvie Igumena Daniila	Russian	
1138	Rorgo Fretellus	Descriptio de Locis Sanctis	Latin	
1147	John Phokas	Ekphrasis	Greek	
1157	Níkulás Bergsson	Leiðarvísir og borgarskipan	Icelandic	
1160s	John of Würzburg	Description of the Holy Land	Latin	
1170s–1180s	Petachiah of Regensburg	Travels of Rabbi Petachia of Ratisbon	Hebrew	Text (archived)
1172	Theoderich	Libellus de locis sanctis	Latin	
1173	Benjamin of Tudela	Travels (Itinerary)	Hebrew	Wright, Thomas (1848). Text. Henry G. Bohn.
1187?	Ernoul	Chronicle of Ernoul and Bernard the Treasurer	French	Text (in French). Mme Ve J. Renouard. 1871. Text. Vol. 6. Translated by Conder. Palestine Pilgrims' Text Society. 1896.
1192	Anonymous canon from Tønsberg	Historia de Profectione Danorum in Hierosolymam	Latin	
Early 13th century	Uncertain	Fazienda de Ultramar	Old Spanish	Lazar, Moshé; Arbesú, David, eds. (1965). Text.
1210	Menachem ben Peretz of Hebron	Travel Account	Hebrew	
1211–1212	Wilbrand of Oldenburg	Itinerarium Terrae Sanctae	Latin	Text. Ashgate Pub. 2011. ISBN 978-1-4094-3607-2. OCLC 785151012. Text (in German). T. G. Meissner. 1859.
1217–1218	Thietmar	Iter ad Sanctam Terram	Latin	Text. Nolte & Köhler. 1857. Text. Huber. 1851.
1249	Máel Muire Ó Lachtáin	Account lost	Unknown	
1274–1284	Burchard of Mount Sion	Descriptio Terrae Sanctae	Latin	J. C. M. Laurent, ed. (1864). Text (in Latin). J. C. Hinrichs. J. C. M. Laurent, ed. (1873). Text (in Latin) (2 ed.). J. C. Hinrichs. Text. Vol. 12. Translated by Aubrey Stewart. Palestine Pilgrims' Text Society. 1896. Text. Ashgate Pub. 2011. ISBN 978-1-4094-3607-2. OCLC 785151012.
1285–1289	Philip of Savona	Travel Account	Unknown	Text. Ashgate Pub. 2011. ISBN 978-1-4094-3607-2. OCLC 785151012.
1289	Riccoldo da Monte di Croce	Liber Peregrinationis	Latin	Text (in Latin). J. C. Hinrichs. 1864. pp. 102ff. Text. Ashgate Pub. 2011. ISBN 978-1-4094-3607-2. OCLC 785151012.
1320s	Symon Semeonis	Itinerarium Symonis Semeonis ab Hybernia ad Terram Sanctam	Latin	
1357–1371	Unknown	Mandeville's Travels	French	Wright, Thomas (1848). Text. Henry G. Bohn.
1370s	Agrefeny	Khozhdenie Arkhimandrita Agrefen’ia Obiteli Preosviatye Bogoroditsy	Russian	
1384–1385	Leonardo Frescobaldi	Viaggio di Lionardo di Niccolò Frescobaldi in Egitto e in Terra Santa	Italian	Published 1821 by Guglielmo Manzi
1420	Nompar of Caumont	Voyaige d'Oultremer en Jhérusalem	French	First published 1858
1432–1433	Bertrandon de la Broquière	The Travels of Bertrandon de la Brocq́uière	French	Brocquière, Bertrandon de La (1807). Text. Translated by Thomas Johnes. Wright, Thomas (1848). Text. Henry G. Bohn.
1458–1462	William Wey	The Itineraries of William Wey	Middle English and Latin	Text. 1857. Mitchell, R. J. (1965). The Spring Voyage: The Jerusalem Pilgrimage in 1458. Murray.
1458	Roberto Sanseverino d'Aragona	Viaggio in Terra Santa	Italian	Text (in Italian). Presso Romagndi Dall' Acqua. 1888. Mitchell, R. J. (1965). The Spring Voyage: The Jerusalem Pilgrimage in 1458. Murray.
1458	Gabriele Capodilista	Itinerario in Terra Santa	Italian	Text (in Italian). Colonia, Pietro da. 1475. Mitchell, R. J. (1965). The Spring Voyage: The Jerusalem Pilgrimage in 1458. Murray.
1458	Giovanni Matteo Bottigella	Historia Jerosolomitana	Latin	Mitchell, R. J. (1965). The Spring Voyage: The Jerusalem Pilgrimage in 1458. Murray.
1458	Anton Pelchinger		German	Mitchell, R. J. (1965). The Spring Voyage: The Jerusalem Pilgrimage in 1458. Murray.
1458	Anonymous	Die peregrinacie van Jherusalem	Middle Dutch	Mitchell, R. J. (1965). The Spring Voyage: The Jerusalem Pilgrimage in 1458. Murray.
1480	Santo Brasca	Travel Account	Italian	
1480–1483	Felix Fabri	Evagatorium in Terræ Sanctæ, Arabiæ et Egypti peregrinationem	Latin	Vol. I, Part I. 1896. Vol. I, Part II. 1896. Vol. II, Part I. 1893. Vol. II, Part II. 1893.
1483 (travel; pub. 1486)	Bernhard von Breidenbach	Peregrinatio in Terram Sanctam	Latin	
1483	Paul Walter von Guglingen	Itinerarium in Terram Sanctam et ad Sanctam Catharinam	Latin	"Text". Mediterranean Historical Review. 32 (2): 153–188. 2017. doi:10.1080/09518967.2017.1396769. hdl:1887/69486. S2CID 220378469.
1486	Georges Lengherand	Travel Description of Venice, Rome, Jerusalem, Mount Sinai, and Cairo	French	
1486	Conrad Grünenberg	Description of a Pilgrimage from Konstanz to Jerusalem	Alemannic German	ed. J. Goldfriedrich & W. Fränzel (1912; facsimile ed. 2009); ed. K. Aercke (2005); ed. A. Denke (2010)
1486	Girolamo da Castiglione	Description of a Pilgrimage to the Holy Land	Italian	
1486	Anonymous pilgrim from Rennes, possibly Guy de Tourestes of Saintes	Description of a Pilgrimage to the Holy Land and Mount Sinai	French	
1480s (travel; pub. 1577)	Joos van Ghistele	Tvoyage van Mher Joos van Ghistele	Dutch	Published 1577
1493	Jan Hasištejnský of Lobkowicz	Putování k Svatému hrobu [Pilgrimage to the Holy Grave in Jerusalem]	Old Czech	Written 1505, published 1834
1586 (travel; pub. 1587)	Jean Zuallart	Il Devotissimo Viaggio di Gierusalemme	Latin	Zuallardo, Giovanni (1595). Text.
1598	Johannes Cotovicus	Itinerarium Hierosolymitanum et Syriacum	Latin	Latin, 1617; Dutch, 1619
1608	Kryštof Harant	Journey from Bohemia to the Holy Land, by way of Venice and the Sea	Czech	
1610 (travel; pub. 1615)	George Sandys	A Relation of a Journey Begun An Dom. 1610	English	Text
1634	Henry Blount	A Voyage into the Levant	English	Text
1639 (pub.; travel 1629)	Franciscus Quaresmius	Historica, Theologica et Moralis Terrae Sanctae Elucidatio	Latin	ed. Marcellino da Civezza, 1895), pp. 597–608. Cf. OCLC 82859339
c. 1653–1697 (travel; pub. 1717+)	Laurent d'Arvieux	Voyage dans la Palestine	French	French, 1717+; English, 1718+; English, 1962 (Lewis)
1652 (pub.; later eds. 1657+)	Jean Doubdan	Le Voyage de la Terre Sainte	French	1657; 1661; 1666…
1665	Jean de Thévenot	Relation d’un Voyage Fait au Levant	French	
1670s	Evliya Çelebi	Seyahatnâme	Ottoman Turkish	
1697 (travel; pub. 1703)	Henry Maundrell	A Journey from Aleppo to Jerusalem at Easter A.D. 1697	English	Text Wright, Thomas (1848). Text. Henry G. Bohn.
1700s	Elzear Horn	Ichnographiae Locorum et Monumentorum Veterum Terrae Sanctae, Accurate Delineatae et Descriptae	Latin	
1740–1744	George Anson	A voyage round the world, in the years 1740, 41, 42, 43, 44	English	Anson, George Baron (1853). Text.
1743	Richard Pococke	A description of the East, and some other countries	English	Text. Vol. 1. 1743.
1743	Jonas Kortens	Reise nach dem Weiland gelobten, nun aber seit Siebenzehn hundert Jahren unter dem Fluche liegenden Lande	German	Text (2 ed.). Joh. Christian Grunert. 1743.
1744	Anonymous	Travels of Two English Pilgrims	English	Text. 1744. pp. 339–.
1749–1752	Fredrik Hasselquist	Voyages and Travels in the Levant	English	Text. L. Davis and C. Reymers. 1766.
1759	Van Egmond van de Nijenburg; Johannes Wilhelmus Heyman	Travels through part of Europe, Asia Minor, the islands of the archipelago, Syria, Palestine, Egypt, Mount Sinai, &c.	English	Volume 1. 1759. Volume 2. 1759.
1783	Sauveur Lusignan	A history of the revolt of Ali Bey, against the Ottoman Porte	English	Text. 1783.
1783–1785	Constantin-François Chassebœuf	Travels Through Syria and Egypt	English	Text. Vol. 1. printed for G.G.J. and J. Robinson. 1788. Text. Vol. 2. 1788.
1786	François Baron de Tott	Memoirs of Baron de Tott	English	Tott, François Baron de (1786). Text (2 ed.).
1792	Giovanni Mariti	Travels Through Cyprus, Syria, and Palestine; with a General History of the Levant	English	Text. Vol. 1. Printed for P. Byrne. 1792.
1792–1798	William George Browne	Travels in Africa, Egypt and Syria	English	Text. 1799.
1799–1800 (campaigns; pub. 1823)	Francis B. Spilsbury; Edward Orme	Picturesque Scenery in the Holy Land and Syria	English	
1799–1801	William Wittman	Travels in Turkey, Asia-Minor, Syria, and across the desert into Egypt	English	Text. 1803.
1805–1806 (travel; pub. 1821)	Pierre-Amédée Jaubert; Pierre Lapie; Camille Alphonse Trézel	Voyage en Arménie et en Perse: fait dans les années 1805 et 1806	French	Text. 1821.
1806–1807 (travel; pub. 1812)	François-René de Chateaubriand	Travels in Greece, Palestine, Egypt, and Barbary During the Years 1806 and 1807	French	Text. 1812.
1810–1854	Ulrich Jasper Seetzen	Travels in Syria and Palestine	English; German	Text. 1810. Text (in German). Berlin, G. Reimer. 1854.
1813	Edward Daniel Clarke	Travels in Various Countries of Europe, Asia and Africa	English	Clarke, Edward Daniel (1813). Text.
1814 (travel; pub. 1818)	Henry Light	Travels in Egypt, Nubia, Holy Land, Mount Libanon and Cyprus, in the Year 1814	English	Text. 1818.
1816–1818 (travel; pub. 1822)	Robert Richardson	Travels Along the Mediterranean and Parts Adjacent ... During the Years 1816–17–18	English	Text. 1822.
1817–1818 (travel; pub. 1819)	William Macmichael	Journey from Moscow to Constantinople: In the Years 1817, 18	English	Text. J. Murray. 1819.
1817–1818 (travel; pub. 1823)	Charles Leonard Irby; James Mangles	Travels in Egypt and Nubia, Syria, and Asia Minor; During the Years 1817 & 1818	English	Text. 1823.
1818–1820 (travel; pub. 1821)	George Francis Lyon	A Narrative of Travels in Northern Africa, in the Years 1818, 19, and 20	English	Text. 1821.
1820	William Turner	Journal of a Tour in the Levant	English	Turner, William (1820). Text.
1820–1821 (travel; pub. 1822)	Johann Martin Augustin Scholz	Travels in the Countries Between Alexandria and Paraetonium ... in 1821	English	Text. R. Phillips. 1822.
1821–1825	James Silk Buckingham	Travels in Palestine and Arabia	English	Text. 1821. Text. 1825.
1822	John Lewis Burckhardt	Travels in Syria and the Holy Land	English	Full text
1822	Otto Friedrich von Richter (ed. J. P. G. Ewers)	Otto Friedrichs von Richter Wallfahrten im Morganlande ...	German	J. P. G. Ewers, ed. (1822). Text (in German).
1822	Thomas Robert Jolliffe; Andrew Dickson White	Letters from Palestine: Descriptive of a Tour Through Galilee and Judæa ... Letters from Egypt	English	Text. 1822.
1823	Frederick Henniker	Notes, During a Visit to Egypt, Nubia, the Oasis, Mount Sinai, and Jerusalem	English	Text. 1823.
1823	William Rae Wilson	Travels in Egypt and the Holy Land	English	Text (2 ed.). 1823.
1824	Josiah Conder	Palestine, Or, the Holy Land	English	Text. 1824.
1824–1827 (travel; pub. 1829)	Richard Robert Madden	Travels in Turkey, Egypt, Nubia and Palestine in 1824, 1825, 1826 & 1827	English	Text. Vol. 2. 1829.
1825	Barbara Hofland	Alfred Campbell, the Young Pilgrim: Containing Travels in Egypt and the Holy Land	English	Text. John Harris. 1825.
1826	John Carne	Letters from the East: Written During a Recent Tour Through Turkey, Egypt, Arabia, the Holy Land, Syria, and Greece	English	Text. Vol. 1. H. Colburn. 1826. Text. Vol. 2. H. Colburn. 1826.
1828	Pliny Fisk; Alvan Bond	Memoir of the Rev. Pliny Fisk, A.M.: Late Missionary to Palestine	English	Text. 1828.
1828	C. B. Walk	A Visit to Jerusalem and the Holy Places Adjacent	English	Text. 1828.
1830	John Fuller	Narrative of a Tour Through Some Parts of the Turkish Empire	English	Text. 1830.
1831–1833	Ferdinand de Geramb	Pèlerinage à Jerusalem	French	
1834	John Madox	Excursions in the Holy Land, Egypt, Nubia, Syria, &c: Including a Visit to the Unfrequented District of the Haouran	English	Volume 1, Volume 2
1835	Vere Monro	A Summer Ramble in Syria, with a Tartar Trip from Aleppo to Stamboul	English	Text. Vol. 1. 1835.
1835	Edward Hogg	Visit to Alexandria, Damascus, and Jerusalem, During the Successful Campaign of Ibrahim Pasha	English	Text. 1835.
1835–1837 (exped.; pub. 1868)	Francis Rawdon Chesney	Narrative of the Euphrates expedition: carried on by order of the British government during the years 1835, 1836, and 1837	English	Full text
1836	Thomas Skinner	Adventures During a Journey Overland to India: By Way of Egypt, Syria, and the Holy Land	English	Text. R. Bentley. 1836.
1836	George Jones	Excursions to Cairo, Jerusalem, Damascus, and Balbec ...	English	Text. Van Nostrand and Dwight. 1836.
1836	Thomas Hartwell Horne (contributors William Finden; Edward Francis Finden)	Landscape Illustrations of the Bible	English	Text. John Murray. 1836.
1837	Francis Arundale	Illustrations of Jerusalem and Mount Sinai: Including the Most Interesting Sites Between Grand Cairo and Beirout	English	Text. H. Colburn. 1837.
1837	George Robinson	Travels in Palestine and Syria	English	Text. 1837.
1837	John Lloyd Stephens	Incidents of Travel in Egypt, Arabia Petraea, and the Holy Land	English	Text. 1837.
1838	Alphonse de Lamartine	A Pilgrimage to the Holy Land ... During a Tour in the East, in 1832–1833	English	Text. 1838.
1838	Alexander Lindsay, 25th Earl of Crawford	Letters on Egypt, Edom, and the Holy Land	English	Text. 1838.
1839	John D. Paxton	Letters on Palestine and Egypt: Written During Two Years' Residence	English	Text. A.T. Skillman. 1839.
1840 (tour; pub. 1841)	Frances Egerton, Countess of Bridgewater	Journal of a Tour in the Holy Land, in May and June 1840	English	Text. Privately published. 1841.
1838 & 1852	Edward Robinson; Eli Smith	Biblical Researches in Palestine	English	Text. Vol. 1. Boston, Crocker & Brewster. 1841. Text. Vol. 1. 1856. Text. 1856.
1842	George Fisk	A Pastor's Memorial of Egypt ... Mount Sinai, Jerusalem ... Visited in 1842	English	Text. 1845.
1842–1849	David Roberts, William Brockedon and George Croly	The Holy Land, Syria, Idumea, Arabia, Egypt, and Nubia	English	2 vols. London, 1842; 1849
1843	Ida Laura Pfeiffer	A Visit to the Holy Land, Egypt, and Italy	English	Full text
1844	Walter Keating Kelly	Syria and the Holy Land: Their Scenery and Their People	English	Text. 1844.
1844	J. T. Bannister	Survey of the Holy Land: Its Geography, History, and Destiny	English	Text. 1844.
1845	Dawson Borrer; Louis Maurice Adolphe Linant de Bellefonds	A Journey from Naples to Jerusalem ... Including a Trip to the Valley of Fayoum	English	Text. 1845.
1845	Hester Lucy Stanhope (comp. Charles Lewis Meryon)	Memoirs of the Lady Hester Stanhope	English	Text. Vol. 1. 1845.
1847	Henry Stebbing	The Christian in Palestine: Or, Scenes of Sacred History	English	
1847	John Wilson	The Lands of the Bible: Visited and Described ...	English	Text. 1847.
1849	Malta Protestant College (committee)	Journal of a Deputation ... Sent to the East ... in 1849	English	Text. Vol. 1. 1855.
1849	William F. Lynch	Narrative of the United States' Expedition to the River Jordan and the Dead Sea	English	Text. 1849.
1850	Yehoseph Schwarz (trans. Isaac Leeser)	A Descriptive Geography and Brief Historical Sketch of Palestine	English	Text. 1850.
1850–1851	Louis Félicien de Saulcy	Narrative of a Journey Round the Dead Sea, and in the Bible Lands, in 1850 and 1851	English	Text. Vol. 1. 1854.
1851	Howard Crosby	Lands of the Moslem: A Narrative of Oriental Travel	English	Text. New York, Carter and brothers. 1851.
1851	Fred Arthur Neale	Eight Years in Syria, Palestine, and Asia Minor, from 1842 to 1850	English	Text. Vol. 1. Colburn. 1851.
1853	John Thomas	Travels in Egypt and Palestine	English	Text. 1853.
1853–1856	James Finn (ed. Elizabeth A. Finn)	Consular Chronicles of Jerusalem	English	Text. 1877. Elizabeth A. Finn, ed. (1878). Text.
1853–1867	Titus Tobler	Studies and Bibliography of Palestine	German	Text (in German). Vol. 1. Berlin: G. Reimer. 1853. Text (in German). 1867.
1854	Bayard Taylor	The Lands of the Saracen: Pictures of Palestine, Asia Minor, Sicily, and Spain	English	Full text
1851–1852 (travel; pub. 1854)	Charles William Meredith van de Velde	Narrative of a Journey through Syria and Palestine in 1851 and 1852	English	Text. Vol. 1. William Blackwood and son. 1854.
1855	Edward Thomas Rogers	Notices of the Modern Samaritans	English	Text. 1855.
1856	Joseph Dupuis	The Holy Places: A Narrative of Two Years' Residence in Jerusalem and Palestine	English	Text. Vol. 2. 1856.
1857	William Cowper Prime	Tent Life in the Holy Land	English	Text. 1857.
1857	Arthur Penrhyn Stanley	Sinai and Palestine: In Connection with Their History	English	Text. 1857.
1858	Ludwig August von Frankl	Nach Jerusalem!	German	Text. 1858.
1858	James Lewis Farley	Two Years in Syria	English	Text. 1858.
1858	Sarah Barclay Johnson	Hadji in Syria: Or, Three Years in Jerusalem	English	Text. 1858.
1858	James Turner Barclay	The City of the Great King: Or, Jerusalem as It Was, as It Is, and as It Is to Be	English	Text. 1858.
1858	F. N. Lorenzen	Jerusalem: Beschreibung meiner Reise nach dem heiligen Lande, 1858	German	Text (in German). 1859.
1859	Henry Stafford Osborn	Palestine, Past and Present: With Biblical, Literary, and Scientific Notices	English	Text. 1859.
1859	William McClure Thomson	The Land and the Book	English	Text. Vol. 1. 1859. Text. Vol. 2. 1859.
1860	Edward William Lane	An Account of the Manners and Customs of the Modern Egyptians	English	Text (5 ed.). John Murray. 1860.
1861	James Bell Forsyth	A Few Months in the East	English	Text. Printed by J. Lovell. 1861.
1862	Elizabeth Charles	Wanderings over Bible Lands and Seas	English	Text. 1862.
1863	William Henry Bartlett	Jerusalem Revisited	English	Text. 1863.
1864	John Mills	Three Months’ Residence at Nablus and an Account of the Modern Samaritans	English	—
1865	Henry Baker Tristram	The Land of Israel: A Journal of Travel in Palestine	English	Text. 1865.
1866	Carl Ritter	The Comparative Geography of Palestine and the Sinaitic Peninsula	English	Text. T. & T. Clark. 1866.
1867 (pub. 1869)	Mark Twain	The Innocents Abroad	English	Text 1869
1867–1868	Josias Leslie Porter	Travels and Handbooks	English	Text. T. Nelson. 1867. Text. 1868.
1868	William Hepworth Dixon	The Holy Land	English	Text. 1868.
1868	Alexander Wallace	The Desert and the Holy Land	English	Text. W. Oliphant. 1868.
1868	Victor Guérin	Description géographique, historique et archéologique de la Palestine. Judée	French	Text (in French). 1868.
1868	Adolf Neubauer	La géographie du Talmud	French	Text (in French). 1868.
1869	John MacGregor	The Rob Roy on the Jordan	English	Text. 1869.
1872–1880s	Claude Reignier Conder; Horatio Herbert Kitchener; Edward Henry Palmer	PEF Survey of Palestine	English	—
1870s	Nu'man al-Qasatili	al-Rawda al-Nu'maniyya fi Siyahat Filastin wa ba'd al-Buldan al-Shamiyya	Arabic	— Unpublished. Two of three sections rediscovered in Zahiriyya Library by Abdul-Karim Rafeq
1873	Henry Harris Jessup	The Women of the Arabs	English	New York: Dodd and Mead
1875	Isabel Burton	The Inner Life of Syria, Palestine, and the Holy Land	English	Text. H. S. King & Co. 1875.
1879–1882	Prince Albert Victor; George V	The Cruise of Her Majesty's Ship Bacchante	English	Text. 1886.
1881	Selah Merrill	East of the Jordan	English	—
1881–1887	Laurence Oliphant	Travels in Transjordan and Palestine	English	Text. D. Appleton. 1881. Text. 1887.
1889	Gottlieb Schumacher; Laurence Oliphant; Guy Le Strange	Across the Jordan	English	Text. 1889.
1893	Laura Valentine	Palestine Past and Present, Pictorial and Descriptive	English	—
1894	George Adam Smith	The Historical Geography of the Holy Land	English	—
1894	Eugène-Melchior de Vogüé	Syrie, Palestine, Mont Athos	French	Text (in French). 1894.
1896	Vital Cuinet	Syrie, Liban et Palestine	French	Text (in French). Paris, E. Leroux. 1896.
1894–1896 (travel; pub. 1918)	Pickthall, Marmaduke William	Oriental Encounters: Palestine and Syria, 1894–6	English	Full text

== 20th century ==
=== Ottoman period ===
- Baldensperger, P. J. (1913): The Immovable East: Studies of the People and Customs of Palestine, Boston
- Curtis, William Eleroy (1903): Today in Syria and Palestine. Fleming H. Revell Company, 1903.
- Forder, Archibald (1905). "Ventures among the Arabs in desert, tent and town; thirteen years of pioneer missionary life with the Ishmaelites of Moab, Edom and Arabia". Boston: W. N. Hartshorn.
- Grant, Elihu (1921): The People of Palestine archive.org
- Inchbold, A C (1906): Under the Syrian sun: The Lebanon, Baalbek, Galilee, and Judaea. With 40 full-page coloured plates and 8 black-and-white drawings by Stanley Inchbold Published by Hutchinson
- Kelman, John, John Fulleylove (1912): The Holy Land Illustrated by John Fulleylove, Published by A. & C. Black, 301 pages
- May, Karl Friedrich, 1842–1912, (1907/1908): Travel Tales in the Promised Land (Palestine)
- Wilson, C. T. (1906). Peasant Life in the Holy Land. New York: E. P. Dutton.

=== British period ===
- Livingstone, William Pringle (1923): A Galilee Doctor: Being a Sketch of the Career of Dr. D.W. Torrance of Tiberias, Published by Hodder and Stoughton, 295 pages
- Ludwig Preiss, Paul Rohrbach (1926): Palestine and Transjordania Published by Macmillan, 230 pages

== See also ==
- Palestine Pilgrims' Text Society
- Demographic history of Palestine
- History of Palestine
- List of travel books
- Cartography of Palestine
- Travelogues of Latin America
- List of sources for the Crusades

== Sources ==
- Stephanie Stidham Rogers (6 January 2011). Inventing the Holy Land: American Protestant Pilgrimage to Palestine, 1865–1941. Lexington Books. ISBN 978-0-7391-4844-0.
- Eveline van der Steen (14 October 2014). "Travellers in the Levant in the Nineteenth Century". Near Eastern Tribal Societies During the Nineteenth Century: Economy, Society and Politics Between Tent and Town. Routledge. pp. 18–. ISBN 978-1-317-54348-0.
- Le Strange, Guy (1890). Palestine Under the Moslems: A Description of Syria and the Holy Land from A.D. 650 to 1500. Committee of the Palestine Exploration Fund., London, 1890.
- Uzi Baram 2002 "Seeing Differences: Travellers to Ottoman Palestine and Accounts of Diversity" Journeys: The International Journal of Travel and Travel Writing 3(2):29–49.
