= Brasca =

Brasca may refer to:

- Brașca, Romanian village which with the village Ilișești form part of Ilișești, a commune located in Suceava County, Romania
- Patrick Brasca (born 1999), Canadian-Taiwanese pop singer and songwriter
- Santo Brasca (1444/45 – after 1522), an administrator and statesman in the Duchy of Milan

== See also ==
- Brascan, earlier name of Brookfield Asset Management
