= Alain Marchadour =

French Roman Catholic priest and exegetist (1937–2026)

- Born: 13 November 1937; Brittany, France
- Died: 3 May 2026 (aged 88)
- Occupations: Priest; Exegetist

Alain Marchadour, AA (French pronunciation: [alˈɛ̃ maʁʃadˈuʁ]; 13 November 1937 – 3 May 2026) was a French Roman Catholic priest and exegetist.

Marchadour joined the Assumptionists in 1966 and taught at the Catholic University of Toulouse. He moved to Jerusalem in 1999 and resided among the Assumptionists at the Church of Saint Peter in Gallicantu while teaching at the École Biblique and Ecce Homo. In 2001, he published a translation of the Bible alongside Florence Delay.

Marchadour died on 3 May 2026, at the age of 88.

== Works ==
- Un évangile à découvrir (1978)
- Le guide de l'animateur chrétien (1984)
- Lazare, Histoire d'un récit, récit d'une histoire (1988)
- Les grands thèmes bibliques (1988)
- L'évangile de Jean (1992)
- Les évangiles au feu de la critique (1995)
- Genèse (1999)
- Chemins de foi (2001)
