= Breviary of Jerusalem =

Antique Latin guidebook for Christian pilgrims to Jerusalem

Start of the B recension in the St. Gallen manuscript

The Breviary of Jerusalem (also called the Short Description of Jerusalem) is a short late antique Latin guidebook for Christian pilgrims to Jerusalem.

== Date and authorship ==
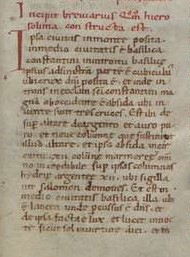
Start of the Breviary in the Milan manuscript

The date of the Breviary is uncertain. Dates from as early as the late 4th century or about 400 to as late as the late 5th or early 6th century or about 530 have been proposed.

The work is anonymous as it stands. Accepting a date from the time of Marcellinus Comes, who was still editing his chronicle in 534, Brian Croke has suggested that the Breviary could be a part of Marcellinus' lost work on Jerusalem. This work is known from a remark in Cassiodorus' Institutions, written in the 550s, that Marcellinus "has described the city of Constantinople and the city of Jerusalem in four short books in considerable detail."

== Manuscripts and editions ==
The Breviary is preserved in three manuscripts representing two recensions. These are, in chronological order:

- Oxford, Bodleian Library, MS Laud Misc. 263, at fol. 1r–v (from late 8th or early 9th century)
- St Gallen, Stiftsbibliothek, MS 732, at pp. 100–104 (from 811)
- Milan, Biblioteca Ambrosiana, MS M 79 sup., at fol. 44r–v (from 12th century)

Another copy of the Breviary was apparently in Iona Abbey in the 7th century, since it was one of the sources used by Adomnán in his De locis sanctis (698). The version found in the Oxford and Milan manuscripts is longer than that in the St. Gallen copy, but both versions contain unique material. It is thus impossible to reconstruct the original text, since the pathway by which the two text forms came about is underdetermined.

The Breviary has been printed several times. In the most recent edition, the Oxford and Milan text is called forma a and that of St Gallen forma b. They are printed in parallel columns. Brett Whalen has provided an English translation of the forma a. Paul Riant was responsible for an earlier Latin edition, which was translated by Aubrey Stewart for the Palestine Pilgrims' Text Society.

== Content ==
End of the Breviary in the Oxford manuscript

The title of the Breviary comes from the start of the A text: Incipit breuiarius quomodo Hierosolima constructa est ('Here begins the brief description about how the city of Jerusalem is built'). It is limited in scope to the city of Jerusalem and does not mention any other places in the Holy Land.

The Breviary is similar textually to the slightly later pilgrimage accounts of Theodosius and the anonymous pilgrim of Piacenza and all three may have made use of an official guidebook. Where they differ, the Breviary is closer to that of Theodosius. It begins with a description of the church of the Holy Sepulchre complex. It differs in order from both the aforementioned guides, describing the three main buildings—the Constantinian Basilica, the shrine of Golgotha and the church of the Anastasis—from east to west, the order found in the earlier Epitome of Eucherius. A major change in Christian pilgrimage had taken place between the time of the Epitome and the Breviary. The former does not mention the public display of relics associated with Jesus, but in the latter they are prominent.

The Breviary is the earliest source to mention the existence of a Church of the Holy Wisdom on the site of Pilate's praetorium. Other churches mentioned are the Church of Zion and the Church of Saint Peter.

== Bibliography ==
- Croke, Brian (2001). Count Marcellinus and His Chronicle. Oxford University Press.
- O'Loughlin, Thomas (2012). "The Presence of the Breuiarius de Hierosolyma in Iona's Library". Ériu. 62 (1): 185–188.
- Stewart, Aubrey, ed. (1890). The Epitome of S. Eucherius about Certain Holy Places (circ. A.D. 440), and the Breviary or Short Description of Jerusalem (circ. A.D. 530). Palestine Pilgrims' Text Society.
- Van Hoof, Lieve; Van Nuffelen, Peter (2020). The Fragmentary Latin Histories of Late Antiquity (AD 300–620): Edition, Translation and Commentary. Cambridge University Press.
- Weber, Robert, ed. (1965). "Breviarius de Hierosolyma". Itineraria et alia geographica. Corpus Christianorum Series Latina. Vol. 175. Brepols. pp. 105–112.
- Whalen, Brett Edward, ed. (2011). Pilgrimage in the Middle Ages: A Reader. University of Toronto Press.
- Wilson, Charles W. (1890). "Introduction". The Epitome of S. Eucherius about Certain Holy Places (circ. A.D. 440), and the Breviary or Short Description of Jerusalem (circ. A.D. 530). Palestine Pilgrims' Text Society. pp. iii–vi.
