= Richard Shiloh =

- Born: 1946; Warsaw, Poland
- Died: May 11, 2012 (aged 65–66); Ramla, Israel
- Known for: Sculpture, painting, illustration
- Website: richard-shiloh.com/Default.aspx

Richard Shiloh (1946 – 11 May 2012) was a Polish-born Israeli sculptor, writer, painter, illustrator, journalist and screenwriter.

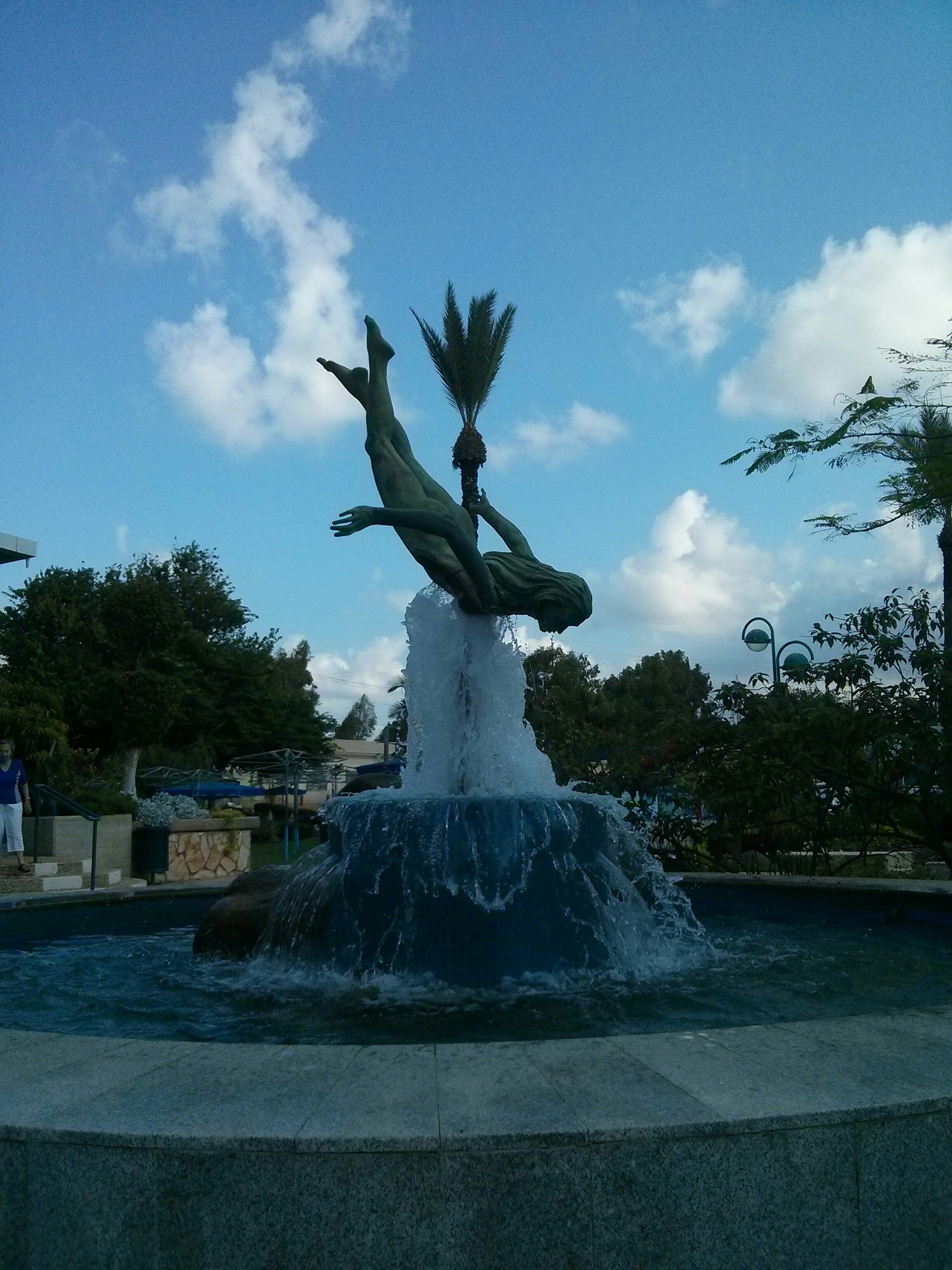
The Swimmer, Holon

== Biography ==
Shiloh was born in Warsaw, Poland, in 1946. In 1957, at the age of eleven, he immigrated to Israel with his family. He studied at the Renanim School of Arts. During his service in the Israel Defense Forces, he served as a combat engineer. After completing his military service, he studied sculpture and art history at an art academy in Munich, West Germany.

After returning to Israel, Shiloh worked as a crime reporter for the Israeli weekly HaOlam HaZeh and wrote scripts for Israeli Educational Television. Beginning in 2010, he served as art editor of the Israeli cultural magazine Yekum Tarbut.

Shiloh wrote and illustrated four books. He began writing his first book, Travels with Khorhirio, during the Yom Kippur War.

He created numerous monumental outdoor sculptures as well as smaller works, many of which are displayed in public spaces in Israel.

Shiloh was a sports and motorcycle enthusiast. On 11 May 2012, he died as a result of a motorcycle accident.

== Sculpture ==
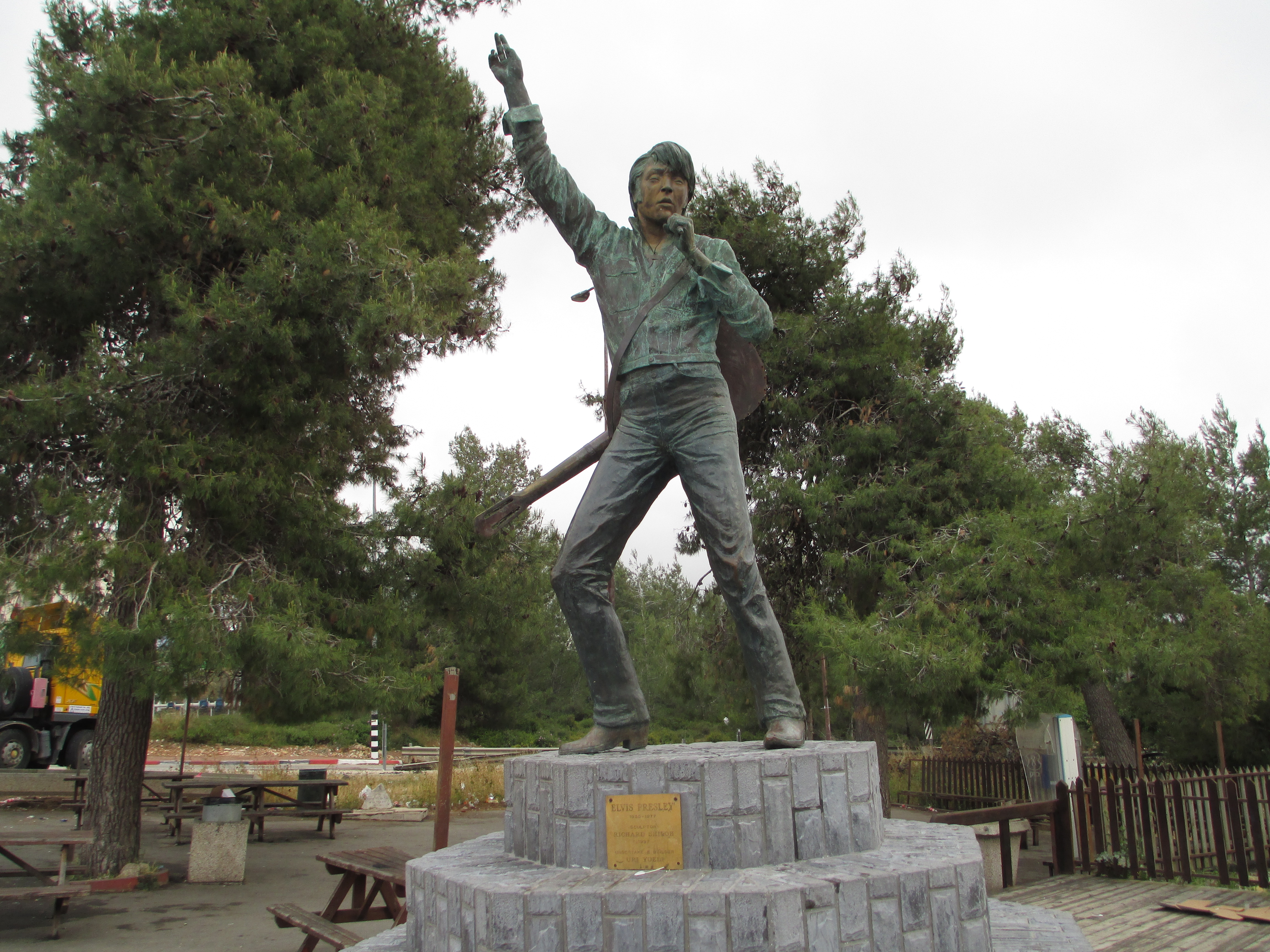
Shiloh's sculpture of Elvis Presley at the Elvis Inn in Neve Ilan

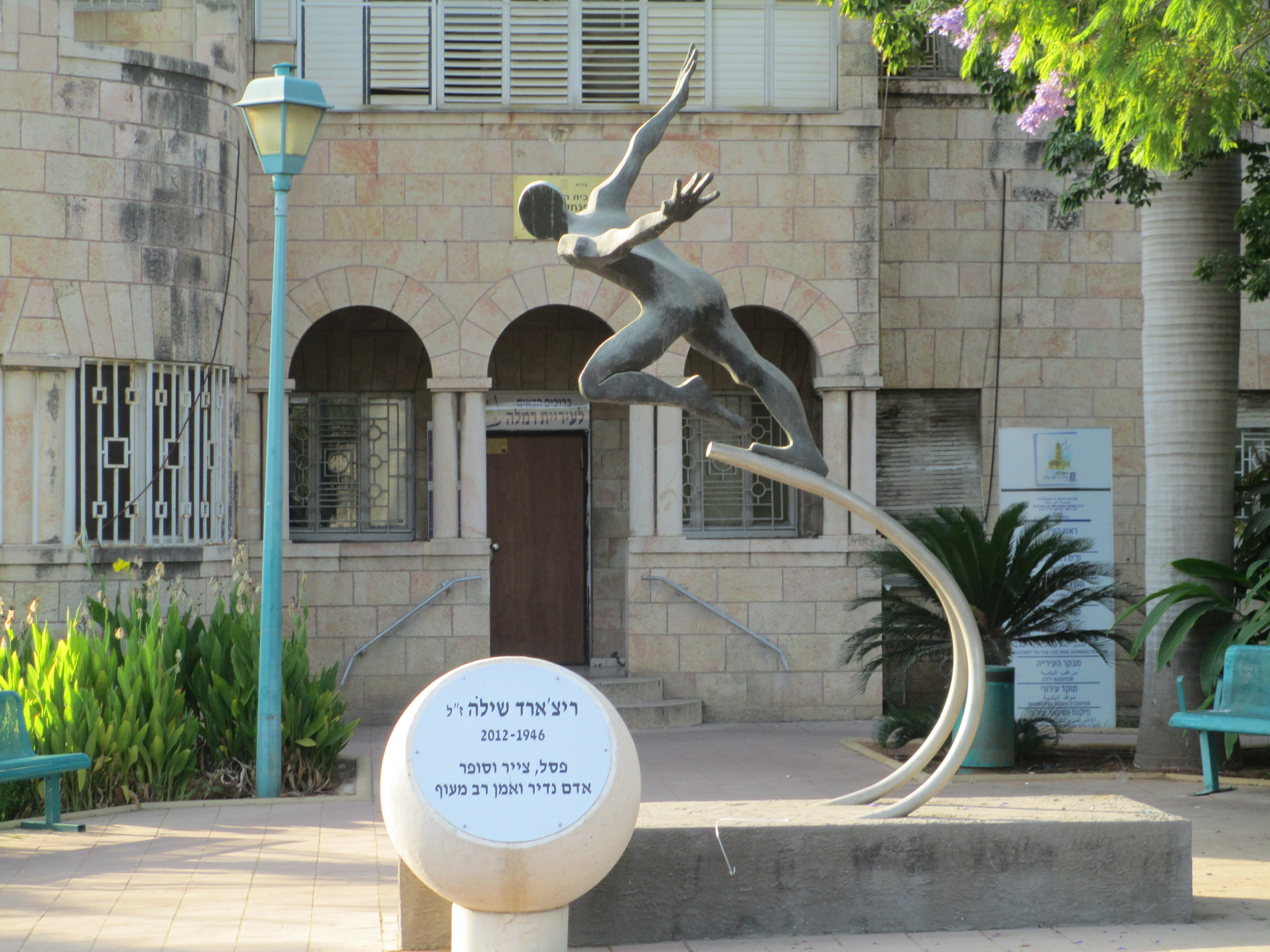
Flight at Ramla City Hall

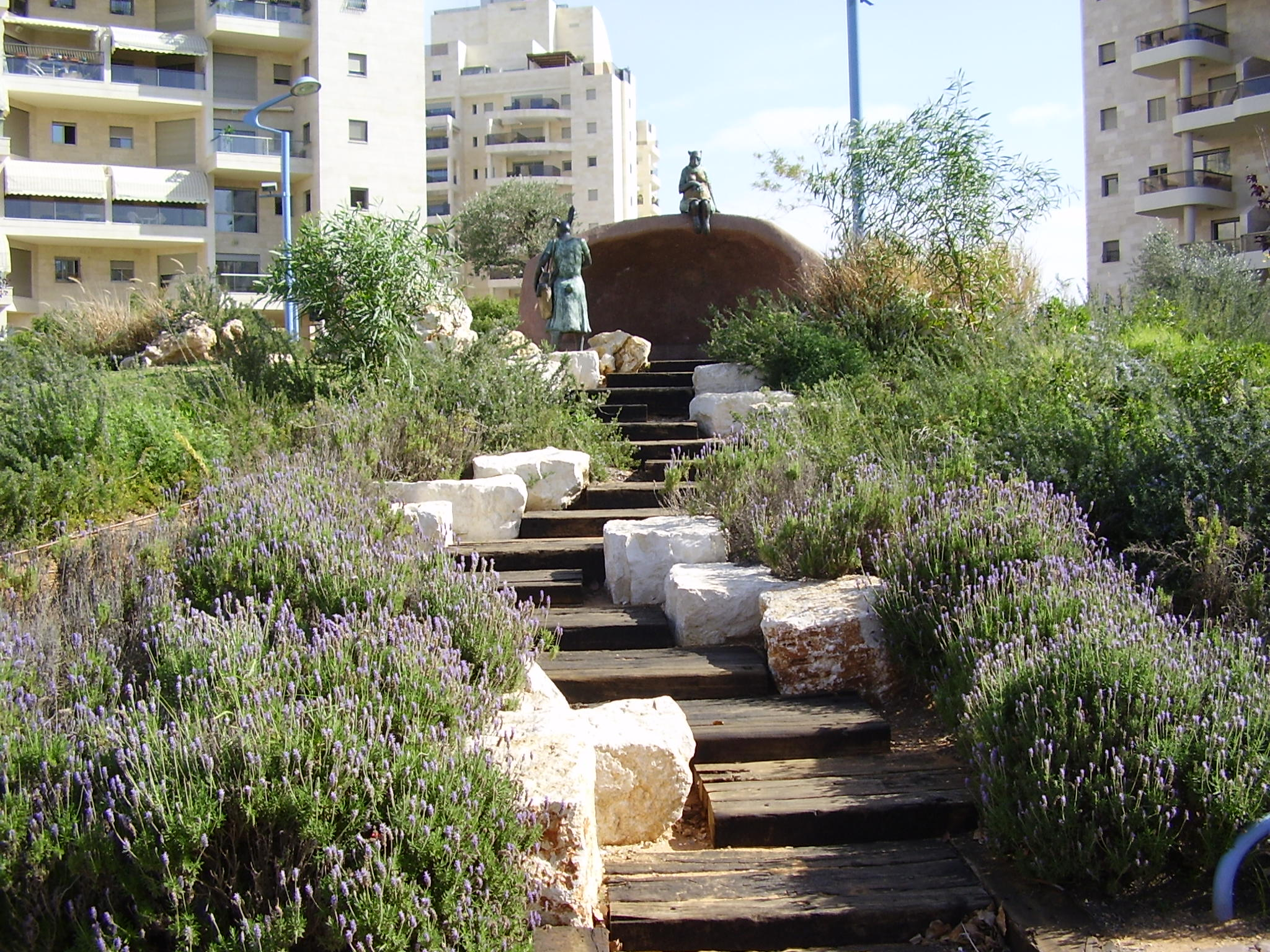
Sculptures based on Leah Goldberg's A Flat for Rent in the Story Garden Park in Holon

Shiloh created both large-scale public monuments and smaller sculptures. Among his works is the life-size sculpture The Struggling Man, displayed at the President's Residence in Jerusalem. Other works include a large portrait sculpture of Elvis Presley at the Elvis Inn in Neve Ilan, and sculptures based on Leah Goldberg's children's book A Flat for Rent, installed in the Story Garden Park in Holon.

Shiloh conceived and designed the statuette presented to winners of the Ophir Award, Israel's principal national film award, presented by the Israeli Academy of Film and Television.

Several of Shiloh's monumental outdoor sculptures are located in his home city of Ramla. Flight stands in front of Ramla City Hall. A monument created by Shiloh in memory of residents of Ramla who fell in Israel's wars stands on Weizmann Street, while his sculpture of Moses holding the Ten Commandments is located in HaHagana Park.

Another life-size work, the fountain sculpture The Swimmer, is installed at the entrance to a country club in Holon. A smaller work, The Puppeteer, is installed on an exterior wall of the Holon Puppet Theatre.

Shiloh also created several works for the Church of Saint Peter in Gallicantu in Jerusalem. During an extensive renovation of the church, which was reconsecrated in 1997, Shiloh sculpted its bronze entrance doors, designed by Jerusalem-based Palestinian Christian artist Benita Khoury. The doors depict Jesus foretelling Saint Peter's denial following the Last Supper. Shiloh also created the crucifix and cross for the sanctuaries of the upper and middle churches, a statue of the Suffering Servant of the Lord on the lower level, and a monument on the northern patio depicting Peter's denial of Jesus. The works were cast by G.I.I. Castings Ltd. in Abu Ghosh.

== Writing ==
Shiloh wrote in several literary genres, ranging from children's literature to thrillers, horror and post-apocalyptic science fiction. He created all the illustrations for Travels with Khorhirio and Sigalit the Warrior Princess, and designed the covers of all his books.

Shiloh occasionally incorporated versions of himself into his fiction. On the cover of Call It a Night, for example, he portrayed himself as the book's protagonist, the fictional "Grade A agent Alan Pratt". In No One Is to Blame, the protagonist is a Polish-Jewish writer named Richard Gold.

=== Books ===
- Masa'ot im Khorhirio (מסעות עם קורחיריו; Travels with Khorhirio), Massada Publishing, 1980.
- Sof HaLayla (סוף הלילה; Call It a Night), Kinneret, 1994.
- Ish Eino Ashem (איש אינו אשם; No One Is to Blame), Opus, 1997. The book was also translated into English.
- Sigalit HaNesikha HaLokhemet (סיגלית הנסיכה הלוחמת; Sigalit the Warrior Princess), Ktav, 2011. The book was also translated into English.
