= George Washington Montgomery =

American diplomat

George Washington Montgomery, or Jorge Montgomery (Alicante, Spain, 1804 - Washington D.C., June 5, 1841) was an American Spanish-born writer, translator and diplomat.

His father was an Irishman businessman, John Montgomery; his mother was perhaps a Spaniard. His father had lived in Boston and had settled in Alicante, where he was a U.S. consul. George spent his childhood in England, and studied Humanities in Exeter. Then he had some minor function in U.S. embassy at Madrid; afterwards he was secretary of Carlos Martinez de Irujo y Tacón, former Spanish minister to the United States from 1796 to 1807, married with an American lady, Sarah Maria Theresa McKean, with whom George held a long friendship. Thanks to U.S. minister Alexander Hill Everett, Washington Irving met his namesake in the Madrid tertulia of Mrs. Sarah McKean, a widow by then (1826), and the friendship between the two was never interrupted. Montgomery held various diplomatic positions: U.S. consul in San Juan de Puerto Rico, 1835–38; Tampico, 1840–41. He is entombed at Oak Hill Cemetery, Washington, D.C. in the Van Ness Mausoleum.

As a writer and translator, he wrote adaptations of some minor works of Washington Irving in Tareas de un solitario, and the first Spanish translation of A Chronicle of the Conquest of Granada by this author. In 1832, published El bastardo de Castilla, «historical novel, chivalrous, original» about the romantic medieval hero Bernardo del Carpio. In 1839, Narrative of a journey to Guatemala, in Central America, in 1838, an interesting travelogue about these regions, was published in New York.
