= Die peregrinacie van Jherusalem =

Start of Die peregrinacie in the Leiden manuscript

Die peregrinacie van Jherusalem (The Pilgrimage of Jerusalem) is an anonymous Middle Dutch account of a pilgrimage to the Holy Land undertaken in 1458. It is effectively a diary of visits to various Christian holy sites. It is found in a fragmentary copy in manuscript 10286 of the Additional manuscripts of the British Library in London, at folios 137r–146r, and in Leiden, University Library, LTK 318, at folios 162r–173v. The British manuscript is a watermarked paper copy of the same century. The Peregrinacie accompanies a Middle Dutch version of the Book of Sydrac, a Middle Dutch Cockaigne story and a Middle Dutch translation of the Lucidarius. The Leiden manuscript states that the account of the Holy Land was written by one who was there in 1458. Certain spellings and references to Nijmegen, Deventer and the IJssel suggest that the pilgrim was from the eastern Netherlands.

Die peregrinacie is a devotional work and not highly personal. Excerpts have been translated into modern Dutch.
