= Franciscus Quaresmius =

Italian writer and Orientalist

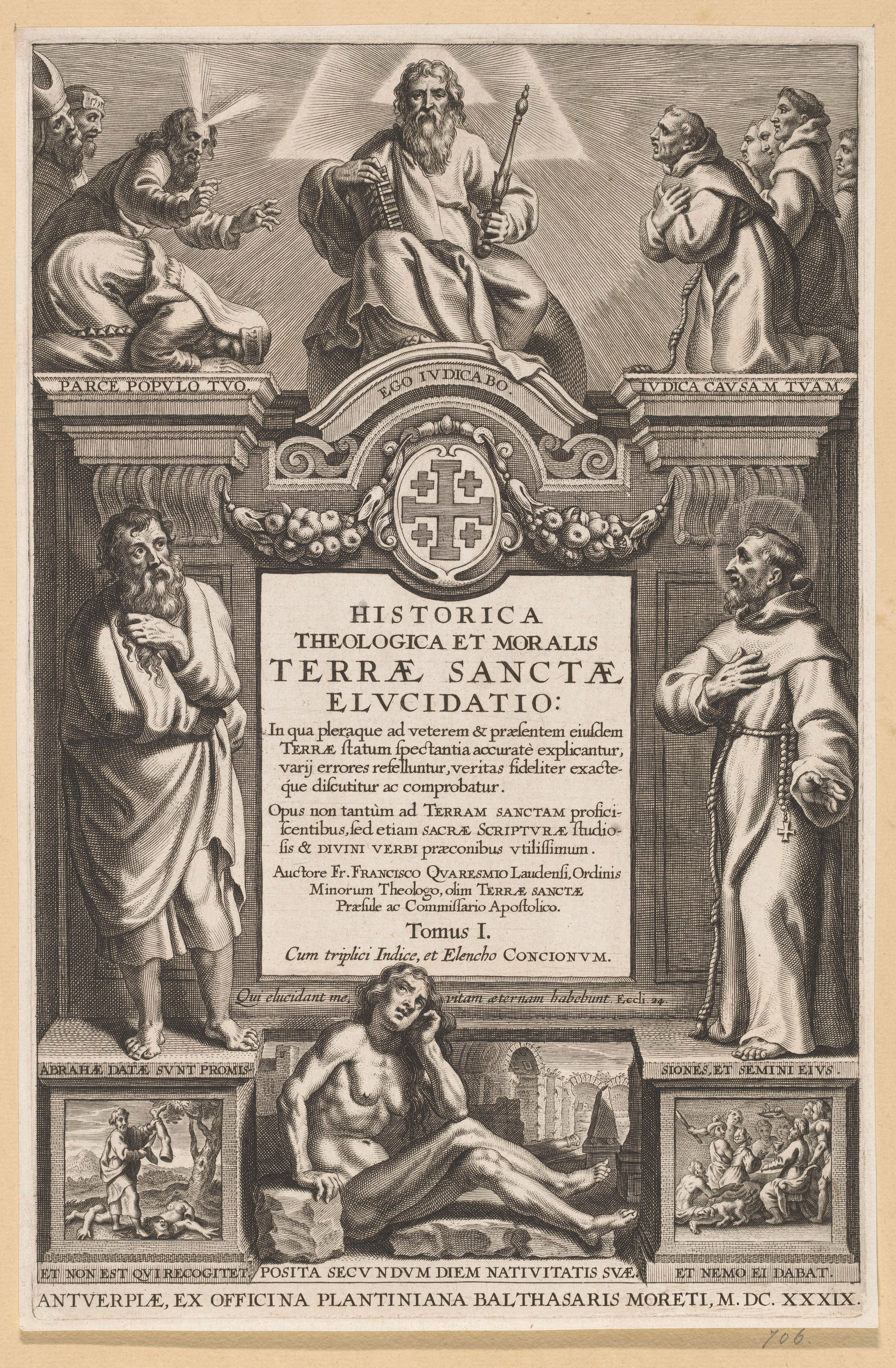
Elucidatio title page.

Francisco Quaresmio or Quaresmi (4 April 1583 – 25 October 1650), better known by his Latin name Franciscus Quaresmius, was an Italian writer and Orientalist.

== Life ==
Quaresmius was born at Lodi. His father was the nobleman Alberto Quaresmio and his mother Laura Papa. At an early age he was enrolled among the Franciscan Observantines at Mantua. For many years he held the chairs of philosophy, theology, and canon law, and became successively guardian, custos, and minister of his province. Later (1645-8) he occupied the two highest posts in the order, that of definitor and procurator general. The memoirs of the order extol his consummate virtue, particularly his piety, prudence, and extraordinary meekness. His long apostolate in the East and the works he left secured his fame, especially among earlier historians, Biblical scholars, and Orientalists.

On March 3, 1616, he went to Jerusalem, where he became Guardian and Vice-Commissary Apostolic of Aleppo in Syria (1616-8), and Superior and Commissary Apostolic of the East (1618–19). During this period he was twice imprisoned by the Turks. In 1620 he returned to Europe, but in 1625 was back in Jerusalem, whence the following year he addressed from the Holy Sepulchre an appeal to Philip IV of Spain, inviting him to reconquer the Holy Land, and at the same time dedicating to him his work, Hierosolymæ afflictæ. Between 1616 and 1626 he wrote his work Elucidatio terræ Sanctæ, a contribution to history, geography, archæology, Biblical and moral science.

During 1627-29 he was at Aleppo as papal commissary and as vicar-patriarch for the Chaldeans and Maronites of Syria and Mesopotamia. In 1629 he went to Italy to render an account to the Holy See of the state of the Eastern Churches; he then returned to the East, but how long he remained is not known. Meanwhile, he journeyed through Egypt and Sinai, the Holy Land, Syria, Mesopotamia, Cyprus, Rhodes, Constantinople, and a large part of Asia Minor; he also visited Germany, France, and the Low Countries. In 1637 he was guardian of S. Angelo (Milan), where in 1643 he completed his other work on the Passion of Christ.

He died in Milan in 1650.

== Works ==
His published works include:

- Historica, theologica et moralis terræ sanctæ elucidatio: in qua pleraque ad veterem et præsentem ejusdem terræ statum spectantia accurate explicantur (2 fol. vols., pp. xxx-924-98 and 1014-120, Antwerp, 1639); second edition edited by P. Cypriano da Treviso (4 pts. in 2 fol. vols., Venice, 1880-1);
- De sacratissimis D. N. J. Christi quinque vulneribus, varia, pia et luculenta tractatlo . . . [5, not 3, fol. vols.; I, 202; II, 258; III, 368; IV, 400; V, 271, besides an index of pp. 200 (Venice, 1652)], approved by the examining theologians in 1643, but unknown to bibliographers; only three copies are extant—one in the library of Brera, the Ambrosiana of Milan, and the National Library (Florence);
- Jerosolymæ afflictæ et humiliatæ deprecatio ad suum Philippum IV Hispaniarum et Novi Orbis potentissimum ac Catholicum Regem (1 quarto vol., pp. 74, Milan, 1631), very rare; there is a copy in the Ambrosiana of Milan and in the Biblioteca Nacional Mariano Moreno in Buenos Aires, as well as an English-language translation, edition, and study of the work by Chad Leahy and Ken Tully;
- Ad SS. DD. N. Alexandrum VII Pont. Opt. Max. Fr. Francisci Quaresmii Laud. Ord. Min. Pia Vota pro anniversaria Passionis Christi solemnitate (1 quarto vol., pp. xx-58, Milan, 1656), of which there is one copy in the Ambrosiana;
- Pro confraternitate SS. Stellarii B. Virginis Mariæ tractatus (1 quarto vol., Palermo, 1648);
- Itinerario di Caldea del Rev. P. Francesco Quaresmio e di Fr. Tomaso da Milano suo compagno. Min. Oss. e Giov. Batt. Eliano. Maronita, ed Elia Patriarca e con li Nestoriani etc. l'anno 1629, edited by Marcellino da Civezza as an appendix in Storia Universalle delle Missioni Francescane, vols. VIII-XI (1895), 597-608.

Still in manuscript are:

- Apparatus pro reductione Chaldæorum ad catholicam fidem ("six manuscript volumes", says Fr. Cyprian), which Quaresmius wrote when among the Chaldeans, and to which he refers in Elucidatio terræ sanctæ, I, li;
- Adversus errores Armenorum ("three volumes in folio", says Sbaralea), preserved in the Convent of Lodi;
- Deipara in Sanguine Agni dealbata, left incomplete by the author;
- Epistolæ ex oriente, in the archives of the Propaganda Fide.

These and other manuscript works are said to be preserved, some in the municipal library of Pavia and Lodi and some at Jerusalem.
