= Travelogues of Latin America =

Early travel writings on Latin America

Travelogues of Latin America are published accounts describing Latin America and the Caribbean by foreign travelers from early Iberian conquest to the early 20th century. The Spanish and Portuguese monarchs' efforts to restrict non-Iberian's access to Latin America during the colonial era mean that most of the works published before 1800 were by authorized Spanish or Portuguese chroniclers, or European Catholic missionaries. However, the popularity of Prussian naturalist Alexander von Humboldt's twenty-one volume account of his travels in Latin America marked a turning point. Starting in the 1820s, most independent Latin American governments welcomed increased exchanges with European visitors, increasing the number of German, British, French, and U.S. travelogues published. Many foreigners were interested in economic opportunities available in Latin America. At least 394 travelogues describing Mexico were published between 1810 and 1910. For Brazil, European and U.S. visitors published at least 158 travelogues between 1800 and 1899.

While scholars including Marjorie Agosín, June E. Hahner, and Miguel A. Cabañas have noted that these works replicate many of the biases of their authors, they are an important sources in the study of Latin American history.

== Travelogues by Country or Region ==
=== Argentina ===
- Beaumont, J.A.B.. Travels in Buenos Ayres, and the Adjacent Provinces of Rio de la Plata: with Observations Intended for the Use of Persons who Contemplate Emigrating to that Country. London: J. Ridgway, 1828.
  - J.A.B Beaumont was a British business person and traveler. In his travelogue Beaumont describes his experiences in Argentina, and describes the political effectiveness of local government and the demographics of Buenos Aires and surrounding areas. The text is focused on providing an informal description and perspective of potential benefits or risks that could come from emigrating to or investing in Buenos Aires.
- Denis, Pierre. The Argentine Republic, Its Development and Progress. London: T. F. Unwin, Ltd.: 1922.
- King, J. Anthony. Twenty-four Years in the Argentine Republic. New York: D. Appleton & company, 1846.
- MacCann, Two Thousand Miles' Ride through the Argentine Provinces. London: Smith, Elder & Co., 1853.
- Page, Thomas Jefferson. La Plata, the Argentine Confederation and Paraguay: being a Narrative of the Exploration of the Tributaries of the River La Plata and Adjacent Countries during the Years 1853, '54, '55, and '56, under the Orders of the United States Government. New York: Harper, 1859.
- Parish, Woodbine Sir. Buenos Ayres, and the Provinces of the Rio de La Plata. London: J. Murray, 1839.
- Vidal, Emeric Essex. Picturesque Illustrations of Buenos Ayres and Monte Video, Consisting of Twenty-four Views. London: R. Ackermann, 1820.
  - Emeric Essex Vidal, was a British painter and Naval officer, describes the areas of Buenos Aires and Montevideo, along with his own watercolor illustrations. He spends much of the travelog describing the physical characteristics of Buenos Aires and also highlights the social hierarchy of Argentina at the time, including his commentary on the indigenous populations and the institution of slavery.

=== Bolivia ===
- De Bonelli, L. Hugh. Travels in Bolivia. London: Hurst and Blackett, 1854.
  - The author of this Travelogue is De Bonelli, L. Hugh, a servant of the Britannic Majesties Legation. Published in 1854, we follow Bonelli as he travels all throughout South America, with a focus on Panama and Bolivia.
- Conway, William Martin, Sir, 1856–1937. The Bolivian Andes: A Record of Climbing & Exploration in the Cordillera Real in the Years 1898 and 1900. New York: Harper & Brothers,1901.
  - Sir William Conway was an English politician, art critic, and traveler who underwent notable expeditions into the Andes and Himalayas. Conway wrote on his experience following two trips to Bolivia, once in 1898 and again in 1900, focusing on mountaineering in the Andes and visits to La Paz, Lake Titicaca, and Potosi.

=== Brazil ===
- Bates, Henry Walter, 1825–1892. The Naturalist on the River Amazons: A Record of Adventures, Habits of Animals, Sketches of Brazilian and Indian Life and Aspects of Nature Under the Equator. London: J. Murray: 1863.
  - Henry Walter Bates was a notable english naturalist and explorer who is best known for an expedition into the Amazon Rainforest, which he led alongside Alfred Russel Wallace in 1848. After spending 11 years in Brazil, Bates was able to collect 14,712 different samples of species, most of those being insects. At the end of this trip he wrote down most of his experiences and discoveries from Brazil in his most notable book called The Naturalist on the River Amazons.
- Burton, Richard Francis, Sir, 1821-1890. Explorations of the Highlands of the Brazil; with a Full Account of the Gold and Diamond Mines. Also, Canoeing down 1500 miles of the Great River São Francisco, from Sabará to the Sea. London: Tinsley Brothers, 1869.
- Callcott, Maria, Lady, 1785-1842. Journal of a Voyage to Brazil, and Residence There, During Part of the Years 1821, 1822, 1823. London: Printed for Longman, Hurst, Rees, Orme, Brown, and Green 1824.
- A. P. D. G. Sketches of Portuguese Life, Manners, Costume, and Character: Illustrated by Twenty Coloured Plates. London: printed for Geo. B. Whittaker by R. Gilbert, St. John's Square, 1826.
  - The text includes chapter XVII with descriptions of Black life in Rio de Janeiro.
- Koster, Henry, 1793-ca. 1820. Travels in Brazil. London: Longman, Hurst, Rees, Orme, and Brown, 1816.
- Smith, Herbert H., 1851–1919. Brazil, the Amazons, & the Coast. New York: C. Scribner's Sons, 1879.
- Spix, Johann Baptist von, 1781-1826. Travels in Brazil, in the years 1817-1820. Undertaken by command of His Majesty the King of Bavaria. London: Longman, Hurst, Rees, Orme, Brown, and Green,1824.
- Stewart, C. S. (Charles Samuel), 1795–1870. Brazil & La Plata: Personal Record of a Cruise. New York: G.P. Putnam & co., 1856.

=== Central America ===
- Byam, George. Wild Life in the Interior of Central America. London: J. W. Parker, 1849.
  - Written by George Byam – an officer in the 43rd Regiment of the British Army – in 1849, Wild Life in the Interior of Central America provides information on the species, geography, and minerals Byam encountered traveling from El Realejo, Nicaragua to the Caribbean Sea. Throughout his account, Byam details the differences between his own perceptions of volcanoes, trophy-hunting, and wildlife with that of the native inhabitants of the region.
- Corlett, William Thomas, 1854-1948. The American Tropics: Notes from the Log of a Midwinter Cruise. Cleveland: The Burrows Brothers, 1908.

=== Chile ===
- Ball, John, 1818-1889. Notes of a Naturalist in South America. London, K. Paul, Trench & Co.: 1887.
  - John Ball was an Irish naturalist, politician and founder of the Alpine club, he traveled South America in 1882 and made biological observations as well as social commentary on his experience in Latin America. In his book “Notes of a Naturalist in South America”, John Ball documents his experiences and observations in multiple South American countries, notably Peru and Chile.
- Callcott, Maria, Lady, 1785-1842. Journal of a Residence in Chile, during the year 1822: and a Voyage from Chile to Brazil in 1823. London: Printed for Longman, Hurst, Rees, Orme, Brown, and Green, 1824.
  - Maria Graham was a travel writer, illustrator, children’s book author, and intellectual. She is known for her many travel books, including her Journal of Residence in Chile, which records the events of her years living in Chile as well as her travels to Brazil during 1823.
- Child, Theodore, 1846-1892. The Spanish-American Republics. New York: Harper & Brothers, 1891.
- Schmidtmeyer, Peter. Travels into Chile, over the Andes, in the years 1820 and 1821... London: Printed by S. McDowall, 95, Leadenhall Street for the author, 1824.
- Smith, Edmond Reuel. The Araucanians or, Notes of a Tour among the Indian Tribes of Southern Chili. New York: Harper, 1855.

=== Colombia ===
- Millican, Albert. Travels and Adventures of an Orchid hunter. An Account of Canoe and Camp Life in Colombia, while Collecting Orchids in the Northern Andes. London: Cassell & Company, Limited, 1891.
  - Albert Millican was an English orchid hunter, who made several trips to South America between 1888-1891 and made observations as well as social commentary about the natural land as well as the people he encountered. In his book “Travels and Adventures of an Orchid Hunter” Albert Millican documents some moments from his five journeys from England to Colombia in search of orchids.
- Mollien, Gaspard Théodore, comte de, 1796-1872. Travels in the Republic of Colombia: in the Years 1822 and 1823. London: C. Knight, 1824.
- Petre, Francis Loraine, 1852-. The Republic of Colombia: an Account of the Country, its People, its Institutions and its Resources. London, E. Stanford, 1906.
- Tompkins, Ellen A. On the Magdalena River: Seen on a Trip from Barranquilla to Bogotá, Colombia. New York City: Woman's Board of Foreign Missions, 1922.
- Walker, Alexander. Colombia: Being a Geographical, Statistical, Agricultural, Commercial, and Political Account of that Country. London: Baldwin, Cradock, and Joy, 1822.
- Wilson, Erastus, 1829-1910. A Ramble in New Granada. New York: [G.W. Carleton & Co.], 1878.

=== Costa Rica ===
- Calvert, Amelia Smith, b. 1876 and Phillip Powell Calvert. A Year of Costa Rican Natural History. New York: The Macmillan company: 1917.

=== Cuba ===
- Baker, Frank Collins, 1867-1942. A Naturalist in Mexico: Being a Visit to Cuba, Northern Yucatan and Mexico. Chicago: D. Oliphant, 1895.
- Ballou, Maturin Murray. History of Cuba: or, Notes of a Traveller in the Tropics. Being a Political, Historical, and Statistical Account of the Island, from its First Discovery to the Present Time. Boston: Phillips, Sampson, 1854.
  - Maturin Murray Ballou, a journalist and the owner of his own paper, Ballou’s Monthly Magazine, visited many places and created travel accounts throughout his life, one of them being Cuba. The following travelogue is an account of Cuba from its early periods to the 1850s, which contains many aspects such as history, slavery, the evolution of politics, culture, etc.
- Howe, Julia Ward. A Trip to Cuba. Boston: Ticknor, 1860.
  - Julia Howe Ward, an author, abolitionist, and social activist shares with her readers of the travelogue A trip to Cuba her experiences throughout the time she visited the country. Married to Samuel Gridley Howe, the mother of six children reports her discoveries along the way. The big journey of the author and her crew starts off in Nassau, in the Bahamas, from where they will then be transported to Cuba. She describes it as being “dragged along like a miserable thread pulled through the eye of an everlasting needle.”
- Humboldt, Alexander von, 1769-1859. The Island of Cuba. New York: Derby & Jackson, 1856.
  - Alexander von Humboldt, a German Enlightenment-era scientist, wrote The Island of Cuba to survey the climate, people, and economy of Cuba from a scientific and liberal lens. In the work, he devotes a chapter to the system of slavery in Cuba, and he asserts an abolitionist stance, vocalizing his worries that, if action is not taken, Cuba will have a slave revolt akin to Haiti.
- Rawson, James. Cuba. New York: Lane & Tippett, 1847.

=== Dominican Republic ===
- Day, Susan de Forest. "Chapter XI: Santo Domingo" The Cruise of the Scythian in the West Indies. New YorkL F. T. Neely, 1899.
  - Chapter XI of the Cruise of the Scythian in the West Indies is a travelogue by American author Susan De Forest Day, who sails to Santo Domingo, Dominican Republic in the late 19th century. Her account of the Dominican Republic is included along with travel accounts of several other Caribbean Islands, including Jamaica and St. Lucia.

=== Ecuador ===
- Enock, Charles Reginald, 1868-. Ecuador, its Ancient and Modern History, Topography and Natural Resources, Industries and Social Development. London: Unwin, 1919.
- Hassaurek, Friedrich, 1832-1885. Four Years among Spanish-Americans. London: Sampson Low, 1868.
- Whymper, Edward, 1840-1911. Travels Among the Great Andes of the Equator. New York: Charles Scribner's Sons, 1892.

=== Guatemala ===
- Brine, Lindesay, 1834-1906. "Chapter X: La Antigua Guatemala" in Travels amongst American Indians: Their Ancient Earthworks and Temples: Including a Journey in Guatemala, Mexico and Yucatán, and a Visit to the Ruins of Patinamit, Utatlan, Palenque and Uxmal. London: S. Low, Marston & Company, 1894.
- Montgomery, George Washington, 1804-1841. Narrative of a Journey to Guatemala, in Central America, in 1838. New York: Wiley & Putnam, 1839.
  - George Washington Montgomery was an American diplomat who worked as a US consul in Tampico and Puerto Rico. In this account, he details his trip to Guatemala and various stops along the way.

=== Haiti ===
- Candler, John. Brief Notices of Hayti: with its Condition, Resources, and Prospects. London: T. Ward & Co., 1842.
  - English Abolitionist John W. Candler was a devout quaker and outspoken abolitionist. He visited Haiti in 1842 to show that abolishing slavery was a boon to a state's economic status and benefit to its people's mental health.
- Mackenzie, Charles. Notes on Haiti, made during a Residence in that Republic. London: H. Colburn and R. Bentley. 1830.
  - Charles Mackenzie is a Scottish diplomat who toured Haiti in 1826. His observations of the country include his meetings with the Haitian president, his travel around the country, and general views on Haitian life.

=== Mexico ===
- Arnold, Channing. The American Egypt: a Record of Travel in Yucatan. London: Hutchinson & Co., 1909.
  - Arnold Channing focused on Mexico, specifically the people who lived in Yucatan. He studied Yucatan from different perspectives, specifically from an archaeology perspective. He focused a lot on the different structures/monuments that the Mayan people built and was fairly fascinated with their work.
- Baker, Frank Collins, 1867-1942. A Naturalist in Mexico: Being a Visit to Cuba, Northern Yucatan and Mexico. Chicago: D. Oliphant, 1895.
- Bates, J. H. (James Hale), 1826-1901. Notes of a Tour in Mexico and California. New York: Burr Printing House, 1887.
- Beaufoy, Mark, 1764-1827. Mexican Illustrations, Founded upon Facts; Indicative of the Present Condition of Society, Manners, Religion, and Morals, among the Spanish and Native Inhabitants of Mexico. London: Carpenter and Son, 1828.
- Blichfeldt, Emil Harry, 1874-. A Mexican Journey. New York: The Chautauqua Press, 1919.
- Calderón de la Barca, Madame (Frances Erskine Inglis), 1804-1882. Life in Mexico, during a Residence of Two Years in that Country. London: Chapman and Hall, 1843.
  - Fanny Calderon de la Barca was born to a family of landowners in Edinburgh, Scotland in 1804. After moving to the United States with her family, she met her husband Don Ángel Calderón de la Barca y Belgrano, born to Spanish parents in Buenos Aires, Argentina. This book is a collection of letters compiled from her time in Mexico accompanying her husband, who was designated as the first Spanish minister to Mexico after its independence. Her accounts of Mexican culture place high importance on the impact of Spanish influence, especially regarding the arts.
- Carpenter, William W.. Travels and Adventures in Mexico: in the Course of Journeys of upward of 2500 miles, performed on Foot; Giving an Account of the Manners and Customs of the People, and the Agricultural and Mineral Resources of that Country. New York: Harper & Brothers, 1851.
  - William Carpenter was an American war prisoner finding his way back to the North after being released. Throughout his account he highlights his perspectives of Mexican culture and society both during and after the Mexican-American War. Moreover, his account of Mexico provides the reader with exceptional detail of what Mexico looked like during the 1840’s.
- Carson, William English, 1870-. Mexico, the Wonderland of the South. New York: The Macmillan company, 1909.
- Conkling, Howard. Mexico and the Mexicans or, Notes of Travel in the Winter and Spring of 1883. New York: Taintor Brothers, Merrill and Co., 1883.
- Latrobe, Chas. Joseph. The Rambler in Mexico. New York: Harper Brothers, 1836.
  - Charles La Trobe, also shown as John Charles Latrobe, writes an account of his travels with American writer Washington Irving as they travel from the United states to Mexico, or as Latrobe calls it "New Spain," in the year 1834. Latrobe's opinions from the Gulf of Mexico to the bustling metropolis of major cities depicts the perfect form of a European travelogue of Latin America.

=== Nicaragua ===
- Bell, Charles N., 1854-1936. Tangweera: Life and Adventures among Gentle Savages. London, E. Arnold: 1899.
  - C. Napier Bell was a man who spent his younger years traversing through an undeveloped Nicaragua in the early to mid 1800s. Bell describes his awe and admiration for the landscape and speaks of his relationships with the indigenous people of Nicaragua.
- Kendall, John S[mith]. A Midsummer Trip to Nicaragua. New Orleans: Picayune Job Print, 1905.
- Oliver, Samuel Pasfield, 1838-1907. Off Duty: Rambles of a Gunner through Nicaragua, January to June, 1867. London: Taylor and Francis, 1879.
- Squier, E. G. (Ephraim George), 1821-1888. Nicaragua: Its People, Scenery, Monuments, and the Proposed Interoceanic Canal, with Numerous Original Maps and Illustrations. New York: Appleton, 1852.
- Worth, Worth, Joseph. Adventures and Narrow Escapes in Nicaragua. San Francisco: Spaulding & Barto, 1872.
- Wright, Hamilton Mercer, 1875-. Nicaragua, Land of Enchanted Vistas. Washington: Govt. print. off., 1918. Reprinted from the December, 1917, issue of The Bulletin of the Pan American Union.

=== Panama ===
- Chatfield, Mary A. Light on Dark Places at Panama. New York, Broadway Publishing Co: 1908
  - Mary A. Chatfield, an established American stenographer, traveled to Panama in 1905 to work under a Panamanian engineer. While fulfilling her responsibilities as a stenographer, she documented her observations and interpretations of Panamanian society through her travelogue.

=== Patagonia ===
- Beerbohm, Julius, 1854–1906. Wandering in Patagonia, or Life among the Ostrich Hunters. New York: Henry Holt and co., 1879.
- Bishop, Nathaniel H., 1837–1902. The Pampas and Andes: A Thousand Miles' Walk Across South America. Boston: Lee and Shepard, 1870.
  - Nathaniel H. Bishop was a naturalist and academic from Massachusetts who, upon reaching 17 years old made a journey down to South America to observe the land and culture. Along the way he crosses oceans, rivers, plains, and mountains all the while recording his interactions with the locals and wildlife.
- Dixie, Florence, Lady, 1857–1905. Across Patagonia. New York: R. Worthington, 1881.
  - Lady Florence Dixie, Scottish writer, feminist, and activist, records the highs and the lows of her travels through Argentina and Chile in Across Patagonia. On horseback, she and her companions encounter, and express their opinions on, Indigenous people, landscapes, animals (many of which she describes hunting), and natural obstacles to their journey.

=== Paraguay ===
- Clark, Edwin. Visit to South America. London: Dean and Son, 1878.

=== Peru ===
- Bingham, Hiram, 1875-1956. Inca Land: Explorations in the Highlands of Peru. New York: Houghton Mifflin Company, 1922.
  - Hiram Bingham was an American senator as well as a writer and explorer. He wrote several books on his expeditions to Latin America, and is credited with documenting the now famous Machu Picchu ruins in this travelogue.
- Brand, Charles, Lieutenant. Journal of a Voyage to Peru: a Passage across the Cordillera of the Andes in the Winter of 1827, performed on Foot in the Snow, and a Journey across the Pampas. London: H. Colburn, 1828.
  - Lieutenant Charles Brand was a European navy lieutenant. In the travelogue, he describes his travels through the snow while taking note of the environment and local people.
- Curtis, William Eleroy, 1850-1911. Between the Andes and the Ocean. Herbert S. Stone and Company, 1900.

=== Uruguay ===
- Clark, Edwin. Visit to South America. London: Dean and Son, 1878.

=== Venezuela ===
- Curtis, William Eleroy, 1850-1911. Venezuela: A Land Where It's Always Summer. Harper, 1896.
- Daunt, Achilles. Frank Radcliffe: a Story of Travel and Adventure in the Forests of Venezuela. New York: T. Nelson, 1884.
  - Achilles Daunt, a preacher from Owlpen, Gloucestershire, reflects on his journey through the forests of Venezuela with his long-time friend George Harrison. In his work, he depicts the beautiful terrain encountered, as well as the hardships of being exposed to the foreign elements of Venezuela.

=== South America (general) ===
- Bryce, James, 1838-1922. South America: Observations & Impressions. New York: Macmillan, 1914.
- Curtis, William Eleroy, 1850-1911. The Capitals of Spanish America. New York: Harper, 1888.
- Ford, Isaac Nelson, 1848-1912. Tropical America. New York: Charles Scribner's Sons, 1893.
  - Even though his travel account is called Tropical America, Ford travels around all regions of Latin America such as the coast of Ecuador, the Andes of Chile, the coast of Cuba and describes his experiences and interactions with the natives as well as with the nature of Latin America, providing a white perspective of Latin America. He arrives to some of these countries in difficult circumstances, including Chile in the aftermath of their civil war.
- Peixotto, Ernest Clifford, 1869-1940. Pacific Shores from Panama. New York: C. Scribner's Sons, 1913.
- Price, Rose Lambart, Sir, 1837-1899. The Two Americas An Account of Sport and Travel. London: S. Low, Marston, Searle, and Rivington: 1877.
- Warren, T. Robinson (Thomas Robinson), 1828-1915. Dust and foam or, Three Oceans and Two continents: Being Ten Years' Wanderings in Mexico, South America, Sandwich islands, the East and West Indies, China, Philippines, Australia and Polynesia. New York: C. Scribner, 1859.

== See also ==
- Brown University's Latin American Travelogues Digital Collection
- List of Travel Books
- Travelogues of Palestine

== Secondary literature ==
- Agosín, Marjorie and Julie H. Levison, eds. Magical Sites: Women Travelers in 19th Century Latin America. Buffalo, NY: White Pine Press, 1999.
- Blanton, Casey. Travel Writing: The Self and the World. New York: Twayne, 1997.
- Cabañas, Miguel A. The Cultural 'Other' in Nineteenth-Century Travel Narratives: How the United States and Latin America Described Each Other. Lewiston, NY: Edwin Mellen Press, 2008.
- Hahner, June E. Women through Women's Eyes: Latin American Women in Nineteenth-Century Travel Accounts. New York: Rowman & Littlefield, 1998.
- Hayward, Jennifer, “Latin America,” in The Routledge Companion to Travel Writing, ed. Carl Thompson. New York: Routledge, 2020, pp. 361–71
- Welch, Thomas L. Travel accounts and descriptions of Latin America and the Caribbean, 1800-1920 : a selected bibliography. Myriam Figueras, Columbus Memorial Library. Washington, D.C.: Columbus Memorial Library, Organization of American States, 1982.
