= Anton Pelchinger =

Illustrations by Pelchinger for a copy of Hrabanus Maurus' De laudibus sanctae crucis and Franz von Retz's Defensorium inviolatae virginitatis Mariae (1459)

Anton Pelchinger (died 18 September 1465) was a Bavarian Benedictine monk, artist and writer. He was born at Hofen, near Bad Aibling. He entered Tegernsee Abbey in 1442. There he served as Kapellmeister, chorister, organist and teacher of music. He also worked as a manuscript illustrator at Tegernsee and at Andechs Abbey. His illustrations are of high quality. In 1458 he went on a pilgrimage to the Holy Land, departing from Venice. He wrote a conventional description of Jerusalem and the Christian holy places. (Note: 197 pilgrims in two ships departed Venice at this time. Six of them wrote accounts: Pelchinger, William Wey, Roberto da Sanseverino, Gabriele Capodilista, Giovanni Matteo Butigella and an anonymous Dutchman.) He does not include any personal details, but identifies himself as a professor of Tegernsee. One manuscript of this work is in the Austrian National Library in Vienna (no. 3012) and there may be another in the Bavarian State Library in Munich.
