= Gabriele Capodilista =

Gabriele Capodilista (died 1477), also di Capo di Lista, de Capitibus Lista or de Capolista, was an Paduan nobleman, canon lawyer and humanist. He held administrative positions in Perugia (1473–1475) and Rome (1465, 1476). He is most famous today for the account he wrote in Italian of his 1458 pilgrimage to the Holy Land, the Itinerario in Terra Santa.

== Early life ==
Capodilista was born in Padua in the second decade of the 15th century. His father, Giovan Francesco, was a professor of canon and civil law at the University of Padua for forty years. His mother, Margherita di Nascimbene, came from Rhodes. He received his education in Padua.

In 1440, Capodilista visited Le Puy Cathedral, where he saw the relic of the Holy Prepuce. With his cousin Antonio Capodilista, he worked for Cardinal Ludovico Scarampi Mezzarota, Patriarch of Aquileia, for many years. He also held the office of praetor at Bologna.

== Pilgrimage ==
On 16 May 1458, he and Antonio set out on a pilgrimage to the Holy Land with their servant Tommaso. They embarked at Venice on the galley Loredana of Antonio Loredan. There were a hundred other pilgrims on the same ship, including Roberto da Sanseverino and John Tiptoft, both of whom the Capodilistas befriended. The English pilgrim William Wey and the German Anton Pelchinger travelled at the same time in a different ship. Capodilista, Sanseverino, Pelchinger and Wey all wrote accounts of their travels. After the pilgrimage, Tiptoft decided to go to Padua to enhance his education.

The Loredana rowed and sailed from Venice to Rhodes in 24 days. Capodilista followed the route on his own nautical chart. They spent three days on Rhodes, where the Capodilistas were hosted by Scarampi Mezzarota, who was on the island in his capacity as papal legate. They set out from Rhodes on 13 June and stopped on Cyprus on 17 June, where several people contracted an illness and died. They arrived at Jaffa on 19 June and waited two days for permission to disembark.

Capodilista and the other pilgrims dressed modestly so as not attract unwanted attention. He travelled to Jerusalem by donkey and then to Hebron, Samaria, Nazareth and the Sea of Galilee. The tour was managed by the owners of the galleys. The pilgrims were frequently counted by the local Muslim authorities. They slept in caves and paid heavy tolls. To Capodilista, the Holy Places appeared in ruins. His group returned to Jaffa on 3 July, put out on 5 July and arrived at Larnaca on Cyprus on 8 July.

On Cyprus, Capodilista visited Nicosia and met King John II. The latter, on his deathbed, granted him a coat of arms. The pilgrims left Cyprus on 14 July, arriving in Candia on 4 August. The Capodilistas spent ten days in Candia at the house of their relative, Antonio Querini, and arrived back in Venice on 6 September.

== Later life ==
Capodilista was back in Padua by January 1459, when Roberto da Sanseverino visited him. He received his doctorate in canon law on 24 December 1460. By this time a "knight and count" (eques et comes), he took up residence in a palace on the road from Padua to Abano Terme, dedicating himself to humanistic learning. A copy of the Fons memorabilium universi once owned by him is preserved in the Biblioteca Apostolica. To it he added an encomium of the city of Padua, citing Strabo and Albert the Great.

On 13 July 1465, Pope Paul II appointed Capodilista senator at a ceremony in Rome. On 4 April 1470, in Padua, he drew up a will making his wife, Romea, daughter of Antonio Borromeo, the primary beneficiary of his landed wealth, concentrated in the Paduan district of Mandria. From September 1473 until October 1475, he was the podestà in Perugia. His tenure was marked by the theft of the Holy Ring, which almost led to war with Siena. In 1476, he served another term as Roman senator, in which capacity he confirmed the statutes of the cloth and wool merchants' guilds. He was succeeded at Rome by Pietro Chitani. He died not long after returning to Padua, in January or early February 1477. He was buried in the chapel of San Prosdocimo in the Basilica of Saint Anthony.

== Itinerario ==
Capodilista's Itinerario is written as a guide for pilgrims. It contains practical advice, including the prayers one should say at each stop. It also includes itineraries for Mount Sinai and Saint Catherine's Monastery, which Capodilista did not visit himself. His account of the outward journey is detailed, perhaps to provide comfort to future pilgrims, for whom the long journey at sea was the most dangerous part. His account of the return journey is much shorter. He makes use of the Liber secretorum of Marino Sanuto the Elder and of the fantastic voyage of John Mandeville. He also appears to have exchanged notes with Roberto da Sanseverino, probably deriving his account of Sinai and Saint Catherine's from him. He dedicated the Itinerario to the nuns of San Bernardino in Padua.

Capodilista's Itinerario survives in four manuscripts. It was printed at Perugia during his time as podestà there. He was initially reluctant to publish it, but Paolo Boncambio persuaded him. Boncambio edited the text for publication, adding a Latin poem to the Virgin Mary by Gregory Tifernas and a prayer to Jesus in Italian verse. The name of the printer is not known. It may have been Johann Vydenast and company; Pietro da Colonia and Giovanni da Bamberga; Enrico Klayn; or Giovanni da Augusta. It was one of the earliest printings, if not the earliest, in Perugia, probably before 15 June 1475.

The Viaggio a Santo Sepolcro of Santo Brasca is based largely on Capodilista's Itinerario. More successful than its model, it was printed at Milan in 1481, 1497 and 1519.

== Bibliography ==
- Baldini, Ugo (1975). "Capodilista, Gabriele". Dizionario Biografico degli Italiani, Volume 18: Canella–Cappello (in Italian). Rome: Istituto dell'Enciclopedia Italiana. ISBN 978-8-81200032-6.
- De Dominicis, Claudio (2009). Membri del Senato della Roma pontificia: senatori, conservatori, caporioni e loro priori e lista d'oro delle famiglie dirigenti (secc. X–XIX) (PDF). Fondazione Marco Besso.
- Lepschy, Laura (2002). "Capodilista, Gabriele". In Peter Hainsworth; David Robey (eds.). The Oxford Companion to Italian Literature. Oxford University Press. ISBN 978-0-19-818332-7.
- Mitchell, R. J. (1938). John Tiptoft (1427–1470). Longmans.
- Mitchell, R. J. (1965). The Spring Voyage: The Jerusalem Pilgrimage in 1458. Readers Union.
