= Santo Brasca =

Milano statesman and pilgrim (1444–1522)

Santo Brasca (1444/45 – after 1522) was an administrator and statesman in the Duchy of Milan under the Sforza. He went on a pilgrimage to the Holy Land in 1480 and wrote a detailed account of his travels, Vaggio del Santo Sepolcro. He borrowed from the writings of an earlier pilgrim, Gabriele Capodilista, to augment his own account. He includes some practical advice for future pilgrims.

== Bibliography ==
- Lepschy, Anna Laura Momigliano (1972). "Brasca, Santo". Dizionario Biografico degli Italiani, Volume 14: Branchi–Buffetti (in Italian). Rome: Istituto dell'Enciclopedia Italiana. ISBN 978-88-12-00032-6.
- Lepschy, Laura (2002). "Brasca, Santo". In Peter Hainsworth; David Robey (eds.). The Oxford Companion to Italian Literature. Oxford University Press.
