= Marcellino da Civezza =

Italian Franciscan author

Marcellino da Civezza (Marcellinus of Civezza; secular name: Pietro Ranise) (born at Civezza in Liguria, Italy, 29 May 1822; d. at Livorno, 27 March 1906) was an Italian Franciscan author.

== Life ==
He entered the Order of Friars Minor in the Roman province, receiving the habit at Cori, 1 February 1838. He completed his philosophical-theological studies at Tivoli and Lucca.

In 1844 he obtained the degree of Lector (Professor) in philosophy, and in the following year, 17 May, was ordained priest. For some years he taught at Tivoli, Ferentino, Viterbo, Aracoeli in Rome; in 1854 he retired to Recco in his native province of Genoa. By order of Bernardino Trionfetti, minister-general of the Friars-Minor, Marcellino in 1856 was entrusted with the major task of writing the history of the Franciscan missions, to which the greater part of his life was devoted. He undertook journeys all over Europe, bringing home literary treasures, especially from the libraries and archives of Spain. Later on he resided mostly at Prato and at Rome, engaged in the publication of his works.

From 1881 to 1889, Marcellino was definitor-general of his order, and finally in 1899 he retired to the convent of Livorno, where he peacefully died. During his long literary career Marcellino made the acquaintance of many prominent men, with whom he carried on a large correspondence, preserved in the convent of Livorno. He enjoyed also the esteem of Pope Leo XIII, to whom he dedicated some of his works.

== Works ==
The total number of books and brochures published by Marcellino amounts to between seventy and eighty. His works include:

- "Storia universale delle Missioni Francescane" (Rome, Prato, Florence, 1857–1895), 11 vols in 8vo.
  - A French version of this work was begun by Victor-Bernardine de Rouen, 4 vols (Paris, 1898–99);
- "Saggio di Bibliografia geografica, storica, etnografica Sanfrancescana" (Prato, 1879), 8vo;
- "Epistolae Missionariorum Ordinis S. Francisci ex Frisia et Hollandia" (Quaracchi, 1888), 8vo;
- two periodicals: (a) "Crocana delle Missioni Francescane", 6 vols. 8vo (Rome, 1860–66; Fr. trans, Louvain, 1861–67); (b) "Le Missioni Francescane in Palestina ed in altre regioni della Terra", 8 vols. 8vo (Rome, Florence, Assisi, 1890–97);
- "Il Romano Pontificato nella Storia d' Italia", 3 vols. 8vo (Florence, 1886–87);
- "Fratris Johannis de Serravalle Ord Min. translatio et commentum totius libri Dantis Aldigherii, cum textu italico Fratris Bartholomaei a Colle eiusdem Ordinis" (Prato, 1891), in fol.;
- "La Leggenda di San Francesco, scritta da tre suoi Compagni (legenta trium Socioum) pubblicata per la prima volta nella vera sua integrita" (Rome, 1899; Fr. trans. by Arnold Goffin, Brussels, 1902).

Some of these were published with the collaboration of his friend Teofilo Domenichelli.
