= William Wey =

William Wey (or Way) (c.1407–1476) was an English traveller and author.

== Biography ==
Wey was born in Devon apparently in 1407, and was educated at Oxford, where he graduated M.A. and B.D. before the autumn of 1430, when he became fellow of Exeter College. He held his fellowship at least till 1442, if not later, and then became an original fellow of Eton College, though his name does not occur, as Harwood implies, in the charter of foundation.

Early in 1456 he started on a pilgrimage to the shrine of Santiago de Compostela, leaving Eton on 27 March, and sailing from Plymouth on 17 May. He reached Coruña on 21 May, and left it on his return home on 5 June, arriving at Plymouth on the 9th. As the statutes of Eton College forbade fellows to be absent more than six weeks, Wey probably obtained leave of absence similar to that granted him in a letter from Henry VI, among the archives at Eton dated 11 August [1457], to go on a second pilgrimage to holy places. He left Venice on 18 May 1458, reached Jaffa on 18 and Jerusalem on 24 June, leaving again on 2 July, and returning to Eton late in the autumn, the whole journey having taken thirty-nine weeks. On 26 February 1462, Wey left Eton for a second visit to Palestine, sailing from England on 13 March, and arriving at Venice on 22 April. He remained there five weeks, witnessing the ceremonies of St. Mark's day and those connected with the installation of Cristoforo Moro as doge in succession to Pascale Malopero. He left on 26 May, arriving at Jaffa on 16 July; he started back from Jerusalem on the 25th, and landed at Dover on 1 December.

Soon after his return from his third pilgrimage, Wey resolved to take the monastic vow, thereby vacating his fellowship at Eton. He entered the Augustinian monastery at Edingdon, Wiltshire, where he passed the remainder of his days. He gave that house some church furniture, relics, and curiosities which he had collected in Palestine, and died on 30 November 1476.

== Account ==
Wey left a remarkably detailed and interesting account of his pilgrimages, the Itineraries, formerly preserved in Edingdon monastery (not, as Aungier states, at Syon), and now in the Bodleian Library (MS. 565); it was edited with introduction and notes for the Roxburghe Club in 1857. The manuscript begins with two introductory treatises in prose, giving information useful for travellers, much in the manner of a modern guidebook; the narratives in verse follow in a stilted metre, said to resemble Lydgate's. That of the journey to Santiago de Compostela is the least interesting of the three, though it contains some information on the ecclesiastical condition of Spain. The narrative of the first journey to Jerusalem is detailed after Wey's departure from Venice, while that of the second journey is fuller on his travels across Europe.

=== Map ===
Wey's map of his pilgrimage is kept at the Bodleian Library, with the shelfmark MS Bodley 765.

== Other works ==
Besides his itineraries, Wey wrote 'Sermones dominicales super Evangelia per totum Annum' and 'Sermones de Festis principalibus et Sanctis cum aliis multis Sermonibus generalibus'; both were formerly extant in Syon MS. Q. 14 (Bateson, Cat. Libr. Syon Monastery, 1898, p. 162).

== Published editions ==
- The Itineraries of William Wey, Roxburghe Club, 1857 – via Internet Archive
- The Itineraries of William Wey, edited by Francis Davey, Bodleian Library 2010, ISBN 978-1-85124-304-4
