= Church of Saint Peter in Gallicantu =

Roman Catholic church in Jerusalem

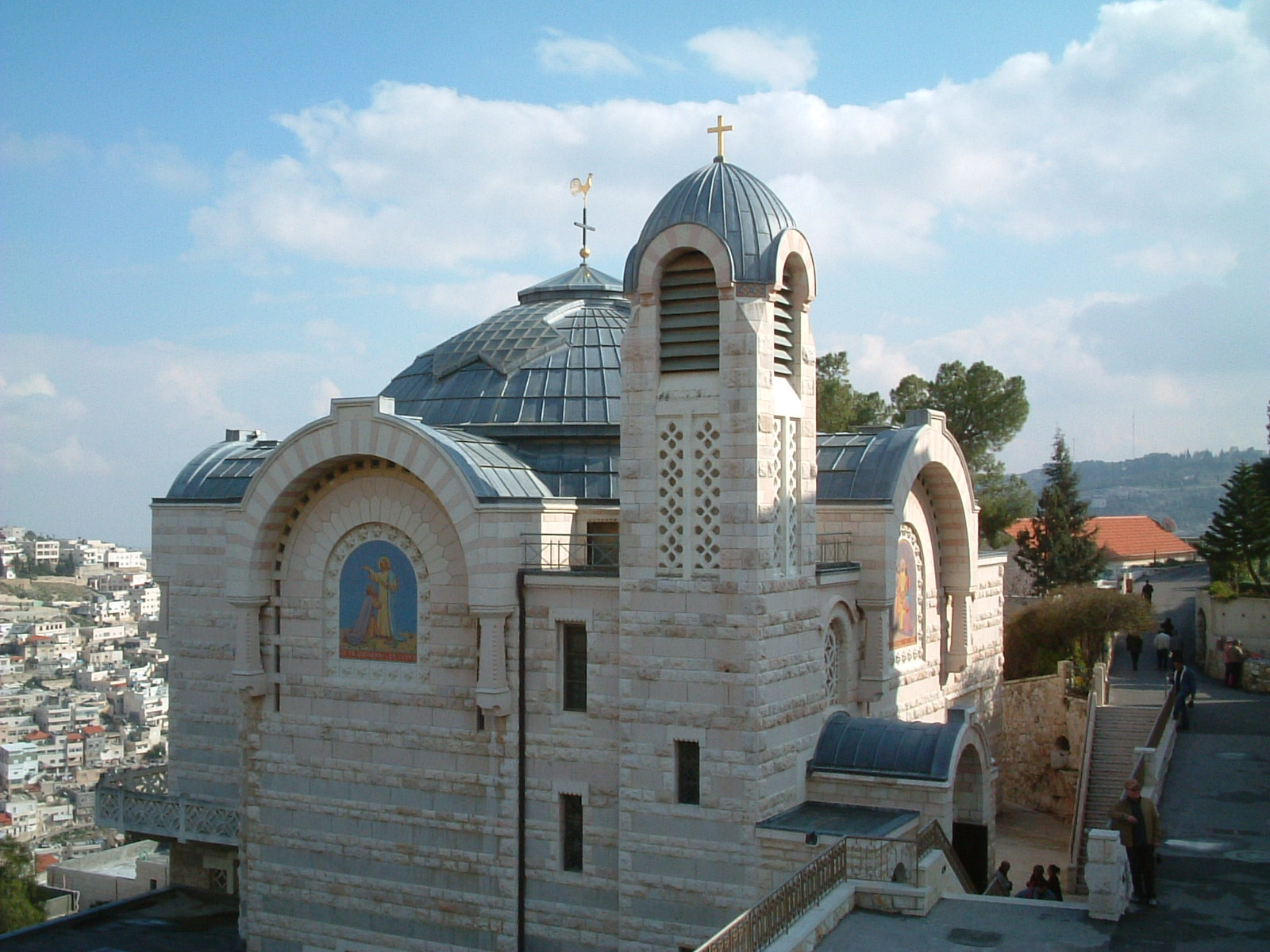
- Church of Saint Peter's in Gallicantu

Religion
- Affiliation: Roman Catholic
- Leadership: Augustinians of the Assumption

Location
- Location: Jerusalem
- Interactive map of Church of Saint Peter in Gallicantu
- Coordinates: 31°46′17″N 35°13′55″E

Architecture
- Completed: 1931

Website
- www.assumptio.org

Church of Saint Peter in Gallicantu is a Roman Catholic church located on the eastern slope of Mount Zion, just outside the walled Old City of Jerusalem. It is dedicated to the episode from the New Testament known as the Denial of Peter.

== Etymology ==
The church takes its name from the Latin word "gallicantu", meaning "at cock's-crow".

== Significance ==
The name has been given in commemoration of Peter's triple denial of being associated with Jesus during the night of his arrest "... before the cock crows twice" (Mark 14:30), and has been introduced by the Crusaders.

This is believed to be the location of the palace of Caiaphas, the Jewish High Priest who sat in judgement over Jesus, where Peter's triple denial took place. According to the Pilgrim of Bordeaux in his Itinerarium Burdigalense, "...going up from the Pool of Siloe to Mount Zion one would come across the House of the Priest Caiaphas."

== History ==
A Byzantine shrine dedicated to Peter's repentance was erected on this spot in AD 457, but was destroyed by the Fatimid caliph Al-Hakim bi-Amr Allah in 1010. The chapel was rebuilt by Crusaders in 1102 and given its present name. After the fall of Jerusalem in 1187, the church again fell into ruin and was not rebuilt until 1931. Today a golden rooster protrudes prominently from the sanctuary roof in honor of its biblical connection.

The church belongs to the Assumptionist Fathers, a French order established in 1887 and named for Mary's Assumption into heaven.

== Layout and design ==
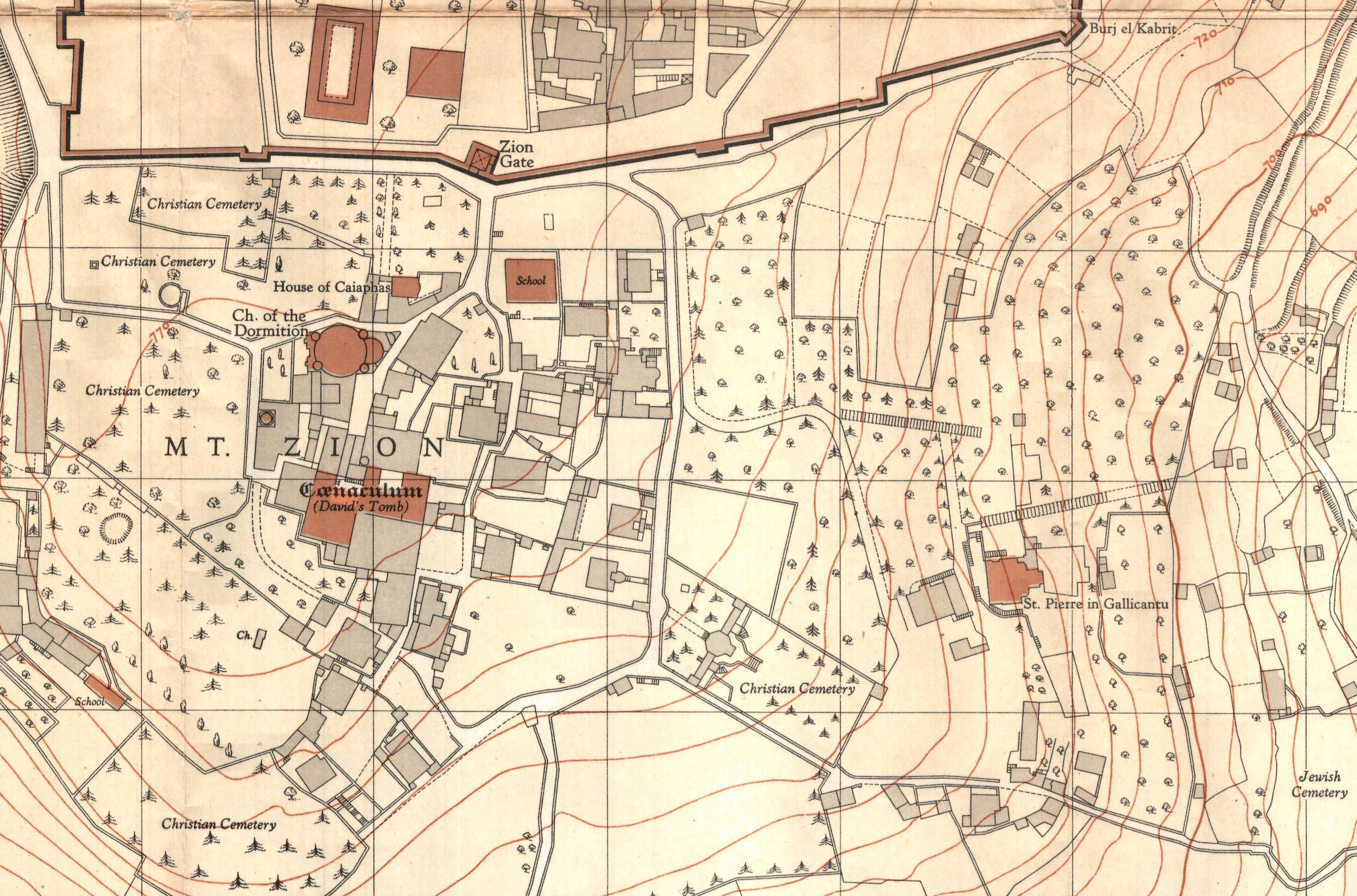
The church in the 1936 Old City of Jerusalem map by Survey of Palestine

=== Upper church ===
The entrance to the church is from a parking lot located above the main level of the church. In the courtyard is a statue that depicts the events of the denial and include its main figures: the cock, the woman, and the Roman soldier. The inscription includes the biblical passage: But he denied him, saying "Woman, I know him not"! (Luke 22:57). The entrance itself is flanked by wrought iron doors covered with biblical bas reliefs. To the right are two Byzantine-era mosaics found during excavation, these were most likely part of the floor of the fifth-century shrine. The main sanctuary contains large, multi-colored mosaics portraying figures from the New Testament. Facing the entrance is a bound Jesus being questioned at Caiaphas' palace; on the right Jesus and the disciples are shown dining at the Last Supper; and on the left Peter, considered the first Pope, is pictured in ancient papal dress. Perhaps the most striking feature of the interior is the ceiling, which is dominated by a huge cross-shaped window designed in a variety of colors. The fourteen Stations of the Cross line the walls and are marked with simple crosses.

=== Lower chapel ===
Beneath the upper church is a chapel which incorporates stone from ancient grottos inside its walls. Down a hole in the center of the sanctuary one can see caves that may have been part of the Byzantine shrine. These walls are engraved with crosses left by fifth-century Christians.

=== Ancient underground chambers ===
On an even lower level there is a succession of caves from the Second Temple period. Since tradition places the palace of Caiaphas on this site, many believe that Jesus may have been imprisoned in one of these underground crypts after his arrest; however, these caves were normal in many Roman-era homes, and often served as cellars, water cisterns, and baths.

=== Ancient staircase ===
On the north side of the church is an ancient staircase that leads down towards the Kidron Valley. This may have been a passage from the upper city to the lower city during the First Temple period. Many Christians believe that Jesus followed this path down to Gethsemane the night of his arrest.

== Gallery ==
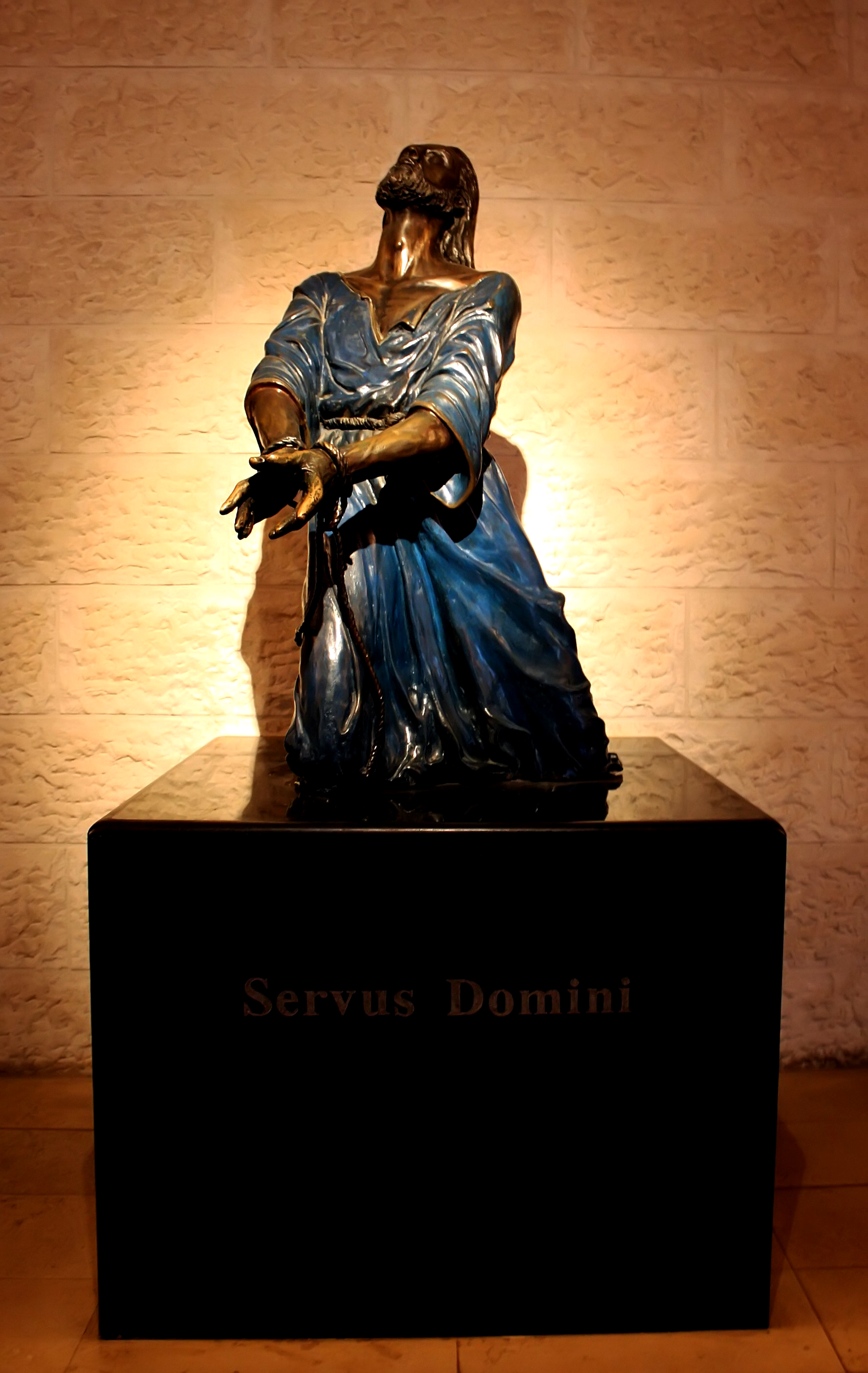
Sculpture of Jesus, which replicates the imprisoned Jesus

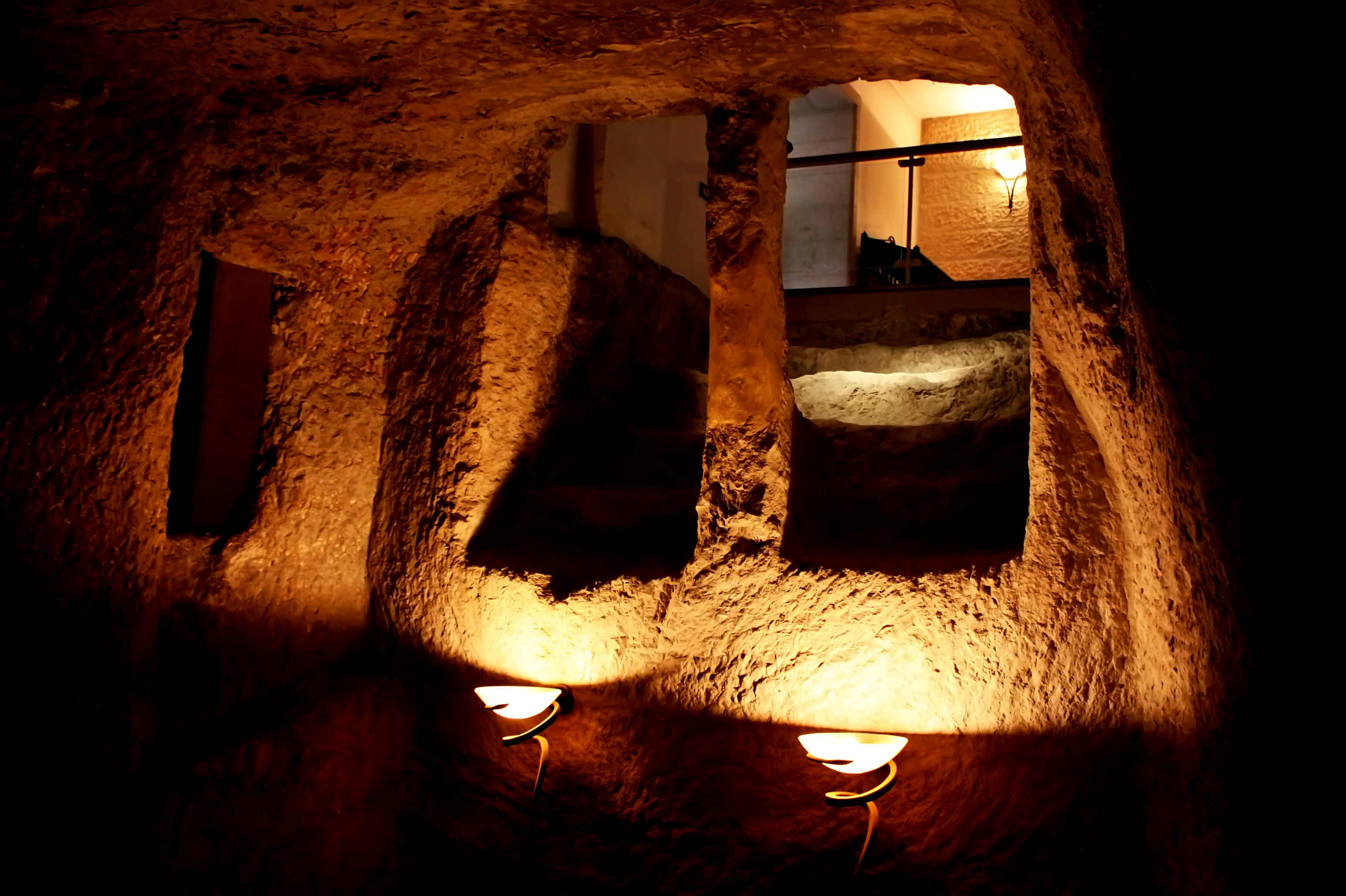
Sacred Pit (dungeon) / caves (prison), where Jesus was allegedly kept

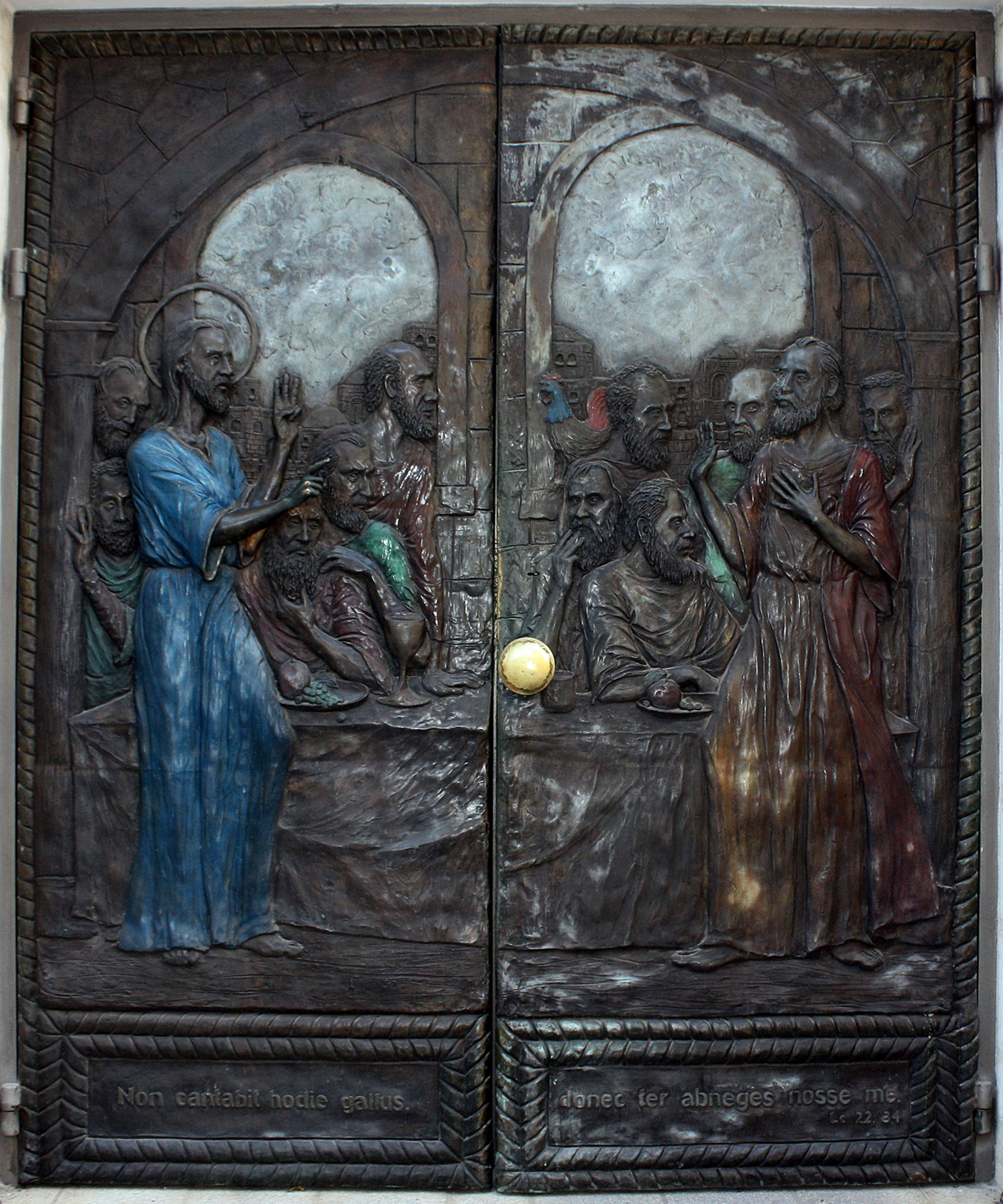
Engraved art work on door ("I tell you, Peter, before the rooster crows today, you will deny three times that you know me." Luke 22:34)

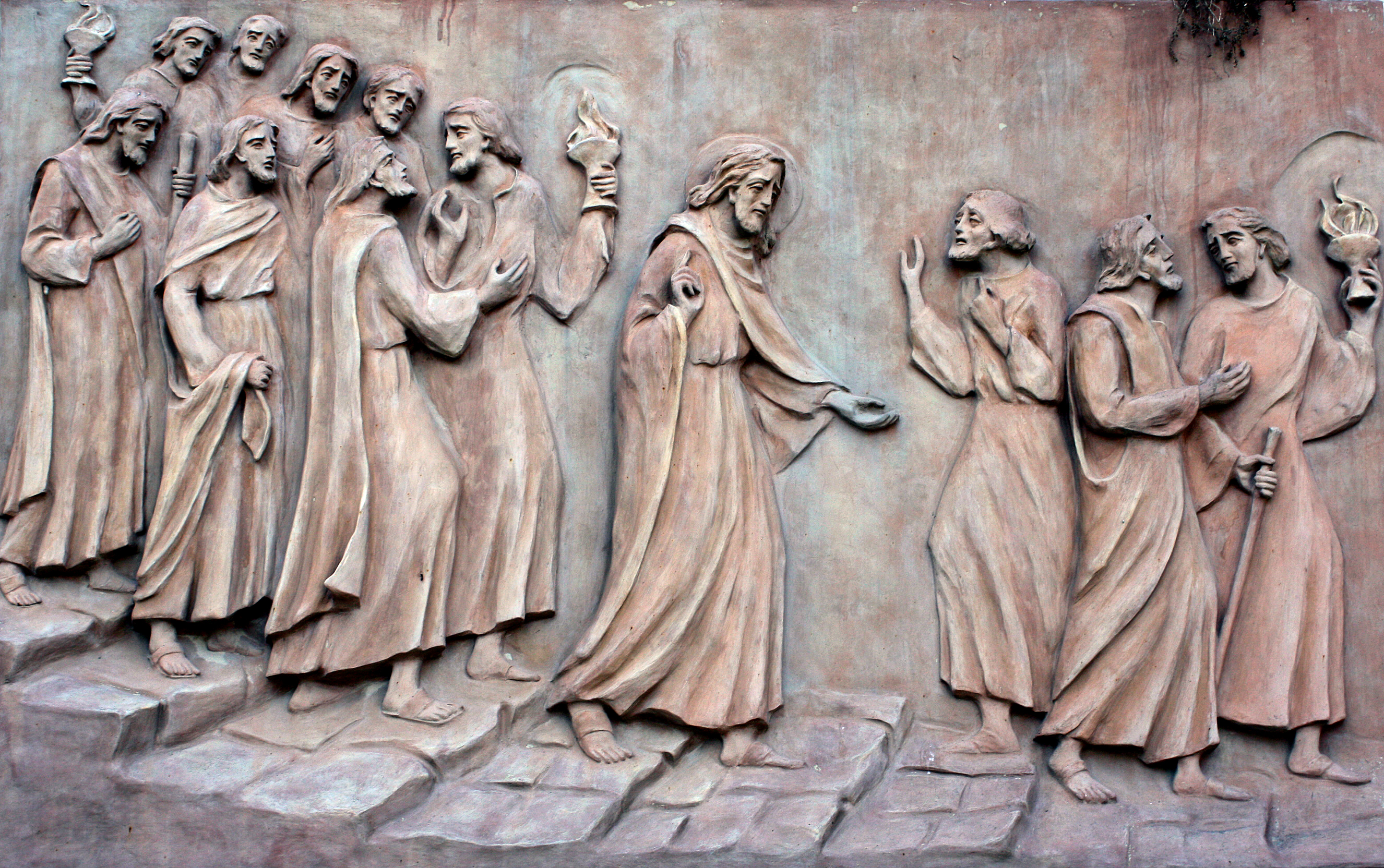
Jesus and the apostles after the Last Supper, modern relief above ancient staircase

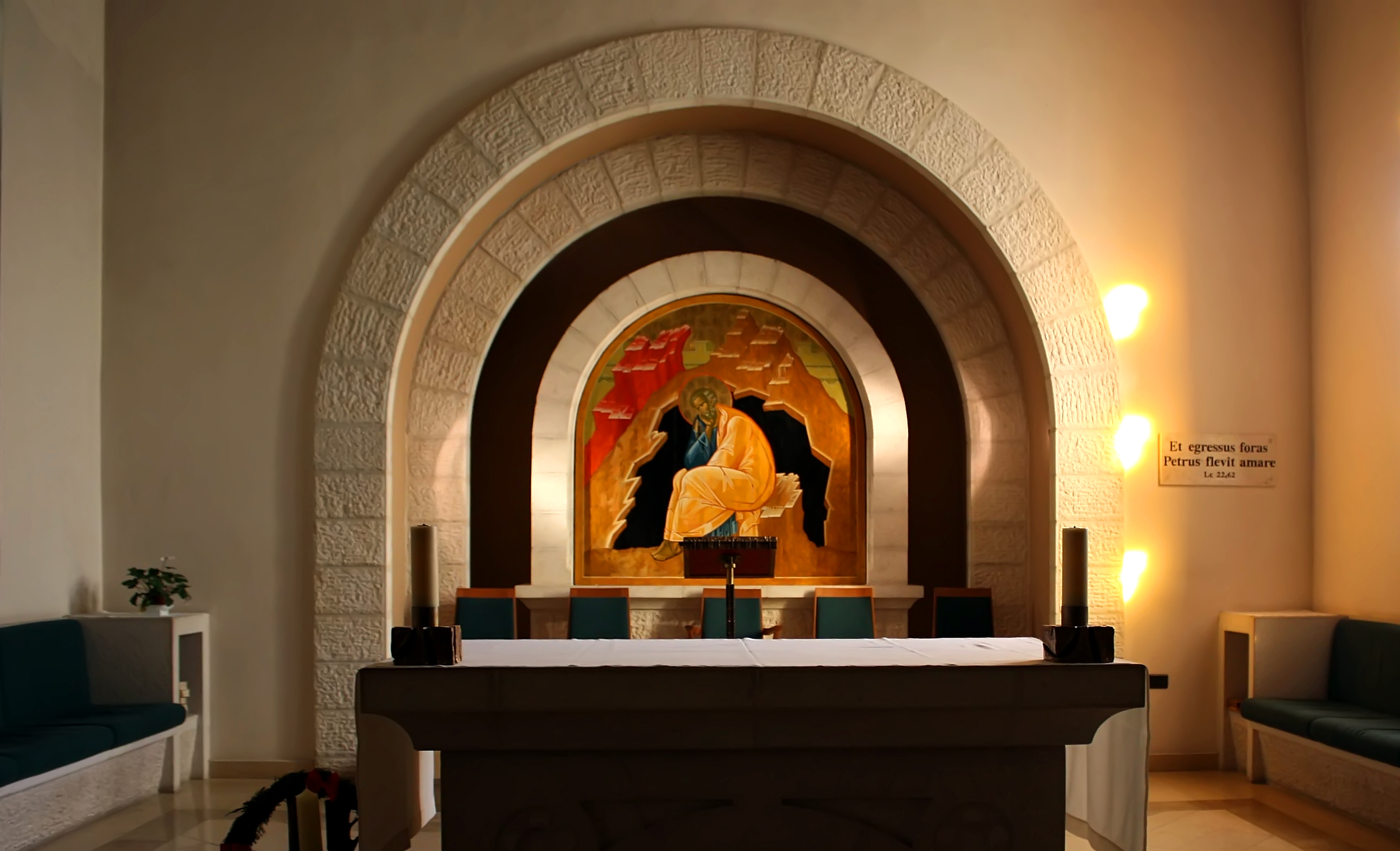
Altar in the chapel

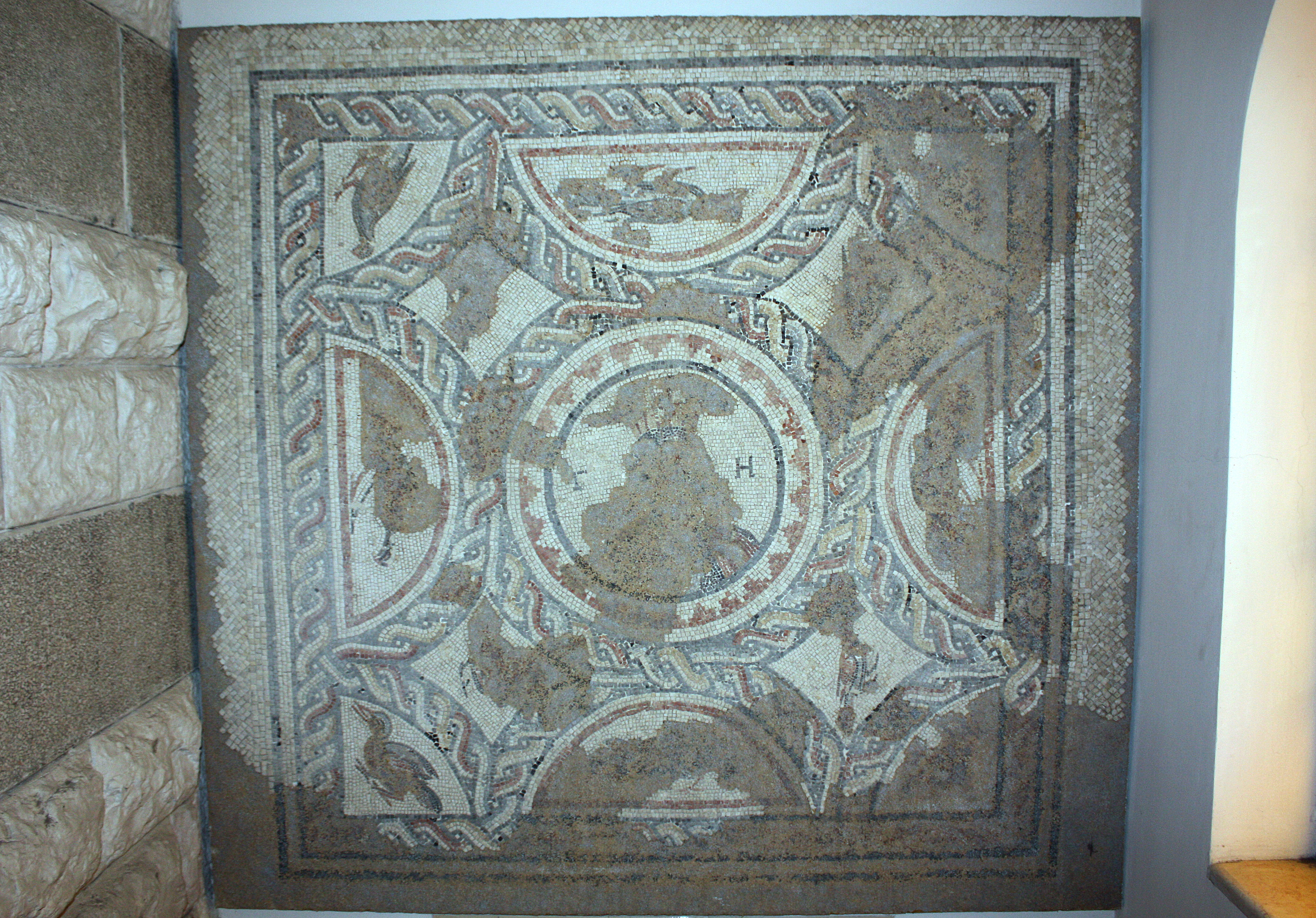
Byzantine mosaic

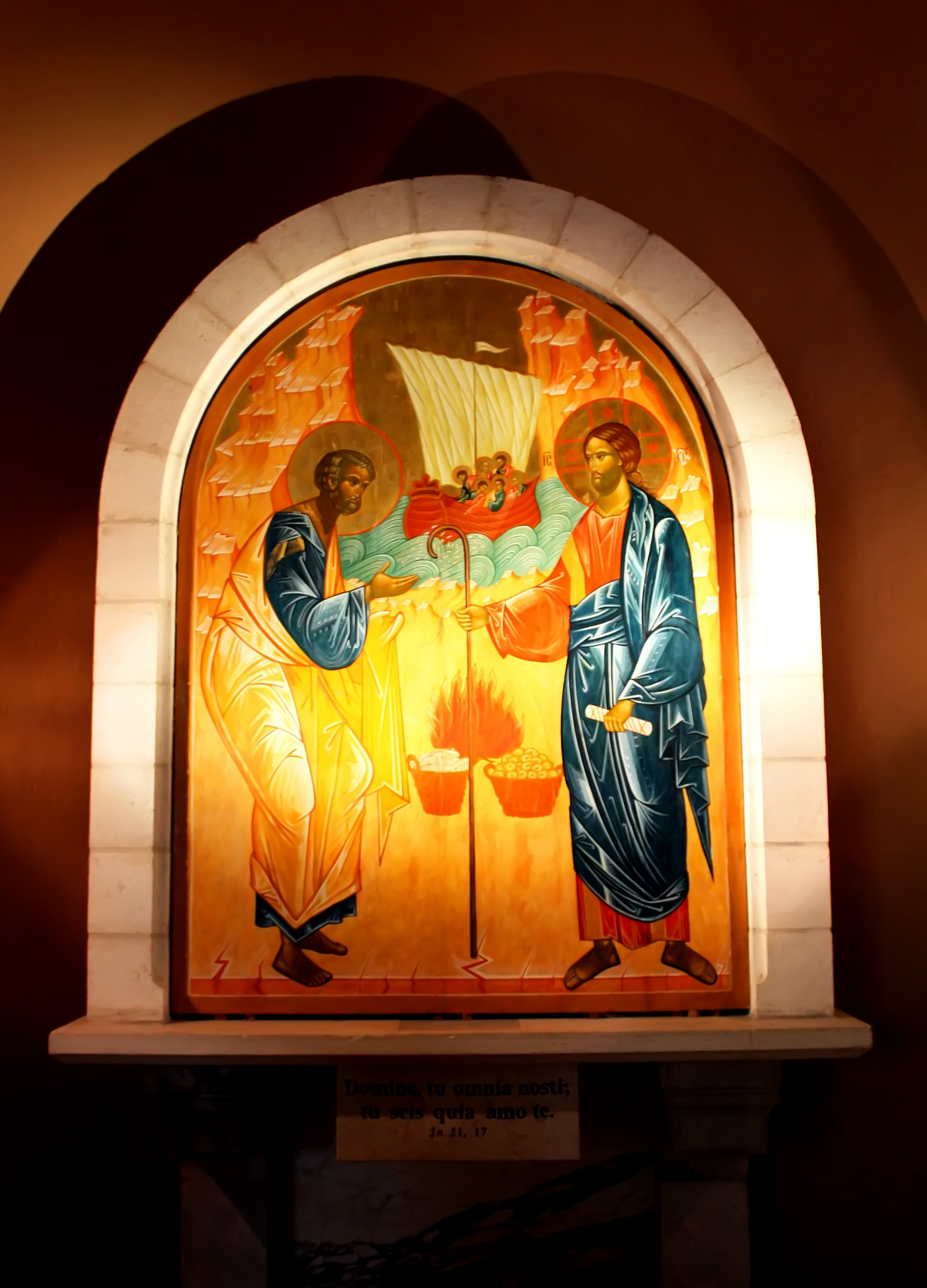
Art of Jesus and Peter

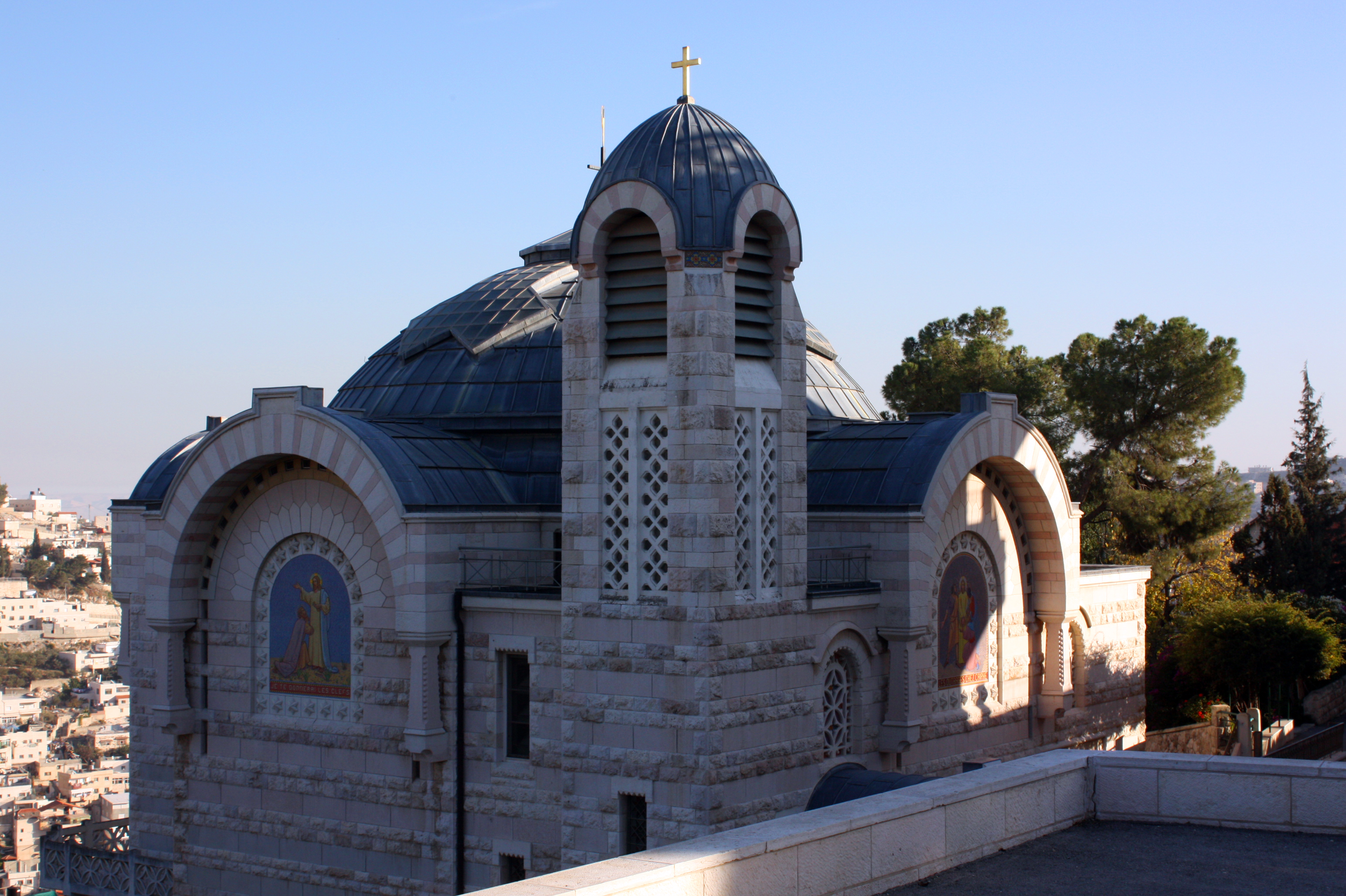
Church (corner view)

== See also ==
- Christianity in Israel
- Oubliette or bottle dungeon, mediaeval prison cell of the type alleged to have been used at this location
