= List of late medieval works on the Crusades =

The list of late medieval works on the Crusades provides those contemporaneous written accounts and other artifacts of the Crusades covering Crusades against Christians, the Baltic Crusades, which lasted until 1560, and the later Crusades in the Levant from the fall of Acre in 1291 through the Crusade of King Sebastian in 1578. The scope of these expeditions is provided in List of Crusades. These sources include chronicles, criticisms, personal accounts and official documents. Some of these works cover timeframes that overlap the other articles in the series Historians and histories of the Crusades. As such, these lists support the medieval historiography of the Crusades.

A number of 17th through 19th century historians published numerous collections of original sources of the Crusades. These include Recueil des historiens des croisades (RHC), Monumenta Germaniae Historica (MGH), Revue de l'Orient Latin/Archives de l’Orient Latin (ROL/AOL) and the Rolls Series. Other collections are of interest to the Crusader period include Recueil des historiens des Gaules et de la France (RHF), Rerum Italicarum scriptores (RISc), Patrologia Latina (MPL), Patrologia Graeco-Latina (MPG), Patrologia Orientalis (PO), Corpus Scriptorum Christianorum Orientalium (CSCO) and Palestine Pilgrims' Text Society (PPTS).

Modern reference material to these sources include Encyclopædia Britannica Eleventh Edition, Oxford Dictionary of Byzantium, Dictionary of National Biography, Neue Deutsche Biographie, Oxford Dictionary of the Christian Church, Oxford Dictionary of the Middle Ages, Catholic Encyclopedia, Encyclopedia of the Medieval Chronicle, Encyclopædia Iranica, Encyclopædia Islamica and Encyclopaedia of Islam. Contemporary histories include the three-volume A History of the Crusades (1951–1954) by Steven Runciman; the Wisconsin collaborative study A History of the Crusades (1969–1989) edited by Kenneth M. Setton, particularly the Select Bibliography by Hans E. Mayer; Fordham University's Internet Medieval Sourcebook; and The Crusades: An Encyclopedia, edited by Alan V. Murray.

== Thirteenth century ==
The first of the Crusades against Christians was the Albigensian Crusade of 1209–1229, begun under Philip II of France and continued with Louis IX of France. After the fall of Acre in 1291, there was a significant push for a new Crusade to retake the Holy Land. Histories written after that time have typically combined a chronology with proposals for additional Crusades. This period also saw the rise of knighthood and the notion of chivalry.

William of Tudela. William of Tudela (fl. 1199 – 1214), also known as Guillaume de Tudèle, a poet who wrote in Old Occitan of the Albigensian Crusade.

- Canso de la Crozada or Song of the Albigensian Crusade (13th century). Translation by Janet Shirley in Crusade Texts in Translation, Volume 2.

Carmen de expugnatione Salaciae. The Carmen de expugnatione Salaciae (Song of the Conquest of Alcácer do Sal) is a Latin epic poem in 115 elegiac couplets describing the siege of Alcácer do Sal in 1217. It was written by Goswin of Bossut (died 1238) for Soeiro Viegas, bishop of Lisbon.

Primat of Saint-Denis. Primat of Saint-Denis (died between 1277 and 1285), a Benedictine monk and historian.

- Roman des rois (1274). The Roman des rois (Romance of Kings) was written in Old French and provides a detailed account of the reign of Louis IX of France. Roman des rois was the earliest version of the Grandes Chroniques de France.
- La Chronique (after 1335). Latin version of Roman des rois covering only the years 1248–1277. Transcribed by French monk and translator Jean de Vignay.

David of Ashby. David of Ashby (fl. 1260 – 1275), an English-born Dominican friar who was sent from Acre to the Mongol ruler Hulagu in 1260,

- Les fais des Tatars (The facts about the Tartars) (c. 1275). Description of the culture of the Tatars and their military organization and discipline.

La Devise des Chemins de Babiloine. An anonymous account detailing the strengths of Mamluk armies in Egypt and Syria and gave mileages of the various routes between Cairo and the Delta ports. Prepared as an intelligence report in preparation for a future Crusade to be launched against Mamluk Cairo.

- La Devise des Chemins de Babiloine (1289–1291). In Itinéraires à Jérusalem et descriptions de la Terre Sainte...(1882) by French historian Henri-Victor Michelant.
- The Devise des Chemins de Babilione redated (1994). By British historian Robert Irwin. In The Military Orders, Volume I: Fighting for the Faith and Caring for the Sick, edited by British medieval historian Malcolm Barber.

Livonian Rhymed Chronicle. The Livonian Rhymed Chronicle is a chronicle written in Middle High German by an anonymous author. It covers the period 1180–1290 of the Northern Crusades and contains a wealth of detail about Livonia.

Fidentius of Padua. Fidentius of Padua (before 1226 – after 1291), a Franciscan friar and historian.

- Liber recuperations Terre Sancte (1291). A history of the Holy Land and approaches to retaking the Kingdom of Jerusalem, delivered to pope Nicholas IV. Liber also included an adverse biography of Muhammad. In Biblioteca bio-bibliografica della Terra Santa e dell'Oriente francescano, Volume 2, edited by Girolamo Golubovich.

William of Tripoli. William of Tripoli (fl. 1254–1273), a Dominican friar active as a missionary and papal nuncio in the Holy Land. He wrote two works about Islam, towards which he displayed an unusually irenic attitude for his time.

- Notitia de Machometo (Information concerning Muḥammad) (1271), written for the future Gregory X after the failure of the Eighth Crusade. It served to describe who Muḥammad was and the early Muslim conquests; to describe the Qurʾān, its origin and author or compiler; and to describe the teachings of the Qurʾān and what it says about Christianity. It also describes the Islamic world, the caliphates and certain Islamic practices.
- De statu Saracenorum (On the Realm of the Saracens) (1273), continues Notitia de Machometo and discusses conversion of Muslims, it has been called a handbook for the Christian missionary on the history, law and beliefs of Islam. It may have been written in response to Gregory's papal bull Dudum super generalis of 11 March 1273.

Thaddeus of Naples. Thaddeus of Naples (fl. 1291), an Italian magister.

- Hystoria de desolacione civitatis Acconensis (1292). A history based on eyewitness accounts of the fall of Acre of 1291, embroidered by accusations of widespread cowardice. His violent language was intentional, and the object was to shame the West into launching a new Crusade. The work ended with an appeal to the Pope, to the princes, and to the faithful to rescue the Holy Land as the Christians' heritage
- Hystoria de desolacione et conculcacione civitatis Acconensis et tocius Terre Sancte, in A. D. 1291 (1874). Edited by Comte Paul E. D. Riant.

Jacques Bretel. Jacques Bretel (fl. 1285), a French-language trouvère.

- Le Tournoi de Chauvency, 2 volumes (1 + supplement) (1285). A poem concerning the Tournament of Chauvency. Held in 1285 by Louis V, Count of Chiny, the famed tournament brought together nearly 500 knights from around Europe. Participants included Rudolf I of Germany, Frederick III, Duke of Lorraine and Guy of Dampierre, Count of Flanders. A modern, however fanciful, description of the tournament can be found in The Reign of Chivalry by British historian Richard Barber.
- Roman de Castelain de Couci et de la dame de Fayel (13th century). A romantic poem using the cœur mangémotif, sometimes attributed to the 13th-century trouvère Jakemés.

Humbert of Romans. Humbert of Romans (c. 1190 – 1277) served as the fifth Master General of the Order of Preachers from 1254 to 1263.

- Opus tripartitum (1274). One of a number of texts by leading intellectuals commissioned by Gregory X to be presented at the Second Council of Lyon in 1274. This document defended church reform, promoted the philosophy of crusades, discussed the relationship of the Church to Arabs, analyzed the causes and effects of the Greek Schism, proposed ways to go about the re-establishment of Christian unity between the two wings of Christianity, and promoted the mission to the heathens.

Galvano of Levanti. Galvano of Levanti (fl. late 13th century), a physician in the papal court of Boniface VIII (1294–1303) and a propagandist.

- Liber Sancti Passagii Christocolarum contra Saracenos pro recuperatione Terra Sanctae (1295). A work dedicated to Philip IV of France that called for a new Crusade. Galvano was influenced by Thaddeus of Naples' account of the fall of Acre.

Guibert of Tournai. Guibert of Tournai (c. 1200 – 1284), a French Franciscan friar, known for his sermons and other writings.

- Collectio de Scandalis Ecclesiae (after 1272), a report to Gregory X on the failures of the Eighth Crusade and Lord Edward's Crusade.

Ramon Lull. Ramon Lull (1232/1236–1315), also known as Raymond Lully or Ramon Llull, a Spanish missionary to the Arab world. Lull was stoned to death in Tunisia in 1315.

- Le Libre del Orde de Cauayleria (1279–1283). Lull's account of the order of chivalry is translated to The book of the Ordre of chyualry, by English writer William Caxton (c. 1422 – c. 1491) and appears as Volume 168 of the Early English Text Society (EETS).
- Petitio pro recuperatione Terrae Sanctae (1295). A document presented to pope Boniface VIII (1294–1303) proposing a new Crusade and the combining the military orders into a single organization. This was a follow-up to Petitio Raymundi pro conversione infidelium (1294) presented to pope Celestine V (1294).
- Liber de Fine (1305). An elaboration of Petitio pro recuperatione Terrae Sanctae.
- Raymundi Lulli Opera (1598). Edited by Heinrich C. A. von Nettesheim.
- Raimond Lulle, in Histoire littéraire de la France, Tome XXIX (1895). A biographical account edited by French historian Jean-Barthélemy Hauréau.
- Le Bienheureux Raymond Lulle (1232-1315) (1900). A biography by French historian Marius André (1868–1927).

Bruno von Schauenburg. Bruno von Schauenburg (1205–1281), a nobleman and bishop of Olomouc in from 1245 to 1281. He wrote a report to Gregory X that spoke of scandals in the Church and called for a strong emperor, namely his benefactor, Ottokar II of Bohemia. He argued that Crusades to the East were now pointless and should instead be directed against the heathens on the eastern frontiers of the Empire.

Guillaume de Nangis. Guillaume de Nangis (died 1300), a French chronicler and biographer, particularly of Louis IX of France and Philip III of France.

- Chronicon (1300). A chronicle of the history of the world from the Creation until 1300. For the period before 1113, the work is that of the medieval author Sigebert of Gembloux (1030–1112) among others. It also borrows from La Chronique by Benedictine monk and historian Primat of Saint-Denis. A continuation to 1368 was done by Prior Jean de Venette.
- Vie et vertus de Saint Louis d'après Guillaume de Nangis et le confesseur de la reine Marguerite (1877). A version of Nangis' Vie et vertus de Saint Louis, edited by French historian René de Lespinasse.
- Mémoire sur les ouvrages de Guillaume de Nangis (1873). A commentary on the works of Nangis by French historian Léopold V. Delisle.

Pierre Dubois. Pierre Dubois (1255–1321), a French publicist and propagandist.

- De Recuperatione Terre Sancte (1304). A work proposing the recovery of the Holy Land using the wealth of the Knights Templar and Knights Hospitaller.

Hayton of Corycus. Hayton of Corycus (1240–1310/1320), also known as Hethum of Gorigos, an Armenian noble and historian.

- La Flor des estoires de la terre d'Orient (1307). The Flower of the Histories of the East is found in RHC Documents arméniens (1869–1906), Volume 2.II, and concerns the Muslim conquests and Mongol invasion. It contains a summary of Levantine history, together with a discussion of the state of the Mamluk Sultanate. Hayton proposed a double expedition and co-operation with the Armenians and the Mongols.
- Table Chronologique des Evénement en Syrie, Palestine et Arménie de 1076 à 1307 (1307). In RHC Documents arméniens (1869–1906).

Jacques de Molay. Jacques de Molay (1240–1314), last Grand Master of the Knights Templar.

- Report to Clement V (1306). A report to pope Clement V recommending against the merging of the Templars and Hospitallers. Reprinted in Étienne Baluze's Vitae Paparum Avenionensium.

Guillaume Adam. Guillaume Adam (died 1341), a missionary to and later archbishop of Soltaniyeh, Persia.

- De modo Sarracenos extirpandi (1316–1317). An account detailing his approach for the West to defeat the Byzantine empire and the Ilkhanids.
- Directorium ad passagium faciendum (1330). A treatise that proposed a crusade, presented to Philip VI of France (1328–1350), that may have been written by G. Adam. In RHC Documents arméniens, Volume 2.IV.

Guy of Warwick. Guy of Warwick (Gui de Warewic), a legendary English hero popular in England and France from the thirteenth to seventeenth centuries. He is reputed to have made a pilgrimage to the Holy Land and is erroneously regarded as real in some fifteenth-century chronicles, including that by English historian John Rous.

- Guy of Warwick: a knight of Britain who in his day did many deeds of prowess's (1525).
- Fragments of an early fourteenth-century Guy of Warwick.
- The noble and renowned history of Guy, earl of Warwick (1829). Containing a full and true account of his many famous and valiant actions, and renowned victories.

== Fourteenth century ==
The Crusaders maintained a presence in the Holy Land until the fall of Ruad in 1302 and much of the historical work was then concentrated on the Kingdom of Cyprus, the military orders and the Mongol invasion of Europe, and renewed plans for a new Crusade to retake Jerusalem. Significant portions of the Recueil des historiens des croisades (RHC), Palestine Pilgrims' Text Society (PPTS) library and Francesco Gabrieli's Arab historians of the Crusades are devoted to works from the 14th century.

Gérard de Monréal. Gérard de Monréal (fl. 1314–1321), secretary to Guillaume de Beaujeu, Grand Master of the Knights Templar from 1273 to 1291. Monréal is believed to have written the later part of Les Gestes des Chiprois (Deeds of the Cypriots), an Old French chronicle of the history of the Crusader states and Kingdom of Cyprus between 1132 and 1311.

- Les Gestes des Chiprois, 3 parts in 1 volume (1314–1321). A history of the Crusades in three parts: (1) Chronique de Terre Sainte (anonymous author) covering the period from 1131–1222; (2) History of the War between the Emperor Frederick and Sir John of Ibelin, covering the period 1223–1242, by Italian historian Philip of Novara (1200–1270); (3) Chronique du Templier de Tir, covering the Crusades through 1311. The work includes one of only two eyewitness accounts of the fall of Acre in 1291 and the trial of the Knights Templar in 1311.
- Les gestes des Chiprois: recueil de chroniques françaises écrites en Orient au XIIIe & XVIe siècles (1887). Translation for the Société de l'Orient latin by French historian and philologist Gaston Raynaud (1850–1911). Raynaud's version of Les gestes des Chiprois is found in both RHC Documents arméniens (1869–1906), Volume 2.VI, and Revue de l'Orient Latin (ROL), Volumes XIIIe, XIVe.

Jean de Joinville. Jean de Joinville (1224–1317), a French chronicler who accompanied Louis IX of France on the Seventh Crusade and Eighth Crusade who wrote his influential biography.

- Life of Saint Louis (1309), a biography of Louis IX, relying on the Grandes Chroniques de France for events after 1254. Joinville was with Louis during his captivity by the Egyptians in 1250 after the battle of al-Mansurah. Reprinted in Bohn's Libraries.
- Memoirs of the Crusades (1955). Translation by British biographer Frank Thomas Marzials (1840–1912). Consists of the chronicle De la Conquête de Constantinople of Geoffrey of Villehardouin and Joinville's Life of Saint Louis.

Rashid-al-Din. Rashid-al-Din Hamadani (1247–1318), a Jewish-turned-Islamic physician and historian who was vizier to the Ilkhan Ghazan.

- Jāmiʿ al-Tawārīkh (Compendium of Chronicles) is a history of the Mongols from the time of Adam until 1311. The books include History of the Mongols, regarding the Khanate conquests from Genghis Khan through that of Ghazan. They also include the History of the Franks through 1305, based on sources such as Italian explorer Isol the Pisan (fl. 1300) and the Chronicon pontificum et imperatorum of Martin of Opava. The third part of geography has been lost.
- A Compendium of Chronicles: Rashid al-Din's Illustrated History of the World (1995). Edition by American art historian Sheila Blair.

Foulques de Villaret. Foulques de Villaret (died 1327), Grand Master of the Knights Hospitaller from 1305 to 1319.

- La Devise des Chemins de Babiloine (1306–1307). A document prepared for Foulques de Villaret providing an assessment of Mamluk forces, as research for a possible invasion. When the document was written in 1306–1307, al-Nasir Muhammad was the sultan of Egypt and Syria.
- Mémoire de Foulques de Villaret sur la croisade (1312). At the time of the Council of Vienne in 1311-1312, Foulques wrote to Philip IV of France of the Hospitaller's preparation for any future crusade.

Ferdinand IV of Castile. Ferdinand IV of Castile (1285–1312), known as the Summoned (el Emplazado), was King of Castile and León from 1295 to 1312. He continued the Reconquista and, although he failed to conquer Algeciras in 1309, he captured the city of Gibraltar that same year, and in 1312 the city of Alcaudete was also conquered.

- Memorias de D. Fernando IV de Castilla (1312). Translated by Antonio de Benavides.

Rawḍ al-Qirṭās. Rawḍ al-Qirṭās is a book that describes he rulers of the Maghreb, and a local history of the city of Fez. The scope of the history is from the advent of Idris I in 788 to the Marinid Dynasty up to 1326.

Peter of Dusburg. Peter of Dusburg (died after 1326), a German historian and chronicler of the Teutonic Knights.

- Chronicon terrae Prussiae (1326). A chronicle of the Teutonic Order and their role in the Northern Crusades.

Jean de Vignay. Jean de Vignay (c. 1282/1285 – c. 1350), a French monk and translator.

- De la chose de la chevalerie. On the Matter of Chivalry, a translation of De re militari of Roman writer Vegetius(fl. fourth century).
- Les merveilles de la Terre d'Outremer (after 1331). A translation of the Descriptio orientalium partium of Franciscan pilgrim Odoric of Pordenone (1286–1331).
- Le Miroir historial (1333). A translation of the Speculum historiale of French Dominican Vincent of Beauvais (c. 1184/1194 – c. 1264).
- La Légende dorée (1333 or 1334), a translation of the Legenda aurea (Golden Legends) of Italian chronicler Jacobus de Voragine (c. 1230 – 1298).
- La Chronique (after 1335). Latin version of Roman des rois by Benedictine monk and historian Primat of Saint-Denis (died between 1277–1285), a detailed account of the reign of Louis IX of France.

Ludolf von Sudheim. Ludolf von Sudheim (fl. 1340), also known as Ludolf of Suchem, a traveler to the Holy Land from 1336 to 1341.

- De Terra sancta et itinere Iherosolomitano et de statu eius et aliis mirabilibus, que in mari conspiciuntur, videlicet mediterraneo (1350). English translation, Description of the Holy Land, and of the Way Thither, edited by Aubrey Stewart (1844–1918). Work documenting the fall of the Crusader states. In Palestine Pilgrims' Text Society (PPTS), Volume XII.3.

John VI Kantakouzenos. John VI Kantakouzenos (1292-1383), was Byzantine emperor from 1347 to 1354.

- Historia (after 1341) that includes an account of Godfrey of Bouillon's arrival in Constantinople in 1096, in Corpus Scriptorum Historiae Byzantinae (CSHB) Volumes 5-7.
- Against Mohammedanism (after 1341). In Historia.

Hamd-Allah Mustawfi. Hamd-Allah Mustawfi (1281-1349), a Persian historian and geographer. Also known as Hamd-Allah Mustawfi Qazvini.

- Ḏayl-e Tāriḵ-e gozida (after 1329). A compendium of world history from Creation until 1329, dedicated to the son of Rashid-al-Din Hamadani.
- Nozhat al-qolub (1340). A work on geography that may be derived from Rashid-al-Din's lost work.
- Histoire des Seldjoukides et des Ismaéliens ou assassins de l'Iran (1849). Extracts from Ḏayl-e Tāriḵ-e gozida,translated by Charles Defrémery (1822–1883). A history of Persia under the Seljuk dynasty and the Assassins. The Seljuks originated in 985, with the sultans beginning with Tughril (1039–1063) and ending with Toghril III(1174–1194). The Assassins began under Hassan-i Sabbah (1050–1124) and were eradicated by the Mongols in 1256.

Younger Livonian Rhymed Chronicle. The Younger Livonian Rhymed Chronicle was written in Low German by the chaplain of the Master of the Livonian Order, around the end of the 1340s. It is this chronicle that narrates how Estonians slaughtered their own nobility and called the Livonian Order to Estonia, which, in turn, butchered them, on 1343.

Kitāb al-Rawḍ al-Miʿṭār. Kitāb al-Rawḍ al-miʿṭār fi khabar al-aqṭār (The Book of the Fragrant Garden) is a fourteenth-century Arabic geography by al-Ḥimyarī that is a primary source for the history of Muslim Iberia in the Middle Ages, based in part on the earlier account by Muhammad al-Idrisi.

Geoffroi de Charny. Geoffroi de Charny (1300–1356), a French knight and author. De Charny and his wife are the first recorded owners of the Shroud of Turin, lost after the sack of Constantinople in 1204.

- Book of Chivalry (Livre de chevalerie) (c. 1350). A treatise intended to explain the appropriate qualities for a knight, reform the behavior of the fighting classes, and defend the chivalric ethos against its critics, mainly in clerical circles.

Guillaume de Machaut. Guillaume de Machaut (1300–1377), an influential French poet and composer.

- La Prise d'Alexandre (after 1369). An account of the campaign of Peter I of Cyprus, titular king of Jerusalem, against Egypt during the Alexandrian Crusade of 1365. The edition of 1887 was edited by French historian Louis de Mas Latrie (1815–1897)

Birgitta Birgersdotter. Birgitta Birgersdotter (1303–1373), also known as Saint Bridget of Sweden, was a Swedish mystic and founder of the Birgittine Order who persuaded Magnus IV Eriksson of Sweden to launch a crusade against Russia.

- Revelations of St. Birgitta (before 1378). Her revelations were written down by her confessors, and later translated from Swedish into Latin and revised in 1378 by Alfonso Pecha de Vadaterra, bishop of Jaén (1359–1368).

Informatio ex parte Nunciorum Regis Cypri. Informatio ex parte Nunciorum Regis Cypri is an anonymously written history of Cyprus through the 14th century including an account of Henry II of Cyprus, the last crowned king of Jerusalem, and his plans to retake the Holy Land from the Mongols. It is included in Documents and Histoire de l'île de Chypre sous le règne des princes de la maison de Lusignan by French historian Louis de Mas Latrie.

Ibn al-Furat. Ibn al-Furat (1334–1405), an Egyptian historian.

- Taʾrīkh al-duwal wa 'l-mulūk (History of the Dynasties and Kingdoms), 11 volumes (15th century). A universal history for which only the portions after 1106 were completed.
- Negotiations with Hugh III, King of Jerusalem and Cyprus. Material concerning Hugh III of Cyprus, excerpted and translated from Taʾrīkh al-duwal wa 'l-mulūk.

Nicephorus Gregoras. Nicephorus Gregoras (1295–1360), a Byzantine theologian and historian.

- Byzantine History (Histoire de Byzance), 37 volumes (after 1359). A history covering the years 1204–1359, continuing the work of Greek historian Georgius Pachymeres (1242 – c. 1310). In RHC Historiens grecs (1875–1881), Volume 1.V, and Patrologia Graeco-Latina (MPG), Volumes 148 (Books 1–24) and 149 (Books 25–37).

Guillaume Durand. Guillaume Durand (1267–1328/1330) was bishop of Mende. Durand was sent as an embassy by pope John XXII and Charles IV of France to the Ottoman sultan Orhan (1326–1360) in order to obtain more favourable conditions for the Latins in Syria.

- De modo celebrandi concilii et corruptelis, 3 volumes (1311). Written for pope Clement V, who later issued papal bull Vox in excelso.
- Informatio brevis de Passagio futuro (1312). A treatise on a possible Crusade to the Holy Land. In Histoire littéraire de la France, Tome XXXV.

Jean Dardel. Jean Dardel (fl. 1375–1383), a French friar who was an advisor to Leo V of Armenia.

- Chronique d'Arménie. A chronicle of Armenian history that covers through the 14th century. In RHC Documents arméniens (1906), Volume 2.I.

Eustache Deschamps. Eustache Deschamps (1346–1407), a French poet.

- Deschamps' Poems and the Crusade. In The Crusade of Nicopolis (1934) by Egyptian Coptologist Aziz S. Atiya.

Nicephoros Callistus. Nicephoros Callistus (Nikephoros Kallistos Xanthopoulos) (c. 1256 – c. 1335), a Greek ecclesiastical historian.

- Historia Ecclesiastica, 18 books (c. 1330). A history down to 610, heavily dependent on his predecessors including Eusebius and Socrates.
- Lists of the emperors and patriarchs of Constantinople (date unknown)
- Poem on the capture of Jerusalem in 1187 (date unknown).

Ibn Khaldūn. 'Abd al-Raḥmār ibn Khaldūn (before 1337 – 1406), an Arab scholar of Islam, social scientist and historian, who has been described as the father of the modern discipline of historiography.

- Kitāb al-‘Ibar, 7 volumes (1337), Book of Lessons, Record of Beginnings and Events in the History of the Arabs and the Berbers and Their Powerful Contemporaries. Includes three parts: al-Muqaddimah (Prolegomena), a universal history of empires; A world history of events up to 1337; and Historiography of works from Arabic Africa.

Al-Nuwayrī. Muḥammad ibn al-Ḳāsim al-Nuwayrī al-Iskandarānī al-Māliki (fl. 1365–1373) also known as al-Nuwayrī, a Muslim historian from Alexandria, Egypt. Eyewitness to the Alexandrian Crusade of 1365.

- Kitāb al-Ilmām fīmā jarat bihi ʾl-aḥkām al-maḳḍiyya fī wāḳiʿat al-Iskandariyya, 6 volumes (between 1365–1374). A history of the city from the time of Alexander the Great and Aristotle through the Alexandrian Crusade and as late as 1374. Edited by Coptic historian Aziz S. Atiya and Swiss Egyptologist Étienne Combe in an edition published in 7 volumes (1968–1976).

Hafiz-i Abru. Hafiz-i Abru (died 1430), a Persian historian working at the courts of Timurid rulers of Central Asia.

- Majma al-tawarikh (World Histories) covering the history and geography of the Timurid state and adjacent regions, commissioned by Shah Rukh. Includes Barkiaruq, the Seljuk ruler during the First Crusade.

Leontios Machairas. Leontios Machairas (1360/1380 – after 1432), a Cypriot historian.

- Kronika (Chronicle) covering the history of Cyprus from the visit of Saint Helen in the late third century until 1432.
- Recital Concerning the Sweet Land of Cyprus, entitled Chronicle, English translation of Kronika by British archaeologist Richard M. Dawkins (1871–1955).
- The nature of the Cypriot chronicle of Leontios Makhairas (1945). Account by Richard M. Dawkins.

Badr al-Din al-Ayni. Badr al-Din al-Ayni (1360–1453), known as al-Aini, was an Arab Islamic scholar.

- 'Iqd al-Jūman fī Ta'rikh Ahl al-Zamán. Original Arabic version of Perles d'Historie.
- Perles d'Historie (The Necklace of Pearls), covering the Ayyubid and Mamluk sultanates from 1226, with most of the early work derived from previous histories. Full title: TheNecklace of Pearls concerning the History of the Peoples of the Time. In RHC Historiens orientaux, Volume 2.1.

Al-Makrizi. Al-Makrizi (1364–1442), an Egyptian historian, also known as al-Maqrisi, descended from the Fatimids. Wrote extensively on the caliphates and sultanates that ruled the country. Some of his material appears to be based on the works of ibn Muyessar and ibn Abd al-Zahir.

- Al-Mawāʻiẓ wa-al-Iʻtibār bi-Dhikr al-Khiṭaṭ wa-al-āthār, 2 volumes. French translation b Egyptoligist Urbain Bouriant as Description topographique et historique de l'Égypte, published from 1895–1900.
- Abhandlung über die in Aegypten eingewanderten arabischen stämme (1847). Translation of Al-Mawāʻiẓ wa-al-Iʻtibār bi-Dhikr al-Khiṭaṭ wa-al-āthār by German orientalist Ferdinand Wüstenfeld.
- History of the Ayyubit and Mameluke Rulers, 2 volumes (1837–1845). Translation by French orientalist Etienne Marc Quatremère.
- Muqaffa. The first sixteen-volumes of an Egyptian biographic encyclopedia. Egyptian historian al-Sakhawiestimated that the complete work would require eighty volumes.

Philippe de Mézières. Philippe de Mézières (c. 1327 – 1405), a French knight and author. De Mézières travelled to Jerusalem and the Cyprus. In 1362, he traveled with Peter I of Cyprus, titular king of Jerusalem, visiting the princes of western Europe in quest of support for a new Crusade.

- Vie de Saint Pierre Thomas (1366). Life of saint Peter Thomas (1305–1366), who participated with de Mézières in the Alexandrian Crusade of 1365.
- Nova religio passionis (1367–1368; revised and enlarged in 1386 and 1396). A proposal for a new order of knighthood. Included in The Crusade of Nicopolis by Aziz Suryal Atiya.
- Description de deux manuscrits contenant la règle de la Militia passionis Jhesu Christi de Philippe de Mézières(1881). A description of two works of de Mézières, by French historian Auguste Molinier.
- Philippe de Mézièves et la croisade au XIVe siècle (1896), by Romanian historian Nicolae Iorga. Recounts the Crusade of Amadeus VI of Savoy (1366–1367). In Bibliothèque de l'École des hautes études. Sciences historiques et philologiques, Fascicule 110.

Jean Froissart. Jean Froissart (c. 1337 – c. 1405), a Belgian medieval author and court historian.

- Chronicles of England, France, and the Adjoining Countries, 5 volumes (c. 1400). Known as Froissart's Chronicles. From the latter part of the reign of Edward II to the coronation of Henry IV. Edition translated from the best French editions, with variations and additions from many celebrated manuscripts, edited by Jean-Baptiste de La Curne de Sainte-Palaye and Thomas Johnes.

== Fifteenth century ==
The fifteenth-century historical works on the Crusades saw the beginning of anti-Islam sentiments in Western works, with calls for a new crusade (e.g., Jean Germain's works) as well as propaganda by both Christian and Islamic writers. There were also accounts of conflicts of the Military Orders with the Turks, continued travel accounts, and regional chronologies. Several works from the Recueil des historiens des croisades (RHC), including Western, Arabic, and Greek works, can be found here. The first attempts at histories of the Crusades were made through the Itinerario di la Gran Militia and Benedetto Accolt's De Bello a Christianis contra Barbaros...

Juan de Segovia. Juan de Segovia (1395–1458) was a Castillan theologian who translated the Koran into Latin with the assistance of Islamic scholar ʿĪsā ibn Jābir.

- De mittendo gladio in Saracenos (c. 1475), a refutation of the Koran.
- Correspondence with Jean Germain and German philosopher Nicola de Cusa (1401–1464) on the dangers of Islam.

Jean Germain. Jean Germain (1400–1461), bishop of Nevers from 1430 to 1436 and bishop of Châlons from 1436 to 1461. Councilor to Philip the Good and chancellor to the Order of the Golden Fleece. (cf. French Wikipedia, Jean Germain)

- Mappemonde spirituelle (1449), a geographical work that plotted the history of Christian martyrs.
- Discours du voyage d'Oultremer (1451), a call to Charles VII of France for a new Crusade. Edited by French historian Charles Schefer in Revue de l'Orient Latin (ROL), Tome 3.
- Le Debat du Crestien et du Sarrasin (1450), a refutation of Islam with a debate between a Christian and a Muslim at the court of a sultan.
- Correspondence with Juan de Segovia and Nicola de Cusa on the dangers of Islam.
- Liber de Virtutibus Philippi Burgundiae et Bradantiae Ducis (1452).
- Situating Islamdom in Jean Germain's Mappemonde Spirituelle (2007). Analysis by David J. Wrisley.

Abu'l-Mahāsin. Abu'l-Mahāsin Yūsuf (1411–1469), an Arabic historian who was a student of Egyptian historian al-Makrizi (1364–1442).

- Anecdotes and good habits of the life of the Sultan Youssof. A biography of Saladin. In RHC Historiens orientaux, Volume 3.
- Nodjoum az-Zahireh is extracted in RHC Historiens orientaux and covers the years 1098–1157 although his chronology differs from the more accepted one of ibn al-Athir. Abu'l Mahāsin and ibn al-Athir both offer accounts of the expeditions of emperor Basil II to Syria in the late tenth century.

Enguerrand de Monstrelet. Enguerrand de Monstrelet (c. 1400–1453), a French chronicler who was present at the 1430 interrogation of Joan of Arc.

- La chronique d'Enguerran de Monstrelet: en deux livres, avec pièces justificatives 1400-1444, 6 volumes (15th century).
- The Chronicles of Enguerrand de Monstrelet, 4 volumes (1809). Containing an account of the cruel civil wars between the houses of Orleans and Burgundy; of the Possession of Paris and Normandy by the English; their expulsion thence; and of other memorable events that happened in the kingdom of France, as well as in other countries. Beginning in the year 1400, where that of Sir John Froissart finishes, and ending at the year 1467, and continued by others to the year 1516. Translated and edited by Thomas Johnes.

Itinerario di la Gran Militia. Itinerario di la Gran Militia, a la Pavese (Itinerary of the Great Army, in Pavese) is an anonymous fifteenth-century work on the First Crusade based on the work of William of Tyre. In RHC Historiensoccidentaux, Volume 5.XIII.

Benedetto Accolti. Benedetto Accolti (1415–1464), also known as Benedict Aretini Accolti, an Italian historian. His primary work was the first attempt at a history of the Crusades, concentrating on the First Crusade and the heroic role of Godfrey of Bouillon. The work was written to encourage support to pope Pius II for a new Crusade to the Holy Land and is regarded as propaganda.

- Dialogue (1461–1463). A work favorably comparing the achievements of the ancients to those of modern (15th century) times.
- De Bello a Christianis contra Barbaros gesto pro Christi Sepulchro et Judaea recuperandis libri IV (1464) (On the War carried on by the Christians against the Barbarians, for the Recovery of Christ's Sepulchre, and of Judea). With Leonardo Accolti. Edition in 1623 edited by Scottish historian Thomas Dempster. Published in RHC Historiens occidentaux, Volume 5.XI.

Grandes Chroniques de France. Grandes Chroniques de France, 6 volumes (1461). A compilation of the history of France produced between the 13th and 15th centuries by the monks of Saint-Denis. The original work, Roman des roisby a Benedictine monk and historian Primat of Saint-Denis (died between 1277 and 1285), traced the kings of the Franks from the origins until the death of Philip II of France in 1223 and extended at a later date to the death of Charles V of France in 1380. The edition by French philologist Alexis Paulin Paris was published 1836–1840.

Novgorod Chronicle. The Novgorod First Chronicle, also known as the Chronicle of Novgorod, 1016–1471 is the most ancient extant Old Russian chronicle of the Novgorodian Rus'.

Doukas. Doukas (c. 1400 – 1470), a Byzantine historian who flourished under Constantine XI Palaiologos.

- Historia byzantina (15th century). Volume 20 of Corpus Scriptorum Historæ Byzantinæ (CSHB), edited by German philologist August I. Bekker.
- Decline and fall of Byzantium to the Ottoman Turks (1975). Translation of Historia byzantina by H. J. Magoulias.

William Caxton. William Caxton (c. 1422 – c. 1491) was an English merchant, diplomat, and writer, introducing the printing press into England, in 1476, and the first English retailer of printed books.

- Godeffroy of Boloyne: The siege and conqueste of Jerusalem (1893). By William of Tyre (c. 1130 – 1186). Translated by W. Caxton and edited from the copy in the British museum, with introduction, notes, vocabulary, and indexes, by Mary Noyes Colvin. Taken from a French translation of William's Historia rerum in partibus transmarinis gestarum (History of Deeds Done Beyond the Sea). In Early English Text Society, Extra series, Volume 64.
- The book of the Ordre of chyualry (1926). Translated and printed by W. Caxton from a French version of Ramón Lull's Le libre del orde de cauayleria, together with Adam Loutfut's Scottish transcript (Harleian ms. 6149), edited by Alfred T. P. Byles. Published for Early English Text Society, Original series, 168

Sébastien Mamerot. Sébastien Mamerot (between c. 1418 and 1440 – 1490), a French clergyman, scholar, novelist, and translator.

- Passages d'outremer (1473–1474). A chronicle of the Crusades written in Middle French, drawing on legendary material and covering the wars between Catholics and Muslims from the time of Charlemagne until 1462.

Laonikos Chalkokondyles. Laonikos Chalkokondyles (c. 1430 – c. 1470), a Byzantine Greek historian from Athens.

- Proofs of Histories, 3 volumes (Latin translation, 1556). Also known as Demonstrations of History. Encompasses the last 150 years of the Byzantine empire, covering 1298–1463. In Patrologia Graeco-Latina (MPG) Volume 159 and as Historiarum Libri Decem in Corpus Scriptorum Historiae Byzantinae (CSHB), Volume 10.

Gulielmus Caoursin. Gulielmus Caoursin (1430–1501), vice-chancellor of the Knights Hospitaller. An eye-witness to the siege of Rhodes in 1480, an unsuccessful attack by the Ottoman fleet.

- Obsidionis Rhodiæ urbis descriptio (1480). Caoursin's account of the siege of Rhodes. English translation by English poet John Caius (fl. 1480). Reprinted in Edward Gibbon's The Crusades. Full title: The Delectable Newwesse and Tithynges of the Glorious Victory of the Rhodyans against the Turkes.
- Primordium et origo sacri Xenodochii atque Ordinis militiae Sancti Joannis Baptistae Hospitalariorum Hierosolimitani (1489). In RHC Historiens occidentaux, Volume 5.IX.v.i.
- Le fondement du S. Hospital de l'ordre de la chevalerie de S. Jehan Baptiste de Jerusalem (1493). In RHC Historiens occidentaux, Volume 5.IX.v.ii.
- De terræ motûs labore, quo Rhodii affecti sunt (1496). An account of the earthquake at Rhodes in 1481.
- Oratio in senatu Rhodiorum, de morte Turci, habita pridie Kalendas junias M.CCC.LXXXI (1496). Speech to the senate of Rhodes on the death of Ottoman sultan Mehmed II in 1481.
- Gestorum Rhodiae obsidionis commentarii (1496). Two illuminated manuscripts conserved at the Bibliothèque nationale de France, with 51 miniatures attributed to the maître du Cardinal de Bourbon.
- Hospitaller Piety and Crusader Propaganda (2015). Guillaume Caoursin's description of the Ottoman siege of Rhodes, by Theresa M. Vann and Donald J. Kagay.

Pierre d'Aubusson. Pierre d'Aubusson (1423–1503), Grand Master of the Knights Hospitaller from 1476 to 1503. Commander of the garrison opposing the Turks during the siege of Rhodes in 1480.

- Account of the Siege of Rhodes. Included in The History of the Holy, Military, Sovereign Order of St. John of Jerusalem (1852) by English Hospitaller John Taaffe.
- Histoire de Pierre d'Aubusson (1667) by French Jesuit Dominique Bouhours (1628–1702). The life of the renowned Peter d'Aubusson, grandmaster of Rhodes: Containing those two remarkable sieges of Rhodes by Mahomet the Great, and Solyman the Magnificent. Accounts of the sieges of Rhodes in 1480 and 1522 made by Mehmed II and Suleiman the Magnificent, respectively.

Mīr-Khvānd. Mīr-Khvānd (1433–1498), a Persian-language historian from Bukhara.

- Rawżat aṣ-ṣafāʾ fī sīrat al-anbiyāʾ w-al-mulūk w-al-khulafā (The Gardens of purity in the biography of the prophets and kings and caliph), 7 volumes with geographic index (1497). A history of Islam from its origins until the late fifteenth century. Uses over forty major Arabic and Persian histories.
- Guftār dar bayān-i tạbaqah-i chahārum az Mulūk-i ʻAjam kih īshān-rā Sāsāniyān gūyand. A history of the Sasanian empire
- Histoire des Sassanides. A translation of the Persian text Guftār dar bayān-i...
- The History of the Atábeks of Syria and Persia. Translation of portions of Volume 4 of Rawżat aṣ-ṣafāʾ, edited by English orientalist William H. Morley, with a section on the Coins Struck by the Atábeks of Irak by English antiquary and numismatist William S. W. Vaux (1818 –1885).
- Histoire des sultans du Kharezm. A history of the Khwarazmian dynasty of Persia (1077–1231). Translation by French orientalist Charles Defrémery.

Francesco Amadi. Francesco Amadi (died after 1445), an Italian chronicler.

- Chroniques d'Amadi et de Stromboldi. Covers the Crusades from 1095 and a history of Cyprus through 1441.
- Chroniques d'Amadi. Includes narratives from a number of sources including Estoire d'Eracles, Annales de Terre Sainte and Gestes des Chiprois, along with original material.
- Chroniques de Stromboldi. A French edition of Leontios Machairas' Kronika, translated by Diomède Stromboldi.

John Rous. John Rous (c. 1411 – 1491), an English historian and antiquary.

- The Rous Roll (1485). History of England written during the reign of Richard III of England. Presents a pro-Yorkist version of contemporary English history.
- The Warwick Roll (c. 1485). A family chronicle of the Beauchamp family, concerned mainly with the life of Richard Beauchamp, 13th Earl of Warwick (1382–1439), a contemporary of Rous. Rous embraced the legend of Guy of Warwick, claiming he was an ancestor of the Beauchamps.
- Historia Regum Angliae (after 1485). History of the kings of England through Henry VII of England.

Utrecht Chronicle of the Teutonic Order. The anonymous Utrecht Chronicle of the Teutonic Order, or Jüngere Hochmeisterchronik, was a substantial chronicle on the Teutonic Knights and their role in the Crusades to the Holy Land, written in Dutch.

== See also ==
- Art of the Crusades
- Crusade Texts in Translation
- Crusader States
- Islamic view on the Crusades
- List of Crusader Castles
- Military History of the Crusader States
- Military Orders of the Crusades
- Recovery of the Holy Land
- Travelogues of Palestine
