= List of works about the archaeology, cartography and numismatics of the Crusades =

Historians of the Crusades: archaeology, cartography and numismatics include those authors whose work was in the auxiliary sciences of history, including the areas of archaeological exploration; historical geography and cartography; numismatics and sigillography; and document analysis techniques. Much of this work is based on the accounts of travelers to the Holy Land.

- Archaeological disciplines have contributed to the understanding of the history of the Crusades by verifying or refuting accounts presented in original sources. Particular emphasis has been on Crusader castles, history of the art of the period, and document analysis techniques such as palaeography, diplomatics and epigraphy.
- Historical cartography, geography and topography are sources used in the study of the history of the Crusades. Some of these authors and their works are presented below, supplementing works that are essentially travelers' accounts.
- The disciples of numismatics, the study of coins and other money, and sigillography, the study of seals of Byzantium and the Latin East, play a role in interpreting histories. The coinage of Outremer that has been studied are the coins of the Kingdom of Jerusalem, the Frankish Syria, and those of the Islamic world, including Frankish imitations.

In his article in the Catholic Encyclopedia, French historian Louis R. Bréhier (1869–1951) identified archaeological, cartographical and numismatics sources as a key for historical understanding of the Crusades. Principal authors and their works are identified below. Many of these overlap with historians and travelers discussed in the companion articles in Historians and histories of the Crusades, and many of the works meet multiple categories in the overall work. Related articles include Biblical archaeology, the list of Christian holy places, the study of numismatics, the cartography of Palestine and the cartography of Jerusalem. The travel accounts in the Palestine Pilgrims' Text Society (PPTS) library are also of interest.

== Cartography ==
Early journeys to the Holy Land included pilgrimages and government surveys, and resulted in numerous documents relating to geography and archaeology.

Descriptions of the Holy Land in the 5th and 6th Centuries. Numerous works dating from 440 to 570 describe the geography, topography and buildings in the Holy Land. These include: The Epitome of S. Eucherius (440); The Breviary of Jerusalem (530); Theodosius' De situ terrae sanctae, or Topography of the Holy Land (530); The Buildings of Justinian, by Procopius (500 – after 565); and The Holy Places Visited by Antoninus Martyr (c. 570), the so-called anonymous pilgrim of Piacenza. Both the Breviary and Antoninus Martyr describe the crown of thorns present in a "Basilica of Mount Zion." In PPTS II.1–II.4.

Arculf and Adomnán. Arculf (fl. late 7th century), a Frankish bishop who toured the Holy Land c. 680. Adomnán (c. 624–704) was a Scottish abbot who wrote about the sacred places based on the work of Arculf. The accounts contain the second oldest known map of Jerusalem (the oldest being the Madaba Map). In PPTS III.1.

- Pilgrimage of Arculfus in the Holy Land (about the year A.D. 670).
- De locis sanctis (Concerning Sacred Places), a work by Adomnán based on Arculf's account.

Commemoratorium de Casis Dei vel Monasteriis is a report from 808 sent to Charlemagne tabulating all churches, monasteries and hospices in the Holy Land. Its purpose was to allow the emperor to expeditiously distribute alms. In Descriptiones Terrae Sanctae ex saeculo VIII., IX., XII. et XV (1874) by Titus Tobler.

Ibn Rustah. Ahmad ibn Rustah (died after 903), a Persian explorer and geographer.

- Kitāb al-A'lāq al-Nafīsa (Book of Precious Records). A geographical compendium describing the travels of ibn Rustah to Europe, Russia and Arabia.

Al-Balādhuri. ʾAḥmad ibn Yaḥyā ibn Jabir al-Balādhurī (fl. 9th century), one of the earliest Muslim historians who traveled widely in Syria and Mesopotamia and provided an extensive geographic information on the area.

- Kitāb Futūḥ al-Buldān (The Conquest of Nations), an early history of the Caliphate.

Ibn Jubayr. Ibn Jubayr (1145–1217), an Arab geographer and traveler.

- Al-Rihlah (The Voyage). A travel account which includes his trip to Mecca from 1183 to 1185 and included travel to Egypt and Sicily. In Recueil des historiens des croisades (RHC) Historiens orientaux, Volume 3 (1884).

William of Rubruck. William of Rubruck (fl. 1253 – 1255), a Flemish Franciscan missionary who accompanied Louis IX of France on the Seventh Crusade and, in 1253, set out on a journey to Mongol territory.

- Itinerarium fratris Willielmi de Rubruquis de ordine fratrum Minorum, Galli, Anno gratiae 1253 ad partes Orientales (1255). A report of William's travels, presented to Louis IX in 1255.

Abu'l Fida. Abu'l-Fida (Abulfeda) (1273–1331), a Kurdish politician, geographer and historian from Syria who had descended from Najm ad-Din Ayyub, father of Saladin.

- Tarikh al-Mukhtasar fi Akhbar al-Bashar (Concise History of Humanity). In Recueil des historiens des croisades (RHC) Historiens orientaux, Volume 1 (1872).
- An Abridgment of the History at the Human Race. A continuation of ibn al-Athir's The Complete History through 1329.
- Taqwim al-Buldan (A Sketch of the Countries). A text on geography that includes descriptions of the major cities of the world and contains the first known reference to the circumnavigator's paradox in which travelers gain or lose a day circling the globe.

Rashid al-Din. Rashid-al-Din Hamadani (1247–1318) was a Jewish-turned-Islamic physician and historian who was vizier to the Ilkhan Ghazan.

- Jāmiʿ al-Tawārīkh (Compendium of Chronicles). A history of the Mongols from the time of Adam until 1311. The books include History of the Mongols, regarding the Khanate conquests from Genghis Khan through that of Ghazan. They also include the History of the Franks through 1305, based on sources such as Italian explorer Isol the Pisan and the Chronicon pontificum et imperatorum of Martin of Opava. A third part on geography has been lost.

Tractatus de locis et statu sancte terre ierosolimitane. The Tractatus de locis et statu sancte terre ierosolimitane (late 12th or early 13th century) is an anonymous work concerning the geography of the Kingdom of Jerusalem prior to the fall of Jerusalem in 1187. It also discusses the ethnography of the Christian groups living there as well as the feudal structure of the kingdom. The non-Christian groups including Jews, Bedouins and Assassins are also discussed.

Al-Idrisi. Muhammad al-Idrisi (1100–1165), an Arab geographer who spent time at the court of Roger II of Sicily.

- Tabula Rogeriana (1158). Commissioned by Roger II of Sicily, the Tabula Rogeriana was the most advanced map of the world at the time it was published in 1158 and was still in use at the time of Christopher Columbus.
- Nuzhat al-Mushtaq, a universal geography, translated by Lebanese Maronite Gabriel Sionita (1577–1648).

Yaqut al-Hamawi. Yaqut al-Hamawi (1179–1229), an Arab scholar.

- Kitāb Mu'jam al-Buldān (Alphabetical Dictionary of Geography) is simultaneously a book of geography, history, biography and Islam. Much of his work was derived from travel through Egypt, Syria and Persia.

Izz al-Din ibn Shaddad. Izz al-Din ibn Shaddad al-Halabi (1217-1285), an Aleppan geographer employed by the Ayyubids.

- Al-a'laq al-khatira fi dhikr umara' al-Sham wa'l-Jazira, a historical geography of Syria and al-Jazira.
- Ta'rikh al-Malik al-zahir, a biography of Baibars, Mamluk sultan of Egypt.

Ibn Abd al-Zahir. Ibn Abd al-Zahir (1223–1293), also known as Muhi ad-Din ibn Abdazzahir, was an Egyptian historian who wrote extensively of the Mamluk sultans as well as a geographical study.

- Kitāb al-Rawḍah al-Bahīyah. A geographical study used extensively by Egyptian historian al-Makrizi.
- Lives of Baibars and Qalawun. A biography of sultans Baibars and al-Mansur Qalawun.

Al-Dimashqi. Shams al-Din al-Ansari al-Dimashqi (1256–1327), an Arab geographer known as the Damascene.

- K. Nuk̲h̲bat al-Dahr fi ʿAd̲j̲āʾib al-Barr wal-Baḥr (Cosmographie de Ch. A. Abd. M. de-Dimichqi, or Geography). A work covering Greater Syria as well as Southeast Asia.

Hamdallah Mustawfi. Hamdallah Mustawfi Qazvini (1281–1349), a Persian historian and geographer.

- Nozhat al-qolub. A work on geography that may be derived from a lost work of Rashid-al-Din Hamadani, the third part of his Jami' al-tawarikh.

Marino Sanudo. Marino Sanudo (Sanuto) the Elder (1260–1338), a Venetian statesman and geographer.

- Liber Secretorum Fidelium Crucis (Secrets of True Crusaders to help them to recover the Holy Land) (1321). A work written in 1321 on geography which was offered to the pope as a manual for the reconquest of the Holy Land. The earliest surviving edition of Liber Secretorum Fidelium Crucis is from Volume II of Gesta Dei per Francos. In PPTS, Volume XII.2.

Conti, Niccolò de'. Niccolò de' Conti (c. 1395 – 1469), an Italian merchant, explorer, and writer, who traveled to India and other Asian destinations. His travels were used to help create the Fra Mauro map of 1450.

- The travels of Nicolò Conti in the East in the early part of the fifteenth century (1857), Translated from the original of Poggio Bracciolini (1380–1459), with notes, by John Winter Jones (1805–1881), Keeper of the Printed Books, British Museum.
- In India in the fifteenth century (1857). Translated into English, and edited with an introduction by English geographer Richard Henry Major (1818–1891). Issued by the Hakluyt Society, First series, Volume 22.

Jean Germain, bishop of Nevers and Châlons. Jean Germain (1400–1461), bishop of Nevers from 1430 to 1436 and bishop of Châlons from 1436 to 1461. Councilor to Philip the Good and chancellor to the Order of the Golden Fleece. (cf. French Wikipedia, Jean Germain)

- Mappemonde spirituelle (1449), a geographical work that plotted the history of Christian martyrs.

William Wey. William Wey (c. 1407 – 1476), an English traveller and author.

- Map of the Holy Land (1867). Illustrating the itineraries of William Wey, fellow of Eton in AD 1458 and 1462. In facsimile from the original in the Bodleian Library. Introduction by English cleric, academic and antiquary George Williams (1814–1878). Roxburghe Club Books, Volume 88.

Mīr-Khvānd. Mohammad ibn Khwāndshāh ibn Mahmud (Mir-Khwānd) (1433–1498), a Persian-language historian from Bukhara.

- Rawżat aṣ-ṣafāʾ fī sīrat al-anbiyāʾ w-al-mulūk w-al-khulafā (The Gardens of purity in the biography of the prophets and kings and caliph), 7 volumes with geographic index (1497). A history of Islam from its origins until the late fifteenth century. Uses over forty major Arabic and Persian histories.
- The History of the Atábeks of Syria and Persia. Translation of portions of Volume 4 of Rawżat aṣ-ṣafāʾ, edited by English orientalist William H. Morley, with a section on the Coins Struck by the Atábeks of Irak by English antiquary and numismatist William S. W. Vaux.

Johann Romberch. Johann Host von Romberch (c. 1480 – 1533), a German Dominican and writer.

- Veridica Terre Sancte reginoumque finitimarum ac in eis mirabilium Descriptio (1519). Art of the Holy Land based on the descriptions in Descriptio Terrae Sanctae by Burchard of Mount Sion (fl. 1283)
- Dialogo di M. Lodovico Dolce, nel quale si ragiona del modo di accrescere e conseruar la memoria (1562). An edition of a work by Italian art historian Lodovico Dolce (1508/10 – 1568)

Abraham Ortelius. Abraham Ortelius (1527–1598), a Brabantian cartographer, geographer, and cosmographer, known as the creator of the first modern atlas.

- Theatrum Orbis Terrarum (1570). Theatre of the World, regarded as the first modern atlas.

Michaël Eytzinger. Michaël Eytzinger (c. 1530 – 1598), an Austrian genealogist, cartographer and historian, who invented the Ahnentafel genealogical numbering system. Also known as Michael Aitsinger.

- Terra Promissionis topographice atque historice descripta (1582). The work provides a list of the holy sites arranged in colophons. A portrait of the author and a folded map of the Holy Land are included. Used as a source for Bibliographia Geographica Palestinæ (1867) by Swiss orientalist Titus Tobler (1806–1877).

Christian van Adrichem. Christian Kruik van Adrichem (1533–1585) was a Catholic priest and theological writer.

- Theatrum Terrae Sanctae et Biblicarum Historiarum (1590). A description of Palestine, with two maps, and of the antiquities of Jerusalem, with a comprehensive list of sources. Includes a chronology of Biblical history from Adam through the death of John the Apostle in 109. Referred to as Johannes van Adrichom in Bibliographia Geographica Palestinæ (1867) by Swiss orientalist Titus Tobler (1806–1877).

Gabriel Sionita. Gabriel Sionita (1577–1648), a Lebanese Maronite orientalist and author.

- Geographia Nubiensis (1619). A translation of De geographia universali, or Nuzhat al-Mushtaq, by Arab geographer Muhammad al-Idrisi (1100–1165).
- Arabia, seu, Arabum vicinarumq[ue] gentium Orientalium leges, ritus, sacri et profani mores, instituta et historia (1633). Laws of the Eastern rites, sacred and profane behavior, institutions and history is also near several routes through Arabia, containing many noteworthy accounts. Includes works by Flemish antiquarian Jan van Cootwijk (died 1629) and Arab historian Yūḥannā al-Ḥaṣrūnī (died 1626).

Yūḥannā al-Ḥaṣrūnī. Yūḥannā al-Ḥaṣrūnī (Joannes Hesronita) (died 1626), an Arab author.

- Geographia Nubiensis, id est accuratissima totius orbis in septem climata divisi descriptio (1619). A translation of the Tabula Rogeriana by Arab geographer Muhammad al-Idrisi (1100–1165).
- Arabia, seu, Arabum vicinarumq[ue] gentium Orientalium leges, ritus, sacri et profani mores, instituta et historia (1633). Inputs to work by Maronite Gabriel Sionita (1577–1648).

Philippe Labbe. Philippe Labbe (1607–1667), a French Jesuit who wrote on historical, geographical and philological topics, including those of the Byzantine empire.

- De Byzantinæ Historiæ Scriptoribus, 24 volumes (1648–1729). An account of primary sources of Byzantine history from 330 to 1453. Later revised and expanded by Danish historian Barthold Niebuhr into the Corpus Scriptorum Historæ Byzantinæ (CSHB).

Thomas Fuller. Thomas Fuller (1608–1661), an English churchman and historian.

- A Pisgah-Sight of Palestine and the confines thereof; with the history of the Old and New Testaments acted thereon (1650). A descriptive geography of the Holy Land, with "facsimiles of all the quaint maps and illustrations" of the original edition.

Giovanni Careri. Giovanni Francesco Gemelli Careri (1651–1725), an Italian adventurer and traveler, among the first Europeans to tour the world by securing passage on merchant ships. Generally referred to as Gemelli. His travels may have inspired the character Phileas Fogg in Jules Verne's Around the World in Eighty Days. He was suspected of spying for the Vatican on his journey.

- Giro Del Mondo, 6 volumes (1699). The account of Gernelli's world trip in 1693 including Egypt, Constantinople, and the Holy Land (Volume 1); Armenia and Persia (Volume 2); and China, where he was able to visit the emperor at Beijing, attend the Lantern Festival celebrations and tour the Great Wall. Used as a source for Bibliographia Geographica Palestinæ (1867) by Swiss orientalist Titus Tobler (1806–1877).

Joseph Pitts. Joseph Pitts (c. 1662 – c. 1735?), an English author and geographer, taken into slavery by Barbary pirates in Algiers in 1678.

- A True and Faithful Account of the Religion and Manners of the Mohammetans (1704).
- The Red Sea and adjacent countries at the close of the seventeenth century (18th century). With Jacques-Charles Poncet (1655–1706) and William Daniel.

Raffaele Savonarola. Innocenzo Raffaele Savonarola (1646–1730), an Italian a monk and cartographer who worked in the monastery library in Padua, also known by the alias of Alphonsus Lasor a Verea.

- Universus terrarum orbis scriptorum calamo delineatus ... qui de Europae, Asiae, Africae, & Americae regnis, provinciis, populis, civitatibus...., 2 volumes (1713). A historical dictionary the geography and cartography of the time and includes a large number of maps and views taken from old plates dating from a century or more earlier. The plates are taken from Francesco Valeggio's Raccolta (1595), Tomaso Porcacchi Castilione's Le Isole più famose del mondo (1572), Gioseppe Rosaccio's Viaggi a Costantinopoli (1598), Giovanni Antonio Magini's Geografia (1596) and Donato Bertelli's Tavola moderne di geographia (cf. Lafreri atlases). Used as a source for Bibliographia Geographica Palestinæ (1867) by Swiss orientalist Titus Tobler (1806–1877).

Claude Buffier. Claude Buffier (1661–1737), French philosopher and historian.

- Géographie Universelle (1739). Exposée dans les differentes méthodes qui peuvent abréger l'étude & faciliter l'usage de cette science, avec les secours des vers artificiels. Engraved plates by Pierre François Giffart (1638–1723)

Richard Pococke. Richard Pococke (1704–1765), an English prelate and anthropologist.

- A Description of the East: and some other countries, 2 volumes (1743–1745). An account based on Pococke's travels to the Near East from 1737 to 1742.

Frederic Norden. Frederic Louis Norden (1708–1742), a Danish naval captain, cartographer, and archaeological explorer.

- Voyage d'Egypte et de Nubie (1755). Extensive documentation and drawings of Norden's voyage through Egypt in 1737–1738.

Carsten Niebuhr. Carsten Niebuhr (1733–1815), a German mathematician, cartographer, and explorer in the service of Denmark. Participant in the Danish Arabia Expedition of 1761–1767.

- Description de l'Arabia d'apres les observations et recherches faites dans le pays mome (1771).
- Voyage en Arabie and en d'autres pays circonvoisins
- Travels through Arabia and other Countries in the East, 2 volumes (1776–1780). Translation of Voyage en Arabie and en d'autres pays circonvoisins by Scottish writer Robert Heron (1764–1807).
- Description of Arabia (1797). Translation of portions of Description de l'Arabia..., in A Collection of Late Voyages and Travels (1797) by R. Heron.

Jean-Baptiste Bourguignon d'Anville. Jean Baptiste Bourguignon d'Anville (1697–1782), a French geographer and cartographer who greatly improved the standards of map-making. His maps of ancient geography have been characterized by careful, accurate work and based on original research. Over 1600 cartographic works are attributed to him. The cited reference below includes a partial bibliography.

- Compendium of Ancient Geography, 2 volumes (1742). Translated by British antiquarian John Horsley (c. 1685 – 1732), with an interesting discussion on translation.

Bibliography of Topography of Palestine. An extensive bibliography of works on the topography of Palestine from 333 to 1764 can be found in The Land of Promise: Notes of a Spring-journey from Beersheba to Sidon (1858) by Scottish churchman Horatius Bonar (1808–1889).

Wilhelm Bachiene. Wilhelm Albert Bachiene (1712–1783), a German cartographer.

- Historische und geographische beschreibung von Palästina, 7 volumes (1766–1775). The history and geography of the Holy Land according to its past and present, along with the associated landcharts. Used as a source for Bibliographia Geographica Palestinæ (1867) by Swiss orientalist Titus Tobler (1806–1877).

Gottlieb Stuck. Gottlieb Heinrich Stuck (1716–1787), a German geographer.

- Gottlieb Heinrich Stuck's...Verzeichniss von aeltern und neuern Land- und Reisebeschreibungen (1784). Directory of older and newer land and travel descriptions. With German geographer Johann Ernst Fabri (1755–1825). Used as a source for Bibliographia Geographica Palestinæ (1867) by Swiss orientalist Titus Tobler (1806–1877).

Johann Bellermann. Johann Joachim Bellermann (1754–1842), a German Hebraist and one of the experts in of Hebrew epigraphy.

- Handbuch der biblischen Literatur (1793). A handbook of Biblical literature, with a section on Biblical geography. Used as a source for Bibliographia Geographica Palestinæ (1867) by Swiss orientalist Titus Tobler (1806–1877).

Carl Ritter. Carl Ritter (1779–1859), a German geographer who was referenced by Swiss orientalist Titus Tobler (1806–1877) in his Bibliographia Geographica Palestinæ (1867).

- Die Erdkunde im Verhältniss zur Natur und zur Geschichte des Menschen, 17 volumes (1832–1859). Geography in relation to nature and human history. General comparative geography as a secure foundation for studying and teaching physical and historical sciences. Volume 17 covers Palestine, Syria and the Sinai.

Titus Tobler. Titus Tobler (1806–1877), a Swiss oriental scholar.

- Planography of Jerusalem (1858). A memoir to accompany the new-ground-plan of the city of Jerusalem and the environs, constructed anew by C. W. M. van de Velde. Includes the Arculf Map of Jerusalem, the second oldest known map of the city.
- Bibliographia Geographica Palestinæ (1867). A bibliography of sources for the geography of the Holy Land, prepared by Tobler after an 1865 visit there. Includes works by Michaël Eytzinger (c. 1530 – 1598), Christian Kruik van Adrichem (1533–1585), Giovanni Francesco Gemelli Careri (1651–1725), Wilhelm Albert Bachiene (1712–1783), Gottlieb Heinrich Stuck (1716–1787); Johann Joachim Bellermann (1754–1842), Gilles Boucher de La Richarderie (1733–1810), François-René de Chateaubriand (1768–1848), Ernst Friedrich Karl Rosenmüller (1768–1835), Joachim Heinrich Jäck (1777–1847), Heinrich Berghaus (1797–1884), Salomon Munk (1803–1867), Friedrich August Arnold (1812–1869), Ludovic Lalanne (1815–1898), Xavier Marmier (1808–1892), John Kitto (1804–1854), Carl Ritter (1779–1859), Gerhard Heinrich van Senden (1793–1851), Louis Vivien de Saint-Martin (1802 –1896), Laorti-Hadji (1789–1879), Edward (Eduard) Robinson (1794–1863), Alessandro Bassi (fl. 1857), Wilhelm Engelmann (1808–1878), Felix Geisheim (fl. 1858), Horatius Bonar (1808–1889), Heimann Jolowicz (1816–1875), Lorenz Clem. Gratz (1805–1884), C. W. M. van de Velde (1818–1898), Karl von Raumer (1783–1865), Julius Petzholdt (1812–1891), and Avraam S. Norov (Abraham von Noroff) (1795-1869).
- Descriptiones Terrae Sanctae ex saeculo VIII., IX., XII. et XV (1874). Descriptions of the Holy Land from the 8th through 15th centuries, compiled and edited by T. Tobler. Accounts include: Saint Willibald (723–726); Commemoratorium de Casis Dei vel Monasteriis, a survey of the Holy Land in 808 commissioned by Charlemagne; Bernard the Pilgrim's travels (c. 865); an anonymous account known as Innominatus VII (1145); John of Würzburg's account (1165); Innominatus VIII (1185); La Citez de Jherusalem (c. 1187), a late 12th-century French description of the holy city used in the Rothelin Continuation; and, Description of the Holy Land (1422) by John Poloner. With commentary by the editor.
- Itinera hierosolymitana et descriptiones terrae sanctae bellis sacris anteriora (1879). Itineraries of pilgrimages to the Holy Land from the fourth through the eleventh century. Editor, with French historian Auguste Molinier (1851–1904) and Swiss archivist Charles A. Kohler (1854–1917).

M. J. de Goeje. Michael Jan de Goeje (1836–1909), a Dutch orientalist focusing on Arabia and Islam.

- Bibliotheca Geographorum Arabicorum, 8 volumes (1870–1894).
- Selection from the Annals of Tabari (1902). Selected translations from the chronicle History of the Prophets and Kings (Annals of Tabari), written by Persian historian Muhammad ibn Jarir al-Tabari (838–923).
- Selections from Arabic Geographical Literature (1907).

Guy Le Strange. Guy Le Strange (1854–1933), a British orientalist specializing in historical geography of the Middle East and editing of Persian geographical texts.

- Description of Syria (including Palestine). By Arab geographer Al-Maqdisi (c. 945 – 991). Translated and edited by British orientalist G. Le Strange.
- The lands of the eastern caliphate; Mesopotamia, Persia, and Central Asia, from the Moslem conquest to the time of Timur (1905).
- Palestine under the Moslems: a description of Syria and the Holy Land from A.D. 650 to 1500 (1975).

Reinhold Röhricht. Gustav Reinhold Röhricht (1842–1905), a German historian of the Crusades, regarded as a pioneer with fellow German historian Heinrich Hagenmeyer (1834-1915) in the history of the kingdom of Jerusalem, laying the foundation for modern Crusader research.

- Bibliotheca geographica Palaestinae (1890). Summaries of over 3500 books on the geography of the Holy Land issued between 355 and 1878.
- Karten und Pläne zur Palästinakunde aus dem 7 bis 16 Jahrhundert (1895). A catalog of the eight known Crusader maps of Jerusalem. In Zeitschrift des deutschen Palästina-Vereins Bd.18 (1895), pp. 173–182.
- Marino Sanudo sen. als Kartograph Palästinas (1898). In Zeitschrift des deutschen Palästina-Vereins Bd. 21 (1898), pp. 84–126.
- Deutsche Pilgerreisen nach dem heiligen Lande (1900). German pilgrimages to the Holy Land.

The Atlas of the Crusades (1999) by Jonathan Riley-Smith (1938–2016), a British historian of the Crusades.

== Archaeology ==
The topic of archaeology as it pertains to the study of the Crusades includes archaeology per se as well as archaeoseismology, diplomatics, epigraphy, palaeography and sigillography. Other areas include Egyptology, Palestinology, botany, herpetology, geology, art history and architectural studies. Historians and scientists in this category are listed below.

George Sandys. George Sandys (1578–1644), an English traveler, colonist, poet, and translator. Sandys' writings influenced contemporary literature and other disciplines including art, archaeology and geography. Sandys is considered to be the first English Egyptologist.

- A Relation of a Journey begun an. Dom. 1610, 4 volumes (1615). The account of an extended tour of Europe and the Middle East in 1610–1612, giving detailed accounts of Constantinople, Cairo, Jerusalem, Emmaus, Bethlehem and Nazareth.
- A General History of the Ottoman Empire (1740). Including Turkey, Egypt, the Holy Land, Jerusalem, Palestine and Arabia. Conjecture as the fate of the Ten Lost Tribes of Israel.
- Sandys Travels: containing an history of the original and present state of the Turkish empire (1673). The Mahometan religion and ceremonies. "A description of Constantinople ... also, of Greece ... Of Ægypt ... A description of the Holy Land ..." Lastly, Italy described, and the islands adjoining. Illustrated with fifty graven maps and figures. 7th edition.

Jan van Cootwijk. Jan van Cootwijk (died 1629), a Flemish antiquary, also known as Johannes Cotovicus.

- Itinerarium Hierosolymitanum et Syriacum, 2 volumes (1619). An account of a journey to Jerusalem and Syria. Cootwijk was the first to describe the archaeological remains of the Holy Land. He was also the first European researcher to identify the Tomb of the Kings in Jerusalem. Contains valuable maps and drawings of Jaffa, Ramle, Bethlehem and Jerusalem. Includes detailed plans of the Church of the Holy Sepulchre, the Temple Mount, the Kidron Valley and Mount Zion. Also includes an abridgment of De magistratibus et republica Venetorum (1543) by Gasparo Contarini .
- Arabia, seu, Arabum vicinarumq[ue] gentium Orientalium leges, ritus, sacri et profani mores, instituta et historia (1633). Inputs to work by Maronite Gabriel Sionita (1577–1648).

Giovanni Biagio Amico. Giovanni Biagio Amico (1684–1754), an Italian architect, theologian and priest. (cf. Italian Wikipedia, Giovanni Biagio Amico)

- Trattato delle piante et immagini de Sacri edifizi di Terre Santa (1620). A treatise on the plants and images of the sacred buildings of the Holy Land. Of particular value are the many drawings and plans of Jerusalem and Bethlehem.

Eugène Roger. Eugène Roger (17th century), French missionary in the Holy Land (1630–1635). Roger served as the physician of the Druze leader Fakhr ad-Din II.

- La Terra Sainte ou description topographique tres particuliere des saints Lieux, et de La Terra de Promission (1664). Describes the differing societies (Turks, Druze, Jews, Greeks) in Palestine under Ottoman rule. The chapter Des Iuifs que habitent en la Terre Sainte (Of the Jews that inhabit the Holy Land) includes a sketch of Jewish figures performing religious rituals.

Jacob Spon. Jacob Spon (1647–1685), a French physician and archaeologist. Spon was a pioneer in the exploration of the monuments of Greece.

- Voyage d'Italie, de Dalmatie, de Grece, et du Levant: fait aux années 1675 & 1676, 2 volumes (1676). With travel writer George Wheler (1651–1724).
- Recherche des antiquités et curiosités de la ville de Lyon (1857).
- Voyage d'Italie curieux et nouveau (1681).

Bernard Randolph. Bernard Randolph (1643–1690?), an English cartographer and traveler, specializing in Greece.

- The Present State of the Morea (1680). Called anciently Peloponnesus: together with a description of the city of Athens, islands of Zant, Strafades, and Serigo. With the maps of Morea and Greece, and several cities. Also a true prospect of the grand serraglio, or imperial palace of Constantinople, as it appears from Galata: curiously engraved on copper plates.
- The Present State of the Islands of the Archipelago (1687).

Jean Mabillon. Jean Mabillon (1632–1707), a French Benedictine monk and scholar of the Congregation of Saint Maur. One of the greatest historical scholar of the 17th century, he is considered to be the founder of the disciplines of palaeography and diplomatics.

- De re diplomatica (1681). An analysis of medieval documents and manuscripts back to the early 7th century. (cf. French Wikipedia, De re diplomatica)

Bernard de Montfaucon. Bernard de Montfaucon (1655–1741), a Benedictine monk and scholar who is considered one of the founders of archaeology and palaeography.

- Bibliotheca Coisliniana (1705). An examination of ancient and medieval Greek writings.
- L'antiquité expliquée et représentée en figures (Antiquity Explained and Represented in Diagrams), 15 volumes (1719–1724).

Fedinand Delamonce. Ferdinand-Sigismond Delamonce (1678–1753), a German-French architect. (cf. French Wikipedia, Ferdinand-Sigismond Delamonce)

- De tabernaculo foederis, de sancta civitate Jerusalem, et de templo ejus, libri septem (1720). A Latin treatise on the Ark of the Covenant by Bernard Lamy (1640–1715). Edited by French historian Pierre Nicolas Desmolets (1678–1760) who added Vita auctoris (a biography of the author) and De templo Salomonis historico (history of Solomon's Temple). Engraved plates by F. Delamonce and Pierre Giffart (1638–1723).

Robert Wood. Robert Wood (1717–1771), an Irish traveler, classical scholar, civil servant and politician. Wood travelled with James Dawkins (1722–1757), who funded his work, and artist Giovanni Battista Borra (1713–1770).

- Les Ruines de Palmyre, autrement dite Tedmor au désert (1753). Engravings by Pierre Fourdrinier (1698–1758) based on drawings of G. B. Borra.
- The Ruins of Palmyra, otherwise Tedmor, in the desart (1753). English edition of Les Ruines de Palmyre.
- Les Ruines de Balbec, autrement dite Heliopolis dans la Coelosyrie (1757). Engravings by P. Fourdrinier based on drawings of G. B. Borra
- The Ruins of Balbec, otherwise Heliopolis in Cœlosyria (1757). English edition of Les Ruines de Balbec.

Alexander Russell. Alexander Russell (1715–1768), a Scottish physician and naturalist.

- The Natural History of Aleppo, and parts adjacent (1756). Revised and expanded by herpetologist Patrick Russell (1727–1805) in the 2nd edition (1794). Containing a description of the city, and the principal natural productions in its neighbourhood. Together with an account of the climate, inhabitants, and diseases; particularly of the plague.

Ernst Friedrich Karl Rosenmüller. Ernst Friedrich Karl Rosenmüller (1768–1835), a German orientalist and theologian.

- Reis in Palestina: Syrië en Egypte, gedaan in het jaar 1817 (1822). Journey in Palestine: Syria and Egypt, done in the year 1817.
- Handbuch der Biblischen Alterthumskunde, 4 volumes (1823–1831). Handbook of biblical antiquity, concerning the geography, flora, fauna and mineralogy of the Holy Land, Arabia and Central Asia. Used as a source for Tobler's Bibliographia Geographica Palestinæ (1867).
- Biblical Geography of Asia Minor, Phoenicia, and Arabia (1836). Volume 1 of Handbuch der Biblischen Alterthumskunde.
- The Biblical Geography of Central Asia, 2 volumes (1836–1837). Volumes 2 and 3 of Handbuch der Biblischen Alterthumskunde. With a general introduction to the study of sacred geography, including the antediluvian period. Translated by Scottish historian Nathaniel Morren (1798–1847).
- Mineralogy and Botany of the Bible (1840). Volume 4 of Handbuch der Biblischen Alterthumskunde.

Heinrich Berghaus. Heinrich Karl Wilhelm Berghaus (1797–1884), a German geographer and cartographer.

- Dr. Berghaus' Physikalischer Atlas, 2 volumes (1838–1848). Used as a source for Bibliographia Geographica Palestinæ (1867) by Swiss orientalist Titus Tobler (1806–1877).

Karl Georg von Raumer. Karl Georg von Raumer (1783–1865), a German geologist and educator.

- Kreuzzüge (1840–1864).
- Beiträge zur Biblischen Geographie: Nebst einer Höhendurchnitte (1843).
- Palästina (1850).

Edward Robinson. Edward (Eduard) Robinson (1794–1863), an American Biblical scholar whose work in geography and archaeology earned him the epithets "Father of Biblical Geography" and "Founder of Modern Palestinology." Referenced in Tobler's Bibliographia Geographica Palestinæ.

- Biblical Researches in Palestine, 3 volumes (1841). Based on a 1838 exploration trip to Palestine. With American missionary Eli Smith (1801–1857).
- Biblical Researches in Palestine: First Supplement (1842).
- Notes on Biblical Geography (1849).
- Later Biblical Researches in Palestine, and in the Adjacent Regions (1856). A journal of travels in the year 1852. Drawn up from the original diaries, with historical illustrations, with new maps and plans.

Salomon Munk. Salomon Munk (1803–1867), a French orientalist.

- Palestine: description géographique, historique, et archéologique (1845). Used as a source for Bibliographia Geographica Palestinæ (1867) by Swiss orientalist Titus Tobler (1806–1877)

Joseph Ignatius Ritter. Joseph Ignatius Ritter (1787–1857), a German historian.

- Ueber die Verehrung der Reliquien und besonders des heil (1845). About the veneration of relics and especially of the Holy Coat.

Friedrich August Arnold. Friedrich August Arnold (1812–1869), a German orientalist. (cf. German Wikipedia, Friedrich August Arnold)

- Palästina: historisch-geographisch mit besonderer berüksichtigung der Helmuthschen karte für theologen und gebildete bibelleser (1845). Palestine: historically and geographically with special consideration of the Helmuth map for theologians and educated Biblical readers. Used as a source for Bibliographia Geographica Palestinæ (1867) by Swiss orientalist Titus Tobler (1806–1877).

Jean Alexandre Buchon. Jean Alexandre Buchon (1791–1849). a French historian.

- Atlas des nouvelles recherches historiques sur la principauté française de Morée et ses hautes baronies fondées à la suite de la quatrième croisade (1845). Forming the second part of this work and serving as a complement to the historical, genealogical and numismatic clarification of the French principality of the Morea and to the journey in Morea, mainland Greece, the Cyclades and the Ionian Island.

Carl Benedict Hase. Carl Benedict (Charles-Benoît) Hase (1780–1864), a French Hellenist.

- Recueil des Itinéraires Anciens (1845). A collection of ancient routes including the Antonine Itinerary, the Tabula Peutingeriana and assorted Greek tours.
- Recueil des historiens des croisades, historiens grecs (RHC Gr.), 2 volumes (1875–1881). The Greek volumes of RHC were edited by C. Hase.

Lorenz Clemens Gratz. Lorenz Clemens Gratz (1805–1884), a German Biblical scholar.

- Erd- und Länderkunde der heiligen Schrift (1848). Geography and regional studies of the Holy Scriptures for Catholic schools and families to explain the sacred history of the Old and New Covenants.

Vivien de Saint-Martin. Louis Vivien de Saint-Martin (1802 –1896), a French historian and geographer.

- Description historique et géographique de l'Asie Mineure, 2 volumes (1852). Historical and geographical description of Asia Minor, including ancient times, the Middle Ages and modern times, with a detailed account of the journeys that have been made in the peninsula, from the time of the Crusades to the most recent times. Preceded by a table of the geographical history of Asia, from the most ancient times to the present day. Used as a source for Bibliographia Geographica Palestinæ (1867) by Swiss orientalist Titus Tobler (1806–1877).

Wilhelm Engelmann. Wilhelm Engelmann (1808–1878), a German publisher and bookseller.

- Bibliotheca geographica (1858). In Tobler's Bibliographia Geographica Palestinæ.

Heimann Jolowicz. Heimann Jolowicz (1816–1875), a German historian mentioned in Bibliographia Geographica Palestinæ.

- Bibliotheca Ægyptiaca (1858). Bibliography on Egypt up to 1857, its geography, natural history, monuments, language, script, religion, mythology, history, art and science.

C. M. W. van de Velde. Charles William Meredith van de Velde (1818–1898), a Dutch painter, cartographer and missionary.

- Narrative of a Journey through Syria and Palestine in 1851 and 1852, 2 volumes (1854).
- Van de Velde maps of Palestine and Jerusalem (1858). An important scientific mapping of Palestine and Jerusalem.
- Memoir to Accompany the Map of the Holy Land (1858).
- Planography of Jerusalem (1858). With Titus Tobler. Memoir to accompany the new-ground-plan of the city of Jerusalem and the environs, constructed anew by C. W. M. van de Velde.

James Fergusson. James Fergusson (1808–1886), a Scottish architectural historian.

- Notes on the Site of the Holy Sepulchre at Jerusalem (1860).
- A History of Architecture in all Countries, from the earliest times to the present day, 4 volumes (1865).
- The Holy Sepulchre and the Temple at Jerusalem: the substance of two lectures delivered in the Royal Institution (1865).
- The Temples of the Jews and the other Buildings in the Haram Area at Jerusalem (1878).

Melchior Vogüé. Melchior, Marquis de Vogüé (1829–1916), a French archaeologist, orientalist, epigraphist, historian and diplomat. Served as ambassador to Constantinople.

- Monnaies inedites des Croisades (1864). A treatise on the churches of the Holy Land.

Thomas Wright. Thomas Wright (1810–1877), an English antiquarian and writer. Additional works listed in Chapter 6 above.

- Essays on Archaeological Subjects: and on various questions connected with the history of art, science and literature in the Middle Ages (1861).

Emmanuel Guillaume-Rey. Emmanuel Guillaume-Rey (1837–1913), a French archaeologist, topographer and orientalist who wrote seminal works on the archaeology of the Holy Land.

- Voyage dans le Haouran et aux bords de la Mer Morte exécuté pendant les années 1857 et 1858 (1861). An account of a voyage on the Dead Sea and to the Hauran.
- Étude historique et topographique de la tribu de Juda (1862). A historical and topographical study of the tribe of Judah.
- Essai sur la domination française en Syrie durant le moyen âge (1866). An essay on French domination in Syria during the Middle Ages
- Etude sur les monuments de l'architecture militaire des croisés en Syrie et dans l'île de Chypre (1871). A study on the monuments of the military architecture of the Crusaders in Syria and on Cyprus
- Les familles d'Outremer (1869). Original work by French historian Charles du Cange (1610–1688), extended by Guillaume-Rey. Genealogy of the royal families of the Kingdom of Jerusalem through 1244.
- Etudes sur les monuments de l'architecture militaire des croisés (1871). A study of Crusader fortifications in the Holy Land.
- Recherches géographiques et historiques sur la domination des latins en Orient, accompagnées de textes inédits ou peu connus du XIIe au XIVe siècle (1877).
- Étude sur la topographie de la ville d'Acre au XIIIe siècle (1879). A study of the topography of Acre in the thirteenth century.

Theodor Mommsen. Christian Matthias Theodor Mommsen (1817–1903), a German classical scholar, historian and archaeologist.

- Corpus Inscriptionum Latinarum (CIL), 15 volumes (1872). A collection of ancient Latin inscriptions. Two additional volumes were published in 1936 and 1986. Published by the Berlin-Brandenburg Academy of Sciences and Humanities, founded by Mommsen in 1853.

Melchior Vogüé. Melchior, Marquis de Vogüé (1829–1916), a French archaeologist, orientalist, epigraphist, historian and diplomat. Served as ambassador to Constantinople.

- Monnaies inedites des Croisades (1864).
- The Recovery of Jerusalem: A narrative of exploration and discovery in the city and the Holy Land (1871). With Richard Phené Spiers, Charles W. Wilson, Arthur Penrhyn Stanley, Charles Warren and others.
- Jérusalem hier et aujourd'hui: notes de voyage (1912).

Charles W. Wilson. Sir Charles William Wilson (1836–1905), a British Army officer, geographer and archaeologist. Wilson served as director of the Palestine Pilgrims' Text Society and was chairman of the Palestine Exploration Fund.

- The Recovery of Jerusalem: A narrative of exploration and discovery in the city and the Holy Land (1871). With Richard Phené Spiers, Melchior Vogüé, Arthur Penrhyn Stanley, Charles Warren and others.
- Picturesque Palestine, Sinai, and Egypt, 4 volumes (1880–1884).
- The Masonry of the Haram Wall, in the Quarterly statement of The Palestine Exploration Fund (1880). See also The Gates of the Haram Area, in Volume IV of the Library of the Palestine Pilgrims' Text Society
- Library of the Palestine Pilgrims' Text Society (1897). Editor of numerous volumes of the series.
- Names and Places in the Old and New Testament and Apocrypha: with their modern identifications (1889). With Claude R. Conder and George Armstrong.
- Ancient Jerusalem: a lecture delivered for the Palestine Exploration Fund (1892).

Richard Phené Spiers. Richard Phené Spiers (1838–1916), an English architect and author.

- The Recovery of Jerusalem: A narrative of exploration and discovery in the city and the Holy Land (1871). With Charles W. Wilson, Melchior Vogüé, Arthur Penrhyn Stanley, Charles Warren and others.
- A History of Ancient and Medieval Architecture, 2 volumes (1893).

Charles Warren. Sir Charles Warren (1840–1927), an officer in the British Royal Engineers. An early European archaeologist in the Holy Land, and particularly the Temple Mount. He was head of the London Metropolitan Police during the Jack the Ripper murders.

- The Recovery of Jerusalem: A narrative of exploration and discovery in the city and the Holy Land (1871). With Richard Phené Spiers, Melchior Vogüé, Charles W. Wilson, Arthur P. Stanley and others.
- The Temple or the Tomb (1880). Giving further evidence in favour of the authenticity of the present site of the Holy Sepulchre, and pointing out some of the principal misconceptions contained in Notes on the Site of the Holy Sepulchre at Jerusalem (1860) and The Temples of the Jews and the other Buildings in the Haram Area at Jerusalem (1878), by Scottish architectural historian James Fergusson (1808–1886).

Charles Clermont-Ganneau. Charles Simon Clermont-Ganneau (1846–1923), a French orientalist and archaeologist.

- Les fraudes archéologíques en Palestine (1885). Suivies de quelques monuments phéniciens apocryphes, avee 20 gravures et fae-similes.
- Etudes d'Archéologie Orientale, 2 volumes (1895–1897).

Max van Berchem. Max van Berchem (1863–1921), a Swiss epigraphist and historian, and a pioneer in the use of Arabic epigraphs and inscriptions in historical analysis.

- Matériaux pour un Corpus Inscriptionum Arabicarum (1894). A reference work on Arabic inscriptions. With French orientalist Gaston Wiet (1887–1971) and German Iranologist Ernst Emil Herzfeld (1879–1948).
- Epigraphie des Assassins de Syrie (1897). The epigraphs of the Assassins of Syria during the time of Louis IX of France and the Seventh Crusade (1248–1254).
- Notes sur les croisades. Le royaume de Jérusalem et le livre de m. Röhricht (1902). Notes on the Crusades, in particular the royalty of Jerusalem, based on the work of German historian Reinhold Röhricht (1842-1905).
- Monuments et inscriptions de lʾatābek Luʾluʾ de Mossoul (1906). Monuments and inscriptions of the Armenian ruler of Mosul Badr al-Din Lu'lu' (died 1259).
- Épigraphie des Atabeks de Damas (1909). Epigraphs of the atabegs of Damascus from Atsiz ibn Abaq through Toghtekin (1076–1128).

Ernst Emil Herzfeld. Ernst Emil Herzfeld (1879–1948), a German archaeologist and Iranologist.

- Matériaux pour un Corpus Inscriptionum Arabicarum (1894). A reference work on Arabic inscriptions. With Swiss epigraphist Max van Berchem (1863–1921) and French orientalist Gaston Wiet (1887–1971).
- Archaeological History of Iran (1937).

Gaston Wiet. Gaston Wiet (1887–1971), a French orientalist.

- Matériaux pour un Corpus Inscriptionum Arabicarum (1894). A reference work on Arabic inscriptions. With Swiss epigraphist Max van Berchem (1863–1921) and German Iranologist Ernst Emil Herzfeld (1879–1948).
- Répertoire chronologique d'épigraphie arabe (1931).

Urbain Bouriant. Urbain Bouriant (1849–1903), a French Egyptologist, who discovered the Gospel of Peter in a tomb at Akhmim.

- Description topographique et historique de l'Égypte, 2 volumes (1895–1900). French translation of the Al-Mawāʻiẓ wa-al-Iʻtibār bi-Dhikr al-Khiṭaṭ wa-al-āthār written by Egyptian historian al-Makrizi (1364–1442).

Fernand de Mély. Fernand Marie Charles Dusaussay de Mély (1851–1935), a French archaeologist, writer, art critic and collector. (cf. French Wikipedia, Fernand de Mély)

- Les lapidaires de l'antiquité et du moyen âge (1896).
- La croix des premiers croisés; la sainte lance; la sainte couronne (1904). A collection of documents relating to the status of relics at Constantinople before 1204 and their disposition after the Fourth Crusade. A follow-on to Exuviae Sacrae Constantinoploitanae (1877–1888), edited by French historian Paul E. D. Riant (1836-1888).

Charles Simon Clermont-Ganneau. Charles Simon Clermont-Ganneau (1846–1923), a French orientalist and archaeologist.

- Archæological Researches in Palestine during the years 1873–1874, 2 volumes (1896, 1899). Translated by Aubrey Stewart.
- Répertoire d'Epigraphie Sémitique (RES), 8 volumes (1900). With Syriac scholar Jean-Baptiste Chabot (1860–1948). Published by the Commission du Corpus inscriptionum semiticarum.
- Corpus Inscriptionum Semiticarum (CIS), 5 volumes (published through 1950). Published by the Académie des Inscriptions et Belles-Lettres.

Camile Enlart. Camille Enlart (1862–1927), a French archaeologist and art historian, with an emphasis on the Middle Ages. (cf. French Wikipedia, Camille Enlart)

- L'Art Gothique et la Renaissance en Chypre: illustré de 34 planches et de 421 figures, 2 volumes (1899).
- Gothic Art and the Renaissance in Cyprus (1987). Translation of L'art gothique et la renaissance en Chypre by David Hunt.
- Les Monuments des Croisés dans le Royaume de Jérusalem, 2 volumes (1925–1929). Crusader monuments of the kingdom of Jerusalem. Published by the Haut Commissariat Français en Syrie et au Liban Bibliothèque Archéologique.

Charles Diehl. Charles Diehl (1859–1944), a French historian specializing in Byzantine art and history.

- The Byzantine Empire and the Crusades (1902). The Byzantine empire from 1095 to 1189. In Essays on the Crusades, edited by Dale C. Munro.
- Byzance. Grandeur et décadence (1919). English translation, Byzantium: Greatness and Decline, published in 1957. Translated by Semantic scholar Naomi Walford with an introduction and bibliography by Byzantine scholar Peter Charanis (1908–1985).
- Jérusalem (1921). A survey of historical sites in Jerusalem in the early twentieth century.

Harry Luke. Sir Harry Charles Luke (1884–1969), an official in the British Colonial Office, serving in Cyprus and Palestine among others, and was the author of books on several of these countries.

- The Handbook of Cyprus (1913).
- The Handbook of Palestine (1922).

T. S. R. Boase. Thomas Sherrer Ross (T. S. R.) Boase (1898–1974), a British art historian.

- Boniface VIII (1933). A biography of pope Boniface VIII.
- Recent Developments in Crusading Historiography (1937). In History, Volume 22.
- The Cilician Kingdom of Armenia (1978).
- Ecclesiastical Art in the Crusader States in Palestine and Syria: A. Architecture and Sculpture. B. Mosaic, Painting and Minor Arts (1979). In the Wisconsin Collaborative History of the Crusades, Volume IV. The Art and Architecture of the Crusader States.
- Military Architecture in the Crusader States in Palestine and Syria (1979). In the Wisconsin Collaborative History of the Crusades, Volume IV. The Art and Architecture of the Crusader States.
- The Arts in Cyprus: A. Ecclesiastical Art (1979). In the Wisconsin Collaborative History of the Crusades, Volume IV. The Art and Architecture of the Crusader States.
- The Arts in Frankish Greece and Rhodes: A. Frankish Greece (with David J. Wallace). B. Rhodes (1979). In the Wisconsin Collaborative History of the Crusades, Volume IV. The Art and Architecture of the Crusader States.

Kathleen Kenyon. Dame Kathleen Mary Kenyon (1906–1978), a British archaeologist of Neolithic culture in the Fertile Crescent. One of the most influential archeologists of the 20th century.

- Archaeology in the Holy Land (1960).
- Ancient Cities (1994). Contribuiions by Kenyon, among a host of others.

Hugh N. Kennedy. Hugh N. Kennedy (born 1947), a British medieval historian.

- The Prophet and the Age of the Caliphates, 600–1050 (1986).
- Crusader Castles (1994). An account of the history and architecture of Crusader castles in the Kingdom of Jerusalem, County of Tripoli and Principality of Antioch between 1099 and 1291. Work summarized in The Crusades - An Encyclopedia.
- The Historiography of Islamic Egypt, c. 950-1800 (2000).

Moshe Sharon. Moshe Sharon (born 1937), an Israeli historian of Islam. Referred to as "Israel's greatest Middle East scholar."

- Corpus Inscriptionum Arabicarum Palaestinae, 6 volumes to date; 7th projected (1997–2021). An extensive work that provides the epigraphy of the Holy Land relating to construction, dedication, religious endowments, epitaphs, Quranic texts, prayers and invocations. His work has been instrumental in the continued analysis of original texts of the Crusades. Current volumes cover A through J, Part 1. Seventh volume partially covers Jerusalem.

Sheila Blair. Sheila Blair (born 1948), an American scholar of Islamic art.

- A Compendium of Chronicles: Rashid al-Din's Illustrated History of the World (1995). An illustrated (59 folios) edition of Jāmiʿ al-Tawārīkh (Compendium of Chronicles) by Persian historian Rashid-al-Din Hamadani (1247–1318). The commentary traces the compendium's history from the scriptorium in Tabriz, through Herat during the Timurid dynasty, through the 19th-century Mughal court and the East India Company, to its final acquisition by the Royal Asiatic Society. Includes a translation by Wheeler Thackson of the articles of endowment of the Rabi' Rashid. Volume XXVII of the Khalili Collection of Islamic Art.
- Arab Inscriptions in Persia (1998).Part 3 of Epigraphy in the Encyclopædia Iranica.
- Būyid Art and Architecture (2009).

A. H. S. Megaw. Arthur Hubert Stanley Megaw (1910–2006), an Irish architectural historian and archaeologist, specializing in Byzantine churches.

- The Arts in Cyprus: B. Military Architecture (1979). In the Wisconsin Collaborative History of the Crusades, Volume IV. The Art and Architecture of the Crusader States.

Jaroslav T. Folda III. Jaroslav T. Folda III (born 1940), an American art historian.

- Painting and Sculpture in the Latin Kingdom of Jerusalem, 1099–1291 (1979). In the Wisconsin Collaborative History of the Crusades, Volume IV. The Art and Architecture of the Crusader States.
- Crusader Art and Architecture: A Photographic Survey (1979). In the Wisconsin Collaborative History of the Crusades, Volume IV. The Art and Architecture of the Crusader States.
- Art in the Latin East, 1098–1291(1995). In The Oxford History of the Crusades.

Denys Pringle. Denys Pringle (born 1951), a British archaeologist and medievalist.

- Architecture in the Latin East, 1098–1571 (1995). In the Oxford History of the Crusades.
- Secular Buildings in the Crusader Kingdom of Jerusalem: An Archaeological Gazetteer (1997). A descriptive gazetteer of secular buildings (to include industrial sites) known to have existed within the Kingdom of Jerusalem.

Nasser Khalili. Sir Nasser David Khalili (born 1945), a British-Iranian scholar, collector, and philanthropist.

- Khalili Collections. Eight distinct art collections, including one on Islamic art.

Nicholas Ambraseys. Nicholas Ambraseys (1929–2012), a Greek archaeoseismologist who was a pioneer in the study of medieval earthquakes in the Middle East.

- The 12th century seismic paroxysm in the Middle East: a historical perspective (2004).

David Nicolle. David Nicolle (born 1944) is a British historian specializing in the military history of the Middle East.

- Crusader Castles in the Holy Land, 1192–1302 (2004). Examines the early fortifications erected by the Crusaders in Israel, the Palestinian territories, Jordan, Lebanon, Syria and Turkey.

Micaela Sinibaldi. Micaela Sinibaldi is a British medieval archaeologist.

- The historical earthquakes of Syria: an analysis of large and moderate earthquakes from 1365 B.C. to 1900 A.D. (2005).
- Settlement in Crusader Transjordan (1100–1189): a Historical and Archaeological Study (2014).
- Crusader Landscapes in the Medieval Levant: The Archaeology and History of the Latin East (2016). A collection of articles written to celebrate the career of Denys Pringle.
- The Crusader Lordship of Transjordan (1100–1189): settlement forms, dynamics and significance

Raphael Greenberg. Raphael (Rafi) Greenberg, an Israeli archaeologist.

- Israeli Archaeological Activity in the West Bank, 1967–2007: A Sourcebook (2009).

== Numismatics ==
Mīr-Khvānd. Mīr-Khvānd (1433–1498), a Persian-language historian from Bukhara.

- The History of the Atábeks of Syria and Persia. Translation of portions of Volume 4 of Rawżat aṣ-ṣafāʾ, edited by English orientalist William H. Morley, with a section on the Coins Struck by the Atábeks of Irak by English antiquary and numismatist William S. W. Vaux (1818 –1885).

Honoré Théodoric d'Albert de Luynes. Honoré Théodoric d'Albert de Luynes (1802–1867), a French nobleman, archaeologist and numismatist.

- Essai sur la numismatique des Satrapies et de la Phénicie sous les rois Achæménides (1846).
- Numismatique et inscriptions cypriotes (1852).
- Voyage d'exploration à la mer Morte, à Petra et sur la rive gauche du Jordan (published posthumously).
- Catalogue de la Collection de Luynes, 3 volumes (1924).

William S. W. Vaux. William Sandys Wright Vaux (1818 –1885), an English antiquary and numismatist.

- The Numismatic Chronicle (1839). By W. S. W. Vaux, et al.
- Coins Struck by the Atábeks of Irak (1848). In The History of the Atábeks of Syria and Persia, by Mīr-Khvānd, translated by English orientalist William H. Morley.

Louis Félicien de Saulcy. Louis Félicien de Saulcy (1807–1880), a French historian, numismatist and archaeologist.

- Numismatique des croisades (1847). A pioneering work on the coins of the Crusader era.

Gustave Schlumberger. Gustave Schlumberger (1844-1929), a French historian and numismatist who specialized on the Crusades and the Byzantine Empire.

- Numismatique des croisades. Monnaie inédite des seigneurs du Toron en Syrie (1875).
- Sigillographie de l'Orient latin (1877). Continued by French Byzantinist Ferdinand Chalandon (1875–1921).
- Numismatique de l'Orient Latin, 2 volumes (1878–1882). The principal work on the coinage of the Crusades.
- La Vierge, le Christ, les saints sur les sceaux byzantins des Xe, XIe et XIIe siècles (1883).
- Sigillographie de l'empire byzantin (1884). A compendium of Byzantine seals.
- Renaud de Châtillon, prince d'Antioche, seigneur de la terre d'Outre-Jourdain (1898). A biography of Raynald of Châtillon.
- Expédition des "Almugavares" ou routiers Catalans en Orient de l'an 1302 à l'an 1311 (1902). A history of the Catalan Company during the expedition of the Almogavars from 1301 to 1311.
- Campagnes du roi Amaury Ier de Jérusalem en Egypte, au XIIe siècle (1906).
- Prise de Saint-Jean-d'Acre, en l'an 1291 (1914).
- Le siege, la prise et le sac de Constantinople par les Turcs en 1453 (1914).
- Récits des Byzance et des Croisades, 2 volumes (1922–1923).
- Byzance et les croisades, pages médiévales (1927).

Charles Farcinet. Charles Farcinet (1824-1903), a French historian and numismatist.

- Mélanges de numismatique et d'histoire (1895). Mixtures of numismatics and history. The feudal coins of Poitou.
- Les anciens sires de Lusignan (1897). The former lords of Lusignan, Geoffroy la Grand'Dent (Geoffrey II of Lusignan) and the counts of La Marche: historical research on the Middle Ages in Poitou. Includes the Testament on Geoffrey II of Lusignan (1198–1247), by Jean Besly.

Paul Balog. Paul Balog (1900–1982), an Italian Islamic numismatist and archaeologist.

- Monnaies à lé genres arabes de l'Orient latin (1958). By Paul Balog and Jacques Yvon (1923–1983). The standard reference for the classifications of coins in Arabic from the Crusader era.
- The Coinage of the Mamluk Sultans of Egypt and Syria (1964), both regarded as classic studies in Islamic numismatics.
- Umayyad, ʻĀbbasid, and Ṭūlūnid glass weights and vessel stamps (1976).
- The Coinage of the Ayyubids (1980).

Louise Buenger Robbert. Louise Buenger Robbert, an American historian and numismatist, with an emphasis on medieval Venice.

- The Venetian money market, 1150-1229 (1971).
- Reorganization of the Venetian coinage by Doge Enrico Dandolo (1974).
- Venice and the Crusades (1985). In the Wisconsin Collaborative History of the Crusades, Volume V, The Impact of the Crusades on the Near East.

John Porteous. John Porteous (20th century), a British numismatist.

- Crusader Coinage with Greek or Latin Inscriptions (1989). In the Wisconsin Collaborative History of the Crusades, Volume VI. The Impact of the Crusades on Europe.
- Corpus of Coins (1989). In the Wisconsin Collaborative History of the Crusades, Volume VI. The Impact of the Crusades on Europe.

Michael L. Brown. Michael L. Brown (20th century), an American numismatist.

- Crusader Coinage with Arabic Inscriptions (1989). With British numismatist D. M. Metcalf. In the Wisconsin Collaborative History of the Crusades, Volume VI. The Impact of the Crusades on Europe.
- List of Coins Illustrated (1989). With British numismatist D. M. Metcalf. In the Wisconsin Collaborative History of the Crusades, Volume VI. The Impact of the Crusades on Europe.

== See also ==
- Biblical archaeology
- Cartography of Jerusalem
- Cartography of Palestine
- Christian holy places
- Palestine Pilgrims' Text Society (PPTS).
