= Historians and histories of the Crusades =

Historians and historical works concerning the Crusades

Historians and histories of the Crusades identifies the sets of histories and their authors (when known) concerning the Crusades that were conducted from 1095 through the 16th century. Reflecting what Crusader historians have typically considered, works written as early as the 4th century may also be relevant, particularly in the history of the Holy Land and Christian pilgrimages. This discussion is divided into the following eight parts:

- List of Crusades to Europe and the Holy Land
- List of sources for the Crusades to the Holy Land
- List of late medieval works on the Crusades
- List of collections of Crusader sources
- List of early modern works on the Crusades
- List of modern historians of the Crusades
- List of works about the archaeology, cartography and numismatics of the Crusades
- Historical sources of the Crusades: pilgrimages and exploration
- Bibliography of the Crusades: modern works.

The first of these provides the chronology of the Crusades, with key histories associated with each major event (beginning with the First Crusade) and is a guide to the subsequent parts. The original sources for the Crusades are those documents generally written by contemporaneous participants. In later centuries, these sources were provided in collections that have served as the basis for subsequent histories. The later historians are those that prepared histories from the 13th century through the 19th century. Modern histories are those that were written after 1900, many of which are in widespread use today. Separate sections on sources on speciality subjects such as archaeology and travelogues relevant to the Crusades are included. The various bibliographies on the Crusades are also discussed below.

== Crusades to Europe and the Holy Land ==
The Crusades began with the First Crusade (1095–1099) that resulted in the formation of the Kingdom of Jerusalem. Crusades in the Holy Land (or Levant) continued until the siege of Acre in 1291, when the Western nations were expelled from the region. Crusades continued in the Mediterranean, including Cyprus and Rhodes, until 1578, primarily pitting the West against the Ottoman Empire. Crusades in other theaters including northern Europe, Iberia, Italy and the Balkans also occurred. Other crusades were conducted for political or other reasons. This chronology identifies those conflicts identified as crusades by scholars, and provides the principal documents on each such crusade. This list follows various chronologies that are available from current historical studies.

== Sources for the Crusades ==
The source documents for the Crusades are generally those accounts of the events that were contemporaneously written. For the First Crusade, the most important of these are documented in the Recueil des historiens des croisades (RHC) and other collections. In their widely-read encyclopedia articles, English political scientist Ernest Barker (1874–1960) and French historian Louis R. Bréhier (1869–1951) identified the important Western, Greek, Arabic and Armenian sources of Crusader history, pilgrimage accounts, ecclesiastical works, letters and correspondence, and archaeological and numismatics studies as a key for historical understanding of the Crusades.

== Late medieval works on the Crusades ==
Later medieval authors that wrote of the Crusades worked primarily from original sources rather than first-hand experience. The first known example is Liber recuperations Terre Sancte (1291) by Franciscan friar Fidentius of Padua, and early historians generally combined their histories with calls for new crusades to the Holy Land or against the Ottoman Empire. General histories were rare through the 16th century, with works focused on more religious, regional or biographical aspects. The work La Gerusalemme liberata (Jerusalem Delivered) by Italian poet Torquato Tasso remained one of the most widely read work on the subject for two centuries.

== Collections of Crusader sources ==
In order to provide more complete histories, collections of Crusader sources were assembled in multiple-volume sets beginning in the 14th century and continuing into the 19th century. The practice was begun with the Rothelin Continuation of the work of William of Tyre and Les Gestes des Chiprois in the 14th century. This was continued by the 1611 work Gesta Dei per Francos (God's Work through the Franks) by Jacques Bongars and the work of the Congregation of Saint Maur. The most important of these works is the Recueil des historiens des croisades (RHC) published from 1841 to 1906, covering the legal documents of Jerusalem, Western sources, Oriental (Arabic) sources, Greek sources and Armenian sources. Later collections with a large component of Crusader works include the Monumenta Germaniae Historica (MGH), the Revue de l'Orient Latin/Archives de l’Orient Latin (ROL/AOL) and the Rolls Series. Other collections that are of interest to the Crusader period include the Patrologia Latina (MPL), Patrologia Graeco-Latina (MPG), Patrologia Orientalis (PO), Corpus Scriptorum Christianorum Orientalium (CSCO) and the library of the Palestine Pilgrims' Text Society (PPTS).

== Early modern works on the Crusades ==
The Historie of the Holy Warre (1639) by English churchman Thomas Fuller provides the first comprehensive view of the Crusades. Other famous names were also drawn to the subject, including Martin Luther, Francis Bacon, Gottfried Wilhelm (von) Leibniz, and David Hume. Edward Gibbon's History of the Decline and Fall of the Roman Empire (1776–1789) remains a readable if somewhat dated history, as does Histoire des Croisades by Voltaire. Arab historians were notably absent after the 15th century, not returning for almost four centuries. The nineteenth century brought an explosion of French, English, German and, later, American, historians, led Joseph François Michaud's Histoire des Croisades and Reinhold Röhricht, a German historian of the Crusades. Popular work of art and fiction such as the Salles des Croisades (Hall of Crusades) and Sir Walter Scott's Ivanhoe are often cited by historians as relevant to the study of the Crusades.

== Modern historians of the Crusades ==
Modern histories of the Crusades began with the publication off J. B. Bury's The Cambridge Medieval History and include works by specialists such as Swiss oriental scholar Titus Tobler, and French historian and numismatist Gustave Schlumberger as well as such figures as T. E. Lawrence and Winston Churchill. It was in the early 20th century that the first of the modern histories that are in use today began to appear. the include Steven Runciman's A History of the Crusades and the Wisconsin Collaborative History of the Crusades. Others include British medieval historian Thomas S. Asbridge, American Persian historian Farhad Daftary, Scottish historian H. A. R. Gibb, British Islamic scholar Carole Hillenbrand, British-American orientalist Bernard Lewis, French medievalist Jean Barthélémy Richard, British historian Jonathan Riley-Smith and British historian Christopher Tyerman.

== Archaeology, cartography and numismatics ==
Historians of the Crusades in the areas of archaeology, cartography and numismatics include those authors whose scientific work in the areas of archaeological exploration; historical geography and cartography; numismatics and sigillography; and document analysis techniques.

- Archaeological disciplines have contributed to the understanding of the history of the Crusades by verifying or refuting accounts presented in original sources. Particular emphasis has been on Crusader castles, history of the art of the period, and document analysis techniques such as palaeography, diplomatics and epigraphy.
- Historical cartography, geography and topography are important sources in the study of the history of the Crusades. Some of the more important authors and their works are presented below, supplementing works that are essentially travelers' accounts.
- The disciples of numismatics, the study of coins and other money, and sigillography, the study of seals of Byzantium and the Latin East, play an important role in interpreting histories. The coinage of Outremer that has been studied are the coins of the Kingdom of Jerusalem, the Frankish Syria, and those of the Islamic world, including Frankish imitations.

== Pilgrimages and exploration ==
The historical sources of the Crusades derived from pilgrimages and exploration include those authors whose work describes pilgrimages to the Holy Land and other explorations to the Middle East and Asia that are relevant to Crusader history. In his seminal encyclopedia article, Dominican friar and historian Bede Jarrett (1881–1934) wrote on the subject of Pilgrimage and identified that the "Crusades also naturally arose out of the idea of pilgrimages." This was reinforced by the Reverend Florentine Stanislaus Bechtel in his article Itineraria in the same encyclopedia. Pilgrims, missionaries and other travelers to the Holy Land have documented their experiences through accounts of travel and even guides of sites to visit. Many of these have been recognized by historians, for example the travels of ibn Jubayr and Marco Polo. Some of the more important travel accounts are listed here. Many of these are also of relevance to the study of historical geography and some can be found in the Recueil des historiens des croisades (RHC), Corpus Scriptorum Eccesiasticorum Latinorum (CSEL), particularly CSEL 39, Itinerarium Hierosolymitana, and publications of the Palestine Pilgrims' Text Society (PPTS) and the Hakluyt Society. Much of this information is from the seminal work of 19th-century scholars and explorers such as Edward Robinson, Titus Tobler and Richard Francis Burton.

== Bibliographies ==
Bibliographies of Crusader histories and other documentation have been extant since the early 19th century. These include stand-alone works as well as bibliographies provided as part of an overall history. No two are alike, each representing the views of their authors and the time period of their creation. Some of the more important ones are listed below in no particular order.

The Runciman bibliographies. Each of the three volumes of Steven Runciman's A History of the Crusades, published in 1951, 1952 and 1954, includes a discussion on original sources for that volume plus a bibliography consisting of collections, original sources and modern works. Note that these bibliographies are not available in the online versions of the books.

The Routledge bibliography. The Routledge Companion to the Crusades (2006) by Peter Lock includes as Part VII the Select Bibliography of Publications Mainly in English. It is an extensive bibliography of: Collections of sources in translation; Specific sources in translation; Principal editions of selected Western primary sources; and Secondary sources.

Wisconsin collaborative bibliographies. The History of the Crusades, 6 volumes (1969–1989), published under the general editorship of Kenneth M. Setton, includes the following bibliographies.

- Select Bibliography of the Crusades, Volume VI (1989). Edited by Hans E. Mayer and Joyce McLellan. Bibliography of Crusades historiography, original sources, collections, narrative works, documents and secondary sources. This is an expansion of Mayer's Bibliographie zur Geschichte der Kreuzzüge (1960).
- Topic Bibliographies. Each chapter has an extensive bibliography at the start of the writeup.

The Murray bibliographies. The Crusades—An Encyclopedia by Alan V. Murray contains an extensive general bibliography as well as specific sources for each of the encyclopedia articles. These are only available in the print version of the work, and include the following.

- Bibliographies, including Atlases; Reference Works; Periodicals; Surveys of Research; Collections of Essays; The Crusades: General Histories; The Crusades: Origins; The Muslim World; The Byzantine World; Outremer and Cyprus; The Latin Empire of Constantinople and Frankish Greece; Iberia; and, The Baltic Lands and Russia.
- Topic Bibliographies. In addition to the general bibliography, each article has a topic-specific bibliography.

The Riley-Smith bibliographies. Crusades historian Jonathan Riley-Smith has published as number of bibliographies associated with his works.

- The Oxford History of the Crusades (1995). Not a bibliography per se, but rather a list for further reading.
- The First Crusaders (1997). A comprehensive bibliography of the First Crusades through 1129.
- The Atlas of the Crusades (1999). A list for further reading.

Encyclopedia articles. The three major encyclopedia articles published in the late 19th and early 20th centuries include bibliographies that focus primarily on original sources and historians in vogue at the time. They include the following.

- Schaff-Herzog Encyclopaedia of Religious Knowledge (1884). Edited by Swiss theologian and ecclesiastical historian Philip Schaff, the article on the Crusades includes an extensive bibliography.
- Crusades (Bibliography and Sources) (1908). By French historian Louis R. Bréhier. In the Catholic Encyclopedia.
- Crusades (1911). By English political scientist Ernest Barker. In the 11th edition of the Encyclopædia Britannica. A summary of the history of the Crusades, with a section on the Literature of Crusades.
- The Crusades (1923). A later edition of the Encyclopædia Britannica article, edited with additional notes.

Other bibliographies. Other bibliographies include the following.

- An Attempt at a Bibliography of Cyprus, 1 volume, Nicosia (1889). Edited by English historian Claude D. Cobham. A comprehensive bibliography of Cypriot history over 700 documents cited, supplementing the one in Cobham's Excerpta Cypria.
- Bibliography of English translations from Medieval Sources (1946). By historians Austin P. Evans and Clarissa Palmer Farrar.
- Bibliotheca geographica Palaestinae, 1 volume, Berlin (1890). Edited by Reinhold Röhricht. Subtitled Chronologisches Verzeichniss der auf die Geographie des heiligen Landes bezüglichen Literatur von 333 bis 1878 und Versuch einer Cartographie, it provides the summaries of 3515 books on the geography of the Holy Land issued between 355 and 1878.
- Bibliothèque des Croisades, 4 volumes, Paris (1829). Edited by French historians Joseph Fr. Michaud and Joseph T. Reinaud. A comprehensive bibliography of works related to the Crusades.
- Byzantine Sources in Translation, Internet History Sourcebooks Project, Fordham University, New York (2019). Lists of available translations of Byzantine sources in Western European languages.
- Geschichte des ersten Kreuzzuges (History and Literature of the Crusades), 1 volume, Düsseldorf, new edition Leipzig (1841, 1881). Edited by German historian Heinrich von Sybel (1817–1895), translated by English author Lucie, Lady Duff-Gordon (1821–1869). A history and bibliography of the Crusades through the Third Crusade.
- God's War: A New History of the Crusades (2006), by Crusades historian Christopher Tyerman, does not contain a bibliography per se, but the sections Notes and Further Reading provide a wealth of bibliographic material on the Crusades, including sources and secondary works. Only available in the print edition.
- The Crusade: Historiography and Bibliography (1962). Edited by Egyptian Coptic historian Aziz S. Atiya. A bibliography of Crusader texts with an emphasis on Islamic texts.
- The Crusades: Bibliography (2001, last updated 2019), by Paul Halsall. A comprehensive bibliography, but with many of the links outdated. In Fordham University's Internet Medieval Sourcebook.

== See also ==
- Art of the Crusades
- Chronologies of the Crusades
- Crusader States
- Crusades
- Historiography of the Crusades
- Islamic view on the Crusades
- List of Crusader Castles
- List of Later Historians of the Crusades
- Military History of the Crusader States
- Military Orders of the Crusades
