= Tractatus de locis et statu sancte terre ierosolimitane =

Start of the Tractatus indicated by a rubric in the manuscript Clm 4351

The Tractatus de locis et statu sancte terre ierosolimitane is a short anonymous Latin treatise on the geography and ethnography of the Kingdom of Jerusalem written in the late 12th or early 13th century. It was an influential and widely used tract.

It places the "land of Jerusalem" (terra ierosolimitana) at the centre of the world and describes it in detail. It lists its neighbours, the various Christian denominations living in it and the different groups of Europeans. It describes the special status of the Pisan, Genoese and Venetian communities within the kingdom. It contains a short description of the Hospitallers, a lengthy description of the Templars and a detailed description of the Latin ecclesiastical structure in the kingdom. The Christian holy places are listed in the sequence in which they appear in the ministry of Jesus. The names of the kingdom's main cities at different times are listed. The physical geography, fauna and fruit-bearing trees of the kingdom are given.

At the end of the treatise, the feudal structure of the kingdom is detailed, including the king's coronation oath and the service that the barons of the kingdom owe. The most important barons and the number of knights they were required to supply are given. The Principality of Antioch and the County of Tripoli are described as beyond the kingdom's borders, but its vassals nevertheless. Finally, the non-Christian inhabitants of the kingdom are noted. In content and structure, the Tractatus is utterly unlike contemporary pilgrimage accounts.

The date of the text is disputed. Hans Eberhard Mayer dated it no more precisely than to the late 12th century, without stating his reasons. Its most recent editor, Benjamin Kedar, dates it on internal grounds to between 1168 and 1187. He rejects its reference to the coronation of King Leo I of Armenia in 1198 as a later addition to the text. Paolo Trovato, on the other hand, dates it to after 1198 on philological grounds.

== Manuscripts ==
The Tractatus is found in whole or in part in at least nine manuscripts:

- London, British Library, Royal 14.C.X — from the first half of the 13th century, presents a medieval critical edition
- Cambridge, Magdalene College, F.4.22 — from the first half of the 13th century, presents a medieval critical edition
- Munich, Bayerische Staatsbibliothek, Clm 17060 — from the early 13th century
- Heiligenkreuz, Stiftsbibliothek, 88 — from the 13th century, incomplete
- Berlin, Preussische Staatsbibliothek, Görres 111 — from the 13th century, fragmentary
- Charleville-Mézières, Bibliothèque municipale, 275 — from the first quarter of the 14th century
- Munich, Bayerische Staatsbibliothek, Clm 4351 — from the 15th century
- Munich, Bayerische Staatsbibliothek, Clm 5307 — from the 15th century
- Verona, Biblioteca Capitolare, CCCXVII — an abbreviated copy made by Felice Feliciano in 1458

== Bibliography ==
- Kedar, Benjamin Z. (2016) [1998]. "The Tractatus de locis et statu sancte terre ierosolimitane". In John France; William G. Zajac (eds.). The Crusades and Their Sources: Essays Presented to Bernard Hamilton. Routledge. pp. 111–133.
- Rubin, Jonathan (2018). Learning in a Crusader City: Intellectual Activity and Intercultural Exchanges in Acre, 1191–1291. Cambridge University Press.
- Trovato, Paolo (2014). Everything You Always Wanted to Know about Lachmann's Method: A Non-Standard Handbook of Genealogical Textual Criticism in the Age of Post-Structuralism, Cladistics, and Copy-Text. Translated by Federico Poole. Libreria Universitaria.
