= William Hook Morley =

William Hook Morley (3 August 1814 – 21 May 1860) was an English barrister and orientalist.

== Life ==
The second son of George Morley of the Inner Temple, he entered the Middle Temple on 17 August 1833. He was called to the bar 12 January 1838.

Morley was a trustee of the Royal Asiatic Society, and during the last year of his life also its librarian. He died at 35 Brompton Square, London, on 21 May 1860.

== Works ==
Morley in 1838 discovered a missing manuscript of the Jami' al-tawarikh of Rashid-al-Din Hamadani, making something of a reputation. He published:

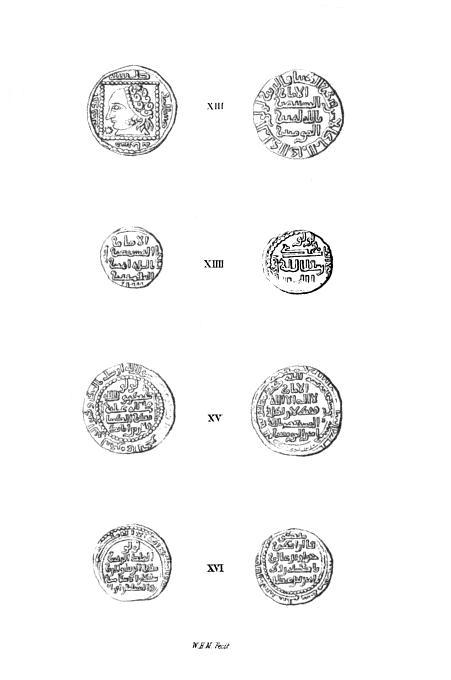
Plate of Atabeg coins from History of the Atábeks of Syria and Persia

- "Letters to the Secretary of the Royal Asiatic Society, by W. Morley, Esq., and Professor Duncan Forbes, on the Discovery of part of the Second Volume of the 'Jami al Tawarikh,' supposed to be lost." The Journal of the Royal Asiatic Society of Great Britain and Ireland vol. 6, no. 1 (1841), pp. 11-41.
- A Digest of Cases decided in the Supreme Courts of India (London, 2 vols. 1849–50; new ser. vol. i. only, 1852)
- Catalogue of the Historical Manuscripts in the Arabic and Persian Languages in the possession of the Royal Asiatic Society (London, 1854)
- "A description (1856) of a planispheric astrolabe constructed for Sultan Husayn
- The Administration of Justice in British India, its past History and present State, comprising an Account of the Laws peculiar to India. London: Williams and Norgate, 1858.

Morley also edited in 1848, for the Society for the Publication of Oriental Texts, Mir Khwand's History of the Atábeks of Syria and Persia, with a description of Atabeg coins by William Sandys Vaux.
