= Archaeoseismology =

Study of past earthquakes

Archaeoseismology is the study of ancient earthquakes by analysis of archaeological sites before Robert Mallet's protomodern seismology in the mid-19th century. Such analyses reveal information about seismic events that was not historically recorded before the advent of seismometers in the late 19th century. Such data can also help to document seismic risk in areas subject to brutally destructive earthquakes. In 1991, an international conference in Athens marked the beginning of modern research in the field of archaeoseismology, described as a "study of ancient earthquakes, and their social, cultural, historical and natural effects".

== The main idea ==
Earthquakes in the distant past may provide important information for a regional seismic risk assessment. We have quantitative data concerning past earthquakes only from the beginning of the 20th century (as the seismograph was invented only at the end of the 19th century), but humanity has had to deal with earthquakes throughout its existence. Thus we have extremely limited historical information about seismic risks. A methodology for reconstruction of historical earthquakes was held during the 20th century, but with very limited results, especially for archaic earthquakes. Thus research in archaeological sites is needed to try to identify damage and destruction from ancient earthquakes.

== Archaeological record ==
The archaeological record can carry three different types of evidence of seismic activity:

- The archaeological remains are displaced due to the movement of an active fault.
- The remains and artefacts contained in destruction deposits, associated with the decline of soil or seismic vibration, can be used in the dating of earthquake damage. Other archaeological evidence, such as repairs, abandonment of an archaeological site or architectural changes, can help in identifying ancient earthquakes.
- Αncient buildings and other man-made structures can be studied for signs of ancient seismic disaster, often associated with soil vibration.

== Notable events ==
- A key example of an ancient earthquake is the 226 BC Rhodes earthquake, which toppled one the seven wonders of the world at the time, the Colossus of Rhodes. It is also noted that damage to the city and harbor were evident. The Greek historian Strabo discussed the collapse of the colossus in the 1st century BC.
- A more studied example is The Great Chilean Earthquake of 1960, which was the most powerful earthquake in recorded history, at 9.6 on the moment magnitude scale.
- The first recorded earthquake was the Mount Tai earthquake in China in 1831 BC.

== See also ==
- Paleoseismology
- Historical earthquakes
