= Islamic views on the crusades =

There was little interest in the crusades in Islamic culture prior to the 20th century. But since the 1950s, the crusades have become an ideological staple in Salafism and jihadism.

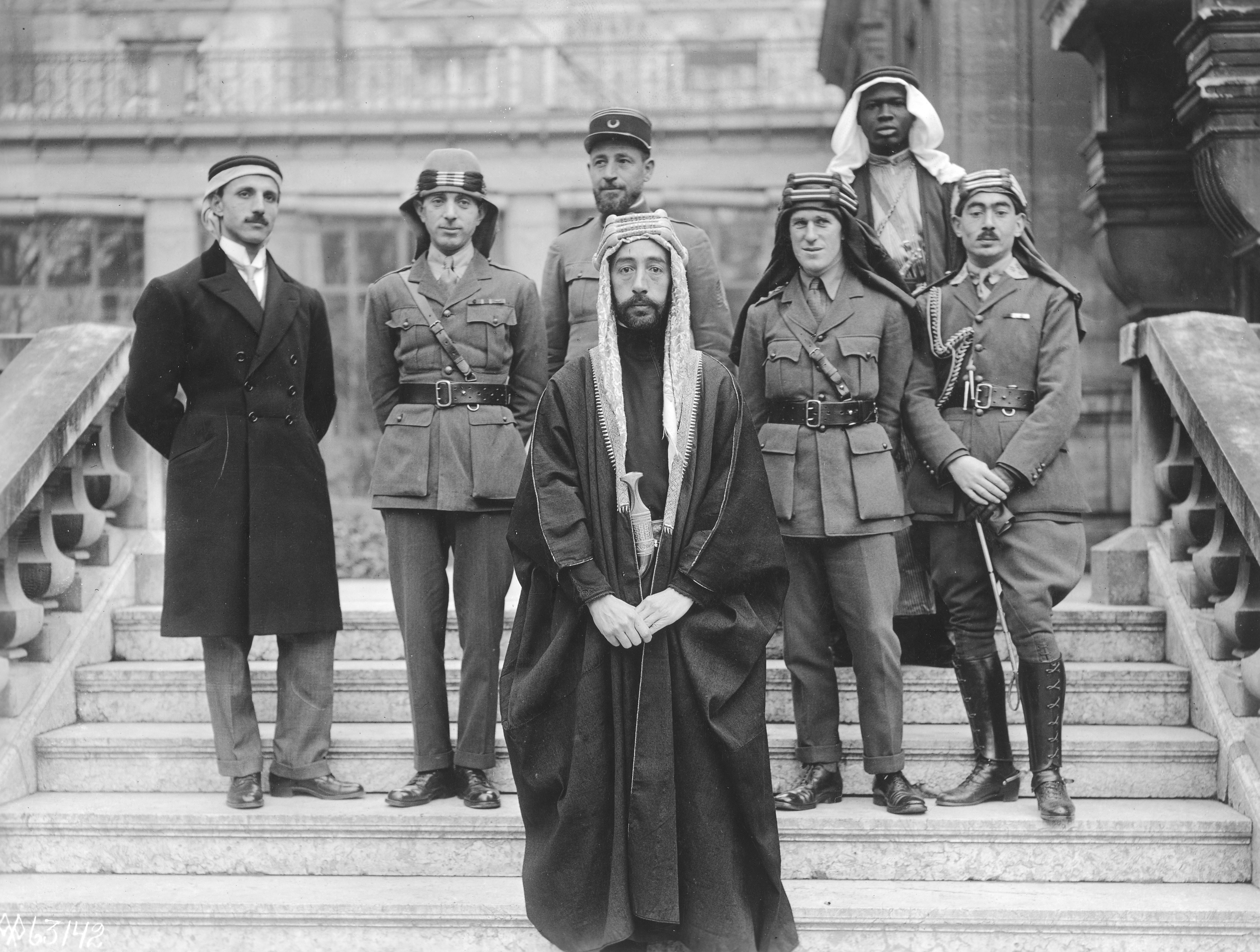
Faisal I Ibn Hussein reminded French minister Stéphen Pichon about the failure of the Crusades at Paris Peace Conference (1919-1920)

== From 19th century to 1918 ==
Many appeals to the Crusades are found in the works of the pan-Islamists and Arab Nationalists of the al-Nahda period. Despite differing views on how to reform the life in the Islamic world, Jamal al-Din al-Afghani and Abd al-Rahman al-Kawakibi instilled the same image of the Crusades in their readers: they interpreted the arrival of the Franks from the West as retribution for the distortion of Islam. Jamal al-Din al-Afghani, Muhammad Abduh, and Mustafa Kamil applied the concept of the Crusade to contemporary military-political conflicts between Christian and Muslim nations - such as the confrontation between the Ottoman Empire and Europe, the Crimean War, and the Mahdist uprising in Sudan. Pointing out that religious fanaticism is alien to Islam, Abd al-Rahman al-Kawakibi argued that it was introduced to the Middle East by the Crusaders, effectively portraying the Crusades as the moment this "virus" arrived from Europe. Jamal al-Din al-Afghani, Muhammad Abduh, and Rafiq al-Azm viewed the era of the Crusades as a catalyst for the West's future prosperity and progress, attributing this development to the civilizing influence of Muslim culture that the Crusaders brought back to Europe. Rafiq al-Azm and Abd al-Hamid al-Zahrawi cited the Crusades as an example of religion's weakness as a unifying force, noting that even when the Crusaders posed a threat to all Muslims in the Middle East and to Muslim holy sites, the Muslims failed to unite to confront the danger together.

== From 1918 to 1948 ==
Seeking historical precedents to mobilize the masses for the anti-colonial struggle, Arab public, political, and religious figures between 1918 and 1948 frequently turned to the history of the Crusades; in doing so, they both expanded upon interpretations proposed by figures from the 19th and early 20th centuries, such as Jamal al-Din al-Afghani, Muhammad Abduh and Abd al-Rahman al-Kawakibi, and identified new contexts and reasons for invoking that historical era. Following World War I, Arab public, political, and religious figures began—for the first time—to critique European interpretations of the events and consequences of the Crusades, challenging European attempts to legitimize their presence in the Arab world by referencing that historical period. Such criticism was voiced not only in opinion pieces and public speeches but also in high-level official political discourse, such as in the case of Faisal I Ibn Husayn, who appealed to the Crusades at Paris Peace Conference (1919–1920). The Islamiс thinkers like Rashid Rida and Hasan al-Banna also addressed the Crusades, naming this epoch as the time when Europe saw a true civilization in the Islamic world, or applying the term 'new crusade' on the struggle in the British Mandate Palestine.

Arab public figures also viewed the disastrous outcome of the Crusades for Europe as a warning to contemporary European colonialists, while the victories of the Muslim commanders who drove the Crusaders out of the Middle East were seen as examples for the Arab politicians of their own time to emulate. However, the shift from "anti-Crusader rhetoric" to anti-Christian sentiment in the speeches of certain Arab nationalists caused rifts within their ranks, as Christian Arabs perceived this as their exclusion from the national struggle. Meanwhile, Maronite Christians invoked the history of the Crusades to affirm their long-standing ties to France and secure its support.

== Arab historiography ==
The crusaders of the 12th century mostly fought the Turkish Seljuks, and later the Ayyubid dynasty, and were thus indirectly (and intermittently directly) allied with the Arab Abbasid Caliphate. For this reason, according to Hillenbrand (2000), Arab historians tended to align with a western viewpoint, discussing the "Frankish wars" in the context of their own fight against the Turkic expansion. Phillips (2005) summarizes the general indifference by stating that "most Muslims" see the Crusades as "just another invasion among many in their history". Contemporary Islamic accounts did not recognise any religious or military motive for the Crusaders, who instead were simply viewed as arriving from nowhere before wreaking havoc upon Muslims. The veneration of Saladin as chivalrous opponent of the Crusaders likewise finds no reflection in Islamic tradition before the visit of German Emperor Wilhelm II to Saladin's tomb in 1898. The visit, coupled with anti-imperialist sentiments, led nationalist Arabs to reinvent the image of Saladin and portray him as a hero of the struggle against the West. The image of Saladin they used was the romantic one created by Walter Scott and other Europeans in the West at the time. It replaced Saladin's reputation as a figure who had been largely forgotten in the Muslim world, eclipsed by more successful figures such as Baybars of Egypt. Modern Arab states have sought to commemorate Saladin through various measures, often based on the image created of him in the 19th-century west.

== Modern salafism ==
Renewed interest in the period is comparatively recent, arising in the context of modern salafi propaganda calling for war on the Western "crusaders".

The term ṣalībiyyūn "crusader", a 19th-century loan translation from Western historiography, is now in common use as a pejorative; Salafi preacher Wagdy Ghoneim has used it interchangeably with naṣārā and masīḥiyyīn as a term for Christians in general.

The Partition of the Ottoman Empire was, at the time, popularly depicted as a final triumph in the long history of the crusades against Islam: The London Punch magazine published a drawing of King Richard the Lionheart watching the post-WWI British army entering Jerusalem with the caption, “At last, my dream come true.” In a similar fashion, when the French General Henri Gouraud took command of Syria, he remarked, “Behold Saladin, we have returned." Madden (1999) argued that this European romanticising connection of the crusades with contemporary colonialism was what has "reshaped the Muslim memory" of the medieval crusades. Beginning in the 1950s, following the influential History of the Crusades by Steven Runciman, western intellectual mainstream tended to depict the crusades as a shameful episode of colonialism. This, once again, tended to influence Muslim perception of the period, fuelling Arab nationalism and Islamist propagandistic depictions of westerners as hostile invaders:

"Arab nationalists and Islamists agreed fully with this [Runcimann's] interpretation of the crusades. Poverty, corruption, and violence in the Middle East were said to be the lingering effects of the crusades and subsequent European colonialism." (Madden, p. 203).

Khashan (1997) has argued that the revival of "crusading" narrative in the west is connected with the end of the Cold War and the search for a new "good vs. evil" dichotomy in which to cast world politics. Khan (2003) argues that the contemporary jihadist propaganda is substantially derived from the writings of early Islamists like Sayyid Qutb and Abul Ala Maududi who were educated in Western institutions in the 1950s and thus submerged in the "politically correct" narrative following Runcimann which was current in western academia at the time. The "crusader" rhetoric was fully developed in Islamist extremism and Jihadism by the end of the 1990s. Notably, a fatwa signed by Osama bin Laden and Ayman al-Zawahiri in 1998 called for jihad against "the crusader-Zionist alliance" (referring to the United States and Israel). By 2008, The Oxford Encyclopedia of the Islamic World claimed that "many Muslims consider the Crusades to be a symbol of Western hostility toward Islam".

== See also ==
- Historiography of the Crusades
