= William Sandys Wright Vaux =

English antiquary

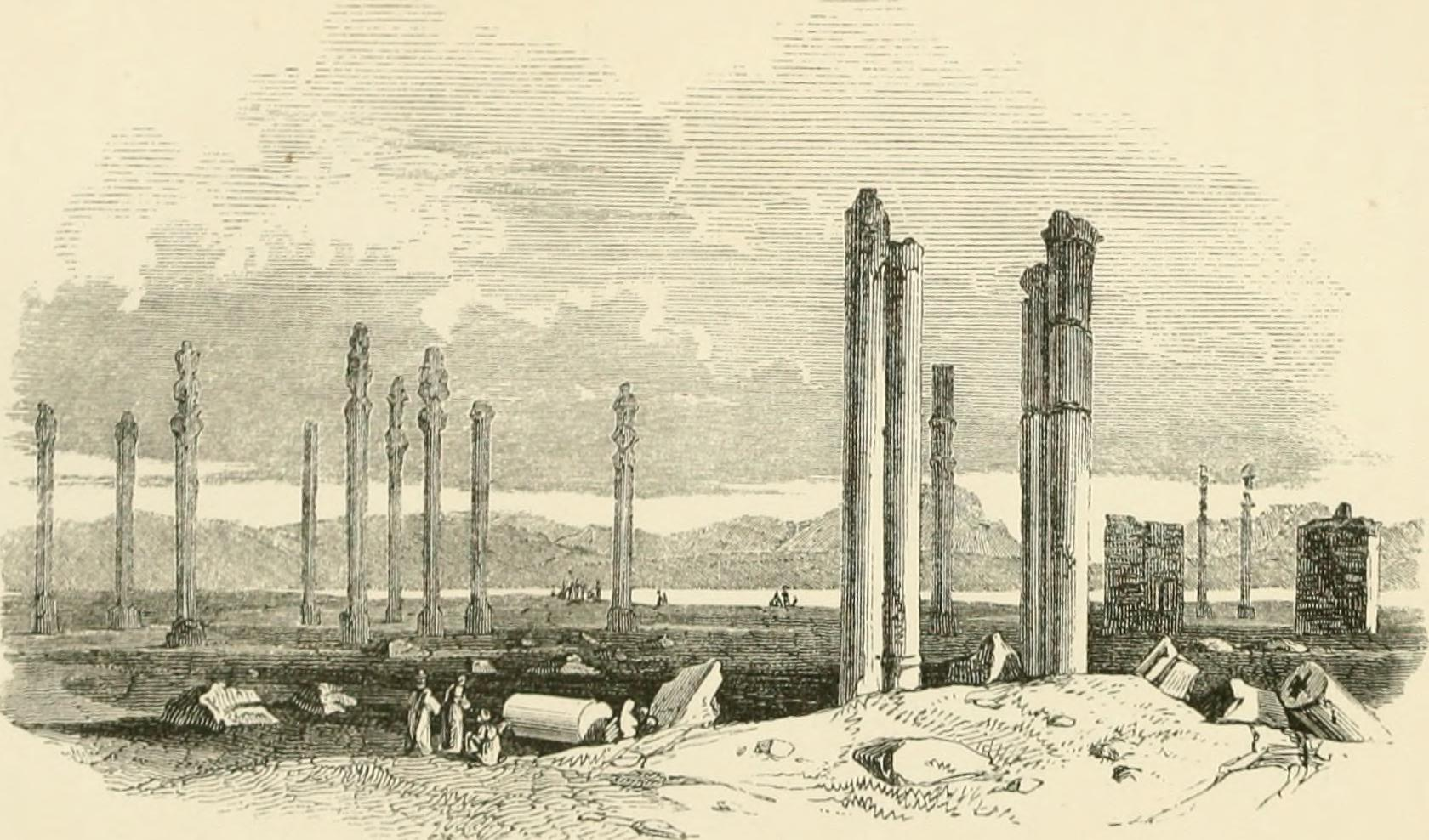
Nineveh and Persepolis, by William Sandys Wright Vaux.

William Sandys Wright Vaux FRS (28 February 1818 – 21 June 1885), was an English antiquary and numismatist of the 19th century.

== Biography ==
Vaux was born in 1818 in Oxford. He was the only son of William Vaux (d. 1844), prebendary of Winchester Cathedral and vicar of Wanborough, Wiltshire. He was educated at Westminster School from 1831 to 1836, and matriculated from Balliol College, Oxford, on 18 March 1836, graduating BA 1840 and M.A. 1842.

In 1841 he entered the department of antiquities of the British Museum, and in January 1861 became the keeper of the department of coins and medals, a post which, owing to ill-health, he resigned in October 1870.

He was connected with the early development of the Oxford Movement in London, and his rooms were a frequent place of meeting for the sub-committees connected with the London Church Union and the foreign chaplaincies. From 1871 to 1876 he was engaged in cataloguing the coins in the Bodleian Library. From 1846 he was a member of the Numismatic Society, and — according to the Dictionary of National Biography — to his friendly care much of the success of that body is due. In 1852 he became one of the secretaries, and for some time assisted John Yonge Akerman in editing the first series of the Numismatic Chronicle, in which he himself wrote twenty-five papers. In 1855 he was elected president, and remained in office until 1874. For many years the society met in his rooms in Gate Street, Lincoln's Inn Fields. On 4 June 1868 he became a fellow of the Royal Society. From November 1875 to his death he was the secretary of the Royal Asiatic Society, and for many years secretary to the Royal Society of Literature.

Vaux became a member of the Canterbury Association on 5 April 1850.

He died at 102 Cheyne Walk, Chelsea, London, on 21 June 1885, having married on 11 July 1861 Louisa, eldest daughter of Francis Rivington of Harley Street, London.

== Works ==
Vaux's knowledge was large and varied, more especially in all that related to oriental antiquities. His Nineveh and Persepolis: an Historical Sketch of Ancient Assyria and Persia, with an Account of the recent Researches in those Countries (1850; 4th ed. 1855), did much to popularise the discoveries of Layard and other travellers.

He also wrote:

1. Handbook to the Antiquities in the British Museum: a Description of the Remains of Greek, Assyrian, Egyptian, and Etruscan Art, 1851.
2. Ancient History from the Monuments; Persia from the earliest Period to the Arab Conquest, 1875: new edition by Prof. A. H. Sayce, 1893.
3. Ancient History from the Monuments: Greek Cities and Islands of Asia Minor, 1877.

In 1854 he edited The World Encompassed by Sir Francis Drake for the Hakluyt Society.

== Notes ==
- This article incorporates text from a publication now in the public domain: "Vaux, William Sandys Wright". Dictionary of National Biography. London: Smith, Elder & Co. 1885–1900.
