= List of early modern works on the Crusades =

The list of early modern works on the Crusades identifies the historians of the early modern period and their works related to the Crusades that were published after the Crusader era, beginning in 1500. As such, it provides context for the post-medieval historiography of the Crusades. This includes authors and works from the sixteenth century through the nineteenth century. Works are referenced, where available, to the various national collection of biographies, collections linked to the digital libraries of the University of Michigan's HathiTrust and OCLC's WorldCat, and the bibliographic work of Les Archives de littérature du Moyen Âge (ARLIMA) and Bibliothèque nationale de France (BnF).

== Overview ==
Historians of the Crusades are generally of two types. The first are the authors of works, the original sources, that were done contemporaneously with the historical events. The later works from the early modern period, written in the 16th century through the 19th century, are the subject of this article and include a variety of subjects including:

- General histories and chronologies of the Crusades, either comprehensive studies or ones narrowly targeted.
- Regional histories of Western Europe or the Middle East during the Crusader era and, if relevant, beforehand.
- Ecclesiastical works.
- Works of fiction or art deemed important by modern Crusades historians.

Sources for biographies include the following. The first is Part V: Brief Biographies of Crusade Historians, of The Routledge Companion to the Crusades by historian Peter Lock. Part IV: Historiography, or What Historians have said about the Crusades, of Lock's tome, also provides historical perspectives on the authors and their works. The second is the Historians of the Crusades (2007–2008), an on-line database of scholars working in the field of Crusader studies. The related articles are listed above.

== Sixteenth century ==
The 16th century was marked by two major influences on Crusader histories: the Turkish wars and the Protestant Reformation. The wars with the Ottoman Turks had begun in the 13th century but reached their peak in the 16th. The dichotomy between Protestant and Catholic was reflected in the differing views of the Crusades—an evil arm of the papacy versus meritorious and laudable endeavours. Highlights include:

- Notable histories include those by Basilius Herold, Reiner Reineck (with commentary by Matthäus Dresser), Heinrich Meibom, Justus Lipsius, Di Antonio Mossi and Michele Zappulo. The history of Étienne Pasquier was first to assign numbers to the Crusades.
- Differing views on the Turks and the concept of a Holy War, exemplified by works of Erasmus, Martin Luther, and John Foxe, as well as numerous theological works.
- The work of poet Torquato Tasso was to be at the forefront of Crusader writing for two centuries.
- The struggles of the military orders in Malta, Rhodes and Cyprus against the Ottomans, in the works of John Caius and Uberto Foglietta.

John Caius (fl. 1480), an English poet, also known as John Kay.

- The Delectable Newwesse and Tithynges of the Glorious Victory of the Rhodyans against the Turkes (1506). A translation of Obsidionis Rhodiæ urbis descriptio by Gulielmus Caoursin (1430–1501). Reprinted in Edward Gibbon's The Crusades.

Erasmus (1446–1536), a Dutch philosopher and Christian scholar who was critical of the Western response to the Turkish invasions.

- In Praise of Folly (1509). An important work in the Protestant Reformation, illustrated by Hans Holbein the Younger. Later translation by White Kennett included an epistle of Sir Thomas More and an obituary of Erasmus by Thomas Brown.

Robert Fabyan (died 1513), an English draper of London, sheriff, alderman, and author.

- The New Chronicles of England and France, in two parts (1511). By Robert Fabyan (died 1513). Named by himself The concordance of histories. Edition of 1811 by Sir Henry Ellis reprinted from Pynson's edition of 1516. Sources used by Fabyan include the Brut Chronicle, the Venerable Bede, William of Malmesbury, Ranulf Higden, Henry of Huntingdon, and numerous other contributors to Crusader history.

Martin Luther (1483–1586), a German theologist and seminal figure in the Reformation.

- Explanation of the Ninety-five Theses (1518). Luther argues against resisting the Turks, presented as a scourge intentionally sent by God to sinning Christians. Resisting them would have been equivalent to resisting the will of God, a position that had been initially shared by Erasmus, but was strongly criticized by English philosopher Thomas More.
- On War Against the Turk (1529). Luther changes his position and calls for action against Islam but falls short of calling for a Holy War. Reflected in his later Sermon against the Turk the same year.
- Erhalt uns, Herr, bei deinem Wort (1542), a hymn by Luther for "the children to sing against the two arch-enemies of Christ, and His Holy Church, the Pope and the Turks." Used by Johann Sebastian Bach in his choral cantata Erhalt uns, Herr, bei deinem Wort.

Basilius Johannes Herold. Basilius Johannes Herold (1511–1581), a Swiss theologian and historian.

- De Bello Sacro (1560). An early Protestant history of the Crusades.

John Foxe (1516–1587), an English historian and martyrologist, and prominent influencer in English Protestantism.

- Actes and Monuments, 8 volumes (1563), a work of Protestant history and martyrology, also referred to as Foxe's Book of Martyrs.
- On the History of the Turks (1566), in Volume 4 of Actes and Monuments, supporting war against the infidel.

Just War Theory. The major proponents of the concept of a Just War include Spanish theologian Francisco de Vitoria (1483–1546) in his De Indis De Jure Belli (1542); Italian jurist Alberico Gentili (1552–1608), who write De Jure Belli Commentationes Tres (1588–1589); and Hugo Grotius (1583–1645), a Dutch humanist who wrote De jure belli ac pacis (On the Law of War and Peace) (1625) and Mare Liberum (The Freedom of the Seas) (1609).

Floria Bustron. Floria Bustron (died before 1570), a Cypriot jurist and historian.

- Historia overo commentarii de Cipro (Chronique de l'Ile de Chypre) (before 1570). An account of Cyprus through the sixteenth century, including the trials of the Knights Templar in Cyprus in 1311. Edition of 1884 edited by French historian Louis de Mas Latrie.

Étienne Pasquier (1529–1615), a French lawyer who first assigned numbers to the Crusades, counting six.

- Recherches de la France, 2 volumes (1560). Edited by French writer Léon Feugère (1810–1858). Frankish history beginning with the Gauls. Chapitre XXXII concerns the Crusades.

Lodovico Dolce (1508/10–1568), an Italian man of letters and painting theorist.

- Dialogo di M. Lodovico Dolce, nel quale si ragiona del modo di accrescere e conseruar la memoria (1562). Edited by German Dominican Johann Host von Romberch (c. 1480–1533).
- Giornale delle historia del Mondo (1572). A compendium of notable historical and literary events from the origins of civilization until the 16th century.

Heinrich Meibom (1638–1700), a German physician and scholar.

- Chronologie ad historiam belli sacri (1584). An early history of the Crusades.

Justus Lipsius (1547–1606) was a Flemish philologist, philosopher and humanist.

- Opera Omnia, 4 volumes (1585). His work on the Crusades was epigrammatic and moral in tone, relying heavily on William of Tyre.

Reiner Reineck (1541–1595), a German historian.

- Historia De Vita Imp. Caes. Henrici IIII (1581). A biography of Henry IV of France.
- Chronicon Hierosolymitanum, id est, De bello sacro historia, exposita libris XII & nunc primum in lucem edita (1584). A collection of Crusader sources with a commentary by German historian Matthäus Dresser.
- Historia Orientalis Haythoni Armenii: Et Huic Subiectum Marci Pauli (1585). Itinerarium, item Fragmentum è Speculo historiali Vincentij Beluacensis eiusdem argumenti. An edition of The Journey of Haithon, King of Little Armenia, To Mongolia and Back by Armenian historian Kirakos Gandzaketsi. The work is an account of the travels of Hethum I of Armenia to the East.

Matthäus Dresser (1536–1607), a German philologist and historian. A scholar of Greek and Latin, his principal work was on Aristotle. His commentaries reflect a desire to affirm great deeds done by the Germans.

- Commentary on Reiner Reineck's Chronicon Hierosolymitanum (1584).
- Isagoges historicae (1586–1606). An edition of works of Aristotle.
- Matthaei Dresseri Orationum Libri III (1606).

Torquato Tasso (1544–1595), an Italian poet. Widely read before the twentieth century, Tasso was at the forefront of Crusader writing for two centuries. Also known as Le Tasse.

- La Gerusalemme liberata (Jerusalem Delivered), 2 volumes (1581). A reinvention of the First Crusade and the struggle between Christianity and Islam, using both Benedetto Accolti's 1464 work De Bello a Christianis contra Barbaros..., and available original sources. Tasso lionized Godfrey of Bouillon as the ideal military leader.
- Dialoghi (Dialogues), 3 volumes (1578–1594). A work that touches on major themes of the time, including the defeat of the Turks at the battle of Lepanto in 1571 by the navies of the Holy League.

Uberto Foglietta (1518–1581), an Italian historian.

- Uberti Folietae de Sacro foedere in Selimum libri quattuor. Ejusdem variae expeditiones in Africam, cum obsidione Melitae, 4 volumes (1587).
- The Sieges of Nicosia and Famagusta in Cyprus (1587). Translation of portions of Foglietta's De Sacro foedere in Selimum on the Ottoman-Venetian war of 1570–1573 by British colonial officer Claude Delaval Cobham.

Heinrich Cornelius Agrippa von Nettesheim (1486–1535), a German polymath, theologian, and occult writer.

- Raymundi Lulli Opera (1598). The works of Ramon Lull edited by H. von Nettesheim.

Di Antonio Mossi. Di Antonio Mossi (fl. 16th century), an Italian historian.

- Breve descrizione dello acquisto di Terra Santa (1601). An early work on the history of the Crusades.

Michele Zappulo. Michele Zappulo (1548–16..), an Italian historian.

- Historia di Quattro principali città del mondo, Gerusalemme, Roma, Napoli e Venzia (1603). History of the four main cities of the world: Jerusalem, Rome, Naples, and Venice. An early example of Crusades history.

Edward Fairfax (c. 1580—27 January 1635), an English translator.

- Godfrey of Bulloigne, or, The recoverie of Jerusalem (1600). A version of Torquato Tasso's La Gerusalemme liberata done into English herotical verse, dedicated to Elizabeth I of England.

== Seventeenth century ==
Historians of the 17th century continued with concerns about the rise of the Turkish threat, the discovery and publication of original sources, and the beginning of serious histories of the Crusades.

- The Turkish wars and proposals for a new Crusade are seen through the works of Richard Knolles, Francis Bacon and Gottfried Leibniz.
- Original sources, first codified in the Gesta Dei per Francos (1611) by Jacques Bongars, and analysis by Jean Besly, and the bibliographic encyclopedia Kaşf az-Zunūn (1652) by Kâtip Çelebi.
- Additional original documents were presented in De Byzantinæ historiæ scriptoribus (1648–1729), works of Byzantine historians, begun by Philippe Labbe; Luc d'Achery's Spicilegium (1655–1677), a collection of medieval documents, and Bibliothèque orientale (1697), a collection of Arabic, Turkish and Persian manuscripts, by Barthélemy d'Herbelot.
- The establishment of the Congregation of Saint Maur in 1616, dominating French historical research.
- Crusader histories, the most important of which were Thomas Fuller's The Historie of the Holy Warre (1639) and Louis Maimbourg's Histoire des Croisades pour la délivrance de la Terre Sainte (1675), translated into English by John Nalson. Also of note are Charles du Fresne du Cange's Histoire de l'empire de Constantinople sous les empereurs françois (1657), an account of the Fourth Crusade and subsequent Greek settlements, and A. de Clermont's L'Histoire des Croisadare (1638).
- Histories of the Ottoman Empire by Richard Knolles, George Sandys and Paul Rycant.
- Beginning of the disciplines of palaeography and diplomatics under Jean Mabillon, a scholar of the Congregation of Saint Maur.

Richard Knolles (c. 1545–1610), an English historian, known for his seminal account of the Ottoman Empire.

- Generall Historie of the Turkes, 3 parts in 2 volumes (1603). A later edition entitled The Turkish History: comprehending the origin of that nation, and the growth of the Othoman empire, with the lives and conquests of their several kings and emperors (1701) includes continuations through 1631 by ambassador Thomas Roe and through 1699 by diplomat and historian Paul Rycaut.

Jacques Bongars (1554–1612), a French scholar and diplomat who prepared the first comprehensive collection of original Crusades sources.

- Gesta Dei per Francos (God's Work through the Franks), 2 volumes (1611). An early collection of original sources for the Crusades, with commentary. The compendium, dedicated to Louis XIII of France, includes most of the main narrative sources for the First Crusade and Fifth Crusade, as well as Historia Rerum in Partibus Transmarinis Gestarum of William of Tyre, the Secretorum Fidelium Crucis of Marino Sanudo and De recuperatione Terre Sancte of Pierre Dubois.
- Lettres de Monsieur de Bongars (1681). Letters of Bongars from his time as representative to Henry IV of France.
- Jacobus Bongarsius (1874). A biography of J. Bongars by German philosopher Hermann Hagen.
- Catalogus codicum bernensium (Bibliotheca Bongarsiana) (1875). Edited by H. Hagen.
- Biographie des Jacques Bongars (1905). A translation of the doctoral thesis of German Biblical scholar Raphael Breuer (1881–1932). (cf. German Wikipedia, Raphael Breuer)

Congregation of Saint Maur. The Congregation of Saint Maur (1616–1818), a school of prominent Benedictines, known as the Maurists, which produced a large number of historical documents, many of particular interest to the Crusades including the Recueil des historiens des croisade (RHC) and Histoire littéraire de la France. (cf. French Wikipedia, Congrégation de Saint-Maur)

- Bibliothèque des écrivains de la Congrégation de Saint-Maur (covering works from 1645–1787). Bibliography of Maurist works, published in 1882, compiled by German librarian Karl von Lama (1841–1920), reducing and completing the earlier Histoire littéraire de la congregation de Saint-Maur (1770) of René-Prosper Tassin (1697–1777).

Francis Bacon (1561–1626), an English philosopher and statesman.

- The Works of Francis Bacon, 15 volumes, edited by James Spedding, Robert L. Ellis and Douglas D. Heath (1857–1874). Full title: The Works of Francis Bacon, Baron of Verulam, Viscount St Albans and Lord High Chancellor of England.
- Advertisement Touching on a Holy Warre (1622), in The Works of Francis Bacon, Volume 7, pp. 367–370.

George Sandys (1578–1644), an English traveller, colonist, poet, and translator. Sandys' writings influenced contemporary literature and other disciplines including art, archaeology and geography. Sandys is considered to be the first English Egyptologist.

- A Relation of a Journey begun an. Dom. 1610, 4 volumes (1615). The account of an extended tour of Europe and the Middle East in 1610–1612, giving detailed accounts of Constantinople, Cairo, Jerusalem, Emmaus, Bethlehem and Nazareth.
- A General History of the Ottoman Empire (1740). Including Turkey, Egypt, the Holy Land, Jerusalem, Palestine and Arabia. Conjecture as to the fate of the Ten Lost Tribes of Israel.
- Sandys Travels: containing an history of the original and present state of the Turkish empire (1673). The Mahometan religion and ceremonies. A description of Constantinople ... also, of Greece ... Of Ægypt ... A description of the Holy-Land ... Lastly, Italy described, and the islands adjoining. Illustrated with fifty graven maps and figures.

Paolo Sarpi (1552–1623), a Venetian historian.

- Istoria del Concilio Tridentino (1619). A history of the Council of Trent (1545–1563) whose topics included the Turkish threat to Western Europe.
- True and Faithful Relation ... concerning the Death of Sultan Osman ..., (1622). A translation of a work concerning the death of Ottoman sultan Osman II, by English diplomat Thomas Roe..

Sir Thomas Roe (c. 1581–1644), an English diplomat, representing England in the Mughal Empire, the Ottoman Empire, and the Holy Roman Empire.

- Embassy of Sir Thomas Roe to the Court of the Great Mogul, 1615–1619, as narrated in his journal and correspondence (after 1619). Edited with an introduction by British historiographer William Foster (1863–1951) for the Hakluyt Society.
- True and Faithful Relation ... concerning the Death of Sultan Osman ... (1622). A translation of a work concerning the death of Ottoman sultan Osman II by Venetian historian Paolo Sarpi.
- Continuation of Generall Historie of the Turkes (1603) by English historian Richard Knolles.

Théodore Godefroy (1580–1649), a Swiss historian.

- Histoire de Mre Jean de Boucicaut, maréchal de France (1620). A history of Jean II Le Maingre (Boucicaut), leader of the Crusade of Marshal Boucicaut to Constantinople in 1399.

Thomas Dempster (1579–1625), a Scottish scholar and historian.

- De Bello a Christianis contra Barbaros gesto pro Christi Sepulchro et Judaea recuperandis libri IV (1623). Translation of work by Benedetto Accolti (1415–1464).
- Historia ecclesiastica gentis Scotorum, 2 volumes (1627). A history of the Scots. In this book he tries to prove that Bernard the Pilgrim, Alcuin, Boniface and Joannes Scotus Erigena were all Scots, and that Boadicea was a Scottish author.

A. de Clermont. (fl. 17th century), a presumed French historian. The only mention of de Clermont is by Crusader historian Hans E. Mayer in his Bibliographie zur Geschichte der Kreuzzüge.

- L'Histoire des Croisades (1638). A general history of the Crusades that explicitly used the designator croisades in its title, an honor usually attributed to the 1675 work of Louis Maimbourg. Nothing else is known about this work.

Jean Besly. (1572–1644), a French historian who challenged the version of the anonymous Gesta Francorum presented in Gesta Dei per Francos.

- Historia de Hierosolymitano itinere by Peter Tudebode (1641). Translation by J. Besley.
- Joannis Besly Pictonis Præfatio (before 1644). The preface to Tudebode's Historia de Hierosolymitano itinere, reproduced in RHC Historiens occidentaux, Volume III.1 (cf. Patrologia Latina (MPL), Volume 155 [Godefridum, Appendix II])
- Histoire des comtes de Poitou et ducs de Guyenne contenant ce qui s'est passé de plus mémorable en France depuis l'an 811 jusques au roy Louis le Jeune, vérifiée par tiltres, et par anciens historiens, ensemble divers traictez historiques (1647).
- Testament on Geoffrey II of Lusignan (1198–1247) (date unknown). Geoffrey was the son of Hugh VIII of Lusignan, and the testament is in Les anciens sires de Lusignan (The Old Sires of Lusignan) by French historian and numismatist Charles Farcinet (1824–1903). (cf. French Wikipedia, Geoffrey II de Lusignan)
- Recueil de documents historiques, pour la plupart relatifs au Poitou et aux provinces voisines (XIIe-XVIIe siècle) (date unknown). Collection of historical documents, mostly relating to Poitou and neighboring provinces, collected and copied by Besly. Published by the Bibliothèque nationale de France.

André Duchesne (1584–1640), a French geographer and historian, and his son François Duchesne (1616–1693), also a historian.

- Historiae Francorum Scriptores Coaetanei, 5 volumes (1636–1649). A collection of Crusader sources that builds on Bongars' Gesta Dei per Francos and includes: Vita Ludovici regis and Historia gloriosi regis Ludovici by Suger of St. Denis; De profectione Ludovici VII in Orientem by Odo of Deuil; and Orderic Vitalis' Historia Ecclesiastica.
- Histoire des papes et sovverains chefs de l'eglise, 2 volumes (1653). A history of the popes from Saint Peter to Innocent X, derived from histories, memoirs and chronicles.

Thomas Fuller (1608–1661), an English churchman and historian. Fuller's work was anti-Jewish and relied heavily on that of William of Tyre. It was the first to incorporate accounts of the military orders, the Albigensian Crusade and the Northern Crusades into his narrative.

- The Historie of the Holy Warre (1639). A history of the Crusades from the fall of Jerusalem under Titus in 70 AD through 1290. Includes critical commentary, a complete chronology, and bibliography. With an introduction by English classical scholar James Duport (1606–1679).
- The History of the Holy War. An 1840 edition of The Historie of the Holy Warre.
- A Pisgah-Sight of Palestine and the confines thereof; with the history of the Old and New Testaments acted thereon (1650). A descriptive geography of the Holy Land, with "facsimiles of all the quaint maps and illustrations" of the original edition.
- The History of the Worthies of England, 3 volumes (1662). An attempt at a dictionary of national biography, from original sources and providing valuable antiquarian information.

Edward Pococke (1604–1691), an English orientalist and Biblical scholar.

- Specimen historiae arabum (1649). An account of the origin and manners of the Arabs, adapted from the work of Syriac historian Bar Hebraeus (1226–1286) and other sources.
- Contextia Gemmarum sive Eutychii Patriarchae Alexandrini Annales, 2 volumes (1658–1659). A biography of Eutychius of Alexandria (877–940), Melkite patriarch of Alexandria. The Latin translation was reprinted in Patrologia Graeco-Latina (MPG), Volume 111. With English orientalist John Selden.
- Greg. Abulfaragii historia compendiosa dynastiarum (1663). A complete edition of the Arabic history of Bar Hebraeus.
- Account of Egypt (1680s). By Arab historian Abd al-Latif al-Baghdadi (1162–1231). Arabic document published by E. Pococke. His son Edward Pococke the Younger (1648–1727) translated a fragment of the work into Latin (publication date unknown). Arabic scholar Thomas Hunt began the task of completing the translation but did not finish. The Latin translation was then completed by orientalist Joseph White.

John Selden (1584–1654), an English orientalist and polymath.

- Contextia Gemmarum sive Eutychii Patriarchae Alexandrini Annales, 2 volumes (1658–1659). A biography of Eutychius of Alexandria, Melkite patriarch of Alexandria. The Latin translation was reprinted in Patrologia Graeco-Latina (MPG), Volume 111. With Edward Pococke (1604–1691).
- De dis Syris syntagmata II (1680). A study of Semitic mythology.

Philippe Labbe (1607–1667), a French Jesuit who wrote on historical, geographical and philological topics, including those of the Byzantine empire.

- De Byzantinæ Historiæ Scriptoribus, 24 volumes (1648–1729). An account of primary sources of Byzantine history from 330–1453. Later revised and expanded by Danish historian Barthold Niebuhr into the Corpus Scriptorum Historæ Byzantinæ (CSHB).

Elhac Mustafa Kâtip Çelebi (1609–1657), an Ottoman-Turkish polymath and author. Also known by the name of Ḥājjī Khalīfa.

- Kaşf az-Zunūn, 7 volumes (1652). A bibliographic encyclopedia of Arabic works whose title translates to The Removal of Doubt from the Names of Books and the Arts. Published in the original Arabic with parallel Latin translation by German orientalist Gustav Flügel and in a French translation by Barthélemy d'Herbelot.

Luc d'Achery (1609–1685), a French Benedictine of the Congregation of Saint Maur specializing in the study and publication of medieval manuscripts.

- Spicilegium, sive Collectio veterum aliquot scriptorum qui in Galliae bibliothecis, maxime Benedictinorum, latuerunt, 13 volumes (1655–1677). A collection of ancient and medieval documents of interest to the Benedictines. Continued by French Benedictine historians Edmond Martène (1654–1739) and Ursin Durand (1682–1771) in their Veterum Scriptorum.
- Acta sanctorum ordinis S. Benedicti, 9 volumes (1701). A collection of the lives of the Benedictine saints, completed by Jean Mabillon.

Charles du Fresne, sieur du Cange (1610–1688), a French philologist and historian of the Middle Ages and Byzantium.

- Histoire de l'empire de Constantinople sous les empereurs françois (1657). The first serious study of the Fourth Crusade and the Frankish settlements in Greece.
- Glossarium ad scriptores mediae et infimae Latinitatis, 6 volumes (1678). Glossary of writers in medieval and late Latin. Crucesignati (Tome 2, pp. 1175–1176) discusses Crusader privileges. A new edition and supplement were published by Dom Pierre Carpentier and Maurus Dantine in the 18th century.
- Historia Byzantina, 2 volumes (1680). A history of the Byzantine empire from 395–1453. With a description of the city of Constantinople.
- Les familles d'Outremer (unpublished). Genealogy of the royal families of the Kingdom of Jerusalem through 1244. By the decree of the Minister of Public Instruction, the publication and completion of Du Cange's unfinished work was entrusted to Nicolas Rudolphe Taranne. After the latter's death it was continued by French orientalist Emmanuel Guillaume-Rey, published in 1869.
- Glossarium ad scriptores mediae et infimae Graecitatis, 2 volumes (1688). A glossary of Greek writers.
- Paschalion seu Chronicon Paschale (1689). A translation of the 7th century work Chronicon Paschale.
- Annes tes Komnenes porpherogennetou kaisarisses Alexias (1729). Translation of Anna Komnene's Alexiad.

Gottfried Wilhelm (von) Leibniz (1646–1716), a prominent German mathematician and philosopher.

- Project de conquête l'Egypte présenté à Louis XIV (1671). In Oeuvres, edited by French author Louis-Alexandre Foucher de Careil. A proposal prepared for Louis XIV of France by Leibniz for a new Crusade to conquer the Ottoman empire. Includes a history of the Crusades, particularly the Egyptian strategies of the thirteenth and fourteenth centuries. Discussed in detail in Tyerman's The Debate on the Crusades.
- La fascination de l'Egypte (1998). Commentary on and edition of Project de conquête l'Egypte présenté à Louis XIV by Egyptian historian Ahmed Youssef.

Étienne Baluze (1630–1718), a French scholar and historiographer. Also known as Stephanus Baluzius.

- Capitularia Regum Francorum, 2 volumes (1677). A collection of capitularies of the kings of France, including the Merovingian kings, Pippin, Charlemagne and Louis the Pious. For the period after 840, Baluze included as supplements the (unreliable) collections of Saint Ansegisus (9th century) and the forged ones attributed to Benedictus Levita. The work then includes the capitularies of Charles the Bald, and of other Carolingian kings.
- Capitularia Regum Francorum, second edition of Baluze, 2 volumes (1780). Update of Baluze's work, by French politician Pierre Chiniac de La Bastide.
- Epistolae Innocentii Papae III (1682). The letters of pope Innocent III.
- Vitae Paparum Avenionensium (1693). A history of popes who settled in France between 1305–1394. Includes the report of Grand Master of the Knights Templar, Jacques de Molay, to pope Clement V on the merging of the military orders.

Louis Maimbourg (1610–1686), a French Jesuit and historian.

- Histoire de l'Arianisme, 2 volumes (1673). The influence of Arianism on civil affairs and the causes of the dissolution of the Roman empire. Introductory discourse by French mathematician Bernard Lamy (1640–1715). Translated by British theologian William Webster (1689–1758) as A Complete History of Arianism from 306 to 1666, with Commentary.
- Histoire de l'hérésie des Iconoclastes et de la translation de l'empire aux françois (1674). A history of the heresy of the Iconoclasts and the translation of the empire to the French.
- Histoire des Croisades pour la délivrance de la Terre Sainte (1675). A populist and royalist history of the Crusades from 1195–1220. Translated into English in 1684 by historian John Nalson.
- Histoire du grand schisme d'Occident (1679). An account of the Great Schism of 1054.

Bernard Lamy (1640–1715), a French mathematician and theologian.

- Introductory discourse to Louis Maimbourg's Histoire de l'Arianisme (1673).
- Demonstration ou Preuves evidentes de la verite et de la saintete de la morale chrétienne (1709). A treatise on Christian morals.
- De tabernaculo foederis, de sancta civitate Jerusalem, et de templo ejus, libri septem (1720, posthumous). A Latin treatise on the Ark of the Covenant. Edited by French historian Pierre Nicolas Desmolets (1678–1760) who added Vita auctoris (a biography of the author) and De templo Salomonis historico (history of Solomon's Temple). Engraved plates by Pierre François Giffart (1638–1723) and Ferdinand Delamonce (1678–1753).

Jean Mabillon (1632–1707), a French Benedictine monk and scholar of the Congregation of Saint Maur. Regarded as one of the greatest historical scholar of the 17th century and the founder of the disciplines of palaeography and diplomatics.

- De re diplomatica (1681). An analysis of medieval documents and manuscripts back to the early 7th century. (cf. French Wikipedia, De re diplomatica)
- Acta sanctorum ordinis S. Benedicti, 9 volumes (1701). A collection of the lives of the Benedictine saints, the completion of a work begun by Luc d'Achery.

Pierre Bayle (1647–1706), a French philosopher, author, and lexicographer.

- Miscellaneous Reflections Occasion'd by the Comet which appear'd in December 1680, 3 volumes (1682). Subtitled: Chiefly tending to explode popular superstitions. An account of the Great Comet of 1680, the first to be discovered by telescope. English translation of 1708 includes a biography of the author.
- Dictionnaire historique et critique, 2 volumes (1697). A French biographical dictionary also known as the Historical and Critical Dictionary, regarded as one of the earliest encyclopedias. Based on the previous La Grand Dictionnaire historique by theologian Louis Moréri (1643–1680). Numerous editions with improvements from 1792 through 1830. The nouvelle édition by Adrien-Jean-Quentin Beuchot was published in 16 volumes in 1820.

John Nalson (1638–1686), an English clergyman, historian and pamphleteer.

- The History of the Crusade, or the Expeditions of the Christian Princes, for the Conquest of the Holy Land (1684). A translation from the French of Maimbourg's Histoire des Croisades...(1675).

Sir Paul Rycaut (1629–1700), a British diplomat and historian, known as an authority on the Ottoman Empire.

- The History of the present state of the Ottoman Empire (1686). Containing the maxims of the Turkish polity, the most material points of the Mahometan religion, their sects and heresies, their convents and religious votaries. Their military discipline, with an exact computation of their forces both by sea and land.
- The Turkish History: Comprehending the origin of that nation, and the growth of the Othoman empire, with the lives and conquests of their several kings and emperors, 2 volumes (1701). A continuation of Generall Historie of the Turkes (1603) by English historian Richard Knolles, bringing the history down to 1699. Includes continuations by ambassador Sir Thomas Roe.

Louis-Sébastien Le Nain de Tillemont (1637–1698), a French ecclesiastical historian.

- Vie de Saint Louis: Roi de France, 6 volumes (1688). An extensive biography of Lous IX of France. The Société de l'histoire de France published an edition of the work edited by French historian Julien de Gaulle (1801–1883) beginning in 1847.

Barthélemy d'Herbelot de Molainville (1625–1695), a French orientalist.

- Bibliothèque Orientale, ou dictionnaire universel contenant tout ce qui regarde la connoissance des peuples de l'Orient, 3 volumes (1697). Edited by d'Herbelot, completed by French orientalist and archaeologist Antoine Galland. Derived from the bibliographic encyclopedia Kaşf az-Zunūn by Kâtip Çelebi, it contains a large number of Arabic, Turkish and Persian compilations and manuscripts.

Robert Saulger. (1637–1709), an author and Jesuit missionary to Greece. (cf. French Wikipedia, Robert Saulger)

- Histoire nouvelle des Ducs et autres Souverains de l'Archipel (1698). A history of the Frankish settlements in the Cyclades, particularly the Duchy of the Archipelago (Duchy of Naxos, 1207–1579), founded by Marco I Sanudo.

== Eighteenth century ==
The principal Crusader historians of the 18th century include the following.

Antoine Galland (1646–1715), a French orientalist and archaeologist.

- Les mille et une nuits, 12 volumes (1704–1717). The first European translation of One Thousand and One Nights, into French.
- Bibliothèque Orientale, ou dictionnaire universel contenant tout ce qui regarde la connoissance des peuples de l'Orient, 3 volumes (1697). Edited by Barthélemy d'Herbelot (1625–1695) and completed by Antoine Galland (1646–1715). Derived from the bibliographic encyclopedia Kaşf az-Zunūn by Kâtip Çelebi, it contains a large number of Arabic, Turkish and Persian compilations and manuscripts.

Eusèbe Renaudot (1646–1720), a French theologian and orientalist.

- Life of Saladin (unpublished).
- Gennadii Patriarchae Constantinopolitani Homiliae de Eucharistia (1709)
- Historia Patriarcharum Alexandrinorum (1713), a translation of Ta'rikh Batarikat al-Kanisah al-Misriyah by Severus ibn al-Muqaffa (died 987). In Patrologia Orientalis (PO), Volume 1.II.
- Liturgiarurn Orientalium Collection, 2 volumes (1715–1716). A collection of oriental liturgies, designed to supply proofs of the perpetuity of the faith of the Church on the subject of the sacraments. The English translation of 1822 is titled: A Collection of the principal liturgies, which are used by the Greeks and other schismatics of the Oriental churches. Showing their uniformity with the Roman liturgy, in all essentials, relating to the sacrifice of the Mass. Included is am analysis reportedly proving the antiquity and authority of the liturgies and an answer to the objections against the doctrine of transubstantiation.
- Ancient accounts of India and China (1733). An imperfect translation of a 9th century account by Arabic historian Abu Zayd Ḥasan ibn Yazīd Sīrāfī and Persian merchant Sulaymān al-Tājir (fl. 850). Edition of the very curious records of early Arab intercourse with China. Updated edition published in 1845 by Joseph Reinaud.

Georg Christoph Müller. (1673–1721), a German historian. His work assigned five numbers to the Crusades. (cf. German Wikipedia, Georg Christoph Müller)

- De Expedition Cruciatis Vulgo Von Kreutz Fahrten (1709). A history of the Crusades in the time frames 1096–1099 (First Crusade), 1147–1149 (Second Crusade), 1189–1192 (Third Crusade), 1217–1229 (Fifth Crusade), and 1248–1254 (Seventh Crusade), considering just those large expeditions that reached the eastern Mediterranean. Source document for Hagenmeyer's edition of Anonymi gesta Francorum et aliorum Hierosolymitanorum (1890).

Aaron Hill (1685–1750), an English dramatist and miscellany writer.

- A Full and Just Account of the Present State of the Ottoman Empire in all its Branches: With the government, and policy, religion, customs, and way of living of the Turks, in general (1709).

Edmond Martène (1654–1739) was a French Benedictine historian and liturgist of the Congregation of Saint Maur.

- Thesaurus Novus Anedotorum, 5 volumes (1717). Edited with French Benedictine historian Ursin Durand. Begun in 1708 with a search of the archives of France and Belgium for the Gallia Christiana, the documentary catalogue of the Catholic dioceses and abbeys of France from the earliest times. Documents gathered from eight hundred abbeys and one hundred cathedrals.
- Veterum Scriptorum et Monumentorum Amplissima Collectio, 9 volumes (1727–1733). Edited with U. Durand. A continuation of Luc d'Achery's Spicilegium on ancient and medieval documents of interest to the Benedictines.

Ursin Durand (1682–1771), a Benedictine historian of the Congregation of Saint Maur.

- Thesaurus Novus Anedotorum, 5 volumes (1717). Edited with French Benedictine historian Edmond Martène. Begun in 1708 with a search of the archives of France and Belgium for the Gallia Christiana, the documentary catalogue of the Catholic dioceses and abbeys of France from the earliest times. Documents gathered from eight hundred abbeys and one hundred cathedrals.
- Veterum Scriptorum et Monumentorum Amplissima Collectio, 9 volumes (1727–1733). Edited with E. Martène. A continuation of Luc d'Achery's Spicilegium on ancient and medieval documents of interest to the Benedictines.
- "L'Art de vérifier les dates, 3 volumes (1750). A French work on diplomatics. The art of verifying the dates of historical facts, charters, chronicles, and other ancient monuments, since the birth of Our Lord: by means of a chronological table ...: with these perpetual calendars, the glossary of dates, the catalog of saints, and the calendar of the Jews. With Maurus Dantine and Charles Clémencet.

Pierre Nicolas Desmolet (1678–1760), a French librarian and oratorian historiographer.

- De tabernaculo foederis, de sancta civitate Jerusalem, et de templo ejus, libri septem (1720). A Latin treatise on the Ark of the Covenant by Bernard Lamy, edited by P. Desmolets, who added Vita auctoris (a biography of B. Lamy) and De templo Salomonis historico (history of Solomon's Temple). Engraved plates by Pierre François Giffart (1638–1723) and Ferdinand Delamonce (1678–1753).
- Memoires de litterature et d'histoire, 11 volumes in 12 (1749). Continuation of a 1715 work by Albert-Henri de Sallengre (1694–1723). (cf. French Wikipedia, Albert-Henri de Sallengre)
- Continuation des Memoires de litterature et d'histoire (1749).
- L’Histoire de l'Empire Othoman, où se voyent les causes de son agrandissement et de sa décadence, 4 volumes (1743). A history of the Ottoman Empire used as a reference for Gibbon's History of the Decline and Fall of the Roman Empire. Later scholarship has questioned the reliability of some sources. Translation of the work by Moldavian historian Dimitrie Cantemir.

Pierre Giffart (1638–1723), a French engraver and publisher.

- Illustrations for De tabernaculo foederis, de sancta civitate Jerusalem, et de templo ejus, libri septem (1720). A Latin treatise on the Ark of the Covenant by Bernard Lamy. Edited by French historian Pierre Nicolas Desmolets who added Vita auctoris (a biography of the author) and De templo Salomonis historico (history of Solomon's Temple). Engraved plates by P. Giffart and Ferdinand Delamonce (1678–1753).
- Illustrations for Géographie Universelle (1739), by Claude Buffier (1661–1737). Engraved plates by P. Giffart.

Antoine Rivet de La Grange (1683–1749), a French benedictine monk and archivist.

- Histoire littéraire de la France, 46 volumes (1733–1892). A large collection of French literature begun by La Grange, known as Dom Rivet, and the Maurists. Of most interest to the Crusades is Tome VIII which includes a biography of Godfrey of Bouillon and works by Raymond of Aguilers and Peter Tudebode.

Maurus Dantine (1688–1746), a Belgian Benedictine of the Congregation of Saint Maur and a founding chronologist.

- Glossarium ad scriptores mediae et infimae Latinitatis, 6 volumes (1733, 1736). A new edition of Charles du Fresne du Cange's work, with Pierre Carpentier. Glossary of writers in medieval and late Latin. See article titled Crucesignati (Tome 2, pp. 1175–1176) for a discussion on Crusader privileges.
- L'Art de vérifier les dates, 3 volumes (1750). A French work on diplomatics. The art of verifying the dates of historical facts, charters, chronicles, and other ancient monuments, since the birth of Our Lord: by means of a chronological table ...: with these perpetual calendars, the glossary of dates, the catalog of saints, and the calendar of the Jews. With Ursin Durand and Charles Clémencet.

Pierre Carpentier. Dom Pierre Carpentier (1697–1767), a Benedictine historian. (cf. French Wikipedia, Pierre Carpentier)

- Glossarium ad scriptores mediae et infimae Latinitatis, 6 volumes (1733, 1736). A new edition of Charles du Fresne du Cange's work, with Maurus Dantine (1688–1746). Glossary of writers in medieval and late Latin. See article titled Crucesignati (Tome 2, pp. 1175–1176) for a discussion on Crusader privileges.
- Supplement to Glossarium ad scriptores..., 4 volumes (1766).

Dimitrie Cantemir (1673–1723), a Moldavian statesman and historian. A direct descendant of Tamerlane, he was twice ruler of Moldavia.

- Historia incrementorum atque decrementorum Aulae Othomanicae (before 1734). A history of the rise and fall of the Ottoman empire.
- The History of the Growth and Decay of the Othman empire (1734–1735). English translation of Historia incrementorum atque decrementorum Aulae Othomanicae. Adorn'd with the heads of the Turkish emperors, ingraven from copies taken from originals in the grand seignor's palace, by the late sultan's painter.
- L’Histoire de l'Empire Othoman, où se voyent les causes de son agrandissement et de sa décadence, 4 volumes (1743). A history of the Ottoman Empire used as a reference for Gibbon's History of the Decline and Fall of the Roman Empire. Later scholarship has questioned the reliability of some sources. Translation of the work by French historiographer Pierre Desmolets.

Martin Bouquet (1685–1754), a French Benedictine monk and historian of the Congregation of Saint Maur.

- Recueil des historiens des Gaules et de la France (RHF), 22 volumes (new edition, 24 volumes) (1738–1904). New edition undertaken by French historian Léopold V. Delisle (1826–1910). A collection of histories of France by Gaulian and French authors, including ones of relevance to the Crusades. Tome 12 includes works by Robert the Monk and William of Tyre. Tome 13 includes works by William of Malmesbury, Henry of Huntingdon, Roger of Howden and Ralph de Diceto. (cf. French Wikipedia, Recueil des historiens des Gaules et de la France)
- Planned expansion of the RHF. The histories were planned to be expanded to include oriental sources of the Crusades. The project was led by Dom Berthereau (1732–1792) and was interrupted by the French political turmoil.

Burkhard Gotthelf Struve (1671–1738), a German librarian and historian.

- Bibliotheca historica selecta, 2 volumes (1740). With Christian Gottlieb Buder (1693–1763). Expanded into Bibliotheca historica by Johann Georg Meusel.

René-Aubert Vertot (1655–1735), a French clergyman and historian of the Knights Hospitaller.

- Histoire des Chevaliers Hospitaliers de Saint-Jean de Jérusalem, 5 volumes (published 1742). A history of the Knights Hospitaller.
- The History of the Knights Hospitallers of St. John of Jerusalem, 3 volumes (1818). Styled afterwards, the Knights of Rhodes and at present, the Knights of Malta . English translation of Histoire des Chevaliers Hospitaliers de Saint-Jean de Jérusalem.
- Histoire de l'Ordre des Chevaliers de Malte (1819).
- The History of the Knights Hospitallers of St. John of Jerusalem, 5 volumes (1858). Later edition of Histoire des Chevaliers Hospitaliers de Saint-Jean de Jérusalem.

Thomas Hunt (1696–1774), an English Arabic scholar.

- A Dissertation on Proverbs VII. 22, 23 (1743). Critical dissertations on the Proverbs of Solomon.
- Account of Egypt (1746, unpublished). By Arab historian Abd al-Latif al-Baghdadi (1162–1231). Arabic document first discovered and published by Edward Pococke (1604–1691). His son, Edward Pococke the Younger, then translated a fragment of the work into Latin. T. Hunt began the task of completing the translation but did not finish. The work was then translated into French by Silvestre de Sacy (1758–1838).

Joseph de Guignes (1721–1800), a French orientalist.

- Mémoire historique sur l'origine des Huns et des Turcs (1748). A history of the origins of the Huns and the Turks.
- Histoire generale des Huns, des Mongoles, des Turcs et des autres Tartares occidentaux, 3 volumes (1756–1758). General history of the Huns, Mongols, Turks and other Western Tartars.
- Essai historique sur la typographie orientale et grecque de l'Imprimerie Royale (1787). An historical essay on the origin of the oriental characters in the Royal printing-house. Includes the works which have been printed at Paris in Arabic, Syriac and Armenian. Also the Greek characters of Francis I of France, commonly called the King's Greek, cut by French publisher and punch-cutter Claude Garamont (1510–1561).

Voltaire (1694–1778), a French philosopher and historian. Voltaire's negative view on the Crusades was tempered with his admiration for the Crusaders. His work on the Crusades did not adhere to any real chronology, providing little detail and no numbering.

- Histoire des Croisades (1750–1751). A history of the Crusades from the rise of the Seljuks until 1195, with critique.
- Croisades (1751). The entry on the Crusades in Volume 2 of Denis Diderot's Encyclopédie is based on Voltaire's work, summarizing that the Crusades were "...soit pour le recouvrement des lieux saints, soit pour l'extirpation de l'heresie et du paganisme" (either for the recovery of Holy Places, or for the eradication of heresy and paganism).
- Essai sur les mœurs et l'esprit des nations, 10 volumes (1756). An essay on universal history, the manners, and spirit of nations, from Charlemagne to the present day. The work incorporated Voltaire's earlier work Histoire des Croisades. In particular, Tome Second covers the period 1050–1416, and includes the following portions relevant to the Crusades: Chapitre XLII. De Frederic II (Frederick II). Chapitre XLIII. De l'Orient au tems des Croisade (The Orient before the Crusades). Chapitre XLIV. De la Premier Croisade Jusq'ua la Prise de Jerusalem (From the First Crusade until the Capture of Jerusalem). Chapitre XLVI. De S. Louis, et de la Derniere Croisade (Saint Louis and the Last Crusade). Chapitre XLVII. Suite de la Prise de Constantinople par les Croisés (Following the Capture of Constantinople by the Crusaders). Chapitre XLVIII. De l'Orient et de Genzis-Can (The Orient and Genghis Khan). Chapitre L. De la Croisade contre Albigeois (The Crusade against the Albigensians). Chapitre LIV. Du Supplice des Templiers, et de l'extinction de cet Ordre (Of the Torment of the Templars, and the extinction of this Order).

Charles Clémencet (1703–1778), a French Benedictine historian of the Congregation of Saint Maur.

- L'Art de vérifier les dates, 3 volumes (1750). A French work on diplomatics. The art of verifying the dates of historical facts, charters, chronicles, and other ancient monuments, since the birth of Our Lord: by means of a chronological table ... with these perpetual calendars, the glossary of dates, the catalog of saints, and the calendar of the Jews. With Maurus Dantine and Ursin Durand.
- Editor-in-chief, Histoire littéraire de la France, Volumes 10–12 (1756–1763). Works there cover the 11th and 12th centuries through 1167, and include several of the original sources of the Crusades.

Camille Falconet. (1671–1762), a French physician and historian. (cf. French Wikipedia, Camille Falconet)

- Dissertation sur les Assassins, Peuple d'Asie (1751). A compendium of accounts concerning the Assassins of Syria, identifying works by Benjamin of Tudela, William of Tyre, Hayton of Corycus, Marco Polo, John Phocas, Jacques de Vitry, Arnold of Lübeck, Matthew Paris and Abu'l-Feda that discussed the sect.
- Dissertation on the Assassins of Syria, in Volume 2 of Memoirs of John Lord de Joinville, Grand Seneschal of Champagne (1807), edited by English translator Thomas Johnes.

David Hume (1711–1776), Scottish philosopher and historian. Hume regarded the Crusades as the "nadir of Western civilization" and "the most signal and most durable monument of human folly that has yet appeared in any age or nation." He also famously stated that "the Crusades engrossed the attention of Europe and have ever since engaged the curiosity of mankind." This view was continued by E. Gibbon.

- The History of England, 6 volumes (1754–1761). The history of England, Scotland, Ireland and Wales that covers: The invasion of Julius Caesar to the accession of Henry VII, through 1485 (Volumes 1 and 2); England under the House of Tudor (Volumes 3 and 4); Great Britain during the reigns of James I and Charles I (Volume 5); and, the Commonwealth and the reigns of Charles II and James I (Volume 6). Richard I of England and the Third Crusade are presented in Volume 1. The later Crusades, to the extent that the English participated, are presented in Volume 2.

Jean-Pierre de Bougainville (1722–1763), a French writer.

- Défense de la chronologie fondée sur les monumens de l'histoire ancienne (1758).
- Mémoires sur l'ancienne chevalerie: considérée comme un établissement politique & militaire, 3 volumes (1781). Memoirs of ancient chivalry, by Jean-Baptiste de La Curne de Sainte-Palaye. With a preface by J.-P. Bougainville.

Gian (Giovanni) Domenico Mansi (1692–1769), an Italian prelate, theologian, scholar and historian.

- Sacrorum Conciliorum nova et amplissima collectio, 31 volumes (1759–1798), 53 volumes (1901–1927). Begun by Mansi, continued by Abbé Jean Baptiste Martin (1864–1922) and Louis Petit. Extensive edition of Church councils from the First Council of Nicaea in 325 through the Council of Florence in 1438. Includes the Canons of the Council of Clermont and other source material relevant to the Crusades.

François-Louis Claude Marin. François-Louis Claude Marin (1721–1803), a French editor and journalist who wrote a biography of Saladin. (cf. French Wikipedia, François-Louis Claude Marin)

- Histoire de Saladin, Sulthan d'Egypte et de Syrie, 2 volumes (1758). An abridged history of the Ayyubid dynasty founded by Saladin. Includes critical, historical and geographical notes, with supporting documents and three maps of Jerusalem and Acre.
- Recueil d'opuscules concernant les ouvrages et les sentiments de nos philosophes modernes sur la religion (1765). A collection of pamphlets concerning the works and feelings of our modern philosophers on religion. With Genevan theologian Jacob Vernes (1728–1791).

Richard Hurd (1720–1808), an English Anglican bishop and essayist.

- Letters on Chivalry and Romance (1762). An early literary criticism on the use of chivalry in romance literature and poetry, regarded as a stimulant to such writings.

Horatio Walpole, 4th Earl of Orford (1717–1797), an English politician, writer and art historian who claimed a Crusader pedigree.

- The Castle of Otranto (1764). An adaptation of an Italian story set at the time of the Crusades, regarded as the first gothic novel. Later edition edited by English literary critic Caroline F. E. Spurgeon (1869–1942) includes a preface by the editor and an introduction by Sir Walter Scott.

William Robertson (1721–1793), a Scottish historian. Regarded, with David Hume and Edward Gibbon, as one of the great historians of the British Enlightenment.

- History of the Reign of the Emperor Charles the Fifth, 3 volumes (1769). An account of the reign of Holy Roman Emperor Charles V, who ruled 1519–1556. Volume 1 covers the period from the subversion of the Roman empire until the beginning of the 16th century. This includes an account of what Robertson calls the "dark ages" of 700–1100, covering the First Crusade. The later Crusades through 1291 are covered as well as later activities against the Turks in the Smyrniote Crusades (1343–1351). In addition, the privileges and indulgences of the Crusades are discussed. Volume 2 begins with the birth of Charles in 1500 and goes through 1541. Volume 3 continues through 1557.
- The Works of William Robertson, D.D., 8 volumes (1840). Includes the History of Scotland (Volumes 1-2) and History of Charles V (Volumes 3-5), with a biography of the author by Scottish philosopher Dugald Stewart (1753–1828).
- A History of the Middle Ages, 3 volumes in 1 (1850). A later edition of Robertson's 1769 work. Describing the progress of society in Europe from the subversion of the Roman Empire to the beginning of the sixteenth century, confirmed by historical proofs and illustrations: and the history of the reign of the emperor of Germany, Charles V, and of all the kingdoms and states of Europe during his age. The first section discusses the Crusades and chivalry from a societal and philosophical view, rather than historically.

Edward Gibbon (1737–1794), an English historian. Gibbon presented the Crusades as "heroism as a cultural rather than merely personal feature, an active energy that, once freed of savage fanaticism, offered future advantages to the West." He was among the first to assign numbers to the First through Seventh Crusades and treat them unequivocally as a movement.

- History of the Decline and Fall of the Roman Empire, 6 volumes (1776–1789). Later editions edited by English historian Henry H. Milman (1791–1868) and by British historian J. B. Bury (1861–1927). Gibbon's view of the Crusades focused on the clash of religions and cultures.
- The Crusades, A.D. 1095–1261 (1869). Excerpts from Gibbon's main tome (Chapters LIX, LX). History of the Holy Land from the time of the Fatimid and Abbasid caliphates and Seljuk sultanate, the lure of the pilgrimage, and the chronology from the First Crusade 1096 until the recovery of Constantinople by the Greeks in 1261, and the loss of Acre in 1291. Additions on chivalry by English historian Henry Hallam (1777–1859). With an essay on chivalry and romance by Scottish novelist Sir Walter Scott and a discussion of the siege of Rhodes in 1480 through the translation of Gulielmus Caoursin's Obsidionis Rhodiæ urbis descriptio (edition 1490) by English poet John Caius.
- The life and letters of Edward Gibbon: with his History of the Crusades (1872). Autobiographical memoirs of Edward Gibbon, with his correspondence. Includes a reprint of his The Crusades, A.D. 1095–1261.

Wilhelm Albert Bachiene. (1712–1783), a German cartographer.

- Historische und geographische beschreibung von Palästina, 7 volumes (1766–1775). The history and geography of the Holy Land according to its past and present, along with the associated landcharts.

George François Berthereau (Dom Berthereau). George François Berthereau (1732–1792), a French orientalist and member of the Congrégation of Saint Maur. (cf. French Wikipedia, George François Berthereau)

- Historians of the Crusades, 31 volumes (eighteenth century). Material from oriental authors collected for a new history of the Crusades, eventually to form part of Recueil des historiens des croisades.
- The Collection of Dom Berthereau (eighteenth century). The French Revolution put an end to the scientific publishing projects of the Saint Maur, and Berthereau left in manuscript a General History of the Crusades, translated from Arabic, and a Bibliography of the Crusades. His manuscripts are kept in the manuscripts department of the Bibliothèque nationale de France (the so-called collection of Dom Berthereau, 31 volumes).
- Inventaire des matériaux rassemblés par les Bénédictins au xviiie siècle pour la publication des historiens des croisades: Collection dite de Dom Berthereau (1882). An inventory of Berthereau's collection, edited by French historian Paul E. D. Riant.
- Notice des Manuscrits laissés par Dom Berthereau, religieux bénédictin de la c. de S. Maur, mort en 1794 (1801). A notice of the life and works of Berthereau by French orientalist Silvestre de Sacy.
- Les origines du recueil des "historiens des croisades" (1919). A study of the origins of Recueil des historiens des croisades, by French historian and geographer Henri Dehérain.

Jean Baptiste Mailly. (1744–1794), a French traveler and historian.

- Poésies diverses de deux amis, ou Pièces fugitives (1768). Various poems on travel, including Epître à mon fils, sur les voyages.
- L'Esprit des Croisades: ou, Histoire politique et militaire des guerres entreprises, 4 volumes (1780). The political and military history of the Crusades. Political and military history of the wars undertaken by the Christians against the Muslims (Mahometans) for the recovery of the Holy Land during the 11th, 12th and 13th centuries, providing an exhaustive list of Crusader historians through the 18th century. Volume I is concerned with pilgrimages to the Holy Land, the rise of Islam, and the advent of the Seljuk Turks. Volume II is concerned with the situation in Europe. Volumes III and IV discuss the First Crusade through the death of Godfrey of Bouillon, and beyond.

Giovanni Filippo Mariti. (1736–1806), an Italian antiquarian, scientist and historian. (cf. Italian Wikipedia, Giovanni Mariti)

- Travels in the Island of Cyprus (1769). With contemporary accounts of the Ottoman-Venetian war including the siege of Nicosia in 1570 and siege of Famagusta in 1571 Translated from the Italian by British colonial official Claude Delaval Cobham.
- Istoria del Tempio della Resurrezione, o sia della Chiesa del Santo Sepolcro in Gerusalemme, detta dai Greci Anastasis e Martyrion (1784). History of the Temple of the Resurrection, or the Church of the Holy Sepulcher in Jerusalem, known by the Greeks as Anastasis and Martyrion.
- Cronologia de' Re Latini di Gerusalemme (1784). Chronology of the Latin Kings of Jerusalem, from Godfrey of Bouillon through James III of Cyprus, who died as a child in 1474. The completion of his 1769 work on Cyprus, adding a chronology not only of all the Latin kings who had ruled the city of Jerusalem, but also of those who, having lost the dominion of the capital, continued to govern in Syria, on the island of Cyprus and in Armenia. He omits the research relating to the royal houses of Europe, which by inheritance still claimed the title of king of Jerusalem.
- Travels through Cyprus, Syria, and Palestine; with a general history of the Levant, 2 volumes (1792). Translated from the Italian.
- Mariti's Travels. In A Collection of Late Voyages and Travels (1797) by Scottish writer Robert Heron.
- Histoire de l'état présent de Jérusalem, par l'abbé Mariti (1853). An edition of G. Mariti's work published by Justin Taylor (Laorti-Hadji).

René-Prosper Tassin (1697–1777), a French historian and Maurist.

- Histoire littéraire de la congregation de Saint-Maur (1770). An account of the works of the Congregation of Saint Maur beginning in 1618, later updated by the Bibliothèque des écrivains de la Congrégation de Saint-Maur (1882) compiled by German librarian Karl von Lama.
- Supplément à l'Histoire littéraire de la Congrégation de Saint-Maur (1881). A supplement to Histoire littéraire de la congregation de Saint-Maur by Ulysse Robert.

Gotthold Ephraim Lessing (1729–1781), a German writer and philosopher.

- Nathan der Weise (1779). A play set in Jerusalem during the Third Crusade. Describes how a Jewish merchant Nathan, Saladin, and an anonymous Knight Templar bridge the gaps between Judaism, Islam, and Christianity.

Pierre Chiniac de La Bastide. (1741–1811), a French politician and author. (cf. French Wikipedia, Pierre Chiniac de La Bastide)

- Capitularia Regum Francorum, 2 volumes (1780). Second edition of the 1677 work Capitularia Regum Francorum by French scholar Étienne Baluze. A collection of capitularies of the kings of France, including the Merovingian kings, Pepin the Short, Charlemagne and Louis the Pious, For the period after 840, the work includes the collections of Saint Ansegisus (9th century) and those of the forged Benedictus Levita. Finally, the work presents the capitularies of Charles the Bald and later Carolingian kings.

Jean-Baptiste de La Curne de Sainte-Palaye (1697–1781), a French historian, classicist, philologist and lexicographer.

- Mémoires sur l'ancienne chevalerie: considérée comme un établissement politique & militaire, 3 volumes (1781). Memoirs of ancient chivalry. With a preface by Jean-Pierre de Bougainville (1722–1763).
- Memoirs of Ancient Chivalry: to which are added, the anecdotes of the times, from the romance writers and historians of those ages (1784). Translated by Susannah Dawson Dobson (died 1795).
- Memoirs of the Life of Froissart (1801). A biography of Belgian historian Jean Froissart (c. 1337 – c. 1405), to which is added some account of the manuscript of his Chronicle in the Elizabethian library at Breslau, and a complete index by Thomas Johnes.

Johann Georg Meusel (1743–1820), a German bibliographer, lexicographer and historian.

- Bibliotheca historica, 11 volumes (1782–1804). The history of Palestine, Syria and Arabia is presented in Volume 2, and that of Egypt in Volume 3. The work is a revision of a work by German librarian and historian Burkhard G. Struve. Used as a source for Bibliographia Geographica Palestinæ by Titus Tobler.

Salvator Lusignan. Salvator (Sauveur) Lusignan (fl. late 18th century), a French biographer and traveler most noted for his biography of Mamluk leader in Egypt Ali Bey al-Kabir (1728–1773). His travels were documented in Titus Tobler's Bibliographia Geographica Palestinæ (1867).

- A History of the Revolt of Ali Bey, against the Ottoman Porte. (1783). Including an account of the form of government of Egypt: together with a description of Grand Cairo and of several celebrated places in Egypt, Palestine, and Syria: to which are added, a short account of the present state of the Christians who are subjects to the Turkish government, and the journal of a gentleman who travelled from Aleppo to Bassora.
- Journey to Turkey and part of the Levant: With a description of Palestine (1789). From A Series of Letters addressed to Sir William Fordyce. Containing A Voyage and Journey from England to Smyrna, from thence to Constantinople, and from that Place over Land to England.

Richard Warner (1763–1857), an English clergyman and writer.

- Netley Abbey: a Gothic Story, 2 volumes (1795). A novel whose hero is a participant in Lord Edward's Crusade of 1271–1272.

The Religious Tract Society was founded in London in 1799 to publish Christian literature.

- The Crusades (1800). A history of the Crusades from 622–1291. Numbered Crusades as First through Eighth, plus Last. Commentary on political and religious ramifications of the Crusades.

Sharon Turner (1768–1847), an English historian. Turner's historical work was acknowledged by Sir Walter Scott in his introduction to Ivanhoe.

- History of the Anglo-Saxons, 3 volumes (1799–1805). A history of England up to the Norman conquest.
- The History of England during the Middle Ages, 5 volumes (1814). English history from the reign of William the Conqueror to the accession of Henry VIII. The origins of Islam in the Holy Land and history of the First and Second Crusades are found in Chapter IX. Chapter X covers Richard I of England.
- The History of England, 12 volumes (1839). An account covering all of English history up to 1603. The Crusades are considered in Chapter X of Volume 4, with Chapter XI devoted to the reign of Richard I of England. Turner's discussions on the Crusades were called out by Charles Mills as reflecting his negative view of the First Crusaders.

== Nineteenth century ==
The nineteenth century saw Crusader historians develop in three separate schools, French, English and German. Arabic and Turkish historians also made a re-emergence, as well as continued translations of original sources.

=== The French school of historians ===
Principal French historians of the Crusades are:

Antoine Isaac Silvestre de Sacy (1758–1838), a French linguist and orientalist.

- Notice des Manuscrits laissés par Dom Berthereau, religieux bénédictin de la c. de S. Maur, mort en 1794 (1801). Notice concerning the oriental manuscripts collected by French orientalist George François Berthereau for his unpublished Historiens des croisades (Historians of the Crusades).
- Specimen historiae arabum by Bar Hebraeus (1806). Observations of Arab history by Syriac historian Bar Hebraeus (1226–1286).
- Mémoire sur la dynastie des Assassins et sur l'origine de leur nom (1809). A short history of the Assassins. With a controversial discussion on the origins of their name, following Marco Polo's assertion that the name was derived from the use of hashish. De Sacy's work pointed to Islamic texts, but has been refuted by modern scholars including historians Bernard Lewis and Farhad Daftary.
- Account of Egypt (Relation de l'Égypte) (1810). By Arab historian Abd al-Latif al-Baghdadi (1162–1231). Arabic document first discovered and published by Edward Pococke. His son, Edward Pococke the Younger, then translated a fragment of the work into Latin. Thomas Hunt began the task of completing the translation but did not finish. The Latin translation was completed by Joseph White. The work was then translated into French, with valuable notes, by de Sacy.
- Mémoire sur une correspondance inédite de Tamerlan avec Charles VI (1822). Correspondence between Charles VI of France and Turco-Mongol commander Tamerlane (1336–1405). In Mémoires de l'Académie des Inscriptions, Volume VI.
- Les séances de Hariri, publiées en arabe avec un commentaire choisi by Ḥarīrī (1822). Translation of the work of Arab poet al-Harīrī (1030–1122). Second edition of 1847 edited by Joseph Derenbourg and Joseph Toussaint Reinaud.
- Recherches sur l'initiation à la secte des Ismaéliens (1824). A history of the Assassins (literally, the sect of Isma'ilis).
- Alfiyya: ou, La quintessence de la grammaire arabe, ouvrage de Djémal-eddin Mohammed, connu sous le nom d'Ebn-Malec (1833). Translation of Al-Alfiyya by Arab grammarian ibn Malik (1203–1274).
- Bibliothèque de M. le baron Silvestre de Sacy, 3 volumes (1846).

François C. H. L. Pouqueville (1770–1838), a French diplomat, writer, explorer, physician and historian.

- Voyage en Morée, à Constantinople, en Albanie, 3 volumes (1805).
- Travels through the Morea, Albania, and other parts of the Ottoman empire to Constaninople: during the years 1798, 1799, 1800, and 1801 (1806).
- Mémoire historique et diplomatique sur le commerce et les établissements français au Levant, depuis l'an 500 jusqu'à la fin du XVII siècle (1833).

Étienne Marc Quatremère (1782–1857), a French orientalist.

- Recherches ... sur la langue et la littérature de l'Egypte (1808). A study of the language of ancient Egypt and its relationship with the Coptic language.
- Mémoires géographiques et historiques sur l'Égypte… sur quelques contrées voisines, 2 volumes (1811). The publication of Quatremère's Mémoires forced French orientalist Jean-François Champollion (1790–1832), the decoder of the Rosetta stone, to prematurely publish an introduction to his L'Égypte sous les pharaons (1814). Since both works concerned the Coptic names of Egyptian towns, Champollion was incorrectly accused by some of plagiarism.
- History of the Ayyubit and Mameluke Rulers, 2 volumes (1837–1845). French translation of a work by Egyptian historian al-Makrizi.
- Prolégomènes d'Ebn-Khaldoun (1858). Editor of a translation of Al-Muqaddimah, the work on the universal history of empires, by Arab historian Ibn Khaldūn (died 1406).

Joseph François Michaud (1767–1839), a French historian and publisist, specializing in the Crusades. In 1830, he travelled to the Holy Land in order provide more realistic accounts of his Histoire. He was unable to complete the final edition.

- Histoire des Croisades, 3 volumes (1812–1822). Edited by his friend historian Jean J. F. Poujoulat (1808–1880). Updated to an improved edition with 4 volumes (or, 6 volumes in some printings) by Jean L. A. Huillard-Bréholles (Paris, 1862). A history of the Crusades that includes 40 appendices with original source material, primarily contemporary letters. Histoire has been regarded as the starting point of modern Crusades studies and it was under the influence of this publication that the Académie des Inscriptions et Belles-Lettres decided to publish the collection of historians of the Crusades in the Recueil des historiens des croisades. Translation published in 1881 (see below).
- Bibliothèque des Croisades, 4 volumes (1829). Bibliography of works on the Crusades, with French orientalist Joseph T. Reinaud.
- Nouvelle collection des mémoires pour servir à l'histoire de France, 32 volumes (1836–1844). Edited with Jean Poujoulat.
- Biographie universelle, ancienne et moderne, 45 volumes (1843–1865). A biographical dictionary.
- The History of the Crusades, 3 volumes (1852). Translated by British author William Robson (1785–1863). With a biographical notice on Michaud and preface and supplementary chapter by American essayist Hamilton W. Mabie (1846–1916). Covers the period 300–1095, the First through Eighth Crusades, attempted Crusades against the Turks from 1291–1396, Crusades against the Turks from 1453–1481, and commentary on the status of Europe from 1571–1685.
- History of the Crusades, 2 volumes (1875). An edition of Histoire des Croisades, translated by W. Robson, and illustrated by Gustave Doré with 100 grand compositions.
- The Saracen (1810). Or, Matilda and Malek Adhel, a Crusade romance. From the French work of Mme. Sophie Cottin (1770–1807), with an historical introduction.

Jean Joseph François Poujoulat (1808–1880), a French historian and journalist.

- Histoire des Croisades, 6 volumes (1812–1822). With Joseph François Michaud, updated by Jean L. A. Huillard-Bréholles in 1862.
- Nouvelle collection des mémoires pour servir à l'histoire de France, 32 volumes (1836–1844). With Joseph Michaud.
- Histoire de Richard Ier Cœur de Lion, duc d'Aquitaine et de Normandie, roi d'Angleterre (1837). A biography of Richard I of England.
- Histoire de Jérusalem (1840–1842). A religious and philosophical study.
- Histoire de la conquète et de l'occupation de Constantinople par les Latins (1868). An account of the sack and subsequent occupation of Constantinople by the Franks in 1204.
- Histoire des Croisades, abrégée à l'usage de la jeunesse (1883). Abridged version of Histoire des Croisades for juvenile readers.

Adrien-Jean-Quentin Beuchot. Adrien-Jean-Quentin Beuchot (1777–1851), a French bibliographer.

- Dictionnaire historique et critique de Pierre Bayl, 16 volumes (1820). New edition of the Dictionnaire Historique et Critique (Historical and Critical Dictionary) begun by French philosopher and writer Pierre Bayle (1647–1706).

François Guizot. François Pierre Guillaume Guizot (1787–1874), a French historian, orator, and statesman who published a collection of original or transcribed documents, many of which are of particular relevance to the Crusades.

- Collection des mémoires relatifs à l'histoire de France, 31 volumes (1823–1835). Editor-in-chief, Guizot. Depuis la fondation de la monarchie française jusqu'au 13e siècle, avec une introduction, des supplémens, des notices et des notes. A collection of original (or translated) documents on the history of France from the founding of the French monarchy until the thirteenth century, with an introduction, supplements, notices and notes.
- Historical documents by Gregory of Tours, Einhard, Ermoldus Nigellus, Flodoard, Abbo II of Metz, Radolfus Glaber, Adelberon and Suger in Volumes 1-8 of Collection des mémoires.
- A French translation of Dei gesta per Francos by Guibert of Nogent; the autobiography of Guibert; and the biography of Bernard of Clairvaux by William of St-Thierry. In Volumes 9–10 of Collection des mémoires.
- Gesta Philippi Augusti by Rigord (c. 1150 – c. 1209); Gesta Philippi H. regis Francorum and the poem Philippide by William the Breton (c. 1165 – c. 1225); and the Latin epic Gesta Ludovici VIII by Nicholas of Bray, in Volumes 11–12 of Collection des mémoires.
- Chronicon, a universal history from Creation to 1300, by Guillaume de Nangis (died 1300), in Volume 13 of Collection des mémoires.
- Historia Albigensis, a chronicle of the Albigensian Crusade, by Peter of Vaux de Cernay (died c. 1218), in Volume 14 of Collection des mémoires.
- Cronica, a history of Catharism and the Albigensian Crusade by Guillaume de Puylaurens (1200–1274), in Volume 19 of Collection des mémoires.
- Historia Rerum in Partibus Transmarinis Gestarum by William of Tyre, in Volumes 16–19 of Collection des mémoires.
- Historia Hierosolymitanae expeditionis by Albert of Aachen, in Volumes 20–21 of Collection des mémoires.
- Historia Orientalis (Historia Hierosolymitana) by James of Vitry (1160/1170–1240), in Volume 22 of Collection des mémoires.
- The Deeds of Tancred in the Crusade by Ralph of Caen and Historia Hierosolymitana by Robert the Mon, in Volume 23 of Collection des mémoires.
- Gesta Francorum Iherusalem Perefrinantium by Fulcher of Chartres and De profectione Ludovici VII in Orientem by Odo of Deuil in Volume 24 of Collection des mémoires.
- The Ecclesiastical History of England and Normandy (1853–1856), in Bohn's Libraries. Translation of work by Orderic Vitalis, with introduction by Guizot and critical notice by Léopold V. Delisle. Also in Collection des mémoires, Volumes 25–27.
- Histories of the Normans by William of Jumièges (c. 1000 – after 1070) and William of Poitiers (c. 1020–1090), in Volumes 28–29 of Collection des mémoires.

Honoré de Balzac. Honoré de Balzac (1799–1850), a French novelist and playwright.

- Clotilde de Lusignan: ou, Le beau juif, 4 volumes (1823). A romance and historical novel about John II of Jerusalem, inspired by Scott's Ivanhoe. (cf. French Wikipedia, Clotilde de Lusignan)

Joseph Toussaint Reinaud. Joseph Toussaint Reinaud (1795–1867), a French orientalist.

- Notice sur la vie de Saladin: sultan d'Egypte et de Syrie (1824). A short biographical work on Saladin.
- Histoire de la sixième croisade et de la prise de Damiette (1826). An account of the Fifth Crusade and the siege of Damietta in 1218–1219.
- Bibliothèque des Croisades, 4 volumes (1829). A bibliography of the Crusades, with Joseph François Michaud.
- Extraits des historiens arabes (1829). Translation of Muslim works related to the Crusades.
- Géographie d'Aboulféda (1840). Translation of Taqwim al-Buldan (A Sketch of the Countries) by Kurdish historian and geographer Abu'l-Fida (1273–1331).
- Ancient accounts of India and China (1845). Edition of the very curious records of early Arab intercourse with China of which Eusèbe Renaudot had given but an imperfect translation in 1733.
- Fragments arabes et persans inédits relatifs à l'Inde, antérieurement au XIe siècle de l'ère chrétienne (1845). Unpublished Arab and Persian fragments relating to India prior to the 11th century.
- Les séances de Hariri, publiées en arabe avec un commentaire choisi by Ḥarīrī (1822, 1847). Translation of the work of Arab poet al-Harīrī (1030–1122). With French orientalist Antoine Isaac Silvestre de Sacy and Franco-German orientalist Joseph Derenbourg.

Jean Alexandre Buchon. Jean Alexandre Buchon (1791–1849). a French historian.

- Collection des chroniques nationales français, 47 volumes (1824–1828): Works from the 13th through the 16th centuries:écrites en langue vulgaire du treizième au seizième siècle. Includes material relevant to the Fourth Crusade and Latin states in Greece. This includes Geoffrey of Villehardouin's chronicle De la Conquête de Constantinople, Robert de Clari's La Conquête de Constantinople, the Chronicle of Ramon Muntaner, and a new edition of du Cange's Histoire de l'empire de Constantinople sous les empereurs françois.
- Chronique de la conquête de Constantinople et de l'établissement des français en Morée (1825). Chronicle of the conquest of Constantinople and the establishment of the French in the Morea.
- Recherches et matériaux pour servir à une histoire de la domination française: aux XIIIe, XIVe et XVe siècles dans les provinces démembrées de l'Empire Grec à la suite de la quatrième croisade, 2 volumes (1840). Research and materials to serve a history of French domination: in the 13th, 14th and 15th centuries in the dismembered provinces of the Greek Empire following the Fourth Crusade. Includes Histoire de l'empereur Henri de Constantinople (1210) by Henri de Valenciennes (fl. 13th century) and De la Conquête de Constantinople by Geoffrey de Villehardouin.
- Recherches historiques sur la principauté française de Morée (1845). Historical research on the French principality of Morée (Morea) and its high baronies. Conquest and feudal establishment from 1205–1333.
- Atlas des nouvelles recherches historiques sur la principauté française de Morée et ses hautes baronies fondées à la suite de la quatrième croisade (1845). Forming the second part of this work and serving as a complement to the historical, genealogical and numismatic clarification of the French principality of the Morea and to the journey in Morea, mainland Greece, the Cyclades and the Ionian Island.

François Pouqueville. François Charles Hugues Laurent Pouqueville (1770–1838), a French diplomat and historian.

- Mémoire historique et diplomatique sur le commerce et les établissements français au Levant, depuis l'an 500 jusqu'à la fin du XVII siècle (1833). An account of the historical and diplomatic activities of French commerce and establishments in the Levant, from the year 500 through the end of the seventeenth century. In Mémoires de l'Institut de France, Volume X.

Jean Charles Léonard de Sismondi. Jean Charles Léonard de Sismondi (1773–1842), a Swiss historian and economist.

- History of the crusades against the Albigenses in the thirteenth century (1833). An account of the Albigensian Crusade, extracted from de Sismondi's Histoire des Français.

Nicholas Rudolphe Taranne. Nicolas Rudolphe Taranne (1795–1857), a French historian. Secretary to the Comité des travaux historiques et scientifiques from 1838 to 1857.

- Historia Francorum (1836). Translation of the sixth-century text of Gregory of Tours (538–594) in which chronicles events in the history of France from the Creation through his own term as Bishop of Tours.
- Histoire ecclésiastique des Francs, 2 volumes (1836).
- Les familles d'outremer (unpublished). Genealogy of the royal families of the Kingdom of Jerusalem through 1244. By the decree of the Minister of Public Instruction, 1854, the publication and completion of Du Cange's unfinished work was entrusted to Taranne. After the latter's death it was continued by Emmanuel Guillaume-Rey (1869).
- Répertoire biographique généalogique et historique des croisés et des familles établies dans les royaumes de Jérusalem, de Chypre et d'Arménie. Extension of Les familles d'outremer to 1291.

Alexis Paulin Paris. Alexis Paulin Paris (1800–1881), a French philologist and author.

- Grandes chroniques de France, 6 volumes (1836–1840). Alexis Paris, editor. Traces the history of the French kings from their origins in Troy to the death of Philip II of France (1223). Its final form brought the chronicle down to the death of Charles V of France in the 1380s. Source material included Historia Caroli Magni and Vita Karoli Magni.
- Oeuvres complètes du roi René, 4 volumes (1844). Editor of the works of René of Anjou (1409–1480), king of Naples and titular king of Jerusalem.
- La Chanson d'Antioche (edition 1848). Twelfth-century chanson de geste about the sieges of Antioch and Jerusalem. Original author identified as Ricard le Pèlerin and recast by Graindor de Douai. Mostly forgotten until 1848 when Alexis Paris published an edition translated by French politician Louis-Clair de Beaupoil comte de Saint-Aulaire (1778–1854). De Beaupoil also translated Goethe's Faust.
- Les historiens des croisades: discours d'ouverture du cours de langue et litterature du Moyen Age. The historians of the crusades: opening speech of the language course and literature of the Middle Ages.
- Les aventures de maître Renart et d'Ysengrin, son compère (1861). A version of the story of the fabled anthropomorphic Reynard the Fox. Other versions include ones by Chaucer and Goethe.
- Guillaume de Tyr et ses continuateurs: texte français du XIIIe siècle, 2 volumes (1879–1880). Translation of the Historia Rerum in Partibus Transmarinis Gestarum by William of Tyre.

Jean Louis Alphonse Huillard-Bréholles. Jean Louis Alphonse Huillard-Bréholles (1817–1871), a French archivist and historian. (cf. German Wikipedia, Alphonse Huillard-Bréholles)

- Grande chronique de Matthieu Paris, 9 volumes (1840–1841). An edition of the Grand chronique by English chronicler Matthew Paris (c. 1200–1259). Edited by Huillard-Bréholles. With an introduction by French nobleman Charles-Philippe d'Albert Duc de Luynes (1695–1758), who had also written a memoir of Louis XV of France.
- La grande chronique de Richard I Coeur de Lion 1189–1199 (1840). Volume 2 of Grande chronique de Matthieu Paris.
- Recherches sur les monuments et l'histoire des Normands et de la maison de Souabe dans l'Italie méridionale (1844),
- La fondation de la maison de Souabe dans l'italie méridionale (1844)
- Historia diplomatica Frederici secundi, 6 volumes (1852–1861). A history of the diplomacy of Frederick II, Holy Roman Emperor. Under the auspices of French nobleman Honoré Théodoric d'Albert de Luynes (1802–1867).
- Histoire des Croisades, 6 volumes (1849). Update of the classic work of Joseph F. Michaud (1767–1839).
- Vie et correspondance de Pierre de La Vigne, Ministre de l'Empereur Frédéric II: avec une étude sur le mouvement réformiste au XIIIe siècle (1864). The account of Frederick II's advisor and prime minister, Pietro della Vigne.

Recueil des historiens des croisades (RHC). A history of the Crusades that was begun by the Congregation of St. Maur in the eighteenth century by Dom George F. Berthereau. Publication was precluded by the French Revolution, but later turned into a general collection of Crusader sources for the Académie des Inscriptions et Belles-Lettres, resulting in the collection Recueil des historiens des croisades.

- Historians of the Crusades, 31 volumes (eighteenth century). Material from oriental authors collected by French orientalist George François Berthereau (1732–1792).
- Notice des Manuscrits laissés par Dom Berthereau, religieux bénédictin de la c. de S. Maur, mort en 1794 (1801). Notice by French orientalist Antoine Isaac Silvestre de Sacy (1758–1838) concerning the manuscripts collected by Dom Berthereau.
- Recueil des historiens des croisades, 16 volumes (1841–1906). Regarded as the best general collection of original Crusaders sources, containing many of the Latin, Arabic, Greek, Armenian and Syriac authorities, and also the text of the Assizes (laws).
- Inventaire des matériaux rassemblés par les Bénédictins au xviiie siècle pour la publication des historiens des croisades: Collection dite de Dom Berthereau (1882). An inventory of Berthereau's collection, edited by French historian Paul E. D. Riant.
- Les origines du recueil des "historiens des croisades" (1919). A study of the origins of Recueil des historiens des croisades, by French historian and geographer Henri Dehérain.

Auguste-Arthur Beugnot. Auguste-Arthur Beugnot (1797–1865), French historian and statesman.

- Assises de Jérusalem ou Recueil des ouvrages de jurisprudence composés pendant le XIIIe siècle dans les royaumes de Jérusalem et de Chypre, 2 volumes (1841–1843). A treatise on the Assizes of Jerusalem, in Recueil des historiens des croisades lois (RHC Lois).

Charles Defrémery. Charles Defrémery (1822–1883), a French orientalist, specializing in Arabic and Persian history and literature.

- Histoire des sultans du Kharezm, par Mirkhond. Texte persan, accompagné de notes historiques, géographiques et philologiques (1842). A translation of the work by Mīr-Khvānd concerning the Khwarazmian dynasty in the eleventh through thirteenth centuries.
- Histoire des Seldjoukides et des Ismaéliens ou assassins de l'Iran. Translation of a work by Persian historian Hamd-Allah Mustawfi.
- Recherches sur le règne de Barkiarok, sultan seldjoukide (485-498 de l'hégire: 1092–1104 de l'ère chrétienne) (1853). A biography of the Seljuk sultan Barkyaruq.
- Voyages d'Ibn Battuta, 4 volumes (1853–1859). A translation of the work of Moroccan explorer Ibn Battuta.
- Mémoires d'histoire orientale, suivis de Mélanges de critique, de philologie et de géographie (1854).
- Gulistan, ou le Parterre de roses, par Sadi, traduit du persan et accompagné de notes historiques, géographiques et littéraires (1858). A translation of the Gulistan (The Flower Garden), written in 1258, by Persian poet Saadi Shirazi (1210–1292).
- Mémoire sur cette question: Jérusalem a-t-elle été prise par l'armée du calife d'Égypte pendant l'année 1096 ou dans l'année 1098? (1872). A discussion on the Fatimid capture of Jerusalem in the late eleventh century.

Salles des Croisades. The Salles des Croisades (Hall of Crusades) opened at the Palace of Versailles in 1843 and houses over 120 paintings related to the Crusades. Historiographers of the Crusades frequently use the gallery to demonstrate their popularity in the nineteenth century.

Vincent-Victor Henri Viénot de Vaublanc. Vincent-Victor Henri Viénot de Vaublanc (1803–1874), a French writer and artist. (cf. French Wikipedia, Vincent-Victor Henri Viénot de Vaublanc)

- La France au temps des croisades: ou, Recherches sur les moeurs et coutumes des Français aus XIIe et XIIIe siècles, 4 volumes (1844–1847). Mores and customs of France at the time of the Crusades, twelfth and thirteenth centuries.
- Material for Literature from the Crusades (1904). An essay in Medieval Civilization: Selected Studies from European Authors, edited by American historian Dana C. Munro.

Jacques Paul Migne. Jacques Paul Migne (1800–1875), a French priest and scholar.

- Patrologiae Cursus Completus. The collected works of Patrologia Latina and Patrologia Graeco-Latina.
- Patrologia Latina (MPL), 221 volumes (1844–1855). Writing of the Church fathers and other ecclesiastical writers from AD 230–1216 edited by J. P. Migne. Volume 155 is of particular interest to the Crusades, with biographical material on Godfrey of Bouillon, original texts, and other documents on the kingdom through 1250.
- Patrologia Graeco-Latina (MPG), 161 volumes (1857–1866). Edited by J. P. Migne and updated by Italian theologian Ferdinand Cavallera (1875–1954). Writing of the Church fathers and other secular writers in Greek from the third century to the fifteenth century.

Carl Benedict Hase. Carl Benedict (Charles-Benoît) Hase (1780–1864), a French Hellenist.

- Recueil des Itinéraires Anciens (1845). A collection of ancient routes including the Antonine Itinerary, the Tabula Peutingeriana and assorted Greek tours.
- Recueil des historiens des croisades, historiens grecs (RHC Gr.), 2 volumes (1875–1881). The Greek volumes of RHC were edited by C. Hase.

Thomas de Reiffenberg. Frédéric Auguste Ferdinand Thomas de Reiffenberg (1795–1850), a Belgian writer, historian-medievalist, and linguist.

- Chronique rimée de Philippe Mouskes, 2 volumes (1836–1838). An edition of Chronique rimée by Philippe Mouskes (before 1220–1282). Portions reprinted in In Itinéraires à Jérusalem et descriptions de la Terre Sainte...(1882) by French historian Henri-Victor Michelant.
- Le Chevalier au cygne et Godefroid de Bouillon: poëme historique, 3 volumes (1846–1854). An edition of Le Chevalier au cygne (Knight of the Swan).

Ludovic Lalanne. Ludovic Lalanne (1815–1898), a French historian and librarian.

- Les Pèlerinages en Terre Sainte avant les Croisades (1845). Pilgrimages to the Holy Land before the Crusades, with a chronology covering from the journey of Saint Helen in 325 (sic) through Peter the Hermit in 1096. Used as a source for Tobler's Bibliographia Geographica Palestinæ.
- Essai sur le feu grégeois et sur la poudre à canon (1845). An essay on Greek fire and gunpowder.

René de Mont-Louis. René de Mont-Louis (1818–1883), a French historian who also wrote under the name Charles Farine.

- Histoire des Croisades (1846), writing as Charles Farine. Covering the First through Eighth Crusades, and the history of the Holy Land from 800–1453 and the influence of the Crusades on the West.
- La Croisade des enfant (1871). An account of the Children's Crusade of 1212.

Louis de Mas Latrie. Louis de Mas Latrie (1815–1897), a French historian specializing in medieval Cyprus.

- Monuments français existant dans l'île de Chypre (1850). In Journal général de l'instruction publique et des cultes, Tome 16 (1850).
- Inscriptions de Chypre et Constantinople (1850).
- Histoire de l'île de Chypre sous le règne des princes de la maison de Lusignan, 3 volumes (1852–1861). Includes Informatio ex parte Nunciorum Regis Cypri.
- Nouvelles Preuves del'Historie de Chypre, 3 works (1871–1874). Includes the anonymous fourteenth-century history of Cyprus Informatio ex parte Nunciorum Regis Cypri.
- Chronique d'Ernoul et de Bernard le Trésorier (1871). An edition of La Chronique d'Ernoul et de Bernard le trésorier (The Chronicle of Ernoul and Bernard the Treasurer), covering the Crusades over the period 1183–1197, by Ernoul (fl. 1187), a squire of Balian of Ibelin.
- La prise d'Alexandrie; ou, Chronique du roi Pierre Ier de Lusignan (1877). Edition of the fourteenth-century work of French poet Guillaume de Machaut, preface by L. de Mas Latrie.
- De quelques seigneuries de Terre-Sainte (1878).
- Les Comtes de Jaffa et d'Ascalon du XIIe au XIXe siècle (1879).
- Chronique de l'Ile de Chypre (1884). Translation of Floria Bustron's Historia overo commentarii de Cipro.
- Les Seigneurs d'Arsur en Terre Sainte (1894).

Jules Berger de Xivrey. Jules Berger de Xivrey (1801–1863), a French historian. (cf. French Wikipedia, Jules Berger de Xivrey)

- Mémoire sur la vie et les ouvrages de l'empereur Manuel Paléologue (1853). A memoir on the life and works of emperor Manuel II Palaiologus (1350–1425). In Mémoires de l'Institut de France, Volume XIX/2.

Léopold Victor Delisle. Léopold Victor Delisle (1826–1910), a French bibliophile and historian.

- The Ecclesiastical History of England and Normandy (1853–1856), in Bohn's Libraries. Translation of work by Orderic Vitalis, with introduction by François Guizot and critical notice by L. Delisle.
- Mémoire sur les actes d'Innocent III: suivi de l'Itinéraire de ce pontifs (1857). An account of the correspondence and acts of pope Innocent III.
- Recueil des historiens des Gaules et de la France (RHF), 24 volumes (1869–1904). New edition of Martin Bouquet's classical work.
- Mémoire sur les ouvrages de Guillaume de Nangis (1873). A commentary on the works of French chronicler and biographer Guillaume de Nangis (died 1300).
- Mémoire sur les opérations financières des Templiers (1889). A memoir on the financial transactions of the Knights Templar.

Jean-François-Aimé Peyré. Jean-François-Aimé Peyré (1792–1868), a French historian.

- Histoire de la Première Croisade, 2 volumes (1859).

Louis-Alexandre Foucher de Careil. Louis-Alexandre Foucher de Careil (1826–1891), a French politician and author. (cf. French Wikipedia, Louis-Alexandre Foucher de Careil)

- Oeuvres de Leibniz, 7 volumes (1859–1875). A collection of original manuscripts of German mathematician Gottfried W. Leibniz. Includes Leibniz' proposal for a new Crusade against the Ottomans, the Project de conquête l'Egypte présenté à Louis XIV (1671).

Marie Henri d'Arbois de Jubainville. Marie Henri d'Arbois de Jubainville (1827–1910), a French historian.

- Histoire des ducs et des comtes de Champagne, 6 volumes (1859–1866). With French historian Léon Pigeotte.
- Livre des vassaux du comté de Champagne et de Brie 1172–1222 (1869). With Auguste H. Longnon.
- Recueil des actes de Philippe Ier, roi de France (1059–1108) (1908). With French archivist Maurice Prou (1861–1930). A history of Philip I of France.

Léon Pigeotte. Léon Pigeotte (1811–1894), a French historian.

- Histoire des ducs et des comtes de Champagne, 6 volumes (1859–1866). With French historian Marie Henri d'Arbois de Jubainville.

Gustave Dugat. Gustave Dugat (1824–1894), a French orientalist.

- Histoire des orientalistes de l'Europe du XIIe au XIXe siècle, précédée d'une esquisse historique des études orientales, 2 volumes (1868–1870). A historical outline of the work of European orientalists.
- Histoire des philosophes et des théologiens musulmans (632–1258) (1878). A history of Islamic dynasties and scholars from the beginning until 1258.

Paul E. D. Riant. Paul Edouard Didier Riant (1836–1888), a French historian specializing on the Crusades.

- Expéditions et pèlerinages des Scandinaves en Terre sainte au temps des croisades, 2 volumes (1865–1869). Scandinavian expeditions and pilgrimages to the Holy Land during the Crusades. Includes the Norwegian Crusade of 1107–1111.
- Hystoria de desolacione et conculcacione civitatis Acconensis et tocius Terre Sancte, in A. D. 1291 (1874). By Italian magister Thaddeus of Naples. Edited by P. Riant.
- Notes sur les oeuvres de Gui de Bazaches (1877). Notes on the works of French cleric and Third Crusader Guy de Bazoches.
- La charte du maïs (1877). In Revue des questions historiques, Librairie de Victor Palmé, Volume XXI.
- Le changement de direction de la quatrième croisade: d'après quelques travaux récen. (1878). In Revue des questions historiques, Librairie de Victor Palmé, Volume XXIII.
- Inventaire critique des lettres historiques des croisades, 768-1100 (1880). A collections of letters relevant to the Crusades, 768–1110.
- Un récit perdu de la première croisade (1882). Extrait du Bulletin de la Société nationale des Antiquaires de France, Séance du 19 avril 1882, pp. 203–212.
- Un dernier triomphe d'Urbain II (1883), in Revue des questions historiques, juillet 1883, XXXIV, pp. 247–255.
- La Part de l'évêque de Bethléem dans le butin de Constantinople en 1204, (1886).
- Les Possessions de l'église de Bethléem en Gascogne (1887).
- Exuviae Sacrae Constantinoploitanae (1877–1888). A collection of documents edited by Paul Riant relating to the status of relics at Constantinople before 1204 and their disposition after the Fourth Crusade. A further study, La croix des premiers croisés; la sainte lance; la sainte couronne, was published by French archaeologist and art historian Fernand de Mély in 1904.
- Études sur l'histoire de l'église de Bethléem, 3 volumes (1889, 1896).
- Catalogue de la bibliothèque de feu M. le comte Riant, 2 volumes (1896). A bibliography of the works of Count Riant.

Emmanuel Guillaume-Rey. Emmanuel Guillaume-Rey (1837–1913), a French archaeologist, topographer and orientalist who wrote seminal works on the archaeology of the Holy Land.

- Essai sur la domination française en Syrie durant le moyen âge (1866). An essay on French domination in Syria during the Middle Ages
- Etude sur les monuments de l'architecture militaire des croisés en Syrie et dans l'île de Chypre (1871). A study on the monuments of the military architecture of the Crusaders in Syria and on Cyprus
- Les familles d'Outremer (1869). Original work by French historian Charles du Cange (1610–1688), extended by Guillaume-Rey. Genealogy of the royal families of the Kingdom of Jerusalem through 1244.
- Etudes sur les monuments de l'architecture militaire des croisés (1871). A study of Crusader fortifications in the Holy Land.

Auguste Honoré Longnon. Auguste Honoré Longnon (1844–1911), a French historian and archivist.

- Livre des vassaux du comté de Champagne et de Brie 1172–1222 (1869). With Henry d'Arbois de Jubainville.

Francisque Michel. Francisque Xavier Michel (1809–1887), a French historian and philologist.

- Le mystère de Saint Louis, roi de France (1871).

August Molinier. Auguste Molinier (1851–1904), a French palaeographer and historian.

- Catalogue des actes de Simon et d'Amaury de Montfort (1874). In Bibliothèque de l'École des chartes, Volume 34.
- Itinera hierosolymitana et descriptiones terrae sanctae bellis sacris anteriora (1879). Itineraries of pilgrimages to the Holy Land from the fourth through the eleventh century. Includes Bernard the Pilgrim (fl. 865), Saint Willibald (c. 700-c. 787), the Venerable Bede (c. 720), Arculf (fl. late seventh century), Theodosius' De situ terrae sanctae (530), Eucherius of Lyon (440), and Saint Paula of Rome (347-404) and her daughter Eustochium. Editor, with Swiss orientalist Titus Tobler and archivist Charles A. Kohler.
- Description de deux manuscrits contenant la règle de la Militia passionis Jhesu Christi de Philippe de Mézières (1881). A description of two works by French knight Philippe de Mézières.
- Les Sources de l'Histoire de France (des origines aux guerres d'Italie, 1494), 6 volumes (1901–1906). The sources of the history of France from the origins to the wars in Italy (1494).

Ernest Lavisse. Ernest Lavisse (1842–1922), a French historian nominated by the Nobel Prize in Literature five times.

- De Hermano Salzensi ordinis Teutonici magistro (1875). Dissertation for Doctor of Letters. A biography of Hermann von Salza (c. 1165–1239), fourth Grand Master of the Teutonic Knights.
- Ernest Lavisse et l'Histoire de l'Ordre teutonique (2004), by Gouguehneim Sylvain.

Gustave Doré. Paul Gustave Louis Christophe Doré (1832–1883) was a French artist, printmaker and illustrator.

- History of the Crusades, 2 volumes (1875). An edition of Joseph François Michaud's Histoire des Croisades, translated by William Robson. Illustrated by Gustave Doré with 100 grand compositions.
- Die Kreuzzüge und die Kultur ihrer Zeit (1884). The Crusades and the culture of their time, by Swiss writer Otto Henne am Rhyn (1828–1914). Illustrated by Gustave Doré with 101 plates.

Gabriel Hanotaux. Albert Auguste Gabriel Hanotaux (1853–1944), a French statesman and historian.

- Les Vénitiens ont-ils trahi la chrétienté en 1202 (1877). In Revue historique, Volume 4, 1877.

Henri Vast. Henri Vast (1847–1921), a French historian.

- Le Cardinal Bessarion (1403–1472), étude sur le chrétienté et la renaissance vers le milieu du XVe siècle (1878). A biographical study of cardinal Bessarion (1403–1472).
- Petite histoire de la grande guerre (1920). The English translation, A Little History of the Great War, was done by Raymond Weeks (1863–1954).

Clément Huart. Clément Huart (1854–1926), a French orientalist and translator of Persian, Turkish and Arabic documents.

- La poésie religieuse des Nosaïris (1880). Contains several fragments of poetry in Arabic and French translation.
- A History of Arabic Literature (1903). Translated by Lady Mary S. Loyd (1853–1936).

Ulysse Robert. Ulysse Robert (1845–1903), a French archivist.

- Supplément à l'Histoire littéraire de la Congrégation de Saint-Maur (1881). A supplement to Histoire littéraire de la congregation de Saint-Maur by René-Prosper Tassin.
- Histoire du Pape Calixte II (1891). A history of pope Callixtus II.

Henri-Victor Michelant. Henri-Victor Michelant (1811–1890), a French librarian, Romanist and medievalist.

- Itinéraires à Jérusalem et descriptions de la Terre Sainte, rédigés en français aux XIe, XIIe [et] XIIIe siècles (1882). With French historian Gaston Raynaud.

Gaston Raynaud. Gaston Raynaud (1850–1911), a French historian.

- Itinéraires à Jérusalem et descriptions de la Terre Sainte, rédigés en français aux XIe, XIIe [et] XIIIe siècles (1882). With French medievalist Henri-Victor Michelant.
- Les gestes des Chiprois: recueil de chroniques françaises écrites en Orient au XIIIe & XVIe siècles (1887). Translation for the Société de l'Orient latin by Raynaud. Raynaud's version of Les gestes des Chiprois is found in both RHC Documents arméniens (1869–1906), Volume 2.VI, and Revue de l'Orient Latin (ROL), Volumes XIIIe, XIVe.
- An edition of the Annales de Terre Sainte, 1095–1291 (1884). With German historian Reinhold Röhricht. The Annales de Terre Sainte is a series of chronological entries recounting the history of the Crusades and the Latin East from 1095–1291. The Annales tradition proved popular enough that it was copied into a number of compilation manuscripts, such as the Gestes des Chiprois.

Étienne Antoine Vlasto. Étienne Antoine Vlasto (born 1831), a French historian.

- 1453: Les derniers jours de Constantinople (1883). In five parts: the last days of Constantinople: End of the reign of John VIII Palaiologos; new attempts to bring about the union of the two churches; advent of Constantine XI Palaiologos; the siege and capture of Constantinople.

Léon Gautier. Émile Théodore Léon Gautier (1832–1897), a French literary historian.

- La Chevalerie (1884). A comprehensive study of chivalry and its history, renown for its length and lavish drawings. Illustrated by Luc-Olivier Merson (1846–1920), Édouard François Zier (1856–January 1924) and Michał Elwiro Andriolli (1836–1893).
- Bibliographie des chansons de geste, 1 volume (1897). A bibliography of works related to the chanson de geste.

Jules Tessier. Jules Tessier (1836–1908), a French historian.

- Quatrième croisade: la diversion sur Zara & Constantinople (1884).

Geoffroi Jacques Flach. Geoffroi Jacques Flach (1846–1919), a French historian.

- Les origines de l'ancienne France, Xe et XIe siècles, 4 volumes (1886–1918). A history of France in the tenth and eleventh centuries.
- Chivalry (1904). Essay in Medieval Civilization: Selected Studies from European Authors, edited by American historian Dana C. Munro.

Henri de Curzon. Henri de Curzon (1861–1942), a French historian, musicologist and archivist. (cf. French Wikipedia, Henri de Curzon)

- La règle du Temple (1886). The rules of the Order of the Temple, directly inspired by those of Bernard of Clairvaux (1090–1153) that were established after the Council of Troyes (1129). Published by the Société de l'histoire de France. (cf. French Wikipedia, Règle et statuts de l'ordre du Temple).

Gabriel Mailhard de La Couure. Gabriel Mailhard de La Couture (19th century), a French writer.

- Godefroy de Bouillon et la Première Croisade.

Albert Lecoy de La Marche. Albert Lecoy de La Marche (1839–1897), a French historian.

- La Prédiction de la Croisade au Theizième Siècle (1890), in Revue des questions historiques 48 1890. Preaching a Crusade in the thirteenth century.

Émile Bouchet. Émile Bouchet (born 1848), a French historian.

- La Conquête de Constantinople, 2 volumes (1891). A translation of Geoffrey of Villehardouin's 13th century chronicle De la Conquête de Constantinople.

Élie Berger. Élie Berger (1850–1925), a French palaeographer and archivist.

- Saint Louis et Innocent IV: étude sur les rapports de France et du Saint-siège (1893).

Eugène Jarry. Eugène Jarry (1865–1940), a French paleographer and archivist.

- Le retour de la croisade de Barbarie (1390) (1893). An account of the Barbary Crusade of 1390. In Bibliothèque de l'École des Chartes, Volume 54.

Henri-François Delaborde. Henri François, comte Delaborde (1854–1927), a French historian. (cf. French Wikipedia, Henri-François Delaborde)

- Jean de Joinville et les seigneurs de Joinville, suivi d'un catalogue de leurs actes (1894).

Gaston Dodu. Gaston Dodu (1863–1939), a French historian.

- Histoire des institutions monarchiques dans le Royaume latin de Jérusalem, 1099–1291 (1894).
- De Fulconis Hierosolymitani regno (1894). A biography of Fulk of Jerusalem.

Charles Farcinet. Charles Farcinet (1824–1903), a French historian and numismatist.

- Mélanges de numismatique et d'histoire (1895). Mixtures of numismatics and history. The feudal coins of Poitou.
- Les anciens sires de Lusignan (1897). The former lords of Lusignan, Geoffroy la Grand'Dent (Geoffrey II of Lusignan) and the counts of La Marche: historical research on the Middle Ages in Poitou. Includes the Testament on Geoffrey II of Lusignan (1198–1247), by Jean Besly.

Jean-Barthélemy Hauréau. Jean-Barthélemy Hauréau (1812–1896), a French historian.

- Raimond Lulle (1895). In Histoire littéraire de la France, Tome XXIX, 1895. A biographical account of Ramon Lull.

Abbé A. Parraud. Abbé A. Parraud (fl. later nineteenth century), a French cleric.

- Vie de saint Pierre Thomas, de l'ordre des carmes, fervent serviteur de Marie, patriarche titulaire de Constantinople, légat de la croisade de 1365 (1895). A biography of saint Peter Thomas (1305–1366), a participant in the Alexandrian Crusade of 1365. In Journal général de l'imprimerie et de la librairie, Volume 84.

Marcel Schwob. Mayer André Marcel Schwob (1867–1905), a French symbolist writer.

- La Croisade des Enfants (1896). A novella about the Children's Crusade of 1212. Mixes history with fiction through the voices of eight different protagonists: a goliard, a leper, pope Innocent III, a cleric, a qalandar, pope Gregory IX and two of the marching children.

David Léon Cahun. David Léon Cahun (1841–1900), a French traveler, orientalist and writer.

- Introduction à l'histoire de l'Asie: Turcs et Mongols, des origines à 1405 (1896).

Louis Petit. Louis Petit (1868–1927), a French orientalist, founder of l'Institut d'etudes Byzantines.

- Les Confréries Musulmanes (1899). A history of Islamic dynasties.
- Sacrorum Conciliorum nova et amplissima collectio, 53 volumes (1901–1927). First published in 31 volumes (1759–1798) by Giovanni D. Mansi. Continued by L. Petit and Abbé Jean Baptiste Martin (1864–1922). Extensive edition of Church councils from the First Council of Nicaea in 325 through the Council of Florence in 1438. Includes the Canons of the Council of Clermont. and other source material relevant to the Crusades.

=== English historians and other authors ===
English, Scottish, Irish and American historians of the Crusades in the 19th century are presented below.

James Lamb. Sir James Bland Lamb, 1st Baronet (1752–1824), born James Burges, a British author, barrister and Member of Parliament.

- Richard the First: a poem in eighteen books. 2 volumes (1801).
- Dramas, 2 volumes (1817). Includes the plays The Knight of Rhodes and The Crusades.

Thomas Johnes. Thomas Johnes (1748–1816), an English politician, farmer, printer, writer and translator.

- Memoirs of the Life of Froissart (1801). A biography of Belgian historian Jean Froissart by Jean-Baptiste de La Curne de Sainte-Palaye. Edited with a complete index by T. Johnes.
- Chronicles of England, France and the Adjoining Countries, 5 volumes (1803–1810). By Jean Froissart. From the latter part of the reign of Edward II to the coronation of Henry IV. (Froissart's Chronicles). Edited by T. Johnes and Jean-Baptiste de La Curne de Sainte-Palaye.
- Memoirs of John Lord de Joinville, Grand Seneschal of Champagne, 2 volumes (1807). Edited by T. Johnes. Includes Life of Saint Louis (1309) by Jean de Joinville; Notes and Dissertations by Charles du Cange; Dissertation on Louis IX of France by Jean-Baptiste de La Curne de Sainte-Palaye; and Dissertation on the Assassins of Syria by Camille Falconet.
- The Travels of Bertrandon de La Brocq́uière to Palestine, and his return from Jerusalem overland to France, during the years 1432–1433 (1807). Translation of Bertrandon de la Broquière's Voyage d'Outremer. With a lengthy introductory discussion on travels and pilgrimage to the Holy Land, and a critique of the later Crusades.
- The Chronicles of Enguerrand de Monstrelet, 4 volumes (1809). Translated and edited by T. Johnes.
- Chronicles of the Crusades (1848), in Bohn's Libraries. Two contemporary narratives of the Crusade of Richard Coeur de Lion, by Richard of Devizes and by Geoffrey de Vinsauf; and one of the Crusade at Saint Louis, by Lord Jean de Joinville. Edited and translated by T. Johnes.

Robert Walpole. Robert Walpole (1781–1856), an English classical scholar.

- Remarks Written at Constantinople (1802).
- Memoirs Relating to European and Asiatic Turkey, 2 volumes (1817).
- Travels in Various Countries of the East, 2 volumes (1820). Edited by R. Walpole.

Henry Ellis. Sir Henry Ellis (1777–1869), an English antiquarian, once principal librarian at the British Museum.

- The New Chronicles of England and France, in two parts (1811). By Robert Fabyan. Named by himself The concordance of histories. Reprinted from Pynson's edition of 1516. The first part collated with the editions of 1533, 1542, and 1559; and the second with a manuscript of the author's own time, as well as the subsequent editions. Including the different continuations, to which are added a biographical and literary preface, and an index.
- A General Introduction to Domesday Book (1813). A description of the 1086 Domesday Book, accompanied by indexes of the tenants-in-chief, and under-tenants, at the time of the survey: as well as of the holders of lands mentioned in Domesday anterior to the formation of that record: with an abstract of the population of England at the close of the region of William the Conqueror, so far as the same is actually entered. Illustrated by numerous notes and comments.
- The Pylgrymage of Sir Richard Guylforde to the Holy Land, A.D. 1506 (1851). The travel account of Richard Guildford (c. 1450–1506), edited by H. Ellis.
- Chronica Johannis de Oxenedes (1859). An edition of the late 13th-century anonymous Chronica Johannis de Oxenedes.

John Taaffe. John Taaffe (1787–1862), an English historian and Knight Commander of the Sovereign Order of St. John of Jerusalem.

- Padilla: A tale of Palestine (1815). A fictional account of chivalry in the time of Saladin. An account of a Spaniard at Tiberias in 1187 shortly after the fall of Jerusalem.
- A Comment on the Divine comedy of Dante Alighieri (1822). Commentary on Dante's Divine Comedy.
- The History of the Holy, Military, Sovereign Order of St. John of Jerusalem: or, Knights Hospitallers, Knights Templars, Knights of Rhodes, Knights of Malta, 4 volumes (1852). Includes the account of commander Pierre d'Aubusson.
- History of the Order of Malta (1852).

Charles Mills. Charles Mills (1788–1826), an English historian.

- History of Mohammedanism (1817). A biography of the prophet of Mohammad, and an account of the caliphates and sultanates subsequently founded. Includes an inquiry into the theological, moral, and judicial codes of Islam, and their literature and sciences, with a view of the present extent and influence of Islam. French edition Histoire du Mahométisme, published in 1825.
- History of the Crusades for the Recovery and Possession of the Holy Land, 2 volumes (1820). A complete history of nine Crusades (the first eight numbered), with pre-Crusades material and commentary. Mills praises the works of Thomas Fuller and Sharon Turner, but disparages Gibbon's work as superficial. Volume 1 covers the First and Second Crusades and does not paint a good picture of the Western invaders of the Holy Land. Volume 2 covers the Third through Eighth Crusades, plus Lord Edward's Crusade and the loss of Acre.
- The travels of Theodore Ducas, 2 volumes (1822). Subtitled: In various countries in Europe at the revival of letters and art. An imaginary voyage of emperor Theodore Ducas, written in imitation of the Travels of Anacharsis. Only the first part, comprising Italy, was published
- History of Chivalry; Knighthood and its times, 2 volumes (1825).

Henry Hallam. Henry Hallam (1777–1859), an English historian.

- View of the State of Europe during the Middle Ages (1818). Historical dissertations for the fifth through fifteenth centuries for France, Italy, Spain, Germany, and the Greek and Muslim empires. Includes major institutional features of medieval society, the feudal system, the ecclesiastical system, and the political system of England. A final chapter discussed society, commerce, manners, and literature in the Middle Ages.
- L'Europe au Moyen Age, 3 volumes (1821–1822). French edition of View of the State of Europe during the Middle Ages, translated by P. Dudoit and A. R. Borghers.
- Chivalry (1869), in Gibbon's The Crusades.

Sir Walter Scott. Sir Walter Scott (1771–1832), a Scottish novelist and historian.

- Ivanhoe, 3 volumes (1820)
- Tales of the Crusaders (1825), includes the novels: The Betrothed and The Talisman.
- Count Robert of Paris (1832). A novel set in Constantinople during the buildup of the First Crusade that centers on the relationship between Crusading forces and emperor Alexius I Comnenus.
- Chivalry (1842), in Encyclopædia Britannica, 7th Edition. Volume 6, pp. 592–617.
- Essays on Chivalry and Romance, in Edward Gibbon's The Crusades, AD 1095–1261 (1869).
- Introduction to The Castle of Otranto, by English writer Horatio Walpole, describing it as the "first modern attempt to found a tale of amusing fiction upon the basis of the ancient romances of chivalry."

Thomas Love Peacock. Thomas Love Peacock (1785–1866), an English novelist, poet, and official of the East India Company.

- Maid Marian (1822). A tale of Robin Hood taking place in the twelfth century, giving satirical look at the romantic medievalism of the Young England movement and Richard the Lionheart. Edited by English scholar Richard Garnett (1835–1906) in a later edition.
- Crotchet Castle (1831, 1837). A novel where the protagonist is diverted from his interest in the Third Crusade by a love interest.

Eleanor Anne Porden. Eleanor Anne Porden (1795–1825), a British Romantic poet.

- Cœur de Lion, or The Third Crusade. A poem, in sixteen books, 2 volumes (1822). A story of the captivity of Richard and the loss of chivalry.

George Procter. Major George Procter (1795–1842), an English historian.

- The lucubrations [meditations] of Humphrey Ravelin (1823). Late major in the * * regiment of infantry.
- The history of Italy (1844). From the fall of the Western empire to the commencement of the wars of the French revolution.
- History of the Crusades (1854). Comprising the rise, progress and results of the various extraordinary European expeditions for the recovery of the Holy Land from the Saracens and Turks. A discussion of the causes of the wars and the numbered eight Crusades, with commentary on consequences; and 150 original illustrations.

Henry Stebbings. Henry Stebbings (1799–1883), an English historian and editor.

- History of Chivalry and the Crusades, 2 volumes (1829–1830). Volumes 50–51 of Constable's Miscellany, 80 volumes (1826–1834). A discussion of chivalry and history of the first seven Crusades. Volume 2 begins with the death of Godfrey of Bouillon.
- The Surprising Adventures of Robinson Crusoe (1838). An edition of Robinson Crusoe, with 22 plates and a life of the author Daniel Defoe.
- The Christian in Palestine, or Scenes of Sacred History (1847). Subtitled, to illustrate sketches taken on the spot by English artist William Henry Bartlett (1809–1854).

G. P. R. James. George Payne Rainsford James (1799–1860), an English novelist and historical writer, holding the honorary office of British Historiographer Royal.

- The History of Chivalry (1830). An account of the Crusades, beginning with the rise of chivalry. Includes: the first three Crusades, with vivid descriptions of the major battles; the death of Saladin; the later Crusades and the loss of Acre; the decline of the military orders.
- The History of Charlemagne (1833).
- A History of the Life of Richard Coeur-de-Lion, King of England (1842).

Samuel Bentley. Samuel Bentley (1785–1868), an English printer and antiquarian.

- Poem describing the Assault of Massoura (1831). By an anonymous Englishman in Excerpta historica (1831), translated by S. Bentley. The assault of Massoura was fought in February 1250 between the Crusader forces of Louis IX of France and the Ayyubid forces of Shajar al-Durr and Baibars.

Ellis Cornelia Knight. Ellis Cornelia Knight (1757–1837), an English gentlewoman, traveler and writer.

- Sir Guy de Lusignan: a Tale of Italy, 2 volumes (1833). A fictional account of Lord Edward's Crusade of 1271–1272 and the assassination attempt on Edward's life.

Thomas Keightley. Thomas Keightley (1789–1872), an Irish writer known for his works on mythology and folklore.

- The Crusaders: or, Scenes, Events, and Characters, from the times of the Crusades, 2 volumes (1834).

Nicholas Harris Nicolas. Nicholas Harris Nicolas (1799–1848), an English antiquary.

- The chronology of history (1833). Containing tables, calculations and statements for ascertaining the dates of historical events, and of public and private documents, from the earliest period to the present time.

James Mackintosh. Sir James Mackintosh (1765–1832) was a Scottish jurist, politician and historian.

- The history of England (1836). Includes the history of the Crusades.

Thomas Duffus Hardy. Sir Thomas Duffus Hardy (1804–1878), an English archivist and antiquary.

- Gesta Regum Anglorum, 2 volumes (1840). An edition of Gesta Regum Anglorum (Deeds of the Kings of the English) by English historian William of Malmesbury (1095–1143). Includes an account of the White Ship disaster of 1120 which claimed the lives of over 140 knights and noblemen, including First Crusader Ralph the Red of Pont-Echanfray.
- Rerum britannicarum medii aevi scriptores (Rolls Series), 253 volumes 1858–1911. Begun by Hardy and British archivists John Romilly (1802–1874), Joseph Stevenson (1806–1895). A collection of British and Irish medieval chronicles, archival records, legal tracts, folklore and hagiographical materials.

Richard Barham. Richard Harris Barham (pseudonym Thomas Ingoldsby) (1788–1845), an English cleric, a novelist and a humorous poet.

- The Ingoldsby Legends, 2 volumes (1840–1847). A collection of myths, legends, ghost stories and poetry. Several of the entries deal with the Crusades, including: A Lay of St Nicholas; The Lord of Thoulouse: a legend of Languedoc; and The Lay of the Old Woman Clothed in Grey: a legend of Dover.

John Charles Conybeare. John Charles Conybeare (fl 1840), an English barrister and poet.

- Richard the First in Palestine (1840). A poem which obtained the Chancellor's medal at the Cambridge commencement, 1840

John Allen Giles. John Allen Giles (1808–1884), an English historian and scholar of Anglo-Saxon language and history. Among his works were the revisions of Stevens' translation of the Anglo-Saxon Chronicle and Bede's Ecclesiastical History of the English People.

- The chronicle of Richard of Devizes: concerning the deeds of Richard the First, King of England. Also, Richard of Cirencester's Description of Britain. (1841).
- Roger of Wendover's Flowers of history: Comprising the history of England from the descent of the Saxons to A.D. 1235; formerly ascribed to Matthew Paris (1849).
- Chronicles of the crusades (1882). Contemporary narratives of the crusade of Richard Coeur de Lion.

John Breakenridge. John Breakenridge (1820–1854), an English poet.

- The Crusades, and other Poems (1846). A collection of poems about the events of the Crusades, biblical events and other topics. With an interesting commentary on sources for the Crusader poems.

Henry George Bohn. Henry George Bohn (1796–1884), a British publisher.

- Bohn's Libraries (1846–1884). Editions of standard works and translations, dealing with history, science, classics, theology and archaeology.
- Chronicles of the Crusades (1848), in Bohn's Libraries. Two contemporary narratives of the Crusade of Richard Coeur de Lion and one of the Crusade at Saint Louis. Edited and translated by Thomas Johnes.
- The Ecclesiastical History of England and Normandy (1853–1856), in Bohn's Libraries. Translation of work by Orderic Vitalis, with introduction by François Guizot and critical notice by Léopold V. Delisle.

Benjamin Disraeli. Benjamin Disraeli, 1st Earl of Beaconsfield (1804–1881), a British politician and prime minister of the United Kingdom from 1874 to 1880.

- Tancred, or the New Crusade (1847). A novel about an idealistic young noble, Tancred, who leave his parents and retraces his ancestors to the Holy Land. Edition of 1904 edited by Bernard N. Langdon-Davies. Discussed in Elizabeth Siberry's Images of the Crusades.

John Mason Neale. John Mason Neale (1818–1866), an English Anglican priest, scholar and hymnwriter.

- Stories of the Crusades: I. De Hellingley. II. The Crusade of S. Louis (1848). The first part concerns a knight Sir Rainald de Hellingley in the time of Baldwin IV of Jerusalem. The second part, Lord Edward's Crusade.
- Mediæval hymns and sequences (1863). Includes Jerusalem the golden by Bernard of Cluny (12th century).

John Kitto. John Kitto (1804–1854), an English Biblical scholar.

- The History of Palestine (1850). From the patriarchal age to the present time with introductory chapters on the geography and natural history of the country, and on the customs and institutions of the Hebrews. Used as a source for Bibliographia Geographica Palestinæ by Titus Tobler.

Henry Thomas Riley. Henry Thomas Riley (1816–1878), an English translator, lexicographer and antiquary.

- The annals of Roger de Hoveden (1853). Comprising the history of England and of other countries of Europe from A.D. 732 to A.D. 1201. A translation by H. Riley from the Latin of Chronica magistri Rogeri de Hoveden by Roger of Howden (fl. 1174–1201), an English chronicler who accompanied Richard I of England on the Third Crusade.

William Robson. William Robson (1785–1863), a British author and translator.

- The Great Sieges of History (1855). A study of sieges, including Crusader sieges of Acre, Antioch, Edessa and Jerusalem. Illustrated by John Gilbert (1817–1897).
- History of France, from the invasion of the Franks under Clovis, to the accession of Louis Philippe (1856)/
- The History of the Crusades, 3 volumes (1852). A translation of Histoire des Croisades by Joseph François Michaud.
- Three Musketeers, 2 volumes (1853). Translation of the classic work of Alexander Dumas. With a letter from Alexander Dumas fils. With 150 illustrations by Maurice Leloir (1853–1940).
- History of the Crusades, 2 volumes (1875). An edition of Michaud's Histoire des Croisades, translated by Robson, and illustrated by Gustave Doré (1832–1863) with 100 grand compositions.

Henry Hart Milman. Henry Hart Milman (1791–1868), an English historian and ecclesiastic.

- History of Latin Christianity, 9 volumes (1855). Including that of the Popes to the pontificate of Nicolas V.
- Edward Gibbon's History of the Decline and Fall of the Roman Empire, 6 volumes (1871). A new edition, edited and with notes by H. Milman.

William Bernard McCabe. William Bernard McCabe (1801–1891), an Irish author of historical romances.

- Florine, Princess of Burgundy: A Tale of the First Crusaders (1855). A historical novel of French Crusader Florine of Burgundy (1083–1097), the wife of Sweyn the Crusader.

Thomas Wright. Thomas Wright (1810–1877), an English antiquarian and writer.

- Early Christianity in Arabia: a historical essay (1855).
- The History of France: from the earliest period to the present time, 3 volumes (1856–1862). Volume 1 discusses the Crusades.

Celestia Angenette Bloss. Celestia Angenette Bloss (1812–1855), an American teacher and historian.

- Heroines of the Crusades (1857). A stylized history of women important to the Crusades including Adela of Blois, Eleanor of Aquitaine, Berengaria of Navarre, Isabella of Angoulême, Isabella II (Violante) of Jerusalem, and Eleanor of Castile.

John George Edgar. John George Edgar (1834–1864), an English writer of miscellany.

- The Crusades and the Crusaders (1860). A student-level romanticized version of the Crusades through the loss of Acre in 1291.

Thomas Henry Dyer. Thomas Henry Dyer (1804–1888) was an English historical and antiquarian writer.

- The History of Modern Europe, from the Fall of Constantinople in 1453, to the Crimean War, in 1857 (1861–1864).

Arthur Penrhyn Stanley. Arthur Penrhyn Stanley (1815–1881), an English Anglican priest and ecclesiastical historian. Stanley was a co-founder of the Palestine Exploration Fund.

- Sinai and Palestine: in connection with their history (1863).
- The Recovery of Jerusalem: A narrative of exploration and discovery in the city and the Holy Land (1871). With Richard Phené Spiers, Melchior Vogüé, Charles W. Wilson, Charles Warren and others.

Charlotte Elizabeth Tonna. Charlotte Elizabeth Tonna (1790–1846), a popular Victorian English writer and novelist who wrote under the pseudonym Charlotte Elizabeth.

- War with the saints: Count Raymond of Toulouse, and the crusade against the Albigenses under Pope Innocent III (1864). An account of the Albigensian Crusade and the roles of Raymond VI of Toulouse and Innocent III in the conflict.

William Stubbs. William Stubbs (1825–1901), an English historian and Anglican bishop.

- Chronicles and memorials of the reign of Richard I, 2 volumes (1864–1865). Edited by W. Stubbs.
- The Medieval Kingdoms of Cyprus and Armenia (1878). Two lectures delivered Oct. 26 and 29, 1878. In the Talbot collection of British pamphlets.

Charlotte Mary Yonge. Charlotte Mary Yonge (1823–1901), an English novelist.

- The Prince and the Page: A Story of the Last Crusade (1866). A fictional account of Lord Edward's Crusade of 1271–1272 and two assassination attempts on Edward's life (the second of which is foiled by his page).

George Henry Townsend. George Henry Townsend (1787–1869), an English literary compiler and journalist.

- A Manual of Dates. (1867). A dictionary of reference to the most important events in the history of mankind to be found in authentic records.

Barbara Hutton. Barbara Hutton (fl. 1863–1892), an English author of juvenile works and biographies.

- Heroes of the Crusades (1869). A stylized history of heroes of the First through Third Crusades, from Peter the Hermit to Richard the Lionheart.

William Makepeace Thackeray. William Makepeace Thackeray (1811–1863), an English novelist.

- Burlesques (1869). In the story Barbazure, a character relates his time in the Crusades, improbably claiming to have been with Richard I of England at Ascalon, Louis IX of France at Damietta, and Suleiman at Rhodes.

George Zabriskie Gray. George Zabriskie Gray (1837–1889), an American clergyman and author.

- The Children's Crusade: an episode of the thirteenth century (1872).

William Muir. Sir William Muir (1819–1905), a Scottish orientalist.

- The Life of Mahomet: from original sources (1877).
- Annals of the Early Caliphate: from original sources (1883).
- The Caliphate: its rise, decline, and fall (1891).
- The Mameluke, or, Slave dynasty of Egypt (1896).

Frederick Charles Woodhouse. Frederick Charles Woodhouse (1827–1905), an English historian.

- The Military Religious Orders of the Middle Ages (1879). The Hospitallers, the Templars, the Teutonic Knights, and others. With an appendix of other orders of knighthood: legendary, honorary, and modern.

Edwin Pears. Sir Edwin Pears (1835–1919), a British barrister, author and historian.

- The Fall of Constantinople: Being the Story of the Fourth Crusade (1885).
- The Destruction of the Greek Empire and the Story of the Capture of Constantinople by the Turks (1903).

Jacob Isadore Mombert. Jacob Isadore Mombert (1829–1913), an American historian.

- Great Lives: A Course of History in Biographies (1886). Biographies from ancient to modern times, including one of Godfrey of Bouillon.
- A History of Charles the Great (Charlemagne) (1888).
- A Short History of the Crusades (1894). A history of the Crusades from the First to the Eighth, continuing to 1312. Includes a detailed section on pilgrimage, particularly Helena's discovery of the True Cross. In addition, it discusses the Albigensian Crusade of 1209–1229.

Alfred Hayes. Alfred Hayes (1857–1936), an English poet and translator.

- The Last Crusade, and other Poems (1887). A work concerning the Eighth Crusade of 1270.

Henry Charles Lea. Henry Charles Lea (1825–1909), an American historian, specializing on church history of the Middle Ages.

- A History of the Inquisition of the Middle Ages, 3 volumes (1888). Volume 3, Chapter III discusses the Crusades.
- A History of Auricular Confession and Indulgences in the Latin Church, 3 volumes (1896).

Thomas Andrew Archer. Thomas Andrew Archer (1853–1905), an English historian of the Crusades.

- The Crusade of Richard I, 1189–1192 (1889). A history of the Third Crusade from 1189–1192, in particular, the role of Richard I of England, with English historian Charles L. Kingsford. A detailed chronology with excerpts from Itinerarium Regis Ricardi and works by Ambroise of Normandy (fl. 1190), Roger of Howden (fl. 1174–1201), Ralph of Coggeshall (died after 1227), Ralph de Diceto (1120–1202), Roger of Wendover (died 1236), Matthew Paris (1200–1259), ibn al-Athir (1160–1233) and Bar Hebraeus (1226–1286). With interesting appendices on such diverse subjects as coinage, medieval warfare, the Assassins and the Old Man in the Mountain, beards, Arabic speaking among Crusaders, beheading of the dead. Illustrations of various war engines of the time.
- The Crusades: The Story of the Latin Kingdom of Jerusalem (1904). A history of the Crusades and the kingdom of Jerusalem from the fourth century through the First Crusade, ending with the fall of Acre in 1291. Additional material on the post-Crusade era and commentary are provided. With C. Kingsford and British author Henry E. Watts.

Charles Lethbridge Kingsford. Charles Lethbridge Kingsford (1862–1926), an English historian and author.

- The Crusade of Richard I, 1189–1192 (1889). A history of the Third Crusade, in particular, the role of Richard I of England, with English historian Thomas A. Archer.
- The Crusades: The Story of the Latin Kingdom of Jerusalem (1904). With T. Archer and British author Henry E. Watts.

C. R. Conder. Claude Reignier Conder (1848–1910), an English soldier, explorer and antiquarian. Member of the Palestine Exploration Fund.

- Mediæval Topography of Palestine (1875). In Palestine Exploration Quarterly (1875–1876).
- The Survey of Western Palestine (1881). With British officer Herbert Kitchener (1850–1916). Arabic and English name lists collected during the survey.
- The Survey of Eastern Palestine (1889). Memoirs of the topography, orography, hydrography and archaeology.
- The Latin Kingdom of Jerusalem (1897). A history of the kingdom from Peter the Hermit through the fall of Acre in 1291. With a list of authorities.
- The Life of Saladin (1897). Translation of biography of Saladin by Baha ad-Din ibn Shaddad (1145–1234).

Claude Delaval Cobham. Claude Delaval Cobham (1842–1915), a British colonial official and historian.

- An Attempt at a Bibliography of Cyprus (1886). Original edition had 157 entries. Third edition (1894) shows 497 with new sections of cartography and consular reports.
- The Sieges of Nicosia and Famagusta in Cyprus (1903). Translation of an Italian work on the Ottoman-Venetian war of 1500–1503, originally by historian Uberto Foglietta.
- Excerpta cypria (1908). Materials for a history of Cyprus. With an appendix on the bibliography of Cyprus.
- Travels in the Island of Cyprus (1909). English translation of the Italian work by Giovanni Filippo Mariti.
- The Patriarchs of Constantinople (1911). Chronology of the patriarchs of Constantinople from A.D. 35 through 1884. With the reverends H. T. F. Duckworth (1868–1927) and Adrian Fortescue (1874–1923).

Alfred Trumble. Alfred Trumble, a British historian.

- Sword and scimetar: the romance of the crusades (1886). The story of four centuries of Christian warfare, retold from the old chronicles.

Guy Le Strange. Guy Le Strange (1854–1933), a British orientalist specializing in historical geography of the Middle East and the editing of Persian geographical texts.

- Palestine under the Moslems: A description of Syria and the Holy Land from A. D. 650 to 1500 (1890).
- Baghdad during the Abbasid caliphate from contemporary Arabic and Persian sources (1900).
- The Lands of the Eastern Caliphate: Mesopotamia, Persia, and Central Asia from the Moslem conquest to the time of Timur (1905).

George William Cox. George William Cox (1827–1902), a British theologian and historian.

- The Crusades (1891). Part of the Epochs of Modern History series. A history of the Holy Land from the capture of Jerusalem by Khosrow II in 611 through the First through Ninth Crusades, arranged chronologically. Includes a section on chivalry.

Stanley Lane-Poole. Stanley Edward Lane-Poole (1854–1931), a British orientalist and archaeologist.

- The Barbary Corsairs (1890). Includes an account of the Spanish Crusade to Mahdia of 1550.
- The Mohammedan Dynasties: Chronological and Genealogical Tables with Historical Introductions (1894). Includes the dynasties of Egypt, the Levant, Persia, Afghanistan and the Mongols.
- Saladin and the Fall of the Kingdom of Jerusalem (1898).
- History of Egypt in the Middle Ages (1901).
- Personal Narrative of a Pilgrimage to Al Madinah and Meccah, 3 volumes (1913). Introduction to the work by British explorer Richard Francis Burton (1821–1890), edited by Lady Isabel Burton (1831–1896).

Henry Edward Watts. Henry Edward Watts (1826–1904), a British journalist and author on Spanish topics.

- The Story of the Crusades: the Christian Recovery of Spain (1895). A history from the Moorish conquest until the fall of Granada, 711–1492. The second part of a new edition of Thomas A. Archer and Charles L. Kingsford's The Story of the Latin Kingdom of Jerusalem.
- The Ingenious Gentleman Don Quixote of La Mancha (1895). A new translation of Don Quixote by Miguel de Cervantes, with notes, original and selected.

J. Dunbar Hylton. J. Dunbar Hylton (1837–1893), an American author.

- The Sea-King. A tale of the Crusade under Richard the First of England, in seven parts (1895). An imaginative approach to the Third Crusade featuring sea nymphs and other marine exotica.

Ephraim Emerton. Ephraim Emerton (1851–1935), an American author, translator and medieval European historian.

- Mediaeval Europe: (814-1300) (1895). The First through Sixth Crusades are discussed in Chapter XI: The Crusades, pp. 357–397, with bibliography.

Hilaire Belloc. Hilaire Belloc (1870–1953), a British-French writer and historian.

- Syllabus of a course of six lectures of the Crusades (1896).
- The Crusades: the World's Debate (1937).

James M. Ludlow. James Meeker Ludlow (1841–1932), an English historian and novelist.

- The Age of the Crusades (1896). An account of the First Crusade through the fall of Acre in 1291, plus material on chivalry and the feudal system. Includes an extensive bibliography. Volume VI of Ten Epochs of Church History (1896), edited by John Fulton.

John Fulton. John Fulton (1834–1907), an English traveler, archivist and historian.

- Ten Epochs of Church History, 10 volumes (1896–1900). Volumes include: I. The Apostolic Age: Its Life, Doctrine, Worship and Polity; II. The Post-Apostolic Age; III. The Ecumenical Councils; IV. The Age of Charlemagne; V. The Age of Hildebrand; VI. The Age of the Crusades; VII. The Age of Renascence (1377–1527); VIII. The Age of the Great Western Schism; IX. The Reformation; and X. The Anglican Reformation.
- Palestine: the Holy Land as it was and as it is (1900).

Marvin Vincent. Marvin R. Vincent (1834–1922), an American theologian and author.

- The Age of Hildebrand (1896). The church and papacy from Leo IX (1049–1054) through Innocent III (1198–1216). Accounts of the First through Fourth Crusades, Albigensian Crusade. Volume V of Ten Epochs of Church History (1896), edited by John Fulton.

Richard Davey. Richard Davey (1848–1911), an English author and journalist.

- The Sultan and His Subjects, 2 volumes (1897). A fictional account of the sultans of the Ottoman empire, with an extensive bibliography as sources and an explicit criticism of Islam.

William Foster. Sir William Foster (1863–1951), a British historiographer and member of the Hakluyt Society.

- Embassy of Sir Thomas Roe to the Court of the Great Mogul, 1615–1619, as narrated in his journal and correspondence (1898). By English historian and diplomat Thomas Roe. Edited with an introduction by W. Foster for the Hakluyt Society.
- Travels in Persia, 1627–1629 (1928). By English historian and explorer Thomas Herbert (1606–1682). Abridged and edited by W. Foster.

Israel Smith Clare. Israel Smith Clare (1847–1924), an American historian.

- Library of Universal History, 12 volumes (1898). A universal world history from ancient Egypt to the Spanish-American War of 1898. Volume 5 considers the rise of Islam and the Fatimid, Seljuk and Ghaznavid dynasties; chivalry; the First Crusade; the Second and Third Crusade; the last four Crusades; the military orders; and the Albigensian Crusade. Volume 6 considers the fall of Constantinople and subsequent Latin Empire; the Mongol conquests; and the rise of the Ottoman empire.

Charles Oman. Sir Charles William Chadwick Oman (1860–1946), a British military historian.

- A history of the art of war in the middle ages, 2 volumes (1898). Includes in Volume I: The Byzantines, A.D. 579–1204; The Crusades, A.D. 1097–1291; in Volume II: Arms, fortifications and siegecraft, 1100–1300; The longbow in England and France; Gunpowder and cannon; the Swiss; Eastern Europe and the Near East (1230–1500).

=== German historians and other authors ===
German historians of the Crusades from the 19th century included the following.

August von Kotzebue. August Friedrich Ferdinand von Kotzebue (1761–1819), a German dramatist and writer.

- Die Kreuzfahrer (1803). A play about the First Crusade. Published in London as Alfred and Emma (1806).

Frederich Wilken. Friederich Wilken (1777–1840), a German orientalist. Referred to as the first professional historian to capture the Crusades in book form, pioneering the use of Eastern sources. (cf. German Wikipedia, Frederich Wilken)

- Geschichte der Kreuzzüge nach morgenländischen und abendländischehn Berichten, 7 volumes (1807–1832). A complete history of the Crusades, based on Western, Arabic, Greek and Armenian sources.
- History of the Crusades, English translation of Geschichte der Kreuzzüge.

Arnold Hermann Ludwig Heeren. Arnold Hermann Ludwig Heeren (1760–1842) a German historian.

- Essai sur l'influence des croisades (1808). An essay to examine the influence of the Crusades on the civil liberty of the peoples of Europe, on their civilization, on the progress of trade and industry. Translated by French philosopher Charles F. de Villers (1765–1815).

Joseph von Hammer-Purgstall. Joseph von Hammer-Purgstall (1774–1856), an Austrian orientalist and historian.

- Der Diwan des Mohammed Schemsed-Din Hafis (1812–1813). First complete translation of the Divān of Persian poet Ḥāfeẓ (1315–1390) into a Western language.
- Die Geschichte der Assassinen aus morgenländischen Quellen (1818). A history of the Assassins from oriental sources. French translation: Histoire de l'ordre des assassins à l'origine de l'État islamique.
- Geschichte des osmanischen Reiches, 10 volumes (1827–1835). A history of the Ottoman empire.
- New Arabian Nights Entertainment, 3 volumes (1827), translated by British politician and writer George Lamb (1784–1834).
- Narrative of travels in Europe, Asia, and Africa in the seventeenth century (1834). English language translation of the first two volumes of Evliya Çelebi's travelogue Seyahatname, 10 volumes (1611–1682). Printed for the Oriental translation fund of Great Britain and Ireland.
- The History of the Assassins (1835). An English language translation of Die Geschichte der Assassinen aus morgenländischen Quellen by Oswood C. Wood.
- Geschichte der Goldenen Horde in Kiptschak (1840). A history of the Golden Horde in Russia (Kipchak) around 1200–1500: with detailed references, a descriptive overview of the four hundred sources, nine enclosures containing documents and extracts, and a name and subject index.

Friedrich Heinrich Karl de la Motte. Friedrich Heinrich Karl de la Motte, Baron Fouqué (1777–1843), a German writer of the Romantic style.

- Der Zauberring, 3 volumes (1812). The Magic Ring, set during the Third Crusade.

Georg Heinrich Pertz. Georg Heinrich Pertz (1795–1876), a German historian.

- Monumenta Germaniae Historica (MGH) (1826). Edited first by G. H. Pertz and then by German historians Georg Waitz (1813–1886), Theodor Mommsen (1817–1903) and others. Comprehensive set of chronicle and archival sources for German history from the end of the Roman Empire until 1500.

Josef Dobrovský. Josef Dobrovský (1753–1829), a Czech philologist and historian.

- Historia de expeditione Friderici Imperatoris (1827). An edition of Historia de expeditione Friderici imperatoris (History of the Expedition of the Emperor Frederick), or Espeditio Friderici Imperatoris, providing a history of the Third Crusade from 1189–1192 with an emphasis on the expedition of Frederick I Barbarossa.

Barthold Georg Niebuhr. Barthold Georg Niebuhr (1776–1831), a Danish–German statesman and historian who was a founder of modern historiography.

- Corpus Scriptorum Historæ Byzantinæ (CSHB), 50 volumes (1828–1897). Also known as the Bonn Corpus. Originally edited by Jesuit historian and geographer Philippe Labbe in 1648, updated by Niebuhr. Primary sources from 330–1453 for the history of the Byzantine empire.

Leopold von Ranke. Leopold von Ranke (1795–1886), a German historian and a founder of modern source-based history.

- Das Zeitalter der Kreuzzüge und das späte Mittelalter. The Age of the Crusades and the Middle Ages.
- Heinrich IV, König von Frankreich. A biography of Henry IV, Holy Roman Emperor.
- The History of the Popes during the Last Four Centuries (1834). A history of the popes from the sixteenth century through the late nineteenth century, with an overview of the papacy prior to 1500, and detailed biographies from Leo X (1513–1521) to Sixtus V (1585–1590).
- Weltgeschichte, 9 volumes (1881–1888). World history, particularly Volume 8: The Crusades and Papal World Domination. Covers the First through Fourth Crusades, the Mongol conquests and the Teutonic Order in Prussia.

Heinrich Ferdinand Wüstenfeld. Heinrich Ferdinand Wüstenfeld (1808–1899), a German orientalist, known as a literary historian of Arabic literature.

- Vitae illustrium virorum (1837). Translation into Latin of the sources of Wafayat al-ayan wa-anba al-zaman (Deaths of Eminent Men and the Sons of the Epoch) used by Arab scholar ibn Khallikan (1211–1282).
- Abhandlung über die in Aegypten eingewanderten arabischen stämme (1847). Translation of Al-Mawā'iẓ wa-al-I'tibār bi-Dhikr al-Khiṭaṭ wa-al-āthār by Egyptian historian al-Makrizi.
- Kitāb' 'Ajāʾib al-makhlūqāt wa-gharāʾib al-mawjūdāt (1848–1849). Edition of ʿAjā'ib al-makhlūqāt wa gharā'ib al-mawjūdāt (Marvels of creatures and Strange things existing), an Arabic work on cosmography by Persian polymath Zakariya al-Qazwini (1203–1283).

Karl Georg von Raumer. Karl Georg von Raumer (1783–1865), a German geologist.

- Palästina (1838). A description of the geography and geology of Palestine.
- Kreuzzüge, 2 volumes (1840–1864). A history of the Crusades.

Friedrich Emmanuel von Hurter. Friedrich Emmanuel von Hurter (1787–1865), a Swiss historian.

- Histoire du pape Innocent III et de ses contemporains, 2 volumes (1839).

Heinrich von Sybel. Heinrich von Sybel (1817–1895), a German historian who studied under Leopold von Ranke. Sybel and Ranke challenged the work of William of Tyre as being secondary.

- Ueber das königreich Jerusalem, 1100–1131 (1840). A history of the kingdom of Jerusalem under Baldwin I of Jerusalem and Baldwin II of Jerusalem.
- Geschichte des ersten Kreuzzuges (1841, updated 1881). A history of the First Crusade and contains a full study of the authorities for the First Crusade.
- History and Literature of the Crusades, 1 volume (1861). A history and bibliography of the Crusades through the Third Crusade, translated by English author Lucie, Lady Duff-Gordon (1821–1869).

Joseph Derenbourg. Joseph Derenbourg (1811–1895) was a Franco-German orientalist.

- Les séances de Hariri, publiées en arabe avec un commentaire choisi by Ḥarīrī, 2nd edition (1847). Translation of the work of Arab poet al-Harīrī (1030–1122). Original translation by French orientalist Antoine Isaac Silvestre de Sacy (1758–1838). Second edition edited with French orientalist Joseph Toussaint Reinaud.
- Essai sur l'histoire et la géographie de la Palestine (1867). An original contribution to the history of the Jews and Judaism in the time of Christ.
- Oeuvres complètes de r. Saadia ben Iosef al-Fayyoûmî, 9 volumes (1893). The complete works of Gaon and Jewish philosopher Saadia ben Joseph Al-Fayyumi (892–942). With his son, French orientalist Hartwig Derenbourg (1844–1908).

Gottlieb L. Tafel. Gottlieb Lukas Friedrich Tafel (1757–1860), a German classical philologist and a pioneer of Byzantine studies in Europe. (cf. German Wikipedia, Gottlieb Lukas Friedrich Tafel)

- Urkunden zur älteren Handels- und Staatsgeschichte der Republik Venedig, mit besonderer Beziehung auf Byzanz und die Levante, 3 volumes (1856–1857). Documents on the earlier commercial and state history of the Republic of Venice, with special reference to Byzantium and the Levant. From the 9th to the end of the 15th century. With German historian Georg Martin Thomas.

Georg Martin Thomas. Georg Martin Thomas (1817–1887), a German philologist and historian. (cf. German Wikipedia, Georg Martin Thomas)

- Urkunden zur älteren Handels- und Staatsgeschichte der Republik Venedig, mit besonderer Beziehung auf Byzanz und die Levante, 3 volumes (1856–1857). Documents on the earlier commercial and state history of the Republic of Venice, with special reference to Byzantium and the Levant. From the 9th to the end of the 15th century. With German historian Gottlieb Lukas Friedrich Tafel.
- Diplomatarium veneto-levantinum sive Acta et diplomata res Venetas, Graecas atque Levantis illustrantia, 1300–1454, 2 volumes (1880–1899). With Italian archivist Riccardo Predelli (1840–1909).

Wilhelm Wattenbach. Wilhelm Wattenbach (1819–1897), a German historian.

- Deutschlands Geschichtsquellen im mittelalter bis zur mitte des dreizehnten jahrhunderts, 2 volumes (1858). Germany's historical sources from the Middle Ages to the middle of the thirteenth century. Later edition of Volume 1 edited by German paleographer Ludwig Traube (1861–1907) and German historian Ernst Dümmler (1830–1902).

August Potthast. August Potthast (1824–1898), a German historian.

- Bibliotheca Historica Medii Aevi, 2 volumes (1862). Guide through the historical works of the European Middle Ages up to 1500. Complete table of contents for 'Acta sanctorum' Boll – Bouquet – Migne – Monum. Germ. hist .-- Muratori – Rerum Britann. scriptores etc.; Appendix: Source studies for the history of European states during the Middle Ages.
- Regesta Pontificum Romanorum inde ab a. post Christum natum MCXCVIII ad a. MCCCIV, 2 volumes (1874–1875). Works of the popes from 1198–1304, edited by A. Potthast.

Joseph Müller. Joseph Müller (1825–1895), a German philologist. (cf. German Wikipedia, Joseph Müller)

- Acta et diplomata graeca medii aevi sacra et profana, 6 volumes (1862–1890). With Slovene philologist Franz Miklosich (1813–1891).

Bernhard von Kugler. Bernhard von Kugler (1837–1898), a German historian.

- Boemund und Tankred, Fürsten von Antiochien: ein Beitrag zur Geschichte der Normannen in Syrien (1862).
- Studien zur Geschichte des Zweiten Kreuzzuges (1866). Studies on the history of the Second Crusade.
- Geschichte der Kreuzzüge (1880). A history of the Crusades. Reprinted in Allgemeine Geschichte in Einzeldarstellungen.
- Albert von Aachen (1885). A commentary on Albert of Aachen and his major work Historia Hierosolymitanae expeditionis.

Karl Hopf. Karl Hopf (1832–1873), a German historian, specializing in medieval Greece, both Byzantine and Frankish.

- Geschichte Griechenlands vom Beginn des Mittelalters bis auf unsere Zeit, 2 volumes (1876). History of Greece from the beginning of the Middle Ages to our time. Originally printed in the Ersch-Gruber Encyclopädie, Volumes 85–86.

Carl Hermann Ethé. Carl Hermann Ethé (1844–1917), a German orientalist who specialized in catalogues of Islamic manuscripts and German translations of Persian poetry.

- Kazwînis Kosmographie: Die Wunder der Schöpfung (1868). German translation of ʿAjā'ib al-makhlūqāt wa gharā'ib al-mawjūdāt (Marvels of creatures and Strange things existing), an Arabic work on cosmography by Persian polymath Zakariya al-Qazwini (1203–1283). Based on the 1848 edition by German orientalist Heinrich F. Wüstenfeld.
- Catalogue of Persian Manuscripts in the Library of the India Office, 42 volumes (1903).
- Articles for the Encyclopædia Britannica, 11th Edition (1911).

Tabulae Ordinis Teutonici. Tabulae Ordinis Teutonici (1869) is a collection of original documents related to the Teutonic Order. Edited by German archivist Ernst Strehlke (1834–1869), completed posthumously by German historian Philipp Jaffé. (cf. German Wikipedia, Ernst Strehlke)

Karl Fischer. Karl Fischer (1840–1933), a German historian and social scientist.

- Geschichte des Kreuzzüges Kaiser Friedrich's I (1870).

Augustin Theiner. Augustin Theiner (1804–1874), a German theologian and historian. Prefect of the Vatican secret archives.

- Monumenta spectantia ad unionem ecclesiarum Graecae et Romanae (1872). With Slovene philologist Franz Miklosich (1813–1891).

Reinhold Röhricht. Reinhold Röhricht (1842–1905), a German historian of the Crusades, regarded as a pioneer with fellow German historian Heinrich Hagenmeyer (1834–1915) in the history of the kingdom of Jerusalem, laying the foundation for modern Crusader research.

- Die Kreuzfahrt Kaiser Friedrich des Zweiten (1228–1229) (1872)
- Beiträge zur Geschichte der Kreuzzüg, 2 volumes (1874–1888). Contributions to the history of the Crusades. Includes three parts: (1) Die Kreuzfahrt des Kaisers Friedrich II (Crusade of Frederick II, 1228–1229); Die Kämpfe Saladins mit den Christen in den Jahren 1187 und 1188 (Saladin's battles with the Christians in 1187 and 1188); and Auszüge aus dem Werke Kamål ad-Dins: Die Sahne der Geschichte Halebs (Excerpts from Kamal al-Din's history of Aleppo, Bughyat al-ṭalab fī tārīkh Ḥalab).
- Der Kinderkreuzzug von 1212 (1876), in Historische Zeitschrift, Bd. 36, H.1, 1876. An account of the Children's Crusade of 1212.
- Quinti Belli sacri scriptores minores (1879). Six minor works edited by Röhricht, primarily concerning the Fifth Crusade. Continued by the author's Testimonia minora de quinto bello sacro. Also referred to as Scriptores Minores Quinti Belli sacri.
- Études sur les derniers temps du royaume de Jérusalem (1881, 1884). Studies on the latter days of the kingdom of Jerusalem. La croisade du prince Édouard d'Angleterre (1270–1274) and Les batailles de Hims (1281 du 1289) in Archives de l'Orient Latin (AOL), Tome 1. Les combats du sultan Bibars contre les Chêtiens en Syrie (1261–1277) in AOL Tome 2.
- Testimonia minora de quinto bello sacro (1882). A continuation of Quinti Belli sacri scriptores minores, providing some 233 lesser-known excerpts of contemporaneous authors concerning the Fifth Crusade. Volume 2 of Société de l'Orient Latin, Série historique.
- An edition of the Annales de Terre Sainte, 1095–1291 (1884). With French historian and philologist Gaston Raynaud. The Annales de Terre Sainte was first composed in Old French and refers to a series of brief chronological entries that recount the history of the Crusades and the Latin East from 1095–1291. The Annales tradition proved popular enough that it was copied into a number of compilation manuscripts, such as the Chronique de Terre Sainte of Gestes des Chiprois.
- Bibliotheca geographica Palaestinae (1890). Summaries of over 3500 books on the geography of the Holy Land issued between A.D. 355 and 1878.
- Studien zur Geschichte des fünften Kreuzzuges (1891). Study on the history of the Fifth Crusade.
- Die Jerusalemfahrten der Grafen Philipp, Ludwig (1484) und Reinhard von Hanau (1550) (1891). Accounts of fifteenth- and sixteenth- century pilgrimages to Jerusalem by the house of Hanau-Münzenberg.
- Die eroberung Akkâs durch die Muslimen (1291). An account of the fall of Acre in 1291.
- Regesta Regni Hierosolymitani, MXCVII–MCCXCI (1893), with Additamentum (1904). A collection of some 900 charters of the kingdom of Jerusalem from 1097–1291.
- Karten und Pläne zur Palästinakunde aus dem 7 bis 16 Jahrhundert (1895). A catalog of the eight known Crusader maps of Jerusalem. In Zeitschrift des deutschen Palästina-Vereins Bd.18 (1895), pp. 173–182.
- Syria sacra (1897).
- Geschichte der Kreuzzüge im Umriss (1898). An outline of the history of the Crusades. Covers: the Holy Land pre-1095; pope Urban II and the First Crusade; the kings of Jerusalem through Guy of Lusignan; the Second through Eighth Crusades; minor Crusades and the Children's Crusade; the fall of Acre.
- Geschichte der Königreichs Jerusalem (1100–1291) (1898). A history of the kingdom of Jerusalem from 1100–1291.
- Marino Sanudo sen. als Kartograph Palästinas (1898). In Zeitschrift des deutschen Palästina-Vereins, Bd. 21 (1898), pp. 84–126.
- Deutsche Pilgerreisen nach dem heiligen Lande (1900). German pilgrimages to the Holy Land.
- Geschichte des ersten Kreuzzuges (1901). A history of the First Crusade.

Eduard Winkelmann. Eduard Winkelmann (1838–1896), a German historian.

- Philipp von Schwaben und Otto IV, 2 volumes (1873–1878).

Hans Prutz. Hans Prutz (1843–1929), a German historian.

- Quellenbeiträge zur Geschichte der Kreuzzüge (1874). Source contributions to the Crusades, including works by English chronicler Ralph of Coggeshall (died after 1227) and French or Norman Crusader Walter the Chancellor (died after 1122).
- Geheimlehre und Geheimstatuten des Tempelherrenordens (1879). Translated to The Secret Teaching of the Knights Templar.
- Entwickelung und Untergang des Tempelherrenordens (1888). A history of the rise and fall of the Templars.
- Kulturgeschichte der Kreuzzüge (1883). A cultural history of the Crusades.
- Geschichte des Mittelalters (1889–1892). Edited by Prutz with German historian Julius von Pflugk-Harttung (1848–1919).
- The Economic Development of Western Europe under the influence of the Crusades (1903). In Essays on the Crusades, edited by American historian Dana C. Munro.
- Die Anfänge der Hospitaliter auf Rhodos, 1310–1355 (1908). The beginnings of the Knights Hospitallers in Rhodes from 1310–1355.

Hermann Hagen. Hermann Hagen (1844–1898), a German-Swiss classical philologist. (cf. German Wikipedia, Hermann Hagen)

- Jacobus Bongarsius (1874). A biography of Jacques Bongars (1554–1612).
- Catalogus codicum bernensium (Bibliotheca Bongarsiana) (1875). Edited by H. Hagen.

Heinrich Hagenmeyer. Heinrich Hagenmeyer (1834–1915), a German Protestant pastor and historian, specializing in writing and editing Crusader texts. Closely associated with fellow German Reinhold Röhricht, their contribution to the history of the kingdom of Jerusalem set a sound archival footing for the discipline. In particular, Hagenmeyer's Peter der Eremite established an orthodoxy on the Crusade's origins and course not seriously challenged until the 1980s.

- Ekkehardi Uraugiensis abbatis Hierosolymita (1877). An edition of the Chronicon universale (World Chronicle) of Bavarian abbot and First Crusader Ekkehard of Aura (died 1126).
- Peter der Eremite. Ein kritischer Beitrag zur Geschichte des ersten Kreuzzuges (1879). A critical contribution to the history of the First Crusade and the role of Peter the Hermit.
- Galterii Cancellarii Bella Antiochena. mit Erläuterungen und einem Anhange (1896). An edition of Bella Antiochena (Wars of Antioch) by First Crusader Walter the Chancellor.
- Anonymi gesta Francorum et aliorum hierosolymitanorum (1890). An edition of the anonymous Gesta Francorum et aliorum Hierosolimitanorum written in 1100–1101.
- Epistulae et chartae ad historiam primi belli sacri spectantes, quae supersunt aevo aequales ac genuinae (1901). A collection of letters and charters on the history of the First Crusade, 1088–1100. Also published as Die Kreuzzugsbriefe aus den Jahren 1088–1100.
- Die Kreuzzugsbriefe aus den Jahren 1088–1100 (1901). An alternate edition of Epistulae et chartae ad historiam primi belli sacri spectantes.
- Chronologie de la première croisade 1094–1100 (1902). A day-by-day account of the First Crusade, cross-referenced to original sources, with commentary.
- Chronologie de l'Histoire du Royaume de Jérusalem. Règne de Baudouin I (1101–1118) (1902). In Revue de l'Orient Latin (ROL), Volumes 9–12.
- Fulcheri Carnotensis Historia Hierosolymitana (1059–1127). Mit Erläuterungen und einem Anhange.(1913). An edition of the chronicle Gesta Francorum Iherusalem Perefrinantium by Fulcher of Chartres. With explanations and an appendix.

Charles A. Kohler. Charles A. Kohler (1854–1917), a Swiss archivist and director of the Revue de l'Orient Latin (ROL).

- Itinera hierosolymitana et descriptiones terrae sanctae bellis sacris anteriora (1879). Itineraries of pilgrimages to the Holy Land from the fourth through the eleventh century. Includes Bernard the Pilgrim (fl. 865), Saint Willibald (c. 700 – c. 787), the Venerable Bede (c. 720), Arculf (fl. late seventh century), Theodosius' De situ terrae sanctae (530), Eucherius of Lyon (440), and Saint Paula of Rome (347–404) and her daughter Eustochium. Editor, with French historian Auguste Molinier and Swiss orientalist Titus Tobler.
- Mélanges pour servir à l'Histoire de l'Orient Latin et des Croisades (1906). Selected articles extracted from ROL Tomes IV, V, VI, VII, VIII, IX and X.
- Documents relatifs à Guillaume Adam, archevêque de Sultanieh, puis d'Antivari et son entourage (1906), in Mélanges pour servir à l'Histoire de l'Orient Latin et des Croisades, Volume 2, pp. 475–515. Documents relating to Guillaume Adam (died 1341), archbishop of Soltaniyeh and then of Antivari, and his entourage.

Wilhelm Heyd. Wilhelm Heyd (1823–1906), a German historian. (cf. German Wikipedia, Wilhelm Heyd).

- Geschichte des Levantehandels im mittelalter, 2 volumes (1879).
- Histoire du Commerce du Levant au Moyen-âge, 2 volumes (1885–1886). A French translation of Geschichte des Levantehandels im mittelalter by Marc Furcy-Raynaud (1872–1933).

Theodor Ilgen. Theodor Ilgen (1854–1924), a German archivist and historian.

- Markgraf Conrad von Montferrat (1880). A biography of marquess Conrad of Montferrat (died 1192), de facto king of Jerusalem (as Conrad I) by virtue of his marriage to Isabella I of Jerusalem.

Karl Neumann. Karl Neumann (1860–1934), a German historian.

- Bernard von Clairvaux und die Anfänge des zweiten Kreuzzüges (1882). Bernard of Clairvaux and the beginnings of the Second Crusade.
- Griechische Geschichtschreiber und Geschichtsquellen im zwölften Jahrhundert (1888). Greek historians and sources of history in the 12th century. Studies on Anna Komnene, Theodore Prodromus and John Kinnamos.
- Die Weltstellung des byzantinischen Reiches vor de Kreuzzügen (1894). A history of the Byzantine empire before the Crusades. Includes accounts of Constantine IX Monomachos, George Maniakes and the Norman conquest of southern Italy.

Karl von Lama. Karl von Lama (1841–1920), a German librarian and bookseller. (cf. German Wikipedia, Karl von Lama)

- Bibliothèque des écrivains de la Congrégation de Saint-Maur (1882). Bibliography of Maurist works from the Congregation of Saint Maur between 1645–1787. Compiled by K. von Lama, reducing and completing the earlier Histoire littéraire de la congregation de Saint-Maur of René-Prosper Tassin.

August Reifferscheid. Karl Wilhelm August Reifferscheid (1835–1887), a German archaeologist and classical philologist.

- Annae Comnenae, Porphyrogenitae, Alexias, 2 volumes (1884).

August Müller. August Müller (1848–1892), a German orientalist.

- Der Islam im Morgen- und Abendland, 2 volumes (1885–1887). Reprinted in Allgemeine Geschichte in Einzeldarstellungen.
- Orientalische bibliographie, 26 volumes (1887–1892).

Theodor Wolff. Theodor Wolff (1867–1927), a German historian and editor. (cf. German Wikipedia, Theodor Wolff)

- Die Bauernkreuzzüge des Jahres 1096 : ein Beitrag zur Geschichte der ersten Kreuzzüge (1891). An account of the People's Crusade of 1096.

Julius Hermann Gotthelf Gmelin. Julius Hermann Gotthelf Gmelin (1859–1919), a German historian specializing in the Knights Templar.

- Schuld oder Unschuld des Templerordens: Kritischer Versuch zur Lösung der Frage (1893).

Franz Xaver von Funk. Franz Xaver von Funk (1840–1907), a German Catholic theologian and historian.

- Petrus von Amiens (1895). A history of Peter the Hermit. In Wetzer–Welte Kirchenlexikon, Volume IX.

Richard Sternfeld. Richard Sternfeld (1858–1926), a German historian and musicologist. (cf. German Wikipedia, Richard Sternfeld)

- Ludwigs des heiligen kreuzzug nach Tunis 1270 und die politik Karls I von Sizilien (1896). An account of the Eighth Crusade, Louis IX of France and Charles I of Sicily.

Nicolae Iorga (Jorga). Nicolae Iorga (1871–1940), a Romanian historian and politician.

- Philippe de Mézièves et la croisade au XIVe siècle (1896), in Bibliothèque de l'École des hautes études. Sciences historiques et philologiques, Fascicule 110. An account of French knight Philippe de Mézières (c. 1327–1405) and his quest for a new crusade.
- Notes et extraits pour servir a l'hist. des croisades au XVe siècle, 6 volumes (1899–1916).
- Latins et Grecs d'Orient et l'établissement des Turcs en Europe (1342–1362), in Byzantinische Zeitschrift, Fünfzehn Band (1906).
- Brève histoire des croisades et de leurs fondations en Terre Sainte (1924).

Walter Carl Norden. Walter Carl Norden (1876–1937), a German historian and community scientist. (cf. German Wikipedia, Walter Norden)

- Der vierte Kreuzzug im Rahmen der Beziehungen des Abendlandes zu Byzanz (1898).
- Das Papsttum und Byzanz: die Trennung der beiden Mächte und das Problem ihrer Wiedervereinigung bis zum Untergange des Byzantinischen Reichs (1453) (1903).

Alexander Cartellier. Alexander Cartellieri (1867–1955), a German historian.

- Philipp II August, 4 volumes (1899–1921). A biography of Philip II of France.

Eduard Heyck. Eduard Heyck (1862–1941), a German cultural historian, editor, writer and poet.

- Die Kreuzzüge und das Heilige Land (1900). Covers: pilgrimages and the origins of the Crusades; the First Crusade through the fall of Acre in 1291; law and administration of the Crusader states. Three maps and 163 illustrations.

=== Other historians ===
Original works by other historians, including Sicilian and Muslim historians are the following.

Michele Amari. Michele Amari (1806–1889), a Sicilian patriot and historian.

- Storia dei musulmani di Sicilia (1854).

Namik Kemal. Namik Kemal (1840–1880), a Turkish journalist and political activist. One of the founders of the modern Ottoman literature.

- Selâhaddini Eyyûbî (1872). First modern Muslim biography of Saladin.
- Celâleddin Harzemşah (1875). Biography of Jalal al-Din Mangburni (1199–1231), last shah of the Khwarezmian empire.
- Edebiyat i-Cedide (1884). Ottoman New Literature, includes three works: Salah al-Din – on sultan Saladin (1137–1193), Fatih – on sultan Mehmed II (1432–1481), and Sultan Selim (1470–1520).

Sayyid 'Ali al-Hariri. Sayyid 'Ali al-Hariri (fl. 1899), an Egyptian historian.

- Splendid Accounts in the Crusading Wars (1899), the first Muslim account of the Crusades using Arab sources.

=== Translations of original sources ===
Translations of Arabic, Persian, Coptic and Byzantine works by Western historians include the following.

Joseph White. Joseph White (1745–1814), an English orientalist and theologian.

- Account of Egypt (1800). By Arab historian Abd al-Latif al-Baghdadi (1162–1231). Arabic document first discovered and published by Edward Pococke (1604–1691). His son, Edward Pococke the Younger, then translated a fragment of the work into Latin. Thomas Hunt began the task of completing the translation but did not finish. The Latin translation was then completed by J. White.

Gustav Flügel. Gustav Leberecht Flügel (1802–1870), a German orientalist.

- Bibliographical and Encyclopaedic Lexicon, 7 volumes (1835–1858). A translation of Kaşf az-Zunūn by Kâtip Çelebi. A bibliographic encyclopedia of Arabic works whose title translates to The Removal of Doubt from the Names of Books and the Arts. Published in a French translation by Barthélemy d'Herbelot.

Michael Jan de Goeje. Michael Jan de Goeje (1836–1909), a Dutch orientalist focusing on Arabia and Islam.

- Selection from the Annals of Tabari (1902). Selected translations from the chronicle History of the Prophets and Kings (Annals of Tabari), written by Persian historian Muhammad ibn Jarir al-Tabari (838–923).
- Various works on Arabic geography (see corresponding article).

Beniamino Raffaello Sanguinetti. Beniamino Raffaello Sanguinetti (1811–1883), an Italian orientalist.

- Travels of Ibn Battuta, A.D. 1325–1354 (before 1883). Translation of Moroccan explorer ibn Battūta's Voyages (Rihla) by Sanguinetti with Charles Defrémery (1822–1883) and H. A. R. Gibb (1895–1971).

David Samuel Margoliouth. David Samuel Margoliouth (1858–1940), an English orientalist.

- Umayyads and 'Abbásids, being the fourth part of Jurjí Zaydán's History of Islamic civilization (1907). A translation of Tarikh al-Tamaddun al-Islami, 5 volumes (1901–1906) of Lebanese writer Jurji Zaydan (1861–1914).
- The Eclipse of the Abbasid Caliphate: Original Chronicles of the Fourth Islamic Century, 7 volumes (1920–1921). Edited with British orientalist Henry P. Amedroz (1854–1917). Includes the Book of Viziers of Hilal al-Sabi', Tajárib al-Umam by Miskawayh and the Damascus Chronicles of ibn al-Qalanisi.

Jean-Baptiste Chabot. Jean-Baptiste Chabot (1860–1948), a leading French Syriac scholar.

- Chronique de Michel le Syrien: patriarche jacobite d'Antioche, 1166–1199, 4 volumes (1899–1910). A translation of The Chronicle of Michael the Syrian (1126–1199).
- Répertoire d'Epigraphie Sémitique (RES), 8 volumes (1900). With French archaeologist Charles Simon Clermont-Ganneau (1846–1923). Published by the Commission du Corpus inscriptionum semiticarum.
- Corpus Scriptorum Christianorum Orientalium (CSCO), 600+ volumes (1903 ff.). A collection of Eastern Christian texts in Syriac, Arabic, Coptic, Ethopic, Armenian and Georgian. Editor, with French orientalist Bernard Carra de Vaux (1867–1953), Chaldean priest and orientalist Louis Cheikho (1859–1927), Italian orientalist Ignazio Guidi (1844–1935) and Franco-American Coptologist Henri Hyvernat (1858–1941).

Constantine Sathas. Constantine Sathas (1842–1914), a Greek historian and researcher.

- Biblioteca Graeca Medii Aevi (Medieval Library), 7 volumes (1872–1894). Collection of Greek, Byzantine and post-Byzantine works, including works by Michael Attaliates, Niketas Choniates, Theodoros Metochites, Leontios Machairas, Kaisarios Dapontes, Anastasios Gordios, Michael Psellos, and lists of martyrs, catalogs and mixed writings from Jerusalem, Cyprus and Crete.
- Documents inédits relatifs à l'histoire de la Grèce au Moyen Âge publi es sous les auspices del la Chambre des députés de Grèce, 9 volumes (1880–1890). Mnēmeia Hellēnikēs historias or Monuments of Greek history.

Charles Henri Auguste Schefer. Charles Henri Auguste Schefer (1820–1898), a French historian. (cf. French Wikipedia, Charles-Henri-Auguste Schefer)

- Description des lieux saints de la Galilée et de la Palestine (1881). Translation of work by Aboul Hassan Aly el Herewy.
- Description topographique et historique de Boukhara (1892). A translation of Tarikh-i Bukhara, by Bukharan historian Abu Bakr Muhammad ibn Jafar Narshakhi (c. 899 – 959).
- Catalogue de la collection de manuscrits orientaux, arabes, persans et turcs (1900).
- Translation of accounts of journeys to the Holy Land. See Section 6.

François Nau. François Nau (1864–1931), a French Catholic priest, mathematician, Syriacist, and specialist in oriental languages.

- Patrologia Orientalis (PO), 49 volumes (1907, ongoing). Edited by F. Nau and French Syriacist René Graffin (1858–1941). A collection of medieval writings through the fifteenth century of eastern Church Fathers in Syriac, Armenian, Arabic, Coptic, Ethopic and Georgian.

Louis R. Bréhier. Louis R. Bréhier (1869–1951), a French historian specializing in Byzantine studies.

- Histoire anonyme de la première croisade (1924). A translation of the anonymous account of the First Crusade, Gesta Francorum (Deeds of the Franks).

== Encyclopedias ==
The first encyclopedia article on the Crusades is credited to Denis Diderot in the 18th century. In the 19th and early 20th centuries, three encyclopedia articles are frequently referenced. These are Philip Schaff's article in the Schaff-Herzog Encyclopaedia of Religious Knowledge; Louis Bréhier's two works on the Crusades and their Bibliography and Sources in the Catholic Encyclopedia; and the work of Ernest Barker in the 11th edition of the Encyclopædia Britannica, later expanded into a separate publication. All three include bibliographies showing histories deemed important at the time and the articles were described as "proof that not all old things are useless."

Denis Diderot. Denis Diderot (1713–1784), French author who regarded the effects of the Crusades as "uniformly dire" (Oeuvres, Volume 14).

- Encyclopédie (1751–1772). The entry on Crusades in Volume 2 is based on Voltaire's Histoire des Croisades.
- Oeuvres, 26 volumes, edited by French philosopher Jacques-André Naigeon (1738–1810), published 1821–1834.

Ersch-Gruber Encyclopädie. The Allgemeine Encyclopädie der Wissenschaften und Künste, 167 volumes (1813–1889). The Universal Encyclopaedia of Sciences and Arts, originally compiled by German bibliographers Samuel Ersch (1766–1828) and Johann Gottfried Gruber (1774–1851).

Philip Schaff. Philip Schaff (1819–1893), a Swiss theologian and ecclesiastical historian.

- History of the Christian Church, 8 volumes (1858–1867). Volume 5: The Middle Ages from Gregory VII (1049) to Boniface VIII (1294). Chapter VII: The Crusades, covers the First Crusade through the fall of Acre in 1291. Includes discussion on literature.
- Schaff-Herzog Encyclopaedia of Religious Knowledge (1884). Editor of the general work and author of influential article on the Crusades in Volume 3, pp. 315–318. Covers the first eight Crusades (combining the last two into one). Topics include: The First Crusade, 1096–1099; The Second and Third Crusades, 1147–1149, 1189–1192; The Fourth Crusade, 1202–1204; The Fifth, Sixth, and Seventh Crusades, 1228–1270; Power of Papacy Increased, also Intolerance; Devotion Stimulated, Absolution Extended; The Renaissance and Reformation; with extensive bibliography.

Allgemeine Geschichte in Einzeldarstellungen. The Allgemeine Geschichte in Einzeldarstellungen, 45 volumes, Berlin (1876–1891), edited by German historian Christian Friedrich Georg Wilhelm Oncken (1838–1905). Allgemeine Geschichte in Einzeldarstellungen (General history in individual representations) includes Bernard von Kugler's Geschichte der Kreuzzüge and August Müller's Der Islam im Morgen- und Abendland. (cf. German Wikipedia, Allgemeine Geschichte in Einzeldarstellungen).

Louis R. Bréhier. Louis R. Bréhier (1869–1951), a French historian specializing in Byzantine studies.

- Crusades (1908). In the Catholic Encyclopedia. An overview of the history of the Crusades, numbered as eight. Topics include: I. Origin of the Crusades; II. Foundation of Christian states in the East; III. First destruction of the Christian states (1144–1187); IV. Attempts to restore the Christian states and the Crusade against Saint-Jean d'Acre (1192–1198); V. The Crusade against Constantinople (1204); VI. The thirteenth-century Crusades (1217–1252); VII. Final loss of the Christian colonies of the East (1254–1291); VIII. The fourteenth-century Crusade and the Ottoman invasion; IX. The Crusade in the fifteenth century; X. Modifications and survival of the idea of the Crusade.
- Crusades (Bibliography and Sources) (1908). A concise summary of the historiography of the Crusades. In the Catholic Encyclopedia.

Ernest Barker. Ernest Barker (1874–1960), an English political scientist.

- Crusades (1911), in the 11th edition of the Encyclopædia Britannica. A summary of the history of the Crusades, with sections on the Meaning of the Crusades, Historical Causes of the Crusades, and Literature of Crusades.
- The Crusades (1923). A later edition of the Encyclopædia Britannica article, edited with additional notes.

== See also ==
- Crusades
- Crusader States
- Crusading Movement
- Islamic view on the Crusades
