= Scévole de Sainte-Marthe =

Scévole de Sainte-Marthe may refer to:

- Scévole de Sainte-Marthe (1536–1623), French poet
- Scévole de Sainte-Marthe (1571–1650), French historian
