= Ferdinando Ughelli =

Italian abbot (1595–1670)

Dom Ferdinando Ughelli OCist
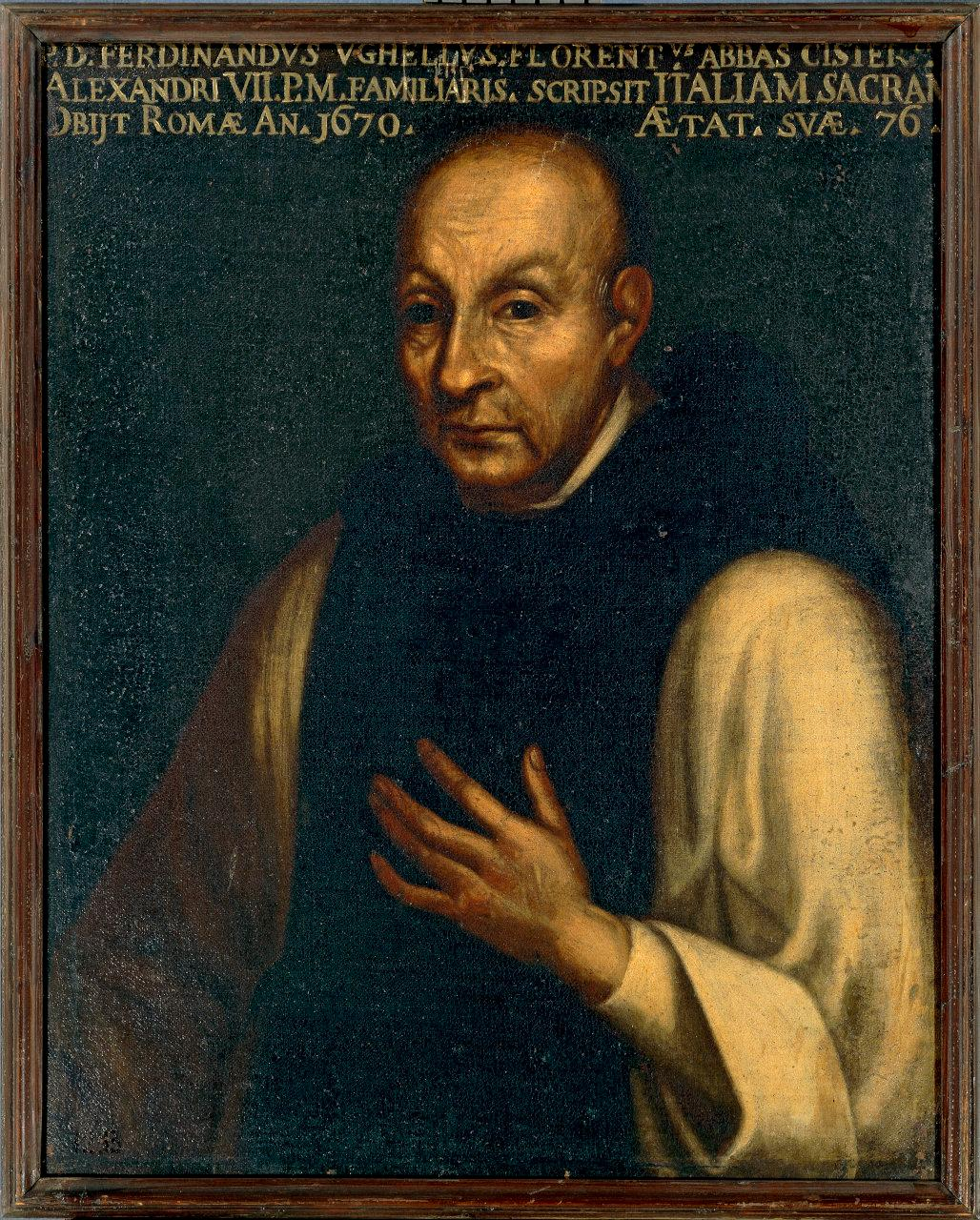
- 17th century portrait of Ferdinando Ughelli, Milan, Pinacoteca Ambrosiana
- Title: abbot

Personal life
- Born: 21 March 1595 Florence, Grand Duchy of Tuscany
- Died: 19 May 1670 (aged 75) Rome, Papal States
- Resting place: Chiesa dei Santi Vincenzo e Anastasio alle Tre Fontane
- Education: Roman College
- Known for: Italia sacra sive de episcopis Italiæ
- Occupation: Cistercian monk; Historian

Religious life
- Religion: Roman Catholicism
- Order: Cistercians
- Ordination: 1618

Ferdinando Ughelli OCist (Italian pronunciation: [ferdiˈnando uˈɡɛlli]; 21 March 1595 – 19 May 1670) was an Italian Cistercian monk and church historian. He is best known for his monumental Italia Sacra, a massive nine-volume treatise detailing the history of all Italian dioceses from the earliest Christian centuries to his day.

== Biography ==
Born in Florence on 21 March 1595, Ferdinando Ughelli was a member of a prominent and wealthy family. He entered the Cistercian Order in 1610 and was sent to the Gregorian University in Rome, where he studied under the Jesuits Francesco Piccolomini and John de Lugo. On the completion of his studies Ughelli was elected prior of the monastery of Cestello and between 1628 and 1631 he was abbot of San Galgano near Chiusdino (Siena). In 1632 he became abbot of Nonantola.

In the 1620s Ughelli worked, together with the Luke Wadding, Andrea Vittorelli, Girolamo Aleandro, and Cesare Becilli to the revision of Ciacconius' Vitae et Res gestae Summorum Pontificum et S.R.E. Cardinalium. The new edition appeared from the Vatican Press in 1630.

He filled many important posts in his order, being Abbot of Badia a Settimo near Florence, and, from 1638, Abbot of Tre Fontane in Rome, which is now a Trappist house. Ughelli was skilled in ecclesiastical history. His position allowed him easy access to the archives and libraries of Rome. To encourage him in this work and to defray the expense of the journeys it entailed, Pope Alexander VII granted him an annual pension of 500 scudi. He was a consultor of the Index Librorum Prohibitorum and theologian to Cardinal Giancarlo de' Medici; he was frequently offered the episcopal dignity, which he refused.

Ughelli died in Rome on 19 May 1670 and was buried in his abbatial church. An epitaph was put on his tomb, composed by his patron Cardinal Francesco Barberini. In gratitude to Barberini, Ughelli left him a great number of his manuscripts. Ughelli's manuscripts entered the Vatican Library when Pope Leo XIII bought the Barberini collection in 1902 (Barb. Lat., 3239-46).

== Literary works ==
His chief work is Italia sacra sive de episcopis Italiæ (9 vols, 1643–1662), an account of all the episcopal sees of Italy, with lists of the bishops and a great deal of information regarding the history of Italy. In compiling this work, Ughelli frequently had to deal with matters not previously treated by historians; as a result, the Italia sacra, owing to the imperfections of historical science in Ughelli's day, especially from the point of view of criticism and diplomatics, contains serious errors, particularly as the author was more intent on collecting than on weighing documents. Nevertheless, his work with all its imperfections was necessary to facilitate the labours of critical historians of a later day, and is consulted even now. In the last volume of the Italia sacra he published various historical sources until then unedited.

Ughelli's achievement deserves the highest praise. It was an astonishing performance, which did something to foster Italian self-consciousness, though this was not Ughelli's aim; and of course it led to similar books being compiled for every other large country in Europe: Gallia Christiana, the French equivalent of Ughelli's undertaking, appeared twelve years later while Henry Wharton's Anglia sacra was only published in 1691.

Ughelli's work was abridged by Giulio Ambrogio Lucenti (Rome, 1704) and republished, with corrections and additions, by Nicola Coleti (10 vols, Venice, 1717-22). Coleti brought the information down to his own day. Since then, although the early history of some of the dioceses has been reinvestigated in a thoroughly scholarly way, nothing of a general kind has been attempted. Giovanni Giacinto Sbaraglia's Supplementum ad Italiam sacram Ferdinandi Ughelli was left unpublished, while Nivardo del Riccio's new edition of Ughelli's work never came to fruition. Gaetano Moroni in his dictionary (Venice, 1840-61) is entirely dependent on Ughelli when traversing similar territory; Giuseppe Cappelletti's Le chiese d'Italia (Venice, 1844–79) paraphrases Ughelli in Italian and for all practical purposes may be forgotten. Ughelli's work exerted a great influence on Gams' Series episcoporum ecclesiæ catholicæ (1873-86) and on Eubel's Hierarchia Catholica Medii Aevi (1913–1967).

Among his other writings are:

- Cardinalium elogia ex sacro ordine cisterciensi (1624): writings in praise of cardinals of his order and the papal privileges granted to it;
- Columnensis familiæ cardinalium imagines (1650): biographies of cardinals of the Colonna family.
- genealogical works on the Counts of Marsciano (1667) and the Capizucchi (1653);
- Aggiunte ("additions") to the Vitae et res gestae pontificum by Alphonsus Ciacconius.

Ughelli corresponded with several important scholars, including Leo Allatius, Constantino Cajetan, Luke Wadding, Karel de Visch and Pierre de Sainte-Marthe (the son of the Maurist scholar Scévole). Pierre, together with his brother Louis, compiled in 1656 the Gallia Christiana, the French equivalent of Ughelli's work on the Italian dioceses.
