= Franz Mone =

German historian (1796–1871)

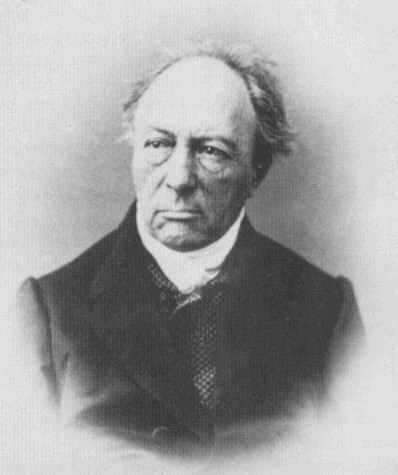
Franz Mone

Franz Josef Mone (12 May 1796, in Mingolsheim near Bruchsal, Baden – 12 March 1871, in Karlsruhe) was a historian and archaeologist.

He attended the gymnasium at Bruchsal and in 1814 entered Heidelberg University, where in 1817 he was appointed a lecturer (privatdozent) in history, in 1818 a secretary at the university library, in 1819 an associate professor, in 1822 a full professor, and in 1825 head of the university library. From 1827 to 1831 he was a professor at the Catholic University of Leuven. On his return to Baden, he edited for a period the Karlsruher Zeitung; in 1835 he became archivist and director of the General National Archives in Karlsruhe, and retired in 1868.

== Publications ==
- His works on early history (Urgeschichte des badischen Landes - Early history of the region of Baden; 2 vols., 1845; Die gallische Sprache, 1851, and Celtische Forschungen, 1857) have been criticised for a tendency to trace most phenomena to a Celtic origin.
- His works on literary history include:
  - Einleitung in das Nibelungenlied (Introduction to the Nibelungenlied, 1818);
  - Geschichte des Heidentums im nördlichen Europa (2 vols., 1822-3);
  - Otnit (1821);
  - Quellen und Forschungen zur Geschichte der deutschen Literatur und Sprache (Sources and Research into the history of German language and literature, 1830)
  - Untersuchungen zur Geschichte der deutschen Heldensage (Investigations into the history of German Heroic Sagas, 1836);
  - Uebersicht der niederländischen Volksliteratur älterer Zeit (1838).
- In the Anzeiger für Kunde des deutschen Mittelalters (1835-9), he calls attention to a mass of unknown materials.
- On the history of drama are his editions of Altdeutsche Schauspiele (1841) and Schauspiele des Mittelalters (2 vols., 1846).
- His works, Lateinische und griechische Messen (Latin and Greek masses, 1850) and Lateinische Hymnen (3 vols., 1853-5), advanced the knowledge of liturgy and ecclesiastical poetry, and offered liturgical documents not published elsewhere.
- On the history of his native region:
  - Badisches Archiv (2 vols., 1826-7);
  - Quellensammlung der badischen Landesgeschichte (4 vols., 1848–67);
  - the second volume of the Episcopatus Constantiensis of Trudpert Neugart (1862)
  - the Zeitschrift für die Geschichte des Oberrheins (Journal of the History of the Upper Rhein; 21 vols., 1850–68), which was founded by Mone, and in which most of the articles during these early years were from his pen. It was continued subsequently by the General Archives and by the Historical Commission of Baden. In his works the economico-historical interest is always in the foreground.
- He was an earnest Catholic, and took part in the Baden ecclesiastical-political strife during the forties, publishing the two aggressive anonymous pamphlets, Die katholischen Zustände in Baden (Conditions for Catholics in Baden; 1841-3).
