= Barthélemy Hauréau =

French historian, journalist and administrator (1812–1896)

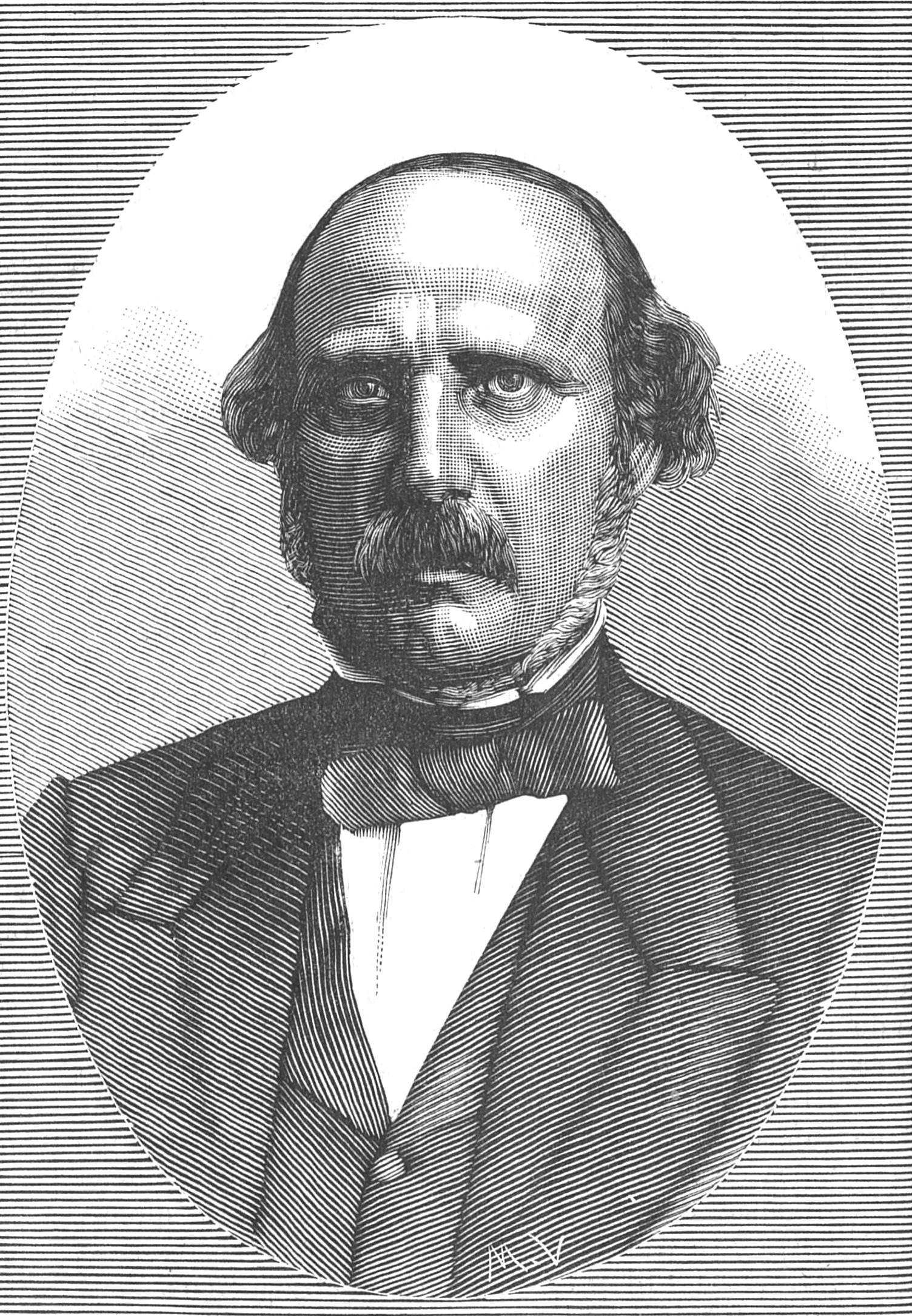
Barthélemy Hauréau (13 May 1877)

Jean-Barthélemy Hauréau (French: [oʁeo]; 9 November 1812 – 29 April 1896) was a French historian, journalist and administrator.

== Education and appointments ==
Born in Paris, he was educated at the Louis-le-Grand and Bourbon colleges in his native city, and won high honours at his public examination. After graduating he became a journalist, and soon was a contributor to several democratic papers: La Tribune, Le National, Le Droit, and La Revue du Nord; at Le National, he was praised by Théophile Gautier as the "tribune" of romanticism. At the age of twenty he published a series of apologetic studies on the Montagnards — in later years, regretting his youthful enthusiasm, he attempted to destroy the studies. In 1838 he took the chief editorship of the Courrier de la Sarthe and was appointed librarian of the city of Le Mans, which position he retained until 1845, when he was dismissed on account of comments of his on the daring speech of the Mayor of le Mans to the Duke of Nemours. He returned to Paris and once more became one of the editors of Le National.

At this time he seemed destined for a political career, and after the revolution of 24 February 1848 was elected to the National Assembly; but close contact with revolutionary men and ideas cooled his old ardour. Throughout his life he opposed innovation, not only in politics and religion, but also in literature. After the coup d'état he resigned his position as director of the manuscript department of the Bibliothèque Nationale, to which he had been appointed in 1848, and refused to accept an administrative post until after the fall of the empire. Having acted as director of the national printing press from 1870 to 1881, he retired, but in 1893 accepted the post of director of the Fondation Thiers. He was also a member of the council of improvement of the École des Chartes.

== Historical writing ==
For over half a century he wrote on the religious, philosophical, and more particularly the literary history of the Middle Ages. Appointed librarian of the town of Le Mans in 1838, he was first attracted by the history of Maine, and in 1843 published the first volume of his Histoire littéraire du Maine (4 vols., 1843–1852), which he subsequently recast on a new plan (10 vols., 1870–1877). In 1845 he brought out an edition of vol. ii of Gilles Ménage's Histoire de Sablé. He then undertook the continuation of the Gallia christiana, and produced vol. xiv (1856) for the province of Tours, vol. xv (1862) for the province of Besançon, and vol. xvi (1865–1870) for the province of Vienne. This work gained him admission to the Académie des Inscriptions et Belles-Lettres (1862).

In the Notices et extraits des manuscrits he inserted several papers which were afterwards published separately, with additions and corrections, under the title Notices et extraits de quelques manuscrits de la Bibliothèque nationale (6 vols., 1890–1893). To the Histoire littéraire de la France he contributed a number of studies, among which must be mentioned that relating to the sermon-writers (vol. xxvi), whose works, being often anonymous, raise many problems of attribution.

Among his other works were the remarkable Histoire de la philosophie scolastique (1872–1880); Les Mélanges poétiques d'Hildebert de Lavardin (1852); an edition of the Works of Hugh of St Victor (1886); a critical study of the Latin poems attributed to St Bernard (1870); and Bernard Délicieux et l'Inquisition albigeoise (1877). To these must be added his contributions to the Dictionnaire des sciences philosophiques, Didot's Biographie générale, the Bibliothèque de l'École des Chartes, and the Journal des savants.

From the time of his appointment to the Bibliothèque Nationale up to the last days of his life he was engaged in making abstracts of all the medieval Latin writings (many anonymous or of doubtful attribution) relating to philosophy, theology, grammar, Canon law, and poetry, carefully noting on cards the first words of each passage.

He died in Paris. After his death this index of incipits, arranged alphabetically, was presented to the Académie des Inscriptions et Belles-Lettres, and a copy was placed in the manuscript department of the Bibliothèque Nationale.

== Works ==
Haureau acquired by his work the reputation of a first-rate scholar. In addition to numerous articles published in the Dictionnaire des sciences philosophiques, l'Encyclopédie nouvelle, l'Encyclopédie moderne, the Biographie générale of Didot, le Siècle, etc., he wrote:

- La Montagne (Paris 1834), historical and philosophical notices on key members of The Mountain, with their portraits engraved etchings by Philippe-Auguste Jeanron, including biographies of Danton, Camille Desmoulins, Collot d'Herbois, Marat, Fouquier-Tinville, Robespierre, Saint-Just, etc. Initially scheduled for May 1832, publication took place in 1834 because of insurrections.
- Critique des hypothèses métaphysiques de Manès et de Pélage et de l'idéalisme transcendal de saint Augustine (Le Mans, 1840);
- Histoire littéraire du Maine (Paris Lanier 1843–1852, 4 vol. in-8°), which he reworked and enriched between 1870 and 1877, enlarging it to 10 volumes; see full text of Histoire littéraire du Maine, coll. CD-ROM, Copyright Société historique et archéologique du Maine, Le Mans, 2006.
- Manuel du clergé ou Examen de l'ouvrage de M. Bouvier, (Angers, 1844), commentaries on the book by Jean-Baptiste Bouvier, bishop of Le Mans, Institutiones theologicae ad usum seminariorum, that earned him severe attacks by clericals;
- Histoire de la Pologne (Paris 1844);
- Histoire de la peinture (1848–1852, in-32);
- Examen critique de la philosophie scolastique (1848, 2 vol. in-8°), work crowned the same year by the Académie des sciences morales et politiques;
- Charlemagne et sa cour (1852);
- François Ier et sa cour (Paris Hachette 1853);
- Gallia Christiana, volume XIV (province of Tours) (1856);
- Hugues de Saint-Victor (Paris 1859), then in 1886 new edition with considerable additions;
- Singularités historiques et littéraires (Paris 1861);
- Gallia Christiana, volume XV (province of Besançon) (1862);
- Catalogue chronologique des œuvres de J.-B. Gerbier (1863);
- Histoire de la philosophie scolastique (1863–1880) in three volumes;
- Gallia Christiana, volume XVI (province of Vienne) (1870);
- Bernard Délicieux et l'inquisition albigeoise (Paris Hachette 1877);
- Notices et extraits de quelques manuscrits de la Bibliothèque Nationale (Paris Klincksieck 6 volumes, from 1890 to 1893);
  - vol. 1: https://archive.org/details/noticesetextrai02manugoog
  - vol. 2: https://archive.org/details/noticesetextrai03manugoog
  - vol. 3: https://archive.org/details/noticesetextrai04manugoog
  - vol. 4: https://archive.org/details/noticesetextrai00manugoog
  - vol. 5: https://archive.org/details/noticesetextrai05manugoog
  - vol. 6: https://archive.org/details/noticesetextrai01manugoog
- The Pharsalia by Lucan, and Facétie sur la mort de Claude by Seneca translated for the Latins Classiques of M. Nisard, etc.

But of all the work of the industrious and wise writer, the one which especially contributed to its reputation is his continuation of the Gallia Christiana of the Benedictines. This work was started and continued until the 13th volume by the Benedictine of the Abbaye de Saint-Maur. Between 1856 and 1870 Haureau added three more volumes, written in Latin to maintain the unity of the work. The Académie des inscriptions et belles-lettres has several times awarded its own Prix Gobert to this work of high scholarship (not to be confused with the Grand prix Gobert of the Académie française).

=== Portrait ===
- Pen drawing executed during a session of the Académie des inscriptions et belles-lettres or the Journal des savants, by Adrien Prévost de Longpérier, in Revue Historique et Archéologique du Maine, Le Mans, 2006, (p. 129)

== Honors and awards ==
Commander of the Order of Legion of Honour (1878)
