= Italia Sacra =

17th-century Catalogue of Catholic dioceses and abbeys of Italy

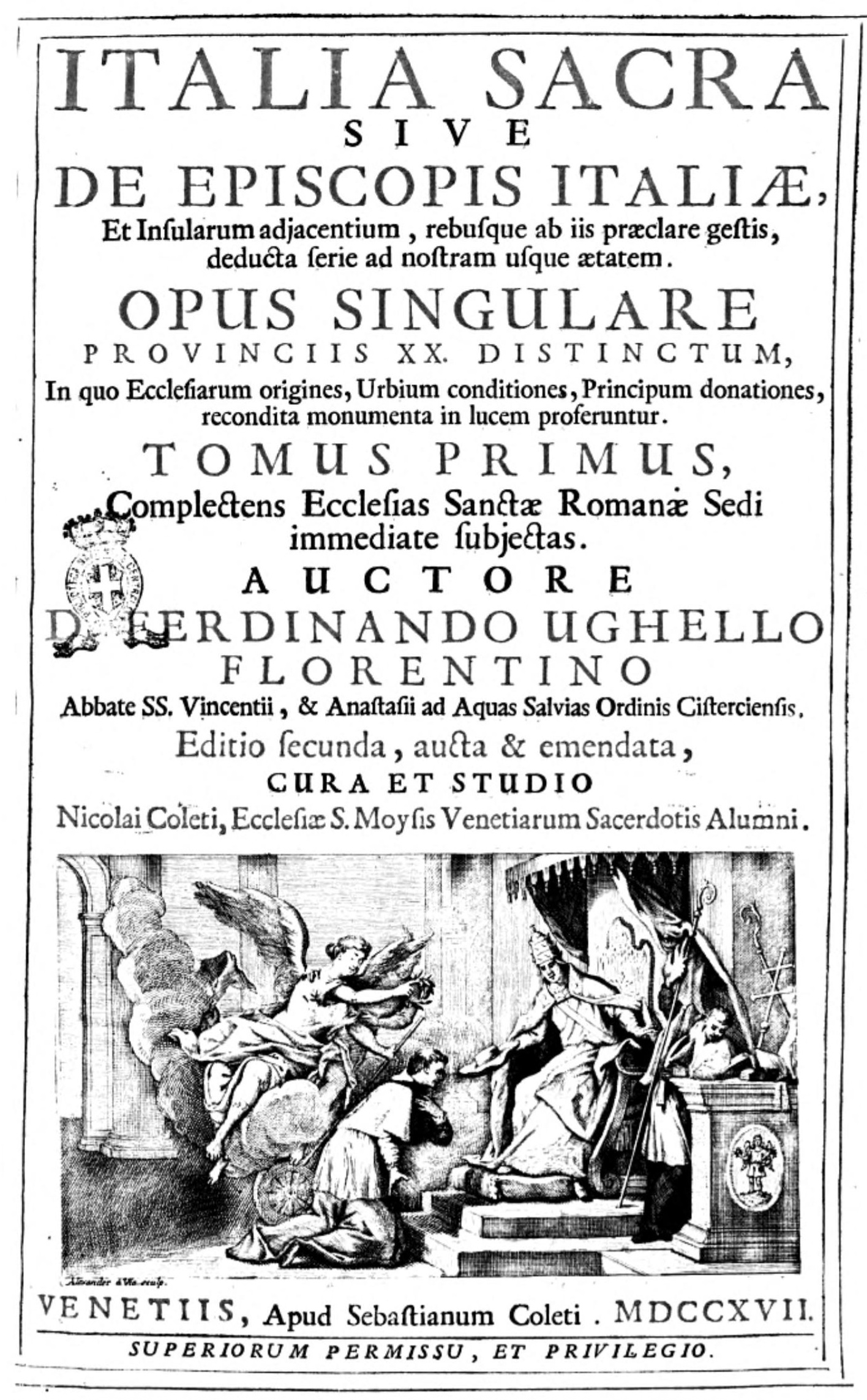
Titlepage of the first volume of Coleti's edition of the Italia Sacra, Venice, 1717

The Italia Sacra (full title: Italia sacra sive De episcopis Italiae et insularum adjacentum, rebusque ab iis praeclare gestis deducta ad nostram usque aetatem) is a documentary catalogue or list, complete with historical notices, of all the Catholic dioceses and abbeys of Italy from the earliest times, also of their occupants. It was the first comprehensive history of Italian dioceses.

== Ughelli edition ==
Written entirely in Latin, the Italia Sacra was published by Abbot Ferdinando Ughelli in Rome in nine volumes between 1642 and 1662. The work is 'a monument of erudition, full of documents (hagiographic, epigraphic and diplomatic), with reproductions of seals and inscriptions'. Faithful to the documents he consulted, Ughelli states in the general introduction that he will quote them verbatim, even though their Latin is often barbaric and uncouth, adopting a new approach to the sources which was certainly influenced by the teaching of the Maurist school.

The Italia Sacra contains a complete list of bishops from Italian dioceses, along with biographical information, historical notes and unpublished documents. As Ughelli himself tells us, it took him more than ten years to complete this work. In compiling it, Ughelli often had to address issues that had not been considered by other historians. Consequently, due to the limitations of historical scholarship at that time, particularly with regard to criticism and diplomatics, the Italia Sacra contains significant errors, primarily because the author prioritised collecting documents over critically evaluating them. Despite its imperfections, however, his work has been indispensable to all subsequent historians and remains fundamental to anyone studying the history of the Italian church today.

== Coleti edition and legacy ==
A revised and expanded edition of Ughelli's Italia Sacra was published in ten volumes by the Venetian publisher and scholar Nicola Coleti between 1717 and 1722.

Ughelli's work was the prototype for similar publications across Europe. Following its model, Cardinal Cardinal Mazarin commissioned the de Sainte-Marthe brothers to compile the Gallia Christiana, published in 1656. The Italia Sacra served as a model also for Martin Gerbert's Germania Sacra.

== Volumes ==
First edition

- Ughelli, Ferdinando (1644). Italia sacra (in Latin). Vol. 1. Romae: apud Bernardinum Tanum.
- Ughelli, Ferdinando (1647). Italia sacra (in Latin). Vol. 2. Romae: apud Bernardinum Tanum.
- Ughelli, Ferdinando (1647). Italia sacra (in Latin). Vol. 3. Romae: apud Bernardinum Tanum.
- Ughelli, Ferdinando (1652). Italia sacra (in Latin). Vol. 4. Romae: Sumptibus Blasij Deversin, & Zenobij Masotti.
- Ughelli, Ferdinando (1653). Italia sacra (in Latin). Vol. 5. Romae: Sumptibus Blasij Deversin, & Zenobij Masotti.
- Ughelli, Ferdinando (1659). Italia sacra (in Latin). Vol. 6. Romae: Ex Typographia Reuerendae Camerae Apostolicae.
- Ughelli, Ferdinando (1659). Italia sacra (in Latin). Vol. 7. Romae: Sumptibus Blasij Deversin, & Zenobij Masotti.
- Ughelli, Ferdinando (1662). Italia sacra (in Latin). Vol. 8. Romae: Sumptibus Blasij Deversin, & Zenobij Masotti.
- Ughelli, Ferdinando (1662). Italia sacra (in Latin). Vol. 9. Romae: Sumptibus Blasij Deversin, & Zenobij Masotti.

Second edition (ed. by di N. Coleti)

- Ughelli, Ferdinando (1717). Italia sacra (in Latin). Vol. 1. Venetiis: Apud Sebastianum Coleti.
- Ughelli, Ferdinando (1717). Italia sacra (in Latin). Vol. 2. Venetiis: Apud Sebastianum Coleti.
- Ughelli, Ferdinando (1718). Italia sacra (in Latin). Vol. 3. Venetiis: Apud Sebastianum Coleti.
- Ughelli, Ferdinando (1719). Italia sacra (in Latin). Vol. 4. Venetiis: Apud Sebastianum Coleti.
- Ughelli, Ferdinando (1720). Italia sacra (in Latin). Vol. 5. Venetiis: Apud Sebastianum Coleti.
- Ughelli, Ferdinando (1720). Italia sacra (in Latin). Vol. 6. Venetiis: Apud Sebastianum Coleti.
- Ughelli, Ferdinando (1721). Italia sacra (in Latin). Vol. 7. Venetiis: Apud Sebastianum Coleti.
- Ughelli, Ferdinando (1721). Italia sacra (in Latin). Vol. 8. Venetiis: Apud Sebastianum Coleti.
- Ughelli, Ferdinando (1721). Italia sacra (in Latin). Vol. 9. Venetiis: Apud Sebastianum Coleti.
- Ughelli, Ferdinando (1722). Italia sacra (in Latin). Vol. 10. Venetiis: Apud Sebastianum Coleti.
