= Nicola Coleti =

Italian Catholic priest and historian

- Born: 1681; Venice, Republic of Venice
- Died: February 1765; Venice, Republic of Venice
- Education: University of Padua
- Occupations: Historian, Catholic priest

Nicola Coleti (or Coletti; 1680 – February 1765) was an Italian Catholic priest and historian.

== Life ==
Born in Venice, he studied at Padua, where he received the degree of Doctor. He was sent to the church of San Moisè at Venice, and there devoted himself to historical and antiquarian research.

He died at Venice in 1765.

== Works ==
His first work of importance was a new edition of Ferdinando Ughelli's Italia Sacra published in ten volumes from 1717 to 1722. Besides correcting many errors, Coleti continued Ughelli's history to the beginning of the eighteenth century.

Coleti then undertook the compilation of his large work entitled Collectio Conciliorum. Up to this time there had been two standard histories of the councils, Sacrorum conciliorum nova et amplissima collectio by Philippe Labbe and Gabriel Cossart (1671–72), its supplement compiled by Étienne Baluze (of which only the first volume was published), and the collection of Jean Hardouin (1715). Coleti's collection was based on that of Labbe and Cossart, though he used Baluze and Hardouin. It was published by his brother Sebastiano from 1728 to 1733 in twenty-three volumes. The last two were called Apparatus primus and Apparatus secundus, containing the indexes.

Other works of Coleti's were Series episcoporum Cremonensium aucta (1749), and Monumenta ecclesiæ Venetæ S. Moisis (1758). Coleti also annotated a manuscript of Scipione Maffei, now preserved in the Biblioteca Vallicelliana at Rome.
