= Claude-François Ménestrier =

French heraldist and writer

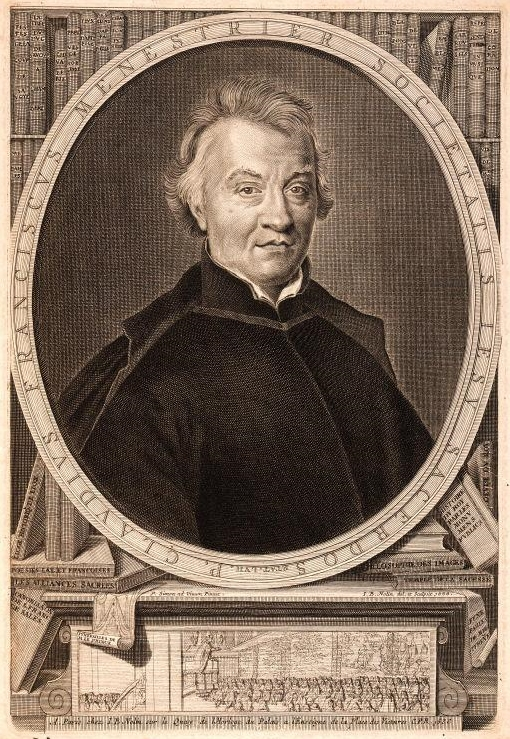
Claude-François Ménestrier

Claude-François Ménestrier SJ (9 March 1631 – 21 January 1705) was a French heraldist, writer, member of the Society of Jesus [Jesuit], and attendant of the royal court.

Ménestrier was born in Lyon. He composed numerous books on heraldry, in which he was one of the greatest authorities of his age, the professor of the colleges in Chambéry, Vienne, Grenoble, and Lyon. During 1669-70 he traveled to Germany and Italy, but reached Paris and lived there to his death. Menestrier's early treatises clearly show the influence of Emanuele Tesauro's theoretical work, and in particular the content of his best-known treatise, the Cannocchiale aristotelico. He was the most widely known heraldist of his time, and was from 1622 in close correspondence with Philipp Jakob Spener, the founder of the German scientific heraldry who refused the merely symbolic interpretation of arms. Ménestrier maintained that we can know the essence of heraldry only from the sources from the age of living heraldry but he was also influenced by the heraldic view of his age. Thus, his researches were abortive.

Ménestrier's essays "On Ancient and Modern Musical Productions" (Des Représentations en musique anciennes et modernes, 1681) and "On Ancient and Modern Ballets, After The Rules of Theatre" (Des Ballets anciens et modernes selon les règles du théâtre, 1682) were influential in the development of ballet as a dramatic concert dance style capable of expressing a wide range of emotion and narrating a complex story, drawing upon accounts of ancient Roman pantomime.

Ménestrier was also a numismatist and antiquary. In 1689 he published his Histoire du Roy Louis le Grand par les médailles. emblêmes, devises, jettons, inscriptions, armoiries, et autres monumens publics. The book was the first antiquarian history of a modern individual, and largely used medals drawn from the collection of Père François de la Chaise. It also covered jettons and heraldic devices. Unfortunately for Ménestrier a pirated 1691 Dutch edition included five pages of anti-Louis medals, harming Ménestrier's position at court.

== Works ==
- L'Autel de Lyon, consacré a Louys Auguste, et placé dans le temple de la gloire. Ballet dédié à Sa Majesté en son entrée à Lyon, Lyon, Jean Molin, 1658
- Le véritable art du blason et l'origine des armoiries, Lyon, Benoît Coral, 1659
- Les Réjouissances de la paix, avec un recueil de diverses pièces sur ce sujet, Lyon, Benoît Coral, 1660
- Abbrégé méthodique des principes héraldiques, ou du Véritable art du blason, Lyon, Benoît Coral, 1661
- L'Art des emblèmes, Lyon, Benoît Coral, 1662
- Éloge historique de la Ville de Lyon et sa grandeur consulaire sous les romains & sous nos rois, Lyon, Benoît Coral, 1669
- Traité des tournois, joustes, carrousels et autres spectacles publics, Lyon, Jean Muguet, 1669
- Le Chemin de l'honneur, jeu d'armoiries, Lyon, Benoît Coral, 1672
- Les diverses especes de noblesse, et les manieres d'en dresser les preuves, Paris, Amaulry et Guignard, 1681
- Lettre d'un gentilhomme de province à une dame de qualité, au sujet de la comète, Paris, Michallet, 1681
- Des Représentations en musique anciennes et modernes, Paris, René Guignard, 1681
- Des Ballets anciens et modernes selon les règles du théâtre, Paris, René Guignard, 1682
- La Philosophie des images, composée d'un ample recueil de devises, Paris, de La Caille, 1682
- De la Chevalerie ancienne et moderne avec la manière d'en faire les preuves, Paris, de La Caille, 1683
- Des Décorations funèbres, où il est amplement traité des tentures, des lumières, des mausolées, catafalques, inscriptions et autres ornemens funèbres, Paris, de La Caille, 1683
- L'art des Emblèmes, où s'enseigne la morale par les figures de la fable, de l'histoire, & de la nature. Paris, de La Caille, 1684.
- La méthode du blason, Paris, Michallet, 1688
- Réfutation des prétendues prophéties de St Malachie, Paris, 1689
- Histoire du règne de Louis-Le-Grand par les médailles, emblèmes, devises, jetons, inscriptions, armoiries et autres monuments publics, Paris, B. Nolin, 1689 Online text
- Le jeu de cartes du blason, Lyon, Thomas Amaulry, 1692
- Les Divers Caractères des ouvrages historiques, avec le plan d'une nouvelle histoire de la ville de Lyon, Paris, J. Colombat, 1694
- La Philosophie des images énigmatiques, où il est amplement traité des énigmes, hiéroglyphiques, oracles, prophéties, sorts, divinations, loteries, talismans, songes…, Lyon, Jaques Lions, 1694
- Histoire civile ou consulaire de la ville de Lyon, justifiée par chartres, titres, chroniques, manuscrits, autheurs anciens & modernes, & autres preuves, avec la carte de la ville, comme elle étoit il y a environ deux siécles, Lyon, Jean-Baptiste & Nicolas de Ville, 1696
- La Nouvelle méthode raisonnée du blason, pour l'apprendre d'une manière aisée, réduite en leçons par demandes et par réponses, Lyon, Amaulry, 1696
- Décorations faites dans la ville de Grenoble, pour la réception de Mgr le duc de Bourgogne et de Mgr le duc de Berry, avec des réflexions et des remarques sur la pratique et les usages des décorations, Grenoble, A. Fremon, 1701 Online text
- Médaille présentée au Roi le jour de la fête de Saint Loüis l'an 1703, la LXIVe de son âge, s. l., 1703
- Bibliothèque curieuse et instructive des divers ouvrages anciens et modernes de littérature et des arts, Paris, Trevoux, 1704
