= Joseph Pletz =

Austrian doctor of theology

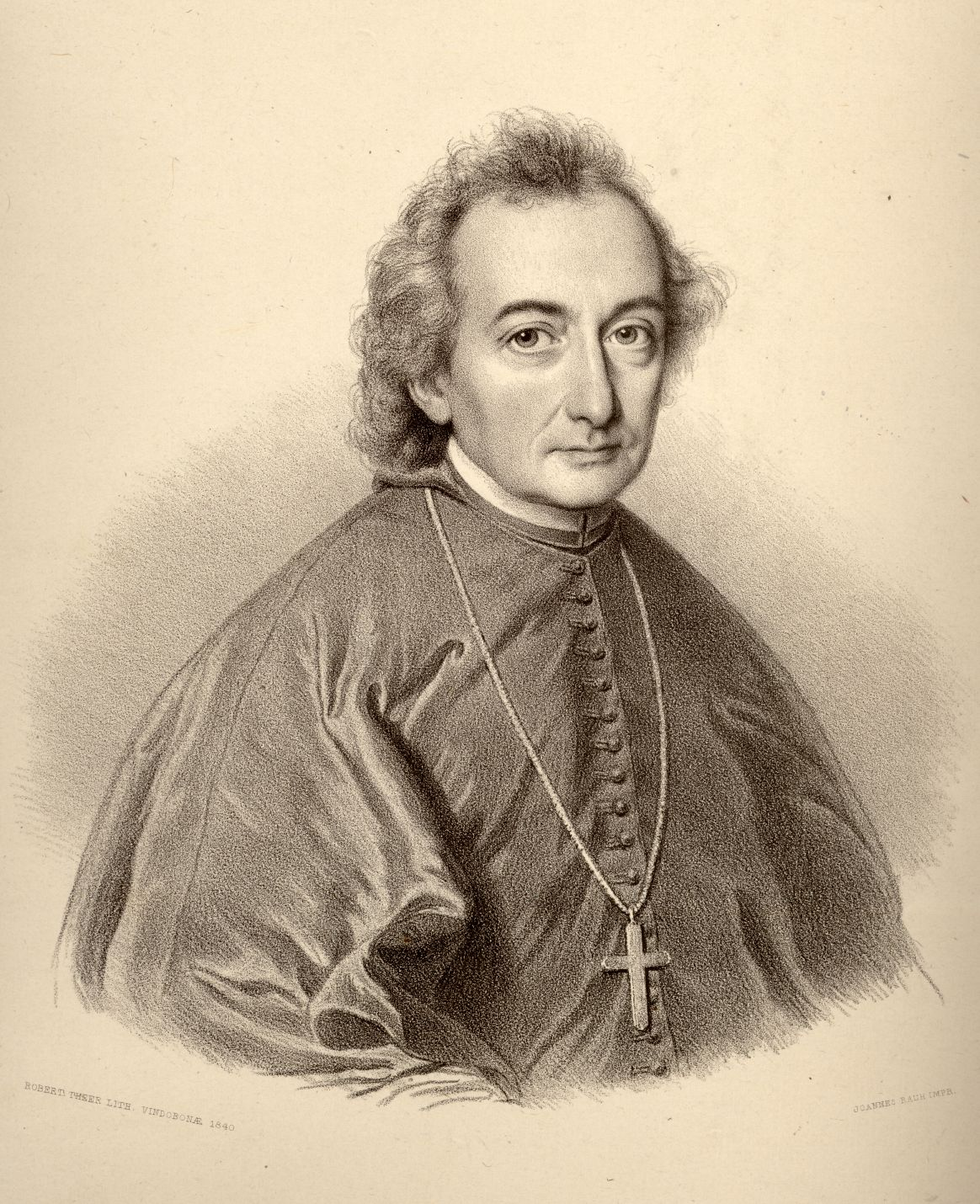
- Born: 3 January 1788; Vienna
- Died: 1841; Vienna
- Education: University of Vienna
- Occupations: Librarian, Catholic priest, theologian
- Employer: University of Vienna

Joseph Pletz (January 3, 1788 – 1841) was an Austrian doctor of theology, imperial chaplain, and abbot of the monastery of the Holy Virgin of Pagrany, Hungary; imperial counselor, consistorial counselor, deacon-emeritus of the metropolitan chapter of St. Stephen at Vienna; director of the theological studies in the Austrian empire, referent of the same assistant of the imperial commission of studies, director and president of the theological faculty; and, in 1835, ex-rector magnificus of the University of Vienna, member of the high schools of Vienna, Pesth, and Padua, etc.

Pletz was born at Vienna Jan. 3, 1788; attended the lessons of the gymnasium of St. Anna; studied philosophy and theology at the University of Vienna; received orders Aug. 30, 1812, and was appointed adjunct at the university, prefect of the studies, and librarian in the episcopal seminary. During the years 1814 and 1815 he taught dogmatics at the High School of Vienna. In 1816 he was appointed chaplain of the court, and first director of the studies at the institute for the education of secular priests, then recently founded by Francis I. In 1823 he was called upon to teach dogmatics at the University of Vienna, and Feb. 15. 1827, he became canon of the metropolitan chapter of St. Stephen. He received successively the functions and dignities mentioned above, and discharged the duties thereof with active zeal, commendable prudence, with disinterestedness and conscientiousness, for the good of the State and the Church. A fit of apoplexy put an end to his restless activity, in 1841.

Pletz was a worthy, unblemished priest, a learned theologian, a zealous protector of true science, and at the same time a father to the poor, a consoler of the afflicted, a helper in need, and to his friends a true and upright friend. Besides several works of edification and some sermons, which he published in the years 1817–1833, he wrote a number of essays in Frint's theological journal, and in his own, which he edited from 1828 to 1840 under the title of Neue theoloyische Zeitschrift (Vienna), in twelve annual volumes; the thirteenth, commenced by Pletz, was completed by his friend, Prof. Seebach.

This article incorporates public domain material from McClintock, John; Strong, James (1867–1887). Cyclopædia of Biblical, Theological and Ecclesiastical Literature. Harper and Brothers.
