= Scévole de Sainte-Marthe (1536–1623) =

French poet

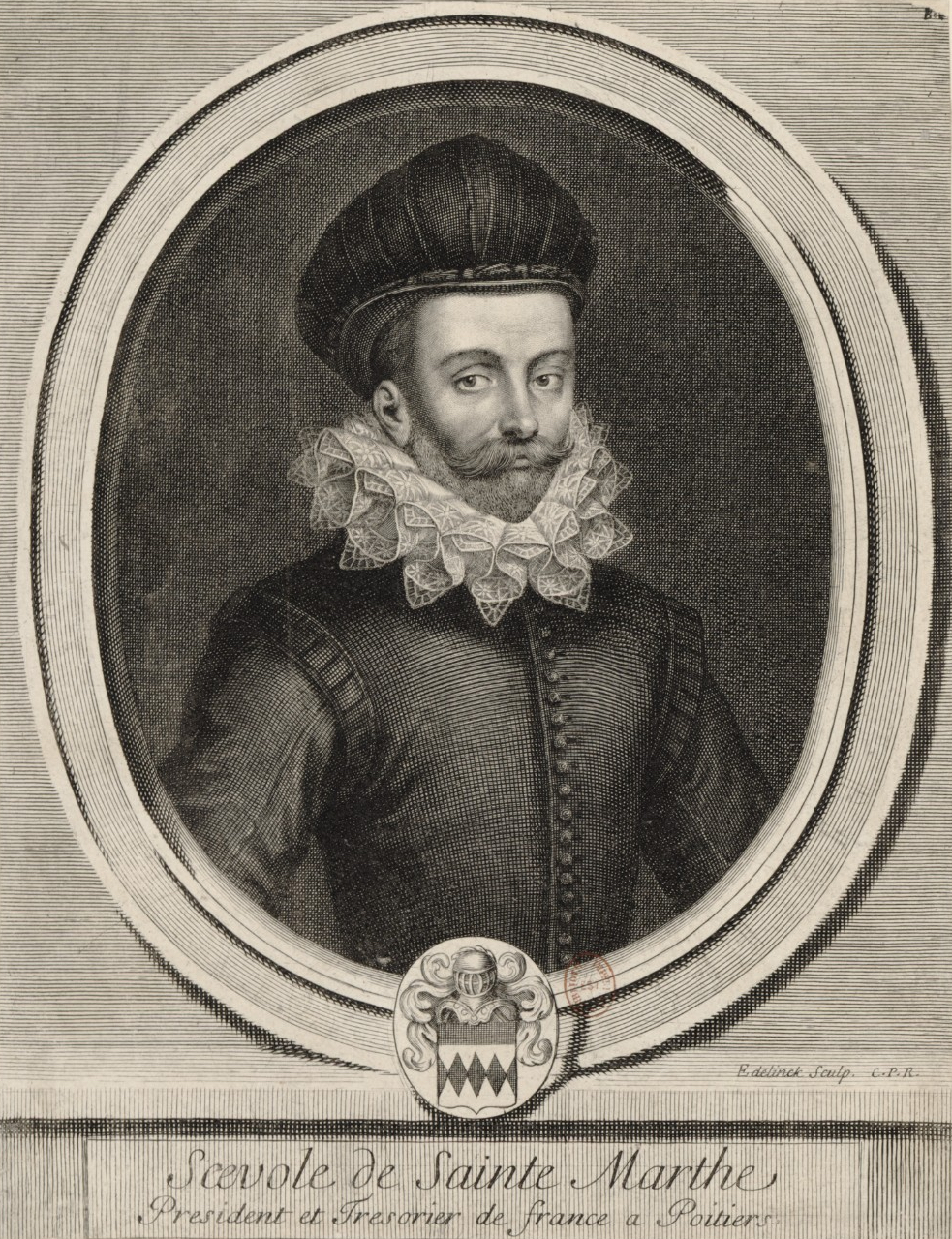
- Portrait of Scévole de Sainte-Marthe
- Born: 2 February 1536; Loudun, Poitou, France
- Died: 29 March 1623 (aged 87); Loudun, Poitou, France
- Occupations: poet, politician, writer
- Children: Scévole de Sainte-Marthe (1571–1650)
- Writing career
- Language: French, Latin

Scévole de Sainte-Marthe (2 February 1536 – 29 March 1623) was a French poet, born in Loudun.

== Publications ==
- Les Œuvres
- Larmes à la mémoire du très chrétien roi de France et de Pologne
- Scaevolae Sammarthini Poemata et Elogia Collecta nunc in unum corpus, & ab auctore partim aucta, partim recognita
- La Manière de nourrir les enfants à la mamelle
- Éloges des hommes illustres, qui depuis un siècle ont fleuri en France dans la profession des Lettres
