= Gallia Christiana =

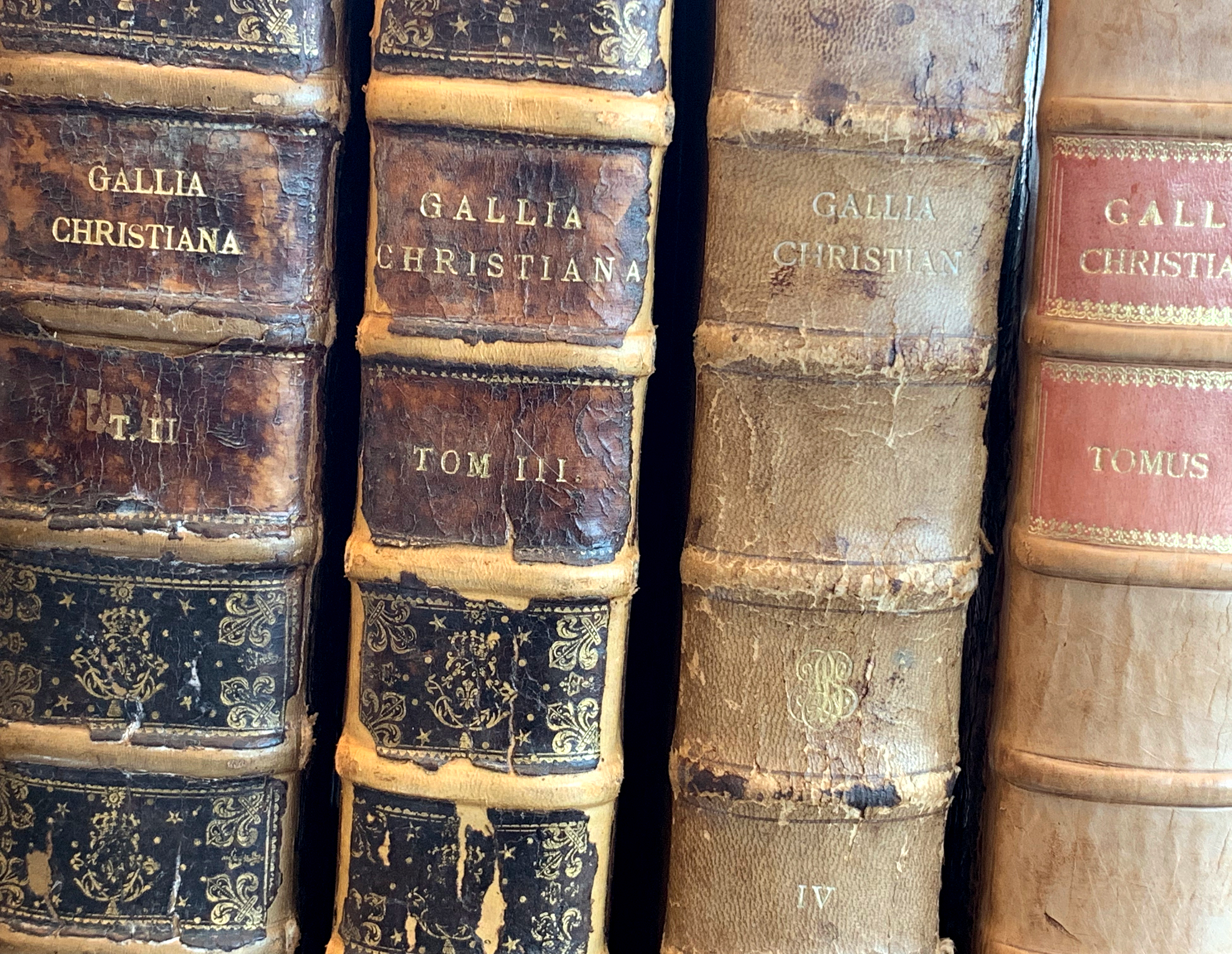
An edition of Gallia Christiana in the Bibliothèque municipale de Lyon

The Gallia Christiana, a type of work of which there have been several editions, is a documentary catalogue or list, with brief historical notices, of all the Catholic dioceses and abbeys of France from the earliest times, also of their occupants.

== First efforts ==
In 1621, Jean Chenu, an avocat at the Parlement of Paris, published Archiepiscoporum et episcoporum Galliæ chronologica historia. Nearly a third of the bishops are missing, and the episcopal succession as given by Chenu was very incomplete.

In 1626, Claude Robert, a priest of Langres, published with the approbation of André Fremiot, Archbishop of Bourges, a Gallia Christiana. He entered a large number of churches outside of Gaul, and gave a short history of the metropolitan sees, cathedrals, and abbeys.

== The Sammarthani ==
Two brothers, Scévole and Louis de Sainte-Marthe, appointed royal historiographers of France in 1620, had assisted Chenu and Robert. At the assembly of the French Clergy in 1626, a number of prelates commissioned these brothers to compile a more definitive work. They died before the completion of their work, and it was issued in 1656 by Scévole's sons, Pierre de Sainte-Marthe (1618–90), himself historiographer of France, Abel-Louis de Sainte-Marthe (1620–71), theologian, and later general of the Oratory, and Nicolas-Charles de Sainte-Marthe (1623–62), prior of Claunay.

On 13 September 1656, the Sainte-Marthe brothers were presented to the assembly of the French Clergy, who accepted the dedication of the work on condition that a passage suspected of Jansenism be suppressed. The work formed four volumes in folio, the first for the archdioceses, the second and third for the dioceses, and the fourth for the abbeys, all in alphabetical order. It reproduced a large number of manuscripts. Defects and omissions, however, were obvious. The Sainte-Marthe brothers themselves announced in their preface the early appearance of a second edition corrected and enlarged.

As early as 1660, the Jesuit Jean Colomb published at Lyons the Noctes Blancalandanæ, which contains certain additions to the work of the Sammarthani, as the brothers and their successors are often called. "The name of Sainte-Marthe", wrote Voltaire, "is one of those of which the country has most reason to be proud." The edition promised by the Sainte-Marthe brothers did not appear.

== Revision by the Maurists ==
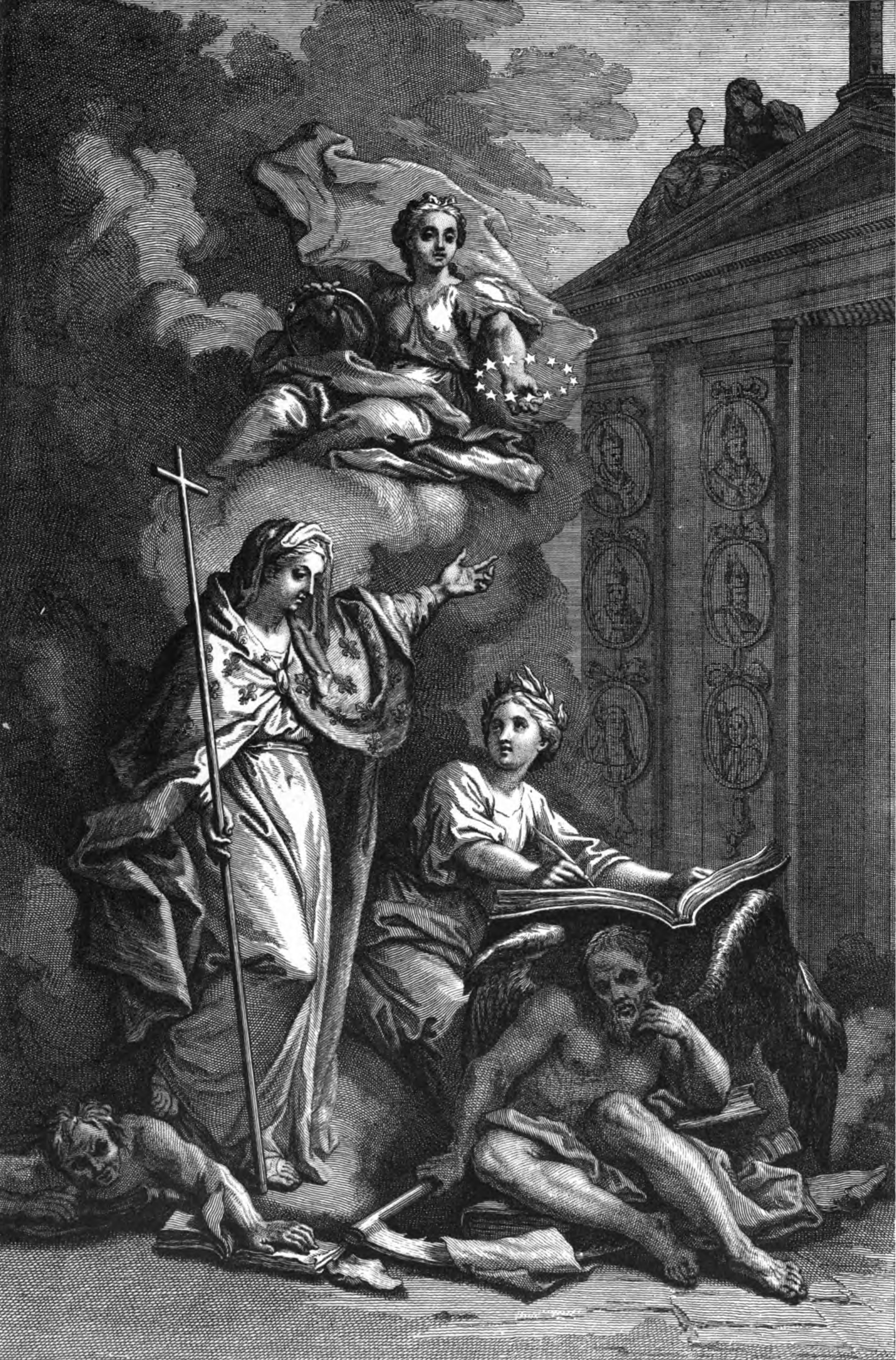
An illustration from de Sainte-Marthe's 1715 edition of the Gallia Christiana

In 1710, the Assembly of the French Clergy offered four thousand livres to Denys de Sainte-Marthe (1650–1725), a Benedictine monk of the Congregation of Saint-Maur renowned for his polemics against the Trappist Armand Jean le Bouthillier de Rancé on the subject of monastic studies, on condition that he should bring the revision of the Gallia Christiana to a successful conclusion. The Assembly required that the first volume should appear at the end of four years, and that de Sainte-Marthe's congregation should continue the undertaking after his death. Through de Sainte-Marthe's efforts, the first volume appeared in 1715, devoted to the ecclesiastical provinces of Albi, Aix, Arles, Avignon, and Auch. In 1720, de Sainte-Marthe produced the second volume dealing with the provinces of Bourges and Bordeaux; and in 1725 the third, which treated Cambrai, Cologne, and Embrun.

After de Sainte-Marthe's death, the Benedictines issued the fourth volume (1728) on Lyons, and the fifth volume (1731) on Mechelen and Mainz. Félix Hodin and Etienne Brice, who were preparing the latter volumes of the Gallia Christiana, were expelled from Saint-Germain-des-Prés between 1731 and 1740, on account of the controversies over the bull Unigenitus. They returned to Paris in 1739 and issued the sixth volume, dealing with Narbonne, also (1744) the seventh and eighth volumes on Paris and its suffragan sees.

Michel Toussaint Chrétien Duplessis united his efforts with Hodin and Brice, and the ninth and tenth volumes, both on the province of Reims, appeared in 1751. The eleventh volume (1759), dealing with the province of Rouen, was issued by Pierre Henri and Jacques Taschereau. In 1770, the twelfth volume, on the province of Sens and province of Tarentaise, appeared, and in 1785 the thirteenth, on the provinces of Toulouse and Trier.

At the outbreak of the revolution, four volumes were lacking: Tours, Besançon, Utrecht, and Vienne. Barthélemy Hauréau published (in 1856, 1860 and 1865), for the provinces of Tours, Besançon and Vienne, respectively, and according to the Benedictine method, the fourteenth, fifteenth and sixteenth volumes of the Gallia Christiana.

The province of Utrecht alone has no place in this great collection, but this defect has been remedied in part by the Bullarium Trajectense, edited by Gisbert Brom, and extending from the earliest times to 1378 (The Hague, 1891–96).

Volumes I to V and XI to XIII of the new Gallia Christiana were reprinted by Léon-Paul Piolin between 1870 and 1877, and volumes VI to IX and XII by the publisher H. Welter. The new edition places after each metropolitan see its suffragan sees, and after each see the abbeys belonging to it. The original documents, instead of encumbering the body of the articles, are inserted at the end of each diocese under in a section titled Instrumenta.

== Later works ==
In 1774, Hugues Du Tems, vicar-general of Bordeaux, undertook an abridgement of the Gallia under the title Le clergé de France. Only four volumes appeared, out of a planned seven.

About 1867 Honoré Fisquet undertook the publication of an episcopal history of France (La France Pontificale), in which, for the early period, he utilized the Gallia, at the same time bringing the history of each diocese down to modern times. Twenty-two volumes appeared.

Joseph-Hyacinthe Albanès projected a complete revision of the Gallia Christiana, each ecclesiastical province to form a volume. Albanès, who was one of the first scholars to search the Lateran and Vatican libraries, in his efforts to determine the initial years of some episcopal reigns, found occasionally either the acts of election or the Bulls of provision. He hoped in this way to remove certain suppositious bishops who had been introduced to fill gaps in the catalogues, but died in 1897 before the first volume appeared. Through the use of his notes and the efforts of Ulysse Chevalier three addition volumes of this Gallia Christiana (novissima), treating Arles, Aix, and Marseilles, appeared at Montbéliard.

== See also ==
- Catholic Church in France
- Jean-Barthélemy Hauréau
- España Sagrada
- Italia Sacra

== Bibliography ==
- Jean-François Dreux du Radier, Bibliothèque historique et critique du Poitou (Paris, 1754)
- Gallia Christiana, Vol. IV, Préface
- Gallia Christiana (novissima) (Montbéliard, 1899), Préface to the Aix volume
- Paul de Longuemare, Une famille d'auteurs aux seizième, dix-septième et dix-huitième siècles; les Sainte-Marthe (Paris, 1902)
- Victor Fouque, Du "Gallia christiana" et de ses auteurs: étude bibliographique, Paris: E. Tross, 1857. Available on the Bibliothèque nationale's Gallica site.
