= Trudpert Neugart =

Trudpert Neugart (born Villingen, Baden, 23 February 1742; died at St Paul's Benedictine abbey near Klagenfurt, Carinthia, Austria, 15 December 1825) was a Benedictine historian. Of middle-class origin, Neugart studied in the classical schools of the Benedictine abbeys of St George and St. Blasien, entered the order at the latter monastery in 1759, and was ordained priest 1765; in 1767 he was appointed professor of biblical languages at the University of Freiburg. In 1770, however, he returned to St. Blasien where he professed theology.

While engaged in this work he published a treatise on penance, Doctrina de sacramento poenitentiae recte administrando (St Blasien, 1778). His abbot, Gerbert had planned the publication of a Church history of Germany on a large scale (Germania sacra). In 1780 at his request Neugart began an elaborate research into the history of the Diocese of Constance. On Gerbert's death in 1793, Neugart declined the title of abbot but accepted the provostship of Bad Krozingen, near Freiburg, so as to be able to devote himself entirely to historical studies. He published the original charters and documents for the history of the Diocese of Constance in a separate publication, Codex diplomaticus Alemanniae et Burgundiae transjuranae intra fines dioecesis Constantiensis (I, St. Blasien, 1791; II, St. Blansien, 1795). With this as a basis he wrote in Krozingen the first instalment of his history of the Diocese of Constance Episcopatus Constantiensis Alemannicus sub metropoli Moguntina (part I, vol. I, to the year 1100, St. Blasien 1803).

Soon the abbey of St. Blasien was secularized. Notwithstanding Neugart's efforts for its preservation it was assigned to Baden, and absorbed with all its landed possessions. In 1807 Neugart went to Vienna to negotiate for the settlement of the expelled monks in Austria, and succeeded. The abbot and monks of St. Blasien were granted the Abbey of St. Paul, near Klagenfurt in the valley of the Lavant, suppressed by Joseph II. Here Neugart completed the second volume of his diocesan history extending to 1308, but it was not published until 1802. He then turned his attention to the history of Carinthia and of the Abbey of St. Paul, where he and his companions had found refuge. After his death there appeared his Historia monasterii Ord. S. Benedicti ad S. Paulum in valle inferioris Carinthiae Lavantina (Klagenfurt, 1848,1854). Several historical treatises and compilations are still in manuscript. Another work, Libellus majores maternos Rudolphi I regis exhibens, was edited by Weber (Klagenfurt, 1850).
