= Scévole de Sainte-Marthe (1571–1650) =

French historian

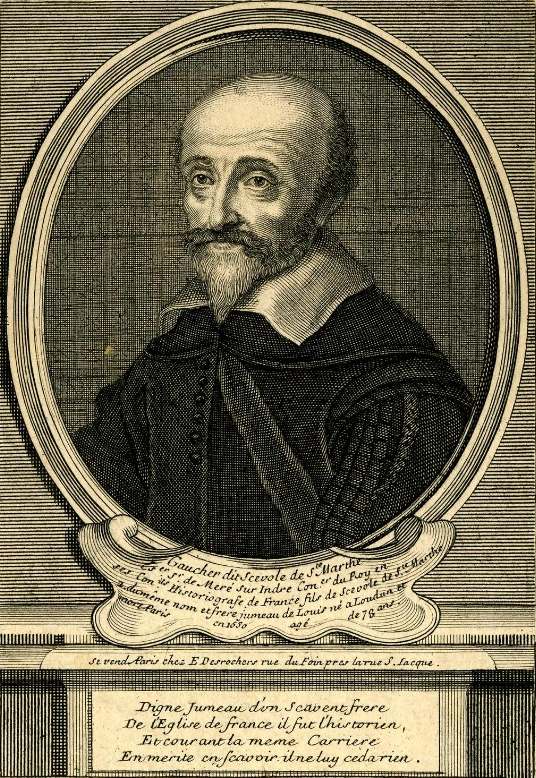
- Born: 20 December 1571 Loudun, Poitou, France
- Died: 7 September 1650 (aged 78) Loudun, Nouvelle-Aquitaine, France
- Occupation: historian
- Language: French
- Parents: Scévole de Sainte-Marthe (1536–1623)

Scévole de Sainte-Marthe (20 December 1571, Loudun – 7 September 1650) was a French historian. He studied at the University of Poitiers.

== Publications ==
- Histoire généalogique de la Maison de France
- Histoire généalogique de la maison de La Trémoïlle
