= List of collections of Crusader sources =

The list of collections of Crusader sources provides those collections of original sources for the Crusades from the 17th century through the 20th century. These include collections, regesta and bibliotheca, and provide valuable insight into the historiography of the Crusades though the identification of the various editions and translations of the sources, as well as commentary on these sources. Beginning in the 16th century, Crusader historiography included the collection, editing and interpretation of original texts. This was supplemented by the collection of major secular and religious documents. Where appropriate, the abbreviations commonly used in modern histories of the Crusades are identified. Editors are referenced, where available, to the various national collection of biographies and collections linked to the digital libraries of the University of Michigan's HathiTrust and OCLC's WorldCat.

== Principal collections of narrative sources ==
The principal collections of narrative sources for the Crusades referenced in modern Crusader histories are catalogued as Chronicles and Histories, Travelogues and Geography, and Bibliographies. They include the following.

=== Recueil des historiens des croisades (RHC) ===
The premier collections of original Crusader sources are the Recueil des historiens des croisades (Collection of the Historians of the Crusades) and its predecessor Gesta Dei per Francos. The influential work Recueil des historiens des croisades is in 16 volumes, Publ. Académie des Inscriptions et Belles Lettres, Paris (1841–1906). RHC is the definitive collection of original Crusader sources from Western, Greek, Arabic, Armenian and Syrian authors. The volumes are organized into five series covering legal documents and Western, Arabic, Byzantine and Armenian/Syrian works.

- Recueil des historiens des croisades lois (RHC Lois). Assises de Jérusalem ou Recueil des ouvrages de jurisprudence composés pendant le XIIIe siècle dans les royaumes de Jérusalem et de Chypre, 2 volumes, Paris (1841–1843). Edited by French historian and statesman Auguste-Arthur Beugnot (1797–1865). A treatise on the Assizes of Jerusalem, the legal documents of the Kingdom of Jerusalem. Includes works of historian Philip of Novara (1200–1270), jurist John of Ibelin (1215–1266), Count of Jaffa and Ascalon, and the Lignages d'Outremer.
- Recueil des historiens des croisades historiens occidentaux (RHC Oc.), 5 volumes, Paris (1844–1895). Includes the work of William of Tyre and continuations; the 12 original Latin Chronicles of the First Crusade; other contemporaneous works on the First Crusade; and documents related to the Knights Hospitaller.
- Recueil des historiens des croisades historiens orientaux (RHC Or.), 5 volumes, Paris (1872–1906). Includes extracts from The Complete History of Arab/Kurdish historian Ali ibn al-Athir (1160–1233), The Book of the Two Gardens by Arab historian Abu Shama (1203–1268), al-Rihlah (The Voyage) by Arab geographer Ibn Jubayr (1145–1217), and a biography of Saladin by Abu'l-Mahāsin Yūsuf (1411–1469).
- Recueil des historiens des croisades historiens grecs (RHC Gr.), 2 volumes, Paris (1875–1881). Edited by French Hellenist Carl B. Hase (1780–1864). Includes The Alexiad by Anna Komnene (1083–1153)
- Recueil des historiens des croisades documents arméniens (RHC Ar.), 2 volumes, Paris (1869–1906). Includes the Chronicle of Matthew of Edessa (second half of 11th century–1144), the Chronicle of Michael the Syrian (1126–1199) and Les Gestes des Chiprois.

Gesta Dei per Francos (God's Work through the Franks, GDF), 2 volumes, Hannau (1611), is the precursor to Recueil des historiens des croisades. Gesta Dei per Francos [sive orientalist expedition et regain Francorum Hiersolymitani bistoria a varies sed lilies Levi scriptoriums litters commendata] was edited by French scholar and diplomat Jacques Bongars (1554–1612). Early collection of original sources for the Crusades. The compendium, dedicated to Louis XIII of France, includes most of the main narrative sources for the First Crusade and Fifth Crusade, as well as Historia Rerum in Partibus Transmarinis Gestarum of William of Tyre, Secretorum Fidelium Crucis of Marino Sanudo and De recuperatione Terre Sancte of Pierre Dubois.

=== Other chronicles and histories ===
- Archives de l'Orient Latin (AOL), 2 volumes, Société de l'Orient Latin, Paris (1881–1884). A collection of Crusader sources of itineraries, chronicles, letters and charters, continued by Revue de l'Orient Latin.
- Chronicles of the Reigns of Stephen, Henry II and Richard I, 4 volumes, London (1885–1890), Rolls Series. Edited by English historian Richard Howlett (1841–1917). Collected English chronicles concerning the kings of England from 1135–1199, including those by William of Newburgh, Robert of Torigni, Richard of Devizes, Richard, Prior of Hexiam, and others.
- Chronicon Hierosolymitanum, id est, De bello sacro historia, exposita libris XII & nunc primum in lucem edita, 1 volume, Frankfurt (1584). Edited by German historian Reinier Reineck (1541–1595), with commentary by German philologist and historian Matthäus Dresser (1536–1607). Collection of original Crusader sources, including the works of Albert of Aachen. (cf. German Wikipedia, Reiner Reineccius, Matthäus Dresser)
- Collection des mémoires relatifs à l'histoire de France, 31 volumes, Paris (1823–1835). Edited by French historian François Guizot (1787–1874). A collection of original documents on the history of France from the founding of the French monarchy until the 13th century, with an introduction, supplements, notices and notes. Includes numerous translation of original sources, including William of Tyre and Albert of Aachen.
- Corpus Scriptorum Christianorum Orientalium (CSCO), 600+ volumes, Paris (1903 ff.). Publication and editing led by Syriac scholar Jean-Baptiste Chabot (1860–1948), supported by French orientalist Bernard Carra de Vaux (1867–1953), Chaldean priest and orientalist Louis Cheikho (1859–1927), Italian orientalist Ignazio Guidi (1844–1935) and Franco-American Coptologist Henri Hyvernat (1858–1941). A collection of Eastern Christian texts in Syriac, Arabic, Coptic, Ethopic, Armenian and Georgian.
- Deutschlands Geschichtsquellen im mittelalter bis zur mitte des dreizehnten jahrhunderts, 2 volumes, Berlin (1858). Edited by German historian Wilhelm Wattenbach (1819–1897). Germany's historical sources from the Middle Ages to the middle of the 13th century.
- Documents relatifs à l'histoire des croisades (DHR Cr), 22 volumes, Paris (1946 ff.). French collection of documents on the history of the Crusades. (cf. German Wikipedia, Documents relatifs à l'histoire des croisades)
- The Eclipse of the Abbasid Caliphate: Original Chronicles of the Fourth Islamic Century, 7 volumes, Oxford (1920–1921). Edited by British orientalists David S. Margoliouth (1858–1940) and Henry P. Amedroz (1854–1917). Includes the Book of Viziers of Hilal al-Sabi', Tajárib al-Umam by Miskawayh and the Damascus Chronicles of ibn al-Qalanisi.
- Extraits des Historiens Arabes, 1 volume, Paris (1829). Edited by French orientalist Joseph T. Reinaud (1795–1867). Extracts by Arab authors as they relate to the Crusades. Published in Michaud's Bibliothèque des Croisades.
- Histoire de l'île de Chypre sous le règne des princes de la maison de Lusignan, 3 volumes, Paris (1852–1861). Edited by French historian Louis de Mas Latrie (1815–1897). History (Histore, Volume I) and documents (Documents, Volumes II, III) on the history of Cyprus from the reign of the House of Lusignan. Supplemented by Nouvelles Preuves del'Historie de Chypre.
- Histoire littéraire de la France, 46 volumes, Paris (1733–1892). Begun by French Benedictine monk Antoine Rivet de La Grange (1683–1749), known as Dom Rivet, and the Maurists. A collection of the literature of France. Of most interest to the Crusades is Tome VIII which includes a biography of Godfrey of Bouillon and works by Raymond of Aguilers and Peter Tudebode.
- Les Gestes des Chiprois, 1 volume, Geneva (1887). Edited by French historian and philologist Gaston Raynaud (1850–1911). A history of the Crusades in three parts by an anonymous author, Italian historian Philip of Novara (1200–1270), and Gérard de Monréal, secretary to Guillaume de Beaujeu, Grand Master of the Knights Templar.
- Les Sources de l'Histoire de France (des origines aux guerres d'Italie, 1494), 6 volumes, Paris (1901–1906). Edited by French palaeographer and historian Auguste Molinier (1851–1904). The sources of the history of France from the origins to the wars in Italy (1494).
- Medieval Library (Biblioteca Graeca Medii Aevi), 7 volumes, Venice-Paris (1872–1894). Edited by Greek historian Constantine N. Sathas (1842–1914). Collection of Greek, Byzantine and post-Byzantine works, including works by Michael Attaliates, Niketas Choniates, Theodoros Metochites, Leontios Machairas, Kaisarios Dapontes, Anastasios Gordios, Michael Psellos, and lists of martyrs, catalogs and mixed writings from Jerusalem, Cyprus and Crete.
- Mélanges pour servir à l'Histoire de l'Orient Latin et des Croisades, 1 volume, Paris (1906). Compiled by French archivist Charles A. Kohler (1854–1917), Director of the Revue de l'Orient Latin (ROL). Selected articles extracted from ROL Tomes IV, V, VI, VII, VIII, IX and X.
- Monumenta Germaniae Historica (MGH), Hanover (1826). Edited by German historians Georg H. Pertz (1795–1876), Georg Waitz (1813–1886), Theodor Mommsen (1817–1903) and others. Comprehensive set of chronicle and archival sources for German history from the end of the Roman Empire until 1500.
- Nouvelles Preuves del'Historie de Chypre, 3 works, Paris (1871–1874). Edited by French historian Louis de Mas Latrie (1815–1897). Newly discovered documents on the history of Cyprus. In Volumes XXXII, XXXIV and XXXV of Bibliothèque de l'Ecole des Chartres (BEC). Supplement to Mas Latrie's Histoire de l'île de Chypre.
- Patrologia Graeco-Latina (MPG), 161 volumes, Paris (1857–1866). Edited by French priest Jacques P. Migne (1800–1875) and updated by Italian theologian Ferdinand Cavallera (1875–1954). Writing of the Church fathers and other secular writers in Greek from the 3rd century to the 15th century. Volume 131 contains Anna Komnene's Alexiad. Part of Migne's Patrologiae Cursus Completus.
- Patrologia Latina (MPL), 221 volumes, Paris (1844–1855). Edited by Jacques P. Migne. Writing of the Church fathers and other ecclesiastical writers from 230–1216. Part of Migne's Patrologiae Cursus Completus. Volume 155 is of particular interest to the Crusades, with biographical material on Godfrey of Bouillon, original texts, and other documents on the kingdom through 1250.
- Patrologia Orientalis (PO), 49 volumes, Paris (1907, ongoing). Edited by French Syriacists François Nau (1864–1931) and René Graffin (1858–1941). A collection of medieval writings through the 15th century of eastern Church Fathers in Syriac, Armenian, Arabic, Coptic, Ethopic and Georgian. (cf. French Wikipedia, René Graffin)
- Quellen zur Geschichte des Kreuzzüges Kaiser Friedrichs I, 1 volume, Berlin, (1928). Edited by German historian Anton Chroust (1864–1945). Sources on the history of Frederick I on the Third Crusade. Includes Historia de expeditione Friderici imperatoris, Historia Peregrinorum and Epistola de morte Friderici imperatoris. (cf. German Wikipedia, Anton Chroust)
- Quinti Belli sacri scriptores minores, Société de l'Orient Latin Série Historique II, Geneva (1879). Edited by German historian Reinhold Röhricht (1842–1905). Six minor works primarily concerning the Fifth Crusade. Continued by the author's Testimonia minora de quinto bello sacro. Also referred to as Scriptores Minores Quinti Belli sacri (SMQBS).
- Rawżat aṣ-ṣafāʾ fī sīrat al-anbiyāʾ w-al-mulūk w-al-khulafā (The Gardens of purity in the biography of the prophets and kings and caliph), 7 volumes with geographic index (1497). Edited by Mīr-Khvānd (1433–1498), an Uzbek Persian-language historian. A history of Islam from its origins until the late 15th century. Uses over forty major Arabic and Persian histories.
- Recueil des historiens des Gaules et de la France (RHF), 22 volumes (new edition, 24 volumes), Paris (1738–1876). Edited by French Benedictine monk and Maurist historian Martin Bouquet (1685–1754), et al. A collection of histories of France by Gaulian and French authors. (cf. French Wikipedia, Recueil des historiens des Gaules et de la France)
- Rerum britannicarum medii aevi scriptores (Rolls Series), 253 volumes, London (1858–1911). Begun by British archivists John Romilly (1802–1874), Joseph Stevenson (1806–1895) and Thomas D. Hardy (1804–1878). A collection of British and Irish medieval chronicles, archival records, legal tracts, folklore and hagiographical materials.
- Rerum Italicarum scriptores (RISc), 25 volumes in 28, Venice (1723–1751). Begun by Italian historian Ludovico A. Muratori (1672–1750). A collection of documents and sources on Italian history from the 6th century to the 15th century. Also known as RISc I Serie. (cf. Italian Wikipedia, Rerum Italicarum scriptores)
- Revue de l'Orient Latin (ROL), 12 volumes, Geneva (1893–1911). Official journal of Société de l'Orient Latin founded by French historian Paul E. D. Riant (1836–1888). Later directed by archivist Charles A. Kohler (1854–1917). A continuation of Archives de l'Orient Latin that includes Crusader sources of itineraries, chronicles, letters and charters. (cf. French Wikipédia, Paul Riant)
- Testimonia minora de quinto bello sacro, 1 volume, Société de l'Orient Latin, Série Historique III, Geneva (1882). Edited by German historian Reinhold Röhricht (1842–1905). A continuation of his Quinti Belli sacri scriptores minores, providing some 233 lesser-known excerpts of contemporaneous authors concerning the Fifth Crusade.
- Translations and Reprints from the Original Sources of European History, 6 volumes, Philadelphia (1894–1900). A collection of works including letters, charters and histories relating to the Crusades. Includes: Volume 1.II, Urban and the Crusaders, Volume 1.IV, Letters of the Crusaders and Volume 3.I, the Fourth Crusade, edited by Dana Carleton Munro (1866–1933).

=== Correspondence and charters ===
- Cartulaire général de l'Ordre des Hospitaliers (Cart), 4 volumes, Paris (1894–1904). Edited by French historian Joseph Delaville Le Roulx (1855–1911). A collection of original documents on the history of the Knights Hospitaller.
- Cartulaire de l'église Du Saint Sépulcre de Jérusalem, Manuscrits du Vatican, 2 volumes, Paris (1849). Edited by French historian M. Eugène de Rozière (1820–1886). Provides the cartularies of the Church of the Holy Sepulcher of Jerusalem in support of the Canons Regular of the Holy Sepulchre. Update edited by Geneviève Bresc-Bautier in DHR Cr 15 (Paris, 1984). (cf. French Wikipedia, Eugène de Rozière)
- Catalogue of the records of the Order of St. John of Jerusalem in the Royal Malta Library, 13 volumes, Valletta (1964). Compiled by A. Zammit Gabarretta and J. Mizzi. A compilation of official records of the Knights Hospitaller in Malta.
- Die Kreuzzugsbriefe aus den Jahren, 1088–1100 (DK), University of Heidelberg, (1898). Edited by German historian Heinrich Hagenmeyer (1834–1915). Letters of the Crusades from 1088–1100. (cf. German Wikipedia, Heinrich Hagenmeyer)
- Historia Diplomatica Friderici Secondi, 6 volumes, Paris (1852–1861). Edited by French archaeologist and historian Jean Louis Alphonse Huillard-Bréholles (1817–1871). A collection of documents of the reign of Frederick II, Holy Roman Emperor. Hullard-Bréholles also updated Michaud's Histoire des Croisades (Paris, 1882).
- Historiae Patriae Monumenta (HMP) (Italian) or Monumenta historiae patria (French), 22 volumes, Turin (1836–1898). Originally created in 1833 by Regia Deputazione sopra gli studi di Storia Patria at the direction of Carlo Alberto di Savoia. A collection of Italian historical sources, charters, legal, chronicles, including ones from the Kingdom of Sardinia. (cf. Italian Wikipedia, Historiae Patriae Monumenta [includes list of volumes])
- Histoire des Croisades, 6 volumes (Paris, 1812–1822). Edited by French historian Joseph Fr. Michaud (1767–1839), updated by Jean L. A. Huillard-Bréholles (Paris, 1862). A history of the Crusades that includes 40 appendices with original sources materials, primarily contemporary letters. Michaud also wrote Bibliothèque des Croisades.
- Inventaire critique des Lettres historiques des Croisades, 2 volumes, Paris (1881). Edited by French historian Paul E. D. Riant (1836–1888) from the Archives de l'Orient Latin. Two volumes of letters pertaining to Jerusalem from religious and royal authorities. The first volume covers the period 768–1093 and includes the Greek Orthodox Patriarchs of Jerusalem. The second period cover the period of 1094–1100, focusing on the First Crusade.
- La règle du Temple, 1 volume, Paris (1886). Edited by French historian Henri de Curzon (1861–1942). The rules of the Order of the Temple, directly inspired by those of Bernard of Clairvaux (1090–1153) that were established after the Council of Troyes (1129).
- Regesta Regni Hierosolymitani, MXCVII–MCCXCI, 2 volumes plus Addendum, Innsbrück (1893–1904). Edited by German historian of the Crusades Reinhold Röhricht (1842–1905). A collection of over nine hundred charters and other royal documents issued by the Kingdom of Jerusalem from 1097–1241.
- Regesten der Kaiserurkunden des oströmischen Reiches von 565–1453, 3 volumes, Munich-Berlin (1924–1932). Edited by German theologian Franz J. Dölger (1879–1910), updated by German Byzantinist Peter Wirth (born 1931). Imperial documents of the Eastern Roman empire, 565–1453. (cf. German Wikipedia, Peter Wirth)
- Tabulae Ordinis Teutonici, 1 volume, Berlin (1869). Edited by German archivist Ernst Strehlke (1834–1869), completed posthumously by Philipp Jaffé (1819–1870). A collection of documents of the Teutonic Knights. (cf. German Wikipedia, Ernst Strehlke)
- Urkunden zur älteren Handels und Staatsgeschichte der Republik Venedig, mit besonderer Beziehung auf Byzanz und die Levante, 3 volumes, Vienna (1856–1857). Edited by German historians Gottlieb L. Tafel (1787–1860) and Georg M. Thomas (1817–1887). A collection of commercial and government documents of the Republic of Venice with regard to the Byzantine empire and the Holy Land. (cf. German Wikipedia, Gottlied Lukas Friedrich Tafel, Georg Martin Thomas)

=== Travelogues and geography ===
- Biblioteca Bio-bibliografica della Terra Santa e dell' Orient Francescano (BOF), 14 volumes, Florence (1906–1927). Edited by Italian-Croatian Franciscan friar Girolamo Golubovich (1865–1941). A series of biographical and bibliographic volumes on Franciscans in the Holy Land from 1215–1332.
- Bibliothèque archéologique et historique (Bibl. AH), 200+ volumes, Paris (1921 ff.). Published by the Institut français du Proche-Orient. A collection of titles concerning the Semitic Near East, from ancient to medieval times.
- Bibliotheca geographica Palaestinae, 1 volume, Berlin (1890). Edited by German historian of the Crusades Reinhold Röhricht (1842–1905). Subtitled Chronologisches Verzeichniss der auf die Geographie des heiligen Landes bezüglichen Literatur von 333 bis 1878 und Versuch einer Cartographie, it provides the summaries of 3515 books on the geography of the Holy Land issued between 355 and 1878.
- Descriptiones Terrae Sanctae ex saeculo VIII., IX., XII. et XV, Leipzig (1874). Edited by Swiss orientalist Titus Tobler (1806–1877). Descriptions of the Holy Land from the 8th–15th centuries, compiled and edited by T. Tobler. Accounts include Saint Willibald's from 723–726, Commemoratorium de Casis Dei vel Monasteriis, a survey of the Holy Land in 808 commissioned by Charlemagne, Bernard the Pilgrim's travels (c. 865), an anonymous account known as Innominatus VII (1145), John of Würzburg's account (1165), Innominatus VIII (1185), La Citez de Jherusalem (c. 1187), a late 12th-century French description of the holy city used in the Rothelin Continuation, and Description of the Holy Land by John Poloner (1422). With commentary by the editor.
- Documenta Lipsanographica ad I. bellum sacrum spectantia (Relics of the Holy Land), 1 volume, Paris (1844–1895). Volume 5.VII of RHC Historiens occidentaux (RHC Oc.). A collection of eleven accounts of relics of the Holy Land written from 1098–1125. Included are discussions of the translation of relics of Christ and the Virgin Mary, John the Baptist, Saints George, Nicholas, Basil and Stephen, the patriarchs at Hebron, among others.
- Exuviae Sacrae Constantinoploitanae, 3 volumes, Geneva-Paris (1877–1888, 1904). The first two volumes were edited by French historian Paul E. D. Riant (1836–1888). The third volume, La croix des premiers croisés; la sainte lance; la sainte couronne, was prepared by French historian Fernand de Mély (1851–1935). A collection of documentation of relics taken from Constantinople following the Fourth Crusade.
- Histoire de Saladin, Sulthan d'Egypte et de Syrie, 2 volumes, Paris (1758). By French journalist and censor François-Louis Claude Marin (1721–1803). A history of the Ayyubid dynasty founded by Saladin with three maps of Jerusalem and Acre. (cf. Franch Wikipedia, François-Louis Claude Marin)
- Itinera Latina, 2 volumes in SOL SG, Geneva (1879). Edited by Swiss orientalist Titus Tobler (1806–1877), French archivist Charles A. Kohler (1854–1917) and French historian Auguste Molinier (1851–1904). Latin travel accounts to the Holy Land before the First Crusade. Includes the Itinerarium of Bernard the Wise, Hodoeporicon of Saint Willibald, and Pilgrimage of Holy Paula, among others. Also referred to as Itinera Hierosolymitana et Descriptiones Terrae Sanctae bellis sacris anteriora & latina lingua exarata sumptibus.
- Itinéraires a Jérusalem et descriptions de la Terre Sainte: rédigés en français, aux XIe, XIIe and XIIIe siècles, 1 volume in SOL SG, Geneva (1882). Edited by French medievalist Henri V. Michelant (1811–1890) and French historian and philologist Gaston Raynaud (1850–1911). A collection of geographical descriptions of the Holy Land during the Crusader period, in French. (cf. French Wikipedia, Henri V. Michelant)
- Itinéraires Russes en Orient, 1 volume in SOL SG, Geneva (1889). Edited by Russian historian Sofya Petrovna Khitrovo (1846–1910), also referred to as Mme B. de Khitrowo. A collection of travel accounts to the Holy Land by Russians. The accounts are mostly from the 14th century and after, but does include the Puteshestive igumena Daniil.
- Itinerarium Hierosolymitana, 1 volume, Vienna (1866). Volume 39 of Corpus Scriptorum Eccesiasticorum Latinorum (CSEL). A collection of account of travel to the Holy Land before the First Crusade.
- Karten und Pläne zur Palästinakunde aus dem 7 bis 16 Jahrhundert, in Zeitschrift des Deutschen Palästina-Vereins, Tübingen (1892). Edited by German historian Reinhold Röhricht (1842–1905). Eight maps of the Holy Land from the 7th century through the 16th century.
- Palestine Pilgrims' Text Society, Library of, (PPTS), 13 volumes, London (1894–1905). A collection of medieval texts relating to medieval pilgrimages to the Holy Land.
- Société de l'Orient Latin, Série géographique (SOL SG), 4 volumes, Geneva (1879–1889). Under the general direction of French historian Louis de Mas Latrie (1815–1897). Volumes 1, 2: Itinera Latina, travel accounts to the Holy Land before the First Crusade; Volume 3: Itinéraires a Jérusalem et descriptions de la Terre Sainte, geographical descriptions from the 11th century to the 13th century; Volume 4: Itinéraires Russes en Orient, travel accounts of Russians to the Holy Land.
- Société de l'Orient Latin, Série historique (SOL SH), 5 volumes, Geneva (1877–1887). A collections of historical documents that includes: (i) La Prise d'Alexandre by Guillaume de Machaut; (ii) Quinti Belli sacri scriptores minores; (iii) Testimonia minora de quinto bello sacro; (iv) Chronicle of the Morea; and (v) Gestes des Chiprois.

=== Bibliographies ===
Bibliographies of the Crusades and related history and literature include the following.

- An Attempt at a Bibliography of Cyprus, 1 volume, Nicosia (1889). Edited by English historian Claude D. Cobham (1842–1915). A comprehensive bibliography of Cypriot history over 700 documents cited, supplementing the one in Cobham's Excerpta Cypria.
- Bibliotheca historica medii aevi, 2 volumes plus supplement, Berlin (1862, new edition 1896). Edited by German Historian August Potthast (1824–1898). Guide to the sources of European history and historians from 375–1500.
- Bibliothèque des Croisades, 4 volumes, Paris (1829). Edited by French historian Joseph Fr. Michaud (1767–1839), with historian and journalist Jean J. F. Poujoulat (1808–1880). A comprehensive bibliography of works related to the Crusades. Michaud also wrote Histoire des Croisades.
- Bibliothèque orientale, ou dictionnaire universel contenant tout ce qui regarde la connoissance des peuples de l'Orient, 3 volumes, Paris (1697). Edited by French orientalist Barthélemy d'Herbelot (1625–1695), completed by French orientalist and archaeologist Antoine Galland (1646 –1715). Derived from Kashf al-Zunun, it contains a large number of Arabic, Turkish and Persian compilations and manuscripts. Galland is best known for the first European translation of One Thousand and One Nights.
- Bibliographie des chansons de geste, 1 volume, Paris (1897). Edited by French literary historian Léon Gautier (1832 –1897). A bibliography of works related to chanson de geste.
- Bibliographie méthodique de l'Ordre souv de St. Jean de Jérusalem, 1 volume, Rome (1885). Edited by Austrian historian Friedrich von Hellwald (1842–1892). A complete bibliography of the documents related to the Knights Hospitaller. Includes Chronologie historique des grands-maîtres de l'Ordre de St. Jean de Jérusalem. (Paris, 1770) by French historian François Clément (1714–1793).
- Bibliographie de l'ordre des Templiers (imprimés et manuscrits), 1 volume, Paris (1929). Edited by French historian Marguerite Dessubré. Bibliography of documents related to the Knights Templar.
- Bibliographie zur Geschichte der Kreuzzüge, Hannover (1960). Edited by German historian Hans E. Mayer (born 1932). Bibliography of Crusader histories.
- Bibliography of English translations from medieval sources, 1 volume, Columbia University Records of Civilization (CURC), Volumes 39 (1946) and 88 (1943–1967), New York (1946, 1974). Compiled by Clarissa P. Farrar (1889–1963) and Austin P. Evans. Updated by Mary Anne H. Ferguson. A listing of 4000 English translations from Constantine the Great through the 16th century of works from Europe, West Asia and North Africa. (cf. German Wikipedia, Records of Civilization: Sources and Studies)
- Byzantine Sources in Translation, Internet History Sourcebooks Project, Fordham University, New York (2019). Lists of available translations of Byzantine sources in Western European languages.
- Excerpta Cypria, 1 volume, Cambridge (1908). Edited and translated by English historian Claude D. Cobham (1842–1915). Materials for a history of Cyprus, with bibliography, including travellers' reports and local informants. A more comprehensive bibliography is found in Cobham's An Attempt at a Bibliography of Cyprus.
- Geschichte des ersten Kreuzzuges (History and Literature of the Crusades), 1 volume, Düsseldorf, new edition Leipzig (1841, 1881). Edited by German historian Heinrich von Sybel (1817–1895), translated by English author Lucie, Lady Duff-Gordon (1821–1869). A history and bibliography of the Crusades through the Third Crusade.
- Kurze Bibliographie zur Geschichte des Deutschen Ordens, 1198–1561, 1 volume, Göttingen (1949). Edited by German historian Rudolph ten Haaf. An introductory bibliography of works on the Teutonic Order.
- Lexicon Bibliographicum et Encyclopaedicum Mustafa ben Abdallah, 7 volumes, London (1842). Edited by Gustavus Fleugel (fl. 1842). Latin translation of Kashf al-Zunun.
- Select Bibliography of the Crusades, 1 volume, Madison, Wisconsin (1989). Edited by Hans E. Mayer (born 1932) and Joyce McLellan. Bibliography of Crusades historiography, original sources, collections, narrative works, documents and secondary sources.
- The Crusade: Historiography and Bibliography, 1 volume, Bloomington, Indiana (1962). Edited by Egyptian Coptic historian Aziz S. Atiya (1898–1988). A bibliography of Crusader texts with an emphasis on Islamic texts. Atiya was also the original editor of the Coptic Encyclopedia.
- The Historie of the Holy Warre, Cambridge (1639). Edited by Thomas Fuller (1608–1661), an English churchman and historian. A history of the Crusades from the fall of Jerusalem under Titus in 70 AD through 1290. Includes critical commentary, a complete chronology, and bibliography.
- The Sources for the History of the Syrian Assassins, in Speculum, XXVII (1952). By British-American historian Bernard Lewis (1916–2018). A listing of source material for the Assassins.

== Ecclesiastic collections ==
=== General ecclesiastic collections ===
Major collections of Crusader, royal/imperial, and ecclesiastical sources and documents include the following.

- Acta et diplomata graeca medii aevi sacra et profana, 6 volumes, Athens (1862–1890). Edited by Slovene philologist Franz Miklosich (1813–1891) and German philologist Joseph Müller (1825–1895).
- Annales Ecclesiastici, 19 volumes, Lucca (1747–1756). Begun by Italian cardinal and historian Caesar Baronius (1538–1607), published beginning in 1588. Continued by Italian historians Odericus Raynaldus (1595–1671), Giacomo Laderchi (1678–1738) and Henri Spondanus (1568–1643). A history of the first 16 centuries of Christianity, through 1571, containing numerous original documents.
- Bibliotheca Ecclesiastica, 1 volume, Leipzig (1864). Edited by archimandrite Andronicus Demetracopoulos (1826–1872). Contains several theological works bearing on the religious disputes under Manuel I Komnenos, a comprehensive collection of the works of Eustratius of Nicaea, and those of John Phurnes, a monk opposed to the teachings of the Latin church.
- Bibliotheca Orientalis (BO), 3 volumes, Rome (1719–1728). Edited by Lebanese orientalist Giuseppe S. Assemani (1687–1768). Updated by German Lutheran theologian and orientalist August Friedrich Pfeiffer (1748–1817). The three (of four) volumes competed cover medieval Syriac, Arabic, Coptic, Ethopic, Persian and Turkish manuscripts.
- Bullarium ordanis praedicatorum (BOP), 1 volume, Rome (1727, 1740). Edited by Tomás Ripoll (1652–1747), Master of the Order of Preachers. Updated by Ripoll's successor and student Antonin Brémond (died 1755). A compilation of the important historical documents of the Dominican Order.
- Catalogus Codicum Manuscriptorum Graecorum qui in Monasterio Sanctae Catharinae in Monte Sinai Asservantur, St. Petersburg (1911). Edited by Russian historian Vladimir N. Benešević (1874–1943). Collection of manuscripts at Saint Catherine's Monastery in the Sinai, including that of the abdication of John the Oxite in 1100.
- Corpus Inscriptionum Semiticarum (CIS), 5 volumes, Paris (published through 1950). Published by the Académie des Inscriptions et Belles-Lettres.
- Corpus Scriptorum Christianorum Orientalium (CSCO), 600+ volumes, Paris (1903 ff.). Publication and editing led by Syriac scholar Jean-Baptiste Chabot (1860–1948), supported by French orientalist Bernard Carra de Vaux (1867–1953), Chaldean priest and orientalist Louis Cheikho (1859–1927), Italian orientalist Ignazio Guidi (1844–1935) and Franco-American Coptologist Henri Hyvernat (1858–1941). A collection of Eastern Christian texts in Syriac, Arabic, Coptic, Ethopic, Armenian and Georgian.
- Corpus Scriptorum Christianorum Orientalium: Scriptores Arabici (CSCO Arabici), 56 volumes, Louvain (1905 ff.). Edited by French orientalist Bernard Carra de Vaux (1867–1953) and Chaldean priest and orientalist Louis Cheikho (1859–1927), among others. A collection of Eastern Christian texts in Arabic.
- Corpus Scriptorum Christianorum Orientalium: Scriptores Armeniaci (CSCO Armeniaci), 26 volumes, Louvain (1905–2001). A collection of Eastern Christian texts in Armenian.
- Corpus Scriptorum Christianorum Orientalium: Scriptores Coptici (CSCO Coptici), 10 volumes, Paris (1906–1933). Edited by Franco-American Coptologist Henri Hyvernat (1858–1941) and German theologian Johannes Leipoldt (1880–1965). A collection of Eastern Christian texts in Coptic. (cf. German Wikipedia, Johannes Leipoldt)
- Corpus Scriptorum Christianorum Orientalium: Scriptores Syri (CSCO Syri), 182 volumes, Paris (1905 ff.). Edited by Italian orientalist Ignazio Guidi (1844–1935), among others. A collection of Eastern Christian texts in Syriac.
- Corpus Scriptorum Eccesiasticorum Latinorum (CSEL), 100+ volumes, Vienna, (1866). Begun by German classical philologist Johannes Vahlen (1830–1911). A collection of Latin works of Christian authors from the 2nd to 8th centuries.
- Deux Inédits Byzantins sur les Azymites ay début du XIIme Siècle, 1 volume, Rome (1924). Edited by French Byzantinist Bernard Leib (1893–1977). Two anonymous works concerning the schism of 1054 and the rivalry between the patriarchs of Jerusalem and Antioch. Lieb also edited Rome, Kiev et Byzance à la fin du XIe siècle (Paris, 1924), a collection of documents of pope Urban II from 1088–1099,
- Ecclesiæ Græcæ Monumenta, græce et latine (EGM), 4 volumes, Paris (1677, 1681, 1686). Edited by French historian Jean-Baptiste Cotelier (1629–1686), published under the name Cotelerius. A collections of ancient and medieval ecclesiastic works. The fourth volume was completed after Cotelier's death and is known as Analecta Græca (Paris, 1688). Cotelier's principal work Sanctorum Patrum is found in MPG 1, 2 and 5.
- Italia sacra sive de episcopis Italiae, 10 volumes, Rome (1644–1662). Edited by Italian Cistercian monk and church historian Ferdinando Ughelli (1595–1670), with corrections, additions and a 10th volume added by Italian priest and historian Nicola Coleti (1680–1765), published from 1717–1722. A compilation of church documents through the 17th century and includes hagiographies, epigraphs and diplomatics, and the reproduction of seals and inscriptions.
- Liber jurium reipublicae Genuensis, 3 volumes, Turin (1854–1857). Edited by Italian politician and historian Ercole Ricotti (1816–1883). A collection of documents from the Republic of Genoa from the 12th century through 15th century. Part of the Monumenta historiae patria (volumes 7–9).
- Monumenta spectantia ad unionem ecclesiarum Graecae et Romanae, Athens (1872). Edited by Slovene philologist Franz Miklosich (1813–1891) and German historian Augustin Theiner (1804–1874).
- Patrologia Graeco-Latina (MPG), 161 volumes, Paris (1857–1866). Edited by French priest Jacques P. Migne (1800–1875) and updated by Italian theologian Ferdinand Cavallera (1875–1954). Writing of the Church fathers and other secular writers in Greek from the 3rd century to the 15th century. Volume 131 contains Anna Komnene's Alexiad. Part of Migne's Patrologiae Cursus Completus.
- Patrologia Latina (MPL), 221 volumes, Paris (1844–1855). Edited by Jacques P. Migne. Writing of the Church fathers and other ecclesiastical writers from 230–1216. Part of Migne's Patrologiae Cursus Completus. Volume 155 is of particular interest to the Crusades, with biographical material on Godfrey of Bouillon, original texts, and other documents on the kingdom through 1250.
- Patrologiae Cursus Completus. Series by Jacques P. Migne consisting of Patrologia Latina and Patrologia Graeco-Latina.
- Répertoire d'Epigraphie Sémitique (RES), 8 volumes, Paris (1900). By French orientalist Charles Simon Clermont-Ganneau(1846–1923) and Syriac scholar Jean-Baptiste Chabot (1860–1948). Published by the Commission du Corpus inscriptionum semiticarum.
- Revue de l'Orient Chrétien (ROC), 30 volumes, Paris (1896–1946). Published by the Société de l'Orient Chrétien. Edited by French Syriacists François Nau (1864–1931) and René Graffin (1858–1941). Collections of works concerning Eastern Christianity. (cf. French Wikipedia, René Graffin)
- Sacrorum Conciliorum nova et amplissima collectio (Sa Co), 31 volumes, Florence-Venice (1759–1798), 53 volumes, Paris (1901–1927). Begun by Italian historian Giovanni Domenico Mansi (1692–1769), continued by Abbé Jean. B. Martin and Louis Petit. Extensive edition of Church councils from the First Council of Nicaea in 325 through the Council of Florence in 1438. Includes the Canons of the Council of Clermont.
- Spicilegium, sive Collectio veterum aliquot scriptorum qui in Galliae bibliothecis, maxime Benedictinorum, latuerunt, 13 volumes, Paris (1655–1677). Edited by French Maurist historian Luc d'Achery (1609–1685). A collection of ancient and medieval documents of interest to the Benedictines. Continued by Edmond Martène (1654–1739) and Ursin Durand (1682–1771) in their Veterum Scriptorum.
- Thesaurus Novus Anedotorum, 3 volumes, Paris (1717). Edited by French Benedictine historians Edmond Martène (1654–1739) and Ursin Durand (1682–1771). Begun in 1708 with a search of the archives of France and Belgium for the Gallia Christiana. Documents gathered from eight hundred abbeys and one hundred cathedrals.
- Veterum Scriptorum et Monumentorum Amplissima Collectio, 9 volumes, Rouen (1727–1733). Edited by French Benedictine historians Edmond Martène (1654–1739) and Ursin Durand (1682–1771). A continuation of Luc d'Achery's Spicilegium on ancient and medieval documents of interest to the Benedictines.
- Wetzer-Welte Kirchenlexikon, 12 volumes (1847–1860), an encyclopedic work of Catholic biography, history, and theology by German orientalist Heinrich Joseph Wetzer (1801–1853).

=== Popes and the papacy ===
- Les Registres d'Alexandre IV, 3 volumes, Registres des Popes, Rome (1902, 1917). Edited by French historian Charles B. de La Roncière (1870–1941). Regesta of pope Alexander IV (1254–1261). (cf. French Wikipédia, Charles de La Roncière)
- Les Registres de Grégoire IX, 2 volumes, Registres des Popes, Rome (1896, 1907). Edited by French archivist Lucien Auvray (1860–1937). Regesta of pope Gregory IX (1227–1241).
- Les Registres de Grégoire X, 2 volumes, Registres des Popes, Rome (1892, 1906). Edited by French historian Jean Guiraud (1866–1953). Regesta of pope Gregory X (1271–1276).
- Les Registres d'Honorius IV, 1 volume, Registres des Popes, Rome (1886–1888). Edited by French historian and numismatist Maurice Prou (1861–1930). Regesta of pope Honorius IV (1285–1287).
- Les Registres d'Innocent IV, 4 volumes, Registres des Popes, Rome (1884–1921). Edited by French palaeographer and archivist Élie Berger (1850–1921). Regesta of pope Innocent IV (1243–1254).
- Les Registres de Nicolas III, 2 volumes, Registres des Popes, Rome (1898, 1938). Edited by French historians Jules Gay (1867–1935) and Suzanne Vitte. Regesta of pope Nicholas III (1227–1280). (cf. French Wikipédia, Jules Gay)
- Les Registres de Nicolas IV, 9 parts in 2 volumes, Registres des Popes, Rome (1896, 1905). Edited by French medieval historian Ernest Langlois (1857–1924). Regesta of pope Nicholas IV (1228–1292).
- Liber Pontificalis, 2 volumes, Paris (1884–1892). Edited by French historian Louis Duchesne (1843–1922), based on a first edition by Dutch theologian Joannes Busaeus (1547–1611). The Book of Popes is a collection of biographies of the popes through 1464, from Saint Peter through Pius II.
- Miscellanea Historiae Pontificiae (MHP), series, Rome (1939–present). Studies of pontifical history published by Pontificia University Gregoriana.
- Ponticicia commissio ad redigendum codicem luris canonici orientalis (PC), 117 works in 155 volumes, Fontes-Vatican (1935 ff.). Established by Pius XI in 1935 to draw up a code of Oriental canon law.
- Pontificum Romanorum, qui fuerunt inde ab exeunte saeculo IX usque ad finum saeculi XIII, vitae ab aequalibus conscriptae, 2 volumes, Leipzig (1862). Edited by German theologian and historian Johann M. Watterich (1826–1904). A collection of writings of the popes from the 9th century through the 13th century. (cf. German Wikipedia, Johann Matthias Watterich)
- Regesta Honorii Papae III, 2 volumes, Rome (1888–1895). Edited by Italian archivist Pietro Pressutti (fl. 1870–1889). Regesta of Honorius III (1216–1227).
- Regesta Pontificum Romanorum, 1198–1304, 2 volumes, Berlin (1874–1875). Edited by German historian August Potthast (1824–1898). Papal regesta from Innocent III through Benedict XI.
- Regesta Pontificum Romanorum ab Condita Ecclesia ad Annum p. Ch. n. 1198, 2 volumes, Leipzig (1885–1888). Edited by German historians Philipp Jaffé (1819–1870), William Wattenback (1819–1897) and ≈ (1854–1891) and others. Surviving regesta of selected popes from Gelasius I through Urban II. (cf. German Wikipedia, Samuel Löewenfeld)
- Registres des Popes, second series of Bibliothèque des Ecoles françaises d'Athènes et de Rome (1884–1938). Regesta of selected 13th century popes.
- Regestum Innocentii III Papae super Negotio Romani Imperii, 1 volume, in Miscellanea Historiae Pontificiae, Volume XII, Rome (1947). Edited by German Church historian Friederich Kempf (1908–2002). A palaeographic and diplomatics study of the regesta of pope Innocent III from 1098–1216. (cf. German Wikipedia, Friederich Kempf)
- Vetera monumenta Historica Hungariae Sacram Illustrantia, 2 volumes, Rome (1859–1860). Edited by German theologian and historian Augustin Theiner (1804–1874). A collection of authorities from the Vatican Apostolic Archive concerning Hungary, particularly their participation in the Fifth Crusade.
- Vitae Paparum Avenionensium, 4 volumes, Paris (1693). Edited by French historian Étienne Baluze (1630–1718), under the name of Stephanus Baluzius. A collection of biographies of the popes from 1305–1394. A critical edition by French historian Guillaume Mollat (1877–1968) was published 1914–1927.

=== Hagiographical collections ===
- Acta Sanctorum (Aa Ss), 68 volumes, Antwerp-Paris-Rome-Brussels (1643–1940). Begun by Jesuit hagiographer Heribert Rosweyde (1569–1629), continued by Flemish priest Jean Bolland (1596–1665) and the Bollandists. A hagiography of the lives of the saints, arranged by feast day. Also known as Acta Sanctorum Bollandiana.
- Acta Sanctorum: étude sur le recueil des Bollandists, 1 volume, Paris (1863). Edited by French literary historian Léon Gautier (1832 –1897). A study of the collection of the Bollandists.
- Acta Sanctorum Ordinis Sancti Benedicti (Aa Ss OSB), 9 volumes, Paris (1668–1701). Edited by Benedictine historian Luc d'Achery (1609–1685) and medievalist Jean Mabillon (1632–1707). A history of the lives of the saints of the Benedictine Order.
- Bibliotheca Hagiographica Graeca (BHG), 3 volumes, Brussels (1895, 1909). Begun by Belgian hagiographer Hippolyte Delehaye (1859–1941) and the Bollandists. A catalog of Greek hagiographical material, with literary works on the lives of saints, translations of relics and miracles.
- Bibliotheca Hagiographica Latina (BHL), 2 volumes, Brussels (1898–1901, supplement, 1911). Begun by Belgian hagiographer Hippolyte Delehaye (1859–1941) and the Bollandists. A catalog of Latin hagiographical material, with literary works on the lives of saints, translations of relics and miracles.
- Bibliotheca Hagiographica Orientalis (BHO), 1 volume, Brussels (1910). Edited by Dutch philologist and historian Paul Peeters (1870–1950). A catalog of Arabic, Syriac, Coptic, Armenian and Ethiopic hagiographical material, with literary works on the lives of saints, translations of relics and miracles. (cf. Dutch Wikipedia, Paul Peeters)

== Secular collections ==
=== Collections on Byzantium ===
- Bibliotheca Coisliniana, 1 volume, Paris (1705). Edited by French Benedictine monk and palaeographer Bernard de Montfaucon (1655–1741). An examination of the manuscripts of the Fonds Coislin, early Greek writings to include the Alexiad. Continued by Bibliotheca Coisliniana olim Segueriana (Paris, 1715), with Henri-Charles de Coislin and Carolus Robustel.
- Byzantinische Forschungen (Byz F), 30 volumes, Amsterdam (1966–2011). Edited by A.M. Hakkert. Byzantine research journal.
- Byzantinische Zeitschrift (Byz Z), 23 volumes, München (1892–1914). Byzantine studies journal, established by German scholar Karl Krumbacher (1856–1909). Includes Die Unionsverhandlungen zwischen Kaiser Alexios I and Papst Urban II im Jahre 1089, by Walther Holtzmann (1891–1963).
- Corpus Scriptorum Historæ Byzantinæ (CSHB), 50 volumes, Bonn (1828–1897). Originally edited by Jesuit historian and geographer Philippe Labbe (1607–1667) in 1648, updated by German historian Barthold G. Niebuhr (1776–1831). Primary sources from 330–1453 for the history of the Byzantine empire.
- Recueil des historiens des croisades historiens grecs (RHC Gr.), 2 volumes, Paris (1875–1881), Publ. Académie des Inscriptions et Belles Lettres. Edited by French Hellenist Carl B. Hase (1780–1844). Definitive collection of original Crusader sources from Greek authors.

=== French collections ===
- Archives de l'Orient Latin (AOL), 2 volumes, Société de l'Orient Latin, Paris (1881–1884). A collection of Crusader sources of itineraries, chronicles, letters and charters, continued by Revue de l'Orient Latin.
- Bibliothèque de l'École des Chartes (BEC), a journal dedicated to the study of medieval manuscripts begun in 1839. Published by the Société de l'École des Chartes, Paris.
- Bibliothèque de l'École des hautes-études (BÉc HÉ), 330 volumes, Paris (1889). Published by École pratique des hautes études. A collection dedicated to the study of religious sciences begun in 1889. Includes the study of literature, archaeology, history, law, philosophy, anthropology and sociology.
- Bibliothèque des Écoles françaises d'Athènes et de Rome (BEF), 336 volumes, Paris (1887–1960). Historical documents that includes the Registres des Popes.
- Chroniques des comtes d'Anjou et des seigneurs d'Amboise, 1 volume, Paris (1913). Edited by French medievalists Louis Halphen (1880–1950) and René Poupardin (1874–1927). Collection of texts of the counts of Anjou and lords of Amboise. Based on the Latin Gesta consulum Andegavorum (Tome X of Spicilegium) by French historian John of Marmoutier (fl. 1170), who used work by Thomas of Loches.
- Chroniques d'Anjou (Chroniques des comtes d'Anjou), 2 volumes, Paris (1871). Edited by French historians Paul Marchegay (1812–1885) and André Salmon (1881–1969). An earlier version of Chroniques des comtes d'Anjou et des seigneurs d'Amboise.
- Chroniques des Églises d'Anjou, 1 volume, Paris (1869). Edited by French historians Paul Marchegay (1812–1885) and Emile Mabille (1828–1874). Chronicles of the churches of Anjou, including Chronica domni Rainaldi archidiaconi sancti Mauricii Andegavensis by Renaud de Martigné (died 1138), archdeacon of Cathédrale Saint-Maurice d'Angers, and Chronique de Saint-Maixent 751–1140. (cf. French Wikipedia, Renaud de Martigné)
- Collectio Veterum Mommentorum [quae hactenus latuerant in varijs codicibus ac bibliothecis], 6 volumes, Paris (1678–1715). Edited by French historian Étienne Baluze (1630–1718), under the name of Stephanus Baluzius. A collection of relatively unknown ancient and medieval documents.
- Collection des meilleures dissertations, notices et traités relatifs à l'histoire de France, 20 volumes, Paris (1826–1840). Edited by French historian and bibliophile J. M. Constant Leber (1780–1859). A collection of dissertations, notices and treatises on the history of France.
- De re diplomatica Libre VI, 1 volume, Paris (1681). Edited by French Benedictine monk and palaeographer Jean Mabillon (1632–1707). An analysis of medieval documents and manuscripts back to the early 7th century. Foundational work for the fields of palaeography and diplomatics.
- Historiae Francorum Scriptores (HFS), 5 volumes, Paris (1636–1649). Edited by French geographer and historian André Duchesne (1584–1640), sometimes referred to as Du Chesne. Intended to comprise 24 volumes, contain the narrative sources for French history in the Middle Ages. Two volumes were published by the author. His son François published a third volume, the anonymous Historia Francorum Senonensis, covering 688–1015, and two others.
- Histoire générale de Languedoc (HGL), 16 volumes, Toulouse (1730–1904). A compendium of histories of Languedoc and the geography of the world. Volumes 1–5 were written by French Benedictine monks Joseph Vaissète (1685–1756) and Claude de Vic (1670–1734), cataloging the provincial archives, and continued to 1830 by Alexandre Du Mège (1780–1862). The work was increased to 16 volumes by Édouard Privat from 1877–1904. Auguste Molinier (1851–1904) wrote the medieval sections and Joseph Roman (1840–1921) wrote of the period from the beginning of the reign of Henry II to the end of that of Louis XIII, through the mid-17th century. Ernest Roschach (1837–1909) prepared Volumes 13 and 14 through the French Revolution. Volumes 15 and 16 cover ancient inscriptions and historical geography. (cf. French Wikipédia, Histoire générale de Languedoc, Claude Devic, Ernest Roschach)
- Histoire littéraire de la France, 46 volumes, Paris (1733–1892). Begun by French Benedictine monk Antoine Rivet de La Grange (1683–1749), known as Dom Rivet, and the Maurists. A collection of the literature of France. Of most interest to the Crusades is Tome VIII which includes a biography of Godfrey of Bouillon and works by Raymond of Aguilers and Peter Tudebode.
- Recueil des historiens des Gaules et de la France (RHF), 22 volumes (new edition, 24 volumes), Paris (1738–1876). Edited by French Benedictine monk and Maurist historian Martin Bouquet (1685–1754), et al. A collection of histories of France by Gaulian and French authors. (cf. French Wikipedia, Recueil des historiens des Gaules et de la France)
- Revue historique de droit français et étranger (RHDFE), 95 volumes (1853–2017). Journal covering legal and institutional history from Eastern and classical antiquity to modern and contemporary history.
- Revue de l'Orient Latin (ROL), 12 volumes, Geneva (1893–1911). Official journal of Société de l'Orient Latin founded by French historian Paul E. D. Riant (1836–1888). Later directed by archivist Charles A. Kohler (1854–1917). A continuation of Archives de l'Orient Latin that includes Crusader sources of itineraries, chronicles, letters and charters. (cf. French Wikipédia, Paul Riant)
- Traicte de l'origine des anciens Assassins, porte-cousteaux, 1 volume, Lyon (1603). Edited by French conseiller du roi Denis Lebey de Batilly (1551–1607). First compilation of Crusader sources discussion the Assassins. Subtitled Avec quelques exemples de leurs attentats and homicides és personnes d'aucuns rois, princes, an seigneurs chrestiente. In Volume 20 of Collection des meilleures. Lebey de Batilly also wrote Dionysii Lebei-Batillii regii mediomatricorum praesidis Emblemata.

=== Collections of Germany and the Holy Roman Empire ===
- Acta imperii inedita Sacculi XIII, 2 volumes, Innsbruck (1880–1885). Edited by German historian Eduard Winkelmann (1838–1896). A collection of previously unpublished works of the Holy Roman Empire from the 13th century.
- Acta Imperii Selecta, 1 volume, Innsbruck (1870). Selected research of German historian Johann F. Böhmer (1795–1863), later edited by German historian Julius von Ficker (1826–1902), including Übersicht nach den quellen. A collections of charters and other imperial documents from the 10th century until the 14th century.
- Allgemeine Geschichte in Einzeldarstellungen, 45 volumes, Berlin (1876–1891). Edited by German historian Christian Friedrich Georg Wilhelm Oncken (1838–1905). Allgemeine Geschichte in Einzeldarstellungen (General history in individual representations) was a historical book series which appeared in Berlin from 1878 to the 1890s. It was divided into four main sections: I. Main section (history of antiquity), II. Main section (history of the Middle Ages), III. Main Department (History of Modern Times), IV. Main Department (History of Modern Times). The main sections, in turn, were subdivided into different parts and these sometimes into individual volumes. Numerous renowned historians participated in the series. Oncken was also commissioned by Kaiser Wilhelm I to write a biography about him for posterity. This work forms the last part of the book series.(cf. German Wikipedia, Allgemeine Geschichte in Einzeldarstellungen).
- Biblioteca Rerum Germanicarum, 6 volumes, Berlin (1864–1873). Edited by German historian and philologist Philipp Jaffé (1819–1870). Collection including editions of the correspondence and vitae of Saint Boniface, works on Charlemagne and papal regesta of Gregory VII.
- Deutsche Reichstagsakten, Ältere Reihe (RTA), 22 volumes, Akademie der Wissenschaften, Munich (1867–1868). Edited by German historians Georg Voigt (1827–1891) and Julius Weizsäcker (1828–1889). Documents of the Holy Roman Empire from 1376–1485. (cf. German Wikipedia, Deutsche Reichstagsakten)
- Monumenta Germaniae Historica (MGH), Hanover (1826). Edited by German historians Georg H. Perez (1795–1876), Georg Waitz (1813–1886), Theodor Mommsen (1817–1903) and others. Comprehensive set of chronicle and archival sources for German history from the end of the Roman Empire until 1500.
- MGH Ep. MGH Epistoles.
- MGH Sc. MGH Scriptores.
- MGH Sc. rer. Ger. MGH Scriptores rerum Germanicarum.
- MGH Sc. rer. Ger. NS. MGH Scriptores rerum Germanicarum, nova series.
- Neue Quellen zur Geschichte des lateinischen Kaisertum, 3 volumes, Munich (1923). Edited and translated by German Byzantinist August Heisenberg (1869–1930). A collection of previously untranslated sources on the history of the Latin Empire, including works of Nicholas Mesarites. (cf. German Wikipedia, August Heisenberg)
- Quellen zur Geschichte der Juden in Deutschland, 3 volumes, Berlin (1892). Edited by German librarian and Hebrew reader Adolf Neubauer (1831–1907), rabbi Siegmund Salfeld (1843–1926), historian Robert Hoeniger (1855–1929) and mathematician Morit Stern (1807–1894). Includes Hebräische Berichte über die Judenverfolgungen Während der Kreuzzüge, a German translation of the verse of Eliezer ben Nathan.
- Scriptores rerum Hungaricarum, 3 volumes, Vienna (1746–1748). Edited by Austrian historian Johann Georg von Schwandtner (1716–1791). Selected medieval works from historically Austrian territories, including Hungary and Croatia.
- Scriptores rerum Prussicarum (SSRP), 5 volumes, Leipzig (1861–1874). German historians Theodor Hirsch (1806–1881), Max Töppen (1822–1893) and Ernst Strehlke (1834–1869). A collection of sources on early Prussian history including that of the Teutonic Knights. (cf. German Wikipedia, Scriptores rerum Prussicarum)

=== English collections ===
- Annales Monastici, 5 volumes, London (1864–1869), Rolls Series. Edited by British historian Henry Luard (1825–1891). Collection of texts for medieval English history, primarily from the 13th century, recording a chronology of local, national and international events. The coverage includes marriages and deaths, royal visits, appointments and acquisitions, astronomical observations, conflicts and power struggles, natural disasters, crimes and excommunications.
- Early English Text Society (EETS), 347 volumes (Original Series), 126 volumes (Extra Series), 25 volumes (Supplementary Series), London (1867–1920). Collections of early English texts.
- Foedera, Conventiones, Literae et Acta publica inter Reges Angliae, 20 volumes, London (1816–1869). The original Foedera was edited by English historian Thomas Rymer (1643–1713), consisting of 20 volumes dated 1704–1735, with the final four volumes prepared posthumously by Rymer's assistant Robert Sanderson (1660–1741). The work was published by bookseller Jacob Tonson (1655–1736), and re-edited by archivist George Holmes (1662–1749). The work compiles treaties, conventions, and literature of England from 1066–1625.
- Legenda aurea (Golden Legend), 7 volumes, London (1483, 1st English printing). Compiled by Italian chronicler Jacobus de Voragine (1230–1298) based on hundreds of sources including Abbreviatio in gestis et miraculis sanctorum by Jean de Mailly (fl. 13th century) and Epilogus in gestis sanctorum by Bartholomew of Trent (1200–1251). A hagiographic collection of the lives of the saints arranged according to feast day.
- Rerum britannicarum medii aevi scriptores (Rolls Series), 253 volumes, London (1858–1911). Begun by British archivists John Romilly (1802–1874), Joseph Stevenson (1806–1895) and Thomas D. Hardy (1804–1878). A collection of British and Irish medieval chronicles, archival records, legal tracts, folklore and hagiographical materials.

=== Italian collections ===
- Antiquitates Italicae, 17 volumes, Milan (1738–1742). First 6 volumes edited by Italian historian Ludovico A. Muratori (1672–1750). A collection of 75 essays on Italian history. Muratori updated the work with Dissertazioni sopra le Antichità italiane in 3 volumes, published in 1751, and Novus thesaurus veterum inscriptionum, 4 volumes, Milan (1739–1742), a collection of ancient inscriptions.
- Fonti per la Storia d'Italia (Fonti Sl), Istituto Italiano, 113 volumes, Rome (1887–1933). Sources for Italian history from 476–1268.
- Fonti per la storia de Venezia (Fonti SV), 54 volumes, Rome (1947 ff.). Sources of the history of medieval Vienna.
- Poesie Provenziale Storiche relative alli' Italia, 2 volumes, Tipografia del Senato, Rome (1931). Edited by Italian philologist Vincenzo De Bartholomeais (1867–1953). A collection of historical Provençal poems relating to Italy. (cf. Italian Wikipedia, Vincenzo De Bartholomeais)
- Raccolta di scelti diplomi Pisani (Diplomata Pisana), 1 volume, Pisa (1765). Edited by Flaminio Dal Borgo (1705–1768) of the Knights of Saint Stephen. A collection of diplomas concerning prominent Pisan families, including the signatories of the 1188 peace between Genoa and Pisa.
- Rerum Italicarum scriptores (RISc), 25 volumes in 28, Venice (1723–1751). Begun by Italian historian Ludovico A. Muratori (1672–1750). A collection of documents and sources on Italian history from the 6th century to the 15th century. Also known as RISc I Serie. (cf. Italian Wikipedia, Rerum Italicarum scriptores)
- Rerum Italicarum scriptores Nova series, (RISc NS), 34 volumes, Città di Castello/Bologna (1900 ff.). Begun by Italian scholars Giosuè Carducci (1835–1907) and Vittorio Fiorini (1860–1925). An updated edition of Rerum Italicarum scriptores, also known as II Serie. (cf. Italian Wikipedia, Giosuè Carducci, Vittorio Fiorini)

=== Arabic collections ===
- Annali dell' Islam, 10 volumes, Milan (1905–1907). Edited by Italian historian Leone Caetini (1869–1935). A chronology and critical analysis of the Islamic world organized by the works of Arabic historians.
- Biblioteca Arabo-sicula (BAS), 2 volumes, Turin and Rome (1880–1881). Edited by Italian historian Michele Amari (1806–1889). A collections of Arab sources related to the Norman Kingdom of Sicily in the 12th century.
- Catalogue de la collection de manuscrits orientaux, arabes, persans et turcs, 1 volume, Paris (1900). Edited by French historian Charles Henri Auguste Schefer (1820–1898).
- The Eclipse of the Abbasid Caliphate: Original Chronicles of the Fourth Islamic Century, 7 volumes, Oxford (1920–1921). Edited by British orientalists David S. Margoliouth (1858–1940) and Henry P. Amedroz (1854–1917). Includes the Book of Viziers of Hilal al-Sabi', Tajárib al-Umam by Miskawayh and the Damascus Chronicles of ibn al-Qalanisi.
- Extraits des Historiens Arabes, 1 volume, Paris (1829). Edited by French orientalist Joseph T. Reinaud (1795–1867). Extracts by Arab authors as they relate to the Crusades. Published in Michaud's Bibliothèque des Croisades.
- Kashf al-Zunun, 7 volumes, Constantinople (1650). Compiled by Turkish polymath Kâtip Çelebi (1609–1657). A bibliographic encyclopedia of books and sciences in Arabic, Turkish and Persian. Translated into Latin in the Lexicon Bibliographicum et Encyclopaedicum and served as basis for Bibliothèque orientale by Barthélemy d'Herbelot.
- Recueil des historiens des croisades historiens orientaux (RHC Or.), 5 volumes, Paris (1872–1906). Publ. Académie des Inscriptions et Belles Lettres. Definitive collection of original Crusader sources from Arabic, authors. Includes extracts from the Concise History of Humanity by Kurdish historian Abu'l-Fida (1273–1331); The Complete History of Arab/Kurdish historian Ali ibn al-Athir (1160–1233); Necklace of Pearls by Arab scholar Badr al-Din al-Ayni (1360–1453); the biographical dictionary of Arab scholar Ibn Khallikan (1211–1282); The Book of the Two Gardens by Arab historian Abu Shama (1203–1268), al-Rihlah (The Voyage) by Arab geographer Ibn Jubayr (1145–1217), and a biography of Saladin by Abu'l-Mahāsin Yūsuf (1411–1469); and Chronicle of Aleppo by Aleppan historian Kamal al-Din (1192–1262).

=== Armenian collections ===
- Collection des historiens anciens et modernes de l'Arménie, 2 volumes, Paris (1869). Edited by French historian, archaeologist, and numismatist Victor Langlois (1829–1869). A collection of historical documents of medieval and modern Armenia.
- Collection d'Historiens Arméniens: dix ouvrages sur l'histoire de l'Arménie et des pays adjacents du X^{e} au XIX^{e} siècle, 2 volumes, Saint Petersburg (1874–1876). Edited by French orientalist Marie-Félicité Brosset (1802–1880). A collection of historical documents of Armenia from the 10th through 14th centuries.
- Recueil des historiens des croisades documents arméniens (RHC Ar.), 2 volumes, Paris (1869–1906), Publ. Académie des Inscriptions et Belles Lettres. Definitive collection of original Crusader sources from Armenian authors.

=== Other European collections ===
- Chronicon Slavorum, 1 volume, Lübeck (1659). Edited by German historian Heinrich Bangert (1610–1665) also referred to asHenricus Bangertus. A collection on Slavic history that includes Chronica Slavorum by Helmold of Bosau (1120 –1177), as extended by Arnold of Lübeck (died 1211–1214), with additional material. Includes original sources on the Assassins. (cf. German Wikipedia, Heinrich Bangert)
- Diplomatari de l'Orient català (1301–1409): Documents per l'historia de la cultura catalana (Dipl), 1 volume, Barcelona (1947). Edited by Spanish-Catalan historian Antoni Rubió i Lluch (1856–1937). A collection of 717 documents on the Catalan expedition to the Holy Land and the Duchy of Athens and Duchy of Neopatras.
- Fornmanna Sögur, 12 volumes, Copenhagen (1825–1837). Published by the Royal Nordic Society of Antiquaries. (In Latin, Scripta historica Islandorum, de rebus gestis veterum borealium). Collection of works by and about the kings of Norway and Denmark of the 9th to 12th centuries, in Icelandic. Includes the 13th century sagas Jómsvíkinga saga and Knytlinga saga. (cf. Velkomin á Wikipedíu, Fornmanna sögur)
- History of the Jews, 6 volumes (1853–1875), by Heinrich Graetz (1817–1891), a German historian who wrote one of the first comprehensive history of the Jewish people from a Jewish perspective. The Crusades are covered in Volume 3.
- Records of Civilization: Sources and Studies (CURC), 98 volumes, Columbia University, New York (1915–1990). A large collection of translations of classical and medieval Western and Asian works. (cf. German Wikipedia, Records of Civilization: Sources and Studies)

== Encyclopedias ==
The first encyclopedia article on the Crusades is credited to Denis Diderot in the 18th century. In the 19th and early 20th centuries, three notable encyclopedia articles appeared. These are Philip Schaff's article in the Schaff-Herzog Encyclopaedia of Religious Knowledge; Louis Bréhier's two works on the Crusades and their Bibliography and Sources in the Catholic Encyclopedia; and the work of Ernest Barker in the 11th edition of the Encyclopædia Britannica, later expanded into a separate publication. All three have interesting bibliographies showing histories deemed important at the time.

Denis Diderot. Denis Diderot (1713–1784), French author who regarded the effects of the Crusades as "uniformly dire" (Oeuvres, Volume 14).

- Encyclopédie (1751–1772). The entry on Crusades in Volume 2 is based on Voltaire's Histoire des Croisades.
- Oeuvres, 26 volumes, edited by French philosopher and editor Jacques-André Naigeon (1738–1810), published 1821–1834.

Philip Schaff. Philip Schaff (1819–1893), a Swiss theologian and ecclesiastical historian.

- History of the Christian Church, 8 volumes (1858–1867). Volume 5: The Middle Ages from Gregory VII (1049) to Boniface VIII (1294). Chapter VII: The Crusades, covers the First Crusade through the fall of Acre in 1291. Includes discussion on literature.
- Schaff-Herzog Encyclopaedia of Religious Knowledge (1884). Editor of the general work and author of influential article on the Crusades in Volume 3, pp. 315–318. Covers the first eight Crusades (combining the last two into one). Topics include: The First Crusade, 1096–1099; The Second and Third Crusades, 1147–1149, 1189–1192; The Fourth Crusade, 1202–1204; The Fifth, Sixth, and Seventh Crusades, 1228–1270; Power of Papacy Increased, also Intolerance; Devotion Stimulated, Absolution Extended; The Renaissance and Reformation; with extensive bibliography.

James Wood. James Wood (1820–1901), a Scottish editor and encyclopaedist.

- The Nuttall Encyclopædia (1900). A concise and comprehensive dictionary of general knowledge named for Dr. Peter Austin Nuttall. Includes a brief discussion of the first eight Crusades.

Louis R. Bréhier. Louis R. Bréhier (1869–1951), a French historian specializing in Byzantine studies.

- Crusades (1908). In the Catholic Encyclopedia (1907–1912), edited by Charles G. Herbermann (1840–1916). An overview of the history of the Crusades, numbered as eight. Topics include: I. Origin of the Crusades; II. Foundation of Christian states in the East; III. First destruction of the Christian states (1144–1187); IV. Attempts to restore the Christian states and the Crusade against Saint-Jean d'Acre (1192–1198); V. The Crusade against Constantinople (1204); VI. The thirteenth-century Crusades (1217–1252); VII. Final loss of the Christian colonies of the East (1254–1291); VIII. The fourteenth-century Crusade and the Ottoman invasion; IX. The Crusade in the fifteenth century; X. Modifications and survival of the idea of the Crusade.
- Crusades (Bibliography and Sources) (1908). A concise summary of the historiography of the Crusades. In the Catholic Encyclopedia.

Ernest Barker. Ernest Barker (1874–1960), an English political scientist.

- Crusades (1911), in the 11th edition of the Encyclopædia Britannica. A summary of the history of the Crusades, with sections on the Meaning of the Crusades, Historical Causes of the Crusades, and Literature of Crusades.
- The Crusades (1923). A later edition of the Encyclopædia Britannica article, edited with additional notes.

== Journals ==
Journals and periodicals that publish Crusader articles include the following.

American Historical Review. American Historical Review was founded in 1895 as the premier journal of American history.

Archives de l'Orient Latin (AOL). Archives de l'Orient Latin (AOL), 2 volumes (1881, 1884).

Bibliothèque de l'École des Chartes (BEC). Bibliothèque de l'École des Chartes (BEC) (1839–present) is a journal dedicated to the study and use of medieval manuscripts and is used extensively in Crusader studies. It is published by the Société de l'École des chartes.

Bulletin of the Institute of Historical Research. Bulletin of the Institute of Historical Research (1923–1987), a scholarly journal published by the Institute of Historical Research.

Byzantinische Zeitschrift. Byzantinische Zeitschrift (1892–present) is a Byzantine studies journal established by Byzantine scholar Karl Krumbacher (1856–1909).

Byzantion. Byzantion is an international peer-reviewed journal founded in 1924 devoted to Byzantine culture and covers literature, history and art history, including the related disciplines.

Catholic Historical Review. Catholic Historical Review (1915–present), publishes original articles in English on topics related to the history of various Catholic experiences and their intersections with cultures and other religious traditions over the centuries and throughout the world.

Crusades. Journal of the Society for the Study of the Crusades and the Latin East, Issues 1–18. Edited by Benjamin Z. Kedar, Jonathan Philips and Jonathan Riley-Smith (2003–present).

Die Welt des Islams. Die Welt des Islams (1915–present). International Journal for the Study of Modern Islam.

Dumbarton Oaks Papers. Dumbarton Oaks Papers is an academic journal founded in 1941 for the publication of articles relating to Byzantine society and culture from the 4th to 15th century.

English Historical Review. The English Historical Review was founded in 1886.

Forschungen zur deutschen Geschichte. Forschungen zur deutschen Geschichte (1862–1886), a journal dedicated to research on German history.

Historische Zeitschrift. Historische Zeitschrift, founded in 1859 by Heinrich von Sybel is considered to be the first and for a time the foremost historical journal.

History. History: The Journal of the Historical Association (1916–present) is a journal published quarterly on behalf of the Historical Association.

Journal des Savants. Journal des Savants (1665–present), a leading French academic journal in the humanities. Originally published as Journal des Sçavans, it was under the patronage of Académie des Inscriptions et Belles-Lettresbeginning in 1908.

Journal of Ecclesiastical History. The Journal of Ecclesiastical History (1950 – present) is a peer-review journal on ecclesiastical history.

Journal of Medieval History. The Journal of Medieval History (1975 – present) is an academic journal on European and medieval history.

Journal of the American Oriental Society. Journal of the American Oriental Society.

Journal of the Asiatic Society of Bengal. Journal of the Asiatic Society of Bengal, new series.

Journal of the Royal Asiatic Society. Journal of the Royal Asiatic Society, 1804–2004.

Mémoires de l'Académie des Inscriptions. Mémoires de l'Académie des Inscriptions is an academic journal published by the Académie des Inscriptions et Belles-Lettres.

Mémoires de l'Institut de France. Mémoires de l'Institut de France (1821–1975), an academic journal.

Palestine Exploration Quarterly. Palestine Exploration Quarterly (1869–) is the journal of the Palestine Exploration Fund, devoted to the study of the history, archaeology and geography of the Levant.

Revue de l'Orient Latin (ROL). Revue de l'Orient Latin (ROL), 12 volumes (1893–1911). Official journal of Société de l'Orient Latin founded by French historian Paul E. D. Riant (1836–1888). Later directed by archivist Charles A. Kohler (1854–1917). A continuation of Archives de l'Orient Latin (AOL) that includes Crusader sources of itineraries, chronicles, letters and charters.

Revue d'Histoire littéraire de la France. Revue d'Histoire littéraire de la France (1894–present). A quarterly journal covering the study of French literature since the fifteenth century.

Revue historique. Revue historique (1876–present), a French academic journal.

Revue des questions historiques Revue des questions historiques (1886–1939). A historical review influenced by Ultramontanists and Legitimists. (cf. French Wikipedia, Revue des questions historiques)

Saeculum. Saeculum is a German scholarly journal launched in 1950 by the historian Georg Stadtmüller (1909–1985).

Slavonic and Eastern European Review. The Slavonic and Eastern European Review (1922–present). A quarterly historical review covering Slavonic and Eastern European matters. Known as the Slavonic Review from 1122–1127.

Speculum. Speculum: A Journal of Medieval Studies (1926–present), a quarterly academic journal published on behalf of the Medieval Academy of America. Its focus is from 500 to 1500 in Western Europe, but include subjects such as Byzantine, Hebrew, Arabic, Armenian and Slavic studies.

The Academy. The Academy (1869–1902), a review of literature and general topics.

Transactions of the Royal Historical Society. Transactions of the Royal Historical Society, publishing from 1872–2014.

Zeitschrift des Deutschen Palästina-Vereins. Zeitschrift des Deutschen Palästina-Vereins (Journal of the German Society for Exploration of Palestine) (1878–present), is a biannual journal covering research on the cultural history of the Levant.

== Abbreviations ==
Modern Crusader histories typically use standard abbreviations for frequently-referenced collections. These include the following.

Source collections

- Aa Ss. Acta Sanctorum
- Aa Ss OSB. Acta Sanctorum Ordinis Sancti Benedicti
- AOL. Archives de l'Orient Latin
- BAS. Biblioteca Arabo-sicula
- BEC. Bibliothèque de l'École des Chartes
- BÉc HÉ. Bibliothèque de l'École des hautes-études
- BEF or BÉFAR. Bibliothèque des Ecoles françaises d'Athènes et de Rome
- BHG. Bibliotheca Hagiographica Graeca
- BHL. Bibliotheca Hagiographica Latina
- BHO. Bibliotheca Hagiographica Orientalis
- Bibl AH. Bibliothèque archéologique et historique
- BO. Bibliotheca Orientalis
- BOF or BTSOF. Biblioteca Bio-bibliografica della Terra Santa e dell' Orient Francescano
- BOP. Bullarium ordanis praedicatorum
- Byz F. Byzantinische Forschungen
- Byz Z. Byzantinische Zeitschrift
- Cart. Cartulaire général de l'Ordre des Hospitaliers
- CIS. Corpus Inscriptionum Semiticarum
- CSHB. Corpus Scriptorum Historæ Byzantinæ
- CSCO. Corpus Scriptorum Christianorum Orientalium
- CSEL. Corpus Scriptorum Eccesiasticorum Latinorum
- CURC. Columbia University, Records of Civilization: Sources and Studies
- DHR Cr. Documents relatifs à l'histoire des croisades
- Dipl. Diplomatari de l'Orient català (1301–1409)
- DK. Die Kreuzzugsbriefe aus den Jahren
- EETS. Early English Text Society
- EGM. Ecclesiæ Græcæ Monumenta, græce et latine
- Fonti SI. Fonti per la Storia d'Italia
- Fonti SV. Fonti per la storia de Venezia
- GDF. Gesta Dei per Francos
- HFS. Historiae Francorum Scriptores
- HGL. Histoire générale de Languedoc
- HMP. Historiae Patriae Monumenta or Monumenta historiae patria
- Itin H. Itinera Hierosolymitana et Descriptiones Terrae Sanctae bellis sacris anteriora
- Malta. Catalogue of the records of the Order of St. John of Jerusalem in the Royal Malta Library
- Mansi. Sacrorum Conciliorum nova et amplissima collectio
- Med Lib Gr. Medieval Library (Biblioteca Graeca Medii Aevi)
- MGH. Monumenta Germaniae Historica
- MGH Ep. Monumenta Germaniae Historica, Epistoles
- MGH Sc. Monumenta Germaniae Historica, Scriptores
- MGH Sc. rer. Ger. Monumenta Germaniae Historica, Scriptores rerum Germanicarum
- MGH Sc. rer. Ger. NS. Monumenta Germaniae Historica, Scriptores rerum Germanicarum, nova series
- MHP. Miscellanea Historiae Pontificiae
- MPG or PG, Migne. Patrologia Graeco-Latina
- MPL or PL, Migne. Patrologia Latina
- PC. Ponticicia commissio ad redigendum codicem luris canonici orientalis
- PO. Patrologia Orientalis
- PPTS. Palestine Pilgrims' Text Society
- RES. Répertoire d'Epigraphie Sémitique
- RHC. Recueil des historiens des croisades
- RHC Ar. Recueil des historiens des croisades, Documents arméniens
- RHC Gr. Recueil des historiens des croisades, Historiens grecs
- RHC Lois. Recueil des historiens des croisades, Assises de Jérusalem
- RHC Oc. Recueil des historiens des croisades, Historiens occidentaux
- RHC Or. Recueil des historiens des croisades, Historiens orientaux
- RHDFE. Revue historique de droit français et étranger
- RHF. Recueil des historiens des Gaules et de la France (Rec Gaul)
- RISc. Rerum Italicarum scriptores
- RISc NS. Rerum Italicarum scriptores Nova series
- ROC. Revue de l'Orient Chrétien
- ROL. Revue de l'Orient Latin
- Rolls Series or RS. Rerum britannicarum medii aevi scriptores
- RTA. Deutsche Reichstagsakten
- Sa Co. Sacrorum Conciliorum nova et amplissima collectio
- SMQBS. Scriptores Minores Quinti Belli sacri
- SOL SG, Société de l'Orient Latin, Série géographique
- SOL SH. Société de l'Orient Latin, Série historique
- SSRP. Scriptores rerum Prussicarum
- Tab Ord Theut. Tabulae Ordinis Teutonici

Biographical collections

- ADB. Allgemeine Deutsche Biographie (Germany)
- DBE. Diccionario biográfico español (Spain)
- DBI. Dizionario Biografico Degli Italiani (Italy)
- DNB. Dictionary of National Biography (England)
- EBV. En Biografías y Vidas (Spanish)
- NBG. Nouvelle Biographie Générale (France)
- NDB. Neue Deutsche Biographie (Germany)
- ODCC. Oxford Dictionary of the Christian Church
- SBD. Syriac Biographical Dictionary (Syriac)

== See also ==
- Cartography of Jerusalem
- Cartography of Palestine
- Crusader States
- Crusading Movement
- Islamic Views on the Crusades
- Travelogues of Palestine
