= Bibliotheca Hagiographica =

Bibliotheca Hagiographica may refer to:

- Bibliotheca Hagiographica Graeca (BHG)
- Bibliotheca Hagiographica Latina (BHL)
- Bibliotheca Hagiographica Orientalis (BHO)
