= Ursin Durand =

French Benedictine and historian

Ursin Durand (20 May 1682, Tours – 31 August 1771, Paris) was a French Benedictine of the Maurist Congregation, and historian.

== Life ==
Durand took vows in the monastery of Marmoutier at the age of nineteen and devoted himself especially to the study of diplomatics. In April, 1709, he joined his confrère Edmond Martène, who was making a literary tour through France with the purpose of collecting material for a new edition of a Gallia Christiana. After searching the archives of more than eight hundred abbeys and one hundred cathedral churches, they returned in 1713 to the monastery of St-Germain-des-Prés, laden with all kinds of historical documents, many of which were included in Gallia Christiana, while the others were published in a separate work, entitled Thesaurus novus anecdotorum (5 vols. folio, Paris, 1717).

In 1718 the two Maurists started on a new literary tour through Germany and the Netherlands to collect material for Martin Bouquet's Rerum Gallicarum et Francicarum Scriptores. Besides collecting valuable material for Bouquet's work they gathered an immense mass of other historical documents which they published in a large work entitled Veterum scriptorum et monumentorum historicorum, dogmaticorum et moralium amplissima collectio (9 vols. fol. Paris, 1724–33). They also jointly published in French a learned account of their journeys: Voyage littéraire de deux religieux bénédictins de la Congrégation de St. Maur (2 vols. Paris, 1717 and 1724).

In addition to the works which Durand published jointly with Martène, he also collaborated with Dantine and Clémencet in a French work on diplomatics, entitled L'Art de vérifier les dates, continued Constant's Collection of Papal Letters, assisted Sabatier with the edition of the "Itala" and contributed to many other Maurist publications.

In 1734 he was banished from the monastery of St-Germain-des-Prés as a Jansenist "Appellant", at the instance of Cardinal de Bissy. He was sent to the monastery of St. Eloi in Noyon. After two years he was permitted to repair to the monastery of Blancs-manteaux in Paris; where he spent the remainder of his life in literary pursuits.

== Works ==
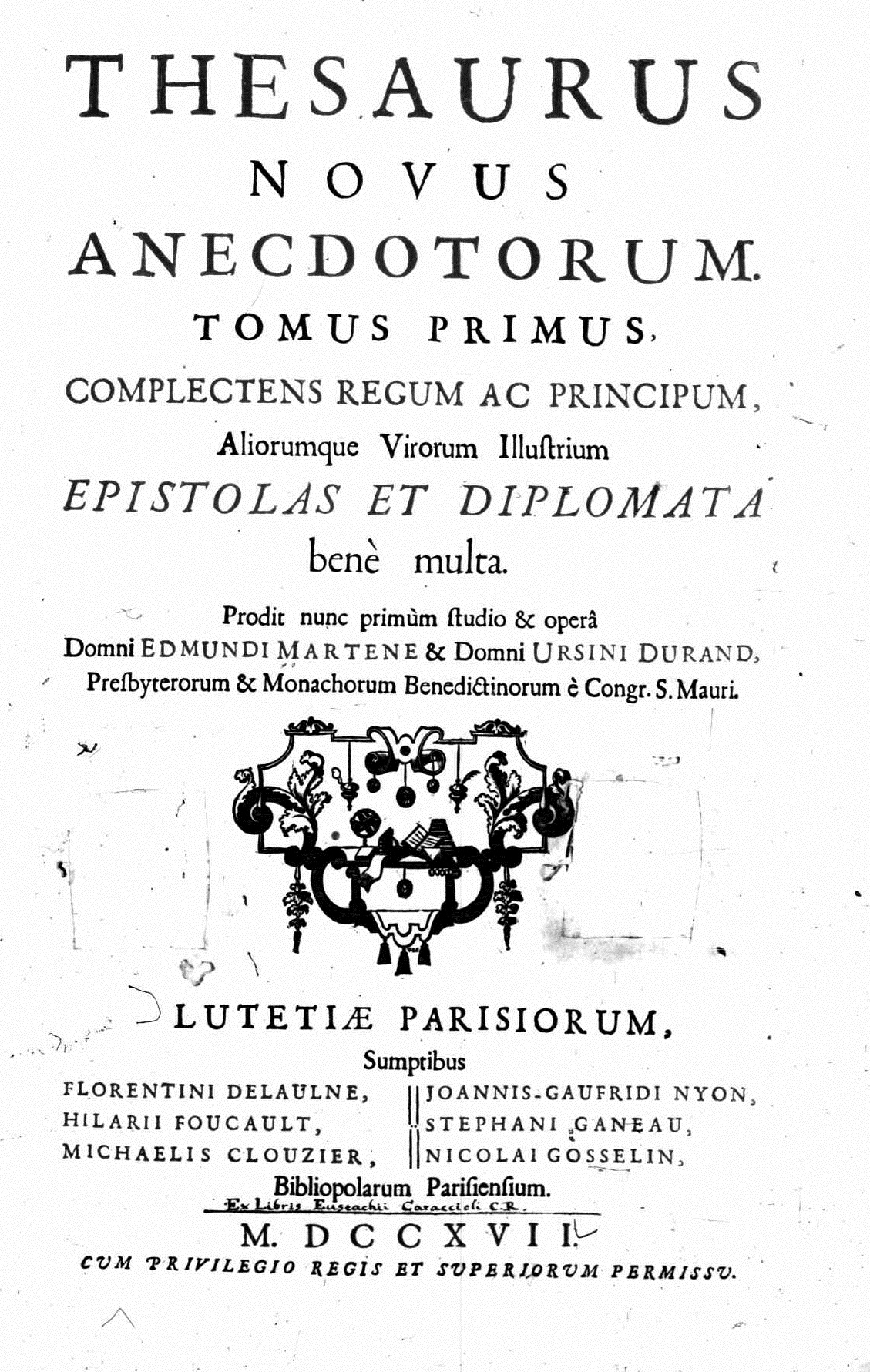
Thesaurus novus anecdotorum, 1717

- Thesaurus novus Anecdotorum, 5 vol. in-folio, Paris, 1717.
  - Thesaurus novus anecdotorum (in Latin). Vol. 1. Paris: Florentin Delaulne. 1717.
  - Thesaurus novus anecdotorum (in Latin). Vol. 3. 1717.
- Veterum scriptorum et monumentorum historicorum, dogmatiorum et moralium amplissima collectio, 9 vol. fol., Paris, 1724-1733.
  - Veterum scriptorum et monumentorum historicorum, dogmaticorum, moralium amplissima collectio. Vol. 4. 1729.
  - Veterum scriptorum et monumentorum historicorum, dogmaticorum, moralium amplissima collectio. Vol. 5. 1729.
  - Veterum scriptorum et monumentorum historicorum, dogmaticorum, moralium amplissima collectio. Vol. 9. 1733.
- Voyage littéraire de deux Religieux Bénédictins de la Congrégation de Saint-Maur, 2 vol., Paris, 1717 and 1724.
- L'Art de vérifier les dates (with Maur Dantine and Charles Clémencet), 1750 edition in 2 parts
  - L'Art de vérifier les dates, 1770 edition
  - L'Art de vérifier les dates, 1818-1819 edition, 5 volumes
