= BHO =

BHO can refer to:

- Barack Hussein Obama II (born 1961), 44th president of the United States (2009–2017)
- Barack Hussein Obama, Sr., father of Barack Hussein Obama II
- Bhojpuri language (ISO 639 alpha-3, bho)
- Bibliotheca Hagiographica Orientalis, a hagiographical sourcebook
- Blackhorse Road station (National Rail station code BHO)
- British History Online
- Browser Helper Object
- Butane hash oil
- Raja Bhoj Airport IATA code
- Bachmann-Howard ordinal
