= Dantine =

Dantine is a surname. Notable people with the surname include:

- Helmut Dantine (1917–1982), Austrian-American actor
- Maurus Dantine (1688–1746), Belgian Benedictine and chronologist

== See also ==
- Michel Dantin (born 1960), French politician
