= Histoire littéraire de la France =

History of French literature

Histoire littéraire de la France is an enormous history of French literature initiated in 1733 by Dom Rivet and the Benedictines of St. Maur. It was abandoned in 1763 after the publication of volume XII. In 1814, members of the Académie des inscriptions et belles-lettres (part of the Institut de France) took over the project, which had stopped halfway through the 12th century, and continued where the Benedictines had left off. From 1865 to 1892, the first sixteen volumes were reprinted with only minor corrections, in parallel with the regular series.

As of 2018, 46 volumes had been published, covering the period up to 1590. To increase the pace and prevent the project from coming to a halt, the committee in charge decided in March 1999 to abandon a strict chronological order in favor of a less constrained structure.

== Editors-in-chief ==
- volumes 1 to 9 : Dom Antoine Rivet de La Grange (1683–1749), mainly
- volumes 10 to 12 : Dom Charles Clémencet and Dom François Clément
- volumes 13 to 20 : Académie des inscriptions et belles-lettres, mainly Pierre Daunou
- volumes 20 to 24 (1842–1863): Victor Le Clerc
- volumes 25 to 31 (1869–1893): Barthélemy Hauréau
- volumes 32 to 34 (1898–1917): Paul Meyer
- volumes 35 to 36 (1921–1926): Charles-Victor Langlois
- volumes 37 to 38 (1938–1949): Mario Roques
- volumes 39 to 41 (1962–1981): Charles Samaran

== Published volumes ==
Volume	Date	Title	Digital copies
1/1	1733	Les tems qui ont précedé la naissance de Jesus-Christ, et les trois premiers siécles de l'Église	Google Books
	1865	Les tems qui ont précedé la naissance de Jesus-Christ, et les trois premiers siécles de l'Église. Reprint by Victor Palmé, Paris	Internet Archive
1/2	1733	Le quatrième siècle de l'Église	
	1865	Le quatrième siècle de l'Église. Reprint by Victor Palmé, Paris	Internet Archive
2	1735	Les cinquième siècles de l'Église (sic!)	Google Books
	1865	Le cinquième siècle de l'Église. Reprint by Victor Palmé, Paris	Internet Archive
3	1735	Les sixième et septième siècles de l'Église	Google Books
	1866	Le cinquième siècle de l'Église (sic!). Reprint by Victor Palmé, Paris	Internet Archive
4	1738	Le huitième siècle et partie du neuvième, jusqu'à 840, inclusivement	Google Books
	1866	Les huitième et neuvième siècles de l'Église. Reprint by Victor Palmé, Paris	Internet Archive
5	1740	La suite du neuvième siècle de l'Église jusqu'à la fin	Google Books
	1866	La suite du neuvième siècle de l'Église jusqu'à la fin. Reprint by Victor Palmé, Paris	Internet Archive
6	1742	Le dixième siècle de l'Église	Google Books
	1867	Le dixième siècle de l'Église. Reprint by Victor Palmé, Paris	Internet Archive
7	1746	Les soixante-huit premières années du onzième siècle de l'Église	Google Books
	1867	Le onzième siècle de l'Église. Reprint by Victor Palmé, Paris	Internet Archive
8	1747	Le reste du onzième siècle de l'Église	Google Books
	1868	Le reste du onzième siècle de l'Église. Reprint by Victor Palmé, Paris	Internet Archive
9	1750	Le commencement du douzième siècle de l'Église	Google Books
	1868	Le commencement du douzième siècle de l'Église. Reprint by Victor Palmé, Paris	Internet Archive
10	1756		Google Books
	1868	La suite du douzième siècle de l'Église jusqu'à l'an 1124. Reprint by Victor Palmé, Paris	Internet Archive
11	1759	La suite du douzième siècle de l'Église jusqu'à l'an 1141	Google Books
	1841	La suite du XIIe siècle de l'Église jusqu'à l'an 1141. Reprint by Firmin Didot and Treuttel et Wurtz, Paris	Internet Archive
12	1763	La suite du XIIe siècle de l'Église jusqu'à l'an 1167	Google Books
	1830	La suite du XIIe siècle de l'Église jusqu'à l'an 1167. Reprint by Firmin Didot and Treuttel et Wurtz, Paris	Internet Archive
13	1814	Suite du douzième siècle	Internet Archive
	1814	Suite du douzième siècle. Reprint by Victor Palmé, Paris	
14	1817	Suite du douzième siècle	BSB
	1869	Suite du douzième siècle. Reprint by Victor Palmé, Paris	Internet Archive
15	1820	Suite du douzième siècle	Internet Archive
	1869	Suite du douzième siècle. Reprint by Victor Palmé, Paris	Internet Archive
16	1824	Treizième siècle	Google Books
	1892	Treizième siècle. Reprint by Victor Palmé, Paris	Internet Archive
17	1832	Suite du treizième siècle, jusqu'à l'an 1226	Internet Archive
18	1835	Suite du treizième siècle, jusqu'à l'an 1255	Internet Archive
19	1838	Suite du treizième siècle, années 1256–1285	Internet Archive
20	1842	Suite du treizième siècle, depuis l'année 1286	Internet Archive
21	1847	Suite du treizième siècle, depuis l'année 1296. Suppléments	Internet Archive
22	1852	Suite du treizième siècle	Internet Archive
23	1856	Fin du treizième siècle	Internet Archive
24	1862	Quatorzième siècle	Internet Archive
25	1869	Suite du quatorzième siècle	Internet Archive
26	1873	Suite du quatorzième siècle	Internet Archive
27	1877	Suite du quatorzième siècle	Internet Archive
28	1881	Suite du quatorzième siècle	Internet Archive
29	1885	Suite du quatorzième siècle	Internet Archive
30	1888	Suite du quatorzième siècle	Internet Archive
31	1893	Quatorzième siècle	Internet Archive
32	1898	Suite du quatorzième siècle	Internet Archive
33	1906	Suite du quatorzième siècle	Internet Archive
34	1914	Suite du quatorzième siècle	Internet Archive
35	1921	Suite du quatorzième siècle	Internet Archive
36	1927	Suite du quatorzième siècle	Internet Archive
37	1938	Suite du quatorzième siècle	Internet Archive
38	1949	Suite du quatorzième siècle	Internet Archive
39	1962	Suite du quatorzième siècle	Internet Archive
40	1974	Suite du quatorzième siècle	
41	1981	Suite du quatorzième siècle	Internet Archive
42/1	1995	Suite du quatorzième siècle: Z. Kaluza: Nicolas d'Autrécourt	
42/2	2002	Contributions of Christian Ménage, Christine Gadrat, Marion Schnerb-Lièvre, Maryvonne Spiesser and Alain Dufour	
43/1	2005	Contributions of Emmanuel Poulle, Jeannine Quillet, Hélène Biu, Maryvonne Spiesser and Franck Collard	
43/2	2014	Contributions of Louis Faivre d'Arcier, Cédric Giraud, Amandine Postec, Stéphanie Aubert and Claire Martin	
44	2015	Contribution of Hanne Lange: Odon de Morimond (1116–1161), prieur de Morimond, abbé de Beaupré en Lorraine (?–1156), abbé de Morimond (1156–1161). Thèmes et structures de son oeuvre. Traités sur la symbolique des nombres. Sermons	
45	2016	Contribution of Emanuele Arioli: Ségurant ou le Chevalier au Dragon : roman arthurien inédit (XIIIe-XVe s.)	
46	2018	Contribution of Xavier Prévost: Jacques Cujas (1522–1590)	
47	2021	Contribution of Alain Corbellari: Oton de Grandson	

=== Indices ===
Volume	Date	Title	Digital copies
[15 bis]	1875	Table générale par ordre alphabétique des matières contenues dans les quinze premiers volumes	Internet Archive
[43 bis]	2008	Index des t. XVI à XLI, by Emmanuel Poulle	
