= Martin Bouquet =

French Benedictine monk and historian

Martin Bouquet (French pronunciation: [maʁtɛ̃ bukɛ]; 6 August 1685 – 6 April 1754) was a French Benedictine monk and historian, of the Catholic Congregation of St.-Maur. His major work was Rerum Gallicarum et Francicarum Scriptores, a collection of the historians of Gaul and France, which covers the time from France's earliest history until the year 987.

== Biography ==
Bouquet was born at Amiens. As a boy he wanted to become a priest, but later decided to become a Benedictine monk. He joined the Congregation of St Maur and took vows at the monastery of St Faron, at Meaux on 16 August 1706.

Shortly after he became a priest his superiors appointed him librarian at the monastery of St.-Germain-des-Prés, which at that time possessed a library of 60,000 books and 8,000 manuscripts. Being well versed in ancient Greek, Bouquet assisted his confrère Bernard de Montfaucon in his edition of the works of John Chrysostom. He himself was preparing a new edition of the Jewish historian Flavius Josephus, and had already progressed far in his work when he heard that the Dutch writer Sigebert Haverkamp was engaged on a new edition of the same author. He sent all the material he had collected to Haverkamp, who embodied it in his edition.

Bouquet's greatest work is his collection of the historians of Gaul and France, entitled: Rerum Gallicarum et Francicarum Scriptores.

Attempts to collect the sources of French history had been made at various times. Thus Pierre Pithou (died 1596) had collected some material, and André Duchesne (died 1640) had begun a work entitled "Historiæ Francorum Scriptores", to be published in twenty-four volumes, but died before finishing the fifth volume. Colbert, the great French minister of finance, desired to have Duchesne's work continued at the expense of the State, but he died in 1683 without finding a suitable historian to complete what Duchesne had begun.

In 1717 D'Aguesseau, who was then chancellor, entrusted to the Benedictine Edmond Martène the drawing up of a new plan for the work. The design was accepted and the Oratorian LeLong who had just finished his "Bibliothèque historique de la France" was entrusted with the task. Martène died shortly after he had begun, in 1721.

The Congregation of St.-Maur undertook the publication of the work. Dionysius de Sainte-Marte, who was then superior-general of the congregation, placed Bouquet in charge of the undertaking. Bouquet began an entirely new work and had the first two volumes ready for print in 1729, but their publication was delayed. Some monks of the Congregation of St.-Maur refused to submit to the Bull Unigenitus which was directed against Pasquier Quesnel. Bouquet submitted after some hesitation. When, however, Cardinal De Bissy required the monks of St.-Germain-des-Prés to sign a formula of submission he had drawn up, Bouquet and seven others refused their signature because De Bissy, being merely Abbot in commendam of St.-Germain-des-Prés, had no spiritual jurisdiction over the monks.

Bouquet was banished to the monastery of St.-Jean, at Laon, but in 1735, D'Aguesseau and a few other influential persons succeeded in having him recalled to Argenteuil, and afterwards to Blancs-Manteaux, where he could more easily supervise the publication of his work. He brought out eight volumes between 1738 and 1752. The greater part of the material for the ninth volume was ready when Bouquet died at the monastery of Blancs-Manteaux, in Paris.

The eight volumes published comprise the sources of the history of France from the earliest days of its existence to the year 987. The work was continued by other members of the Congregation of St.-Maur in the following order: vols. IX-X were published by the two brothers, John and Charles Haudiquier; vol. XI, by Housseau, Précieux, and Poirier; vols. XII-XIII, by Clément and Brial; vols. XIV-XVIII, by Brial. The remaining five volumes were published by the Académie des Inscriptions which completed the work in 1876. A new edition in twenty-five volumes, undertaken by Leopold Delisle, a member of the Académie des Inscriptions, reached the twenty-fourth volume.
