= Antoine Rivet de La Grange =

Dom Antoine Rivet de La Grange (Confolens, 1683 - Le Mans, 1749) was a French benedictine monk and supporter of Jansenism.

He was opposed to the Unigenitus papal bull and, because he was Jansenist, his superiors sent him to the Abbey of St. Vincent in Le Mans, where he spent the last thirty years of his life.

Dom Rivet finished the Nécrologe de Port-Royal des Champs (1723) and edited the first nine volumes of the Histoire littéraire de la France (1733–49), which was continued by François Clément and later by the French Académie des Inscriptions et Belles-Lettres.
