= August Friedrich Pfeiffer =

German librarian and theologian

- Born: 13 January 1748; Erlangen
- Died: 15 July 1817 (aged 69)
- Occupation: Librarian, theologian
- Employer: University of Erlangen–Nuremberg

August Friedrich Pfeiffer was a Lutheran theologian of Germany.

He was born in Erlangen on 13 January 1748, where he also commenced his academical career in 1769. In 1776 he was professor of Oriental languages and in 1805 was head librarian of the university. He died on 15 July 1817.

He wrote, De Ingenio Oratorio (Erlangen, 1770): — De Jobo Patientiam et Christunu Prcedicante (1771): — De Jobcei Libri Scopo (eod.): — Progr. in Versionem Syriacam ad 1 Timothy Epistolae (1776): — Ueber die Musik der alten Iebriier (1778): — Hebrmaische Grammatik (3d ed. 1802): — leue Uebersetzung des Propheten Hoseas (1785): — Philonis Judei Opera Omnia, etc. (1785-92, 5 volumes; 2d ed. 1820): — Progr. super Psalm 110 (1801): — Progr. super Psalm 72 (1803): — Bibliorum hebraicorum et Chaldceorum Mlanuale ad Prima Linguarum Studia Concinnavit (1809). See Doring, Die gelehrtens Theoloyen Deutschlands, s.v.; Furst, Bibl. Jud. 3:83; Winer, Handbuch der theol. Lit. 1:115, 45, 522. (B.P.)

This article incorporates public domain material from McClintock, John; Strong, James (1867–1887). Cyclopædia of Biblical, Theological and Ecclesiastical Literature. Harper and Brothers.
