= Henri Hyvernat =

Franco-American Coptologist, Semitist and orientalist

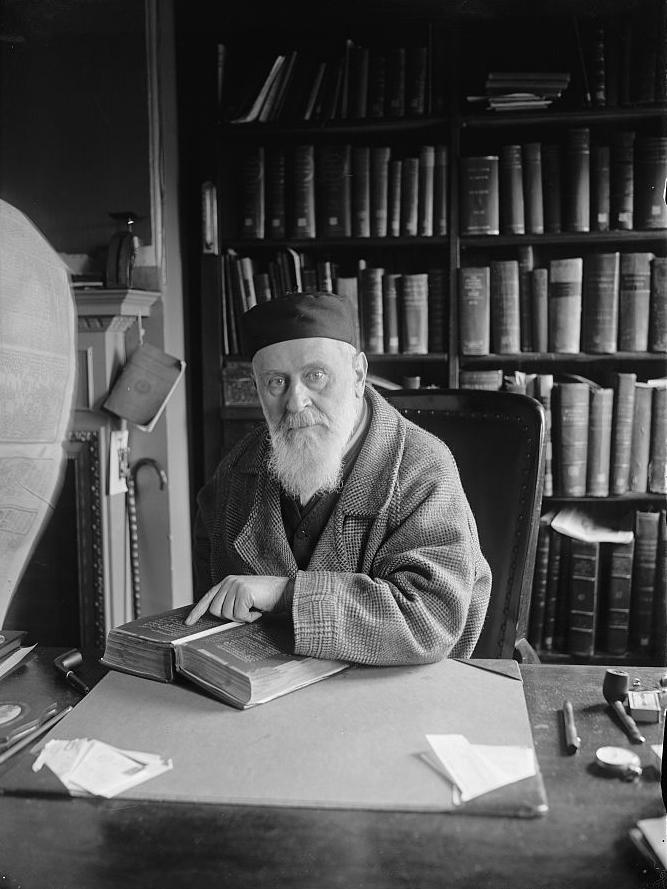
- Born: Henri Eugene Xavier Louis Hyvernat; 30 June 1858; Saint-Julien-en-Jarret, France
- Died: 29 May 1941 (aged 82); Washington, D.C., United States
- Occupation: Professor

Henri Eugene Xavier Louis Hyvernat (30 June 1858 – 29 May 1941) was a Franco-American Coptologist, Semitist and orientalist.

== Life ==
Henri Hyvnernat was born in Saint-Julien-en-Jarret (now part of L'Horme, Loire department) on 30 June 1858, the fifth of nine children of Claude and M. Leonide (née Meyrieux) Hyvernat. His father was a reporter at the Gazette de Lyon. He studied at the Séminaire de Saint Jean at Lyons and the University of Lyons. From 1882 to 1885, he taught theology at the Pontifical Universities in Rome.

In 1897, he was appointed the first professor and founding director of the Department of Oriental Studies at the Catholic University of America in Washington, D.C. In his research, he became interested in late antique, medieval and early modern history of the Christian Orient.

Hyvernat acquired a lot of literature, which today forms the core of the library of the Department of Semitic and Egyptian Languages and Literatures and the Institute of Christian Oriental Research. His research focuses on the heritage of the Christian-Eastern communities and is unique in the United States.

Hyvernat's work was connected with several discoveries of ancient Christian documents in Egypt in the 20th century, including the Coptic library in the monastery of St. Michael, besides the present territory of al-Hamuli in the Fayyum region of Egypt. This library has about 50 manuscripts from the 9th and 10th centuries. In 1911, this collection was purchased at the request of Hyvernat of the American banker John Pierpont Morgan. Hyvernat spent over 30 years studying and cataloging the Coptic library. A large facsimile edition, Bybliothecae Pierpont Morgan Codice photo graphice expressi 56 volumes in 63 parts (Rome, 1922), which was published under the direction of Hyvernat is today an important source of Coptic studies.

Henri Hyvernat died in Washington, D.C., on 29 May 1941.

== Works ==
- Album de Paleographie copte, pour servir a l' introduction of the actes des martyrs de l'Égypte, Leroux, Paris, 1888
- Les actes des martyrs de l'Égypte tires of manuscrits Coptes Vaticane et de la Bibliothèque du Musée Borgia, avec introd. et commentaires par Henri Hyvernat, Leroux, Paris, 1886
- Additis indicibus Totius operis, Corpus scriptorum Christianorum Orientalium; 125, Louvain, 1950
