= François Clément =

French historian

François Clement ([1714, Bèze, Côte-d'Or – 29 March 1793, Paris) was a French historian and member of the Benedictine Congregation of St. Maur.

== Biography ==
His first studies were at the college of the Jesuits in Dijon. Soon after his profession in 1731 his superiors sent him to the monastery of the "Blancs-Manteaux" in Paris.

He first worked on the preparations for volumes XI and XII of the Histoire littéraire de la France; these volumes covered the years 1141-1167 and were edited by Charles Clémencet. He then edited, in collaboration with Michel Jean Joseph Brial, a fellow Benedictine, volumes XII and XIII of the work begun by Bouquet in 1738, Recueil des historiens des Gaules et de la France (Paris, 1786), or as the title is generally given Scriptores rerum gallicarum et francicarum.

Clément's chief work is a revised edition of the chronology first issued by Clémencet in one volume, entitled: L'art de vérifier les dates des faits historiques. The new edition in which the original work appeared in an entirely changed form was published in Paris in 1770. A third edition (Paris, 1783–1787) embraced three folio volumes.

The unfinished work was completed by Nicolas Viton de Saint-Allais and appeared with additional matter in eighteen volumes (Paris, 1818–19). Viton de Saint-Allais also published from the literary remains of Clément the treatise L'art de vérifier les dates des faits historiques avant l'ère chrétienne (Paris, 1820).
