= Ferdinand Cavallera =

French theologian (1875–1954)

Ferdinand Cavallera (1875–1954) was born in Puy-en-Velay, France, of parents of Piedmontese origin. He joined the Society of Jesus in 1892 and became a biblical scholar, textual critic, and publisher on patristics.

== Life ==
Cavallera entered the Society of Jesus in 1892. In 1909 he became a theology professor and librarian at the Catholic Institute of Toulouse, where he taught for most of his life. He collaborated with Jesuit Fr. Joseph de Guibert in editing Revue d'ascétique et mystique after 1924 and became its editor from 1928 until his death. He also collaborated in producing the Dictionary of Ascetic and Mystical Spirituality in 1928 and edited the Catholic Institute review, Bulletin of Ecclesiastical Literature.

His research focused on patristics: he produced a doctoral dissertation (1905) on the schism of Antioch and on a sermon of Eustathius of Antioch. He also wrote on Saint Athanasius (1908) and produced indices of the Greek Patrologia Graeca of Jacques Paul Migne (1912) and of Christian doctrine (Thesaurus doctrinae catholicae ex documentas Magisterii ecclesiastici, 1920) which is similar to that of Denzinger. He published on the life and work of Saint Jerome, and questioned Jerome's authorship of some parts of the New Testament Vulgate. While teaching the social doctrine of the Church, he published a summary of the topic, in 1931 and 1937. He published articles on spiritual theology and its history, with at times a polemical stance employing categorical exclusives.

== Works ==
- Verzeichnis der Sigel für Handschriften und Kirchenschriftsteller. 1949.
- Die Alkuin-Bibel (Quartformat, 14 Seiten und 4 Tafeln) – Bestell-Nr. 00490, 1957.
- Lateinische Bibelhandschriften im frühen Mittelalter, 1915; hrsg. von Hermann Josef Frede (455 Seiten und 10 Tafeln) – 1985.
- Beiträge zur Geschichte der lateinischen Bibeltexte (mit einem Vorwort hrsg. von Hermann Josef Frede) (456 Seiten) – ISBN 3-451-00496-8, 1986.
- Die lateinischen Evangelien bis zum 10.Jahrhundert: I. Varianten zu Matthäus – Bestell-Nr. 00497, 1988
- Die lateinischen Evangelien bis zum 10.Jahrhundert: III. Varianten zu Lukas
