= Emmanuel Poulle =

French archivist and historian

- Born: 8 June 1928; Paris
- Died: 1 August 2011 (aged 82); Avranches
- Occupations: Archivist; Palaeographer

Emmanuel Poulle (8 June 1928 – 1 August 2011) was a French archivist and historian, specialist in the history of science and the medieval period and was a member of the Institut de France.

== Honours ==
He was an officier of the Légion d'honneur, commandeur of the Ordre des Palmes académiques and officier of the Ordre des Arts et des Lettres.

== Publications ==
- 1963: Un constructeur d'instruments astronomiques au XVe siècle, Jean Fusoris,
- 1963: La bibliothèque scientifique d'un imprimeur humaniste au XVe siècle
- 1966: La paléographie des écritures cursives en France du XVe au XVIIe siècle,
- 1967: Les instruments astronomiques du moyen age, reprinted in 1983
- 1980: Les instruments de la théorie des planètes selon Ptolemy : équatoires et horlogerie planétaire du XIIIe au XVIe siècle, 2 volumes
- 1984: Les Tables Aphonsines, avec les canons de Jean de Saxe
- 1987–1988: Johannis de Dondis, Paduani civis, Astrarium. I, Fac-simile del manoscritto di Padova e traduzione francese, II, édition critique de la version A
- 2003: Tractatus Astrarii de Giovanni Dondi dell'Orologio, introduction et traduction

Preceded by Jacques Monfrin	Director of the École Nationale des Chartes; 1988–1993	Succeeded by Yves-Marie Bercé
