= Bernard Carra de Vaux =

French orientalist (1867–1953)

- Born: February 5, 1867; Bar-sur-Aube
- Died: 1953 (aged 85–86); Nice
- Occupation: orientalist

Baron Carra de Vaux (5 February 1867, in Bar-sur-Aube – 1953, in Nice) was a French orientalist who published accounts of his travels in the Middle East.

== Books ==
- Carra de Vaux, Bernard, baron, 1867-: Avicenne (in French) (Gutenberg ebook)
- Carra de Vaux, Bernard, baron, 1867-: Avicenne / par le Bon. Carra de Vaux. (Paris : F. Alcan, 1900) (page images at HathiTrust; US access only)
- Carra de Vaux, Bernard, baron, 1867-: La langue étrusque; sa place parmi les langues. Étude de quelques textes, par B. Carra de Vaux. (Paris, H. Champion, 1911) (page images at HathiTrust; US access only)
- Carra de Vaux, Bernard, baron, b. 1867: Études d'histoire orientale. Le mahométisme; le génie sémitique et le génie aryen dans l'Islam, par le baron Carra de Vaux. (Paris, H. Champion, 1897) (page images at HathiTrust; US access only)
- Carra de Vaux, Bernard, baron, b. 1867: Istrumenti di regno de'pontefici re, con documenti posteriormente publicati dal segretario particolare del principe Napoleone. (Firenze, 1863) (page images at HathiTrust)
- Carra de Vaux, Bernard, baron, b. 1867: La doctrine de l'Islam, par Carra de Vaux. (Paris, G. Beauchesne, 1909) (page images at HathiTrust; US access only)
- Carra de Vaux, Bernard, baron, b. 1867: Le mahométisme; le génie sémitique et le génie aryen dans l'Islam, par le baron Carra de Vaux. (Paris, H. Champion, 1897) (page images at HathiTrust; US access only)
- Carra de Vaux, Bernard, baron, b. 1867: Rose e spine del pontificato romano; curiosi ed interessanti dettagli. (Firenze, Tip. Garibaldi, 1861) (page images at HathiTrust)
