= Brial =

Brial is a surname.

== List of people with the surname ==
- Aloisia Brial (died 1972), queen of Uvea
- Michael Brial (born 1970), Australian former rugby union player
- Sylvain Brial (born 1964), French politician

== See also ==
- Braille
