= Maurus Dantine =

Maurus Dantine (1688–1746) was a Belgian Benedictine of the Congregation of Saint-Maur and chronologist.

== Biography ==
He was born at Gonrieux near Namur on 1 April 1688. Like many of the members of his congregation he was one of the so-called Appelants who in 1713 did not accept the Papal Bull "Unigenitus", but appealed to a general council. He died in the monastery of the "Blancs-Manteaux" in Paris on 3 November 1746.

== Works ==
Dantine's chief merit is the work he did in chronology; he can, in reality, be called one of the founders of this branch of history, on account of the carefully elaborated plan he drew up for the great publication: "L'Art de vérifier les dates historiques, des chartes, des chroniques et autres monuments, depuis la naissance de J.-C.". He did most of the preparatory work for this publication, constructing more exact chronological tables and introducing a better method for calculating historical dates. Due to illness, he was unable to continue his labours and was obliged to leave their completion to other members of his order, his chief successor being Charles Clémencet.

He also devoted himself to linguistic studies and as a result of these published a translation with commentary of the Psalms under the title: "Les psaumes traduits sur l'hébreu avec des notes" (Paris, 1739). This work attracted so much attention that in the same year a second, and in the following year a third edition became necessary.

In collaboration with Pierre Carpentier he prepared a new edition of the great lexicon originally published in 1678 by Du Cange, and afterwards continued by the Maurists, its first Benedictine editor being Claude Guesnié, who was followed by Nicolas Toustain and Louis Le Pelletier.

The edition of Dantine and Carpentier, half as large again as that of Du Cange, appeared in six volumes at Paris, 1733–36, under the title: "Glossarium ad scriptores mediæ et infimæ latinitatis, editio locupletior operâ et studio monachorum O.S.B." The 1913 Catholic Encyclopedia praises the value of Dantine's edition for the knowledge of Latin and the study of law and morals in the Middle Ages.
