= Bibliotheca Hagiographica Latina =

Catalogue of Latin hagiographic materials

The Bibliotheca Hagiographica Latina (BHL) is a catalogue of Latin hagiographic materials, including ancient literary works on the saints' lives, the translations of their relics, and their miracles, arranged alphabetically by saint. The listings include manuscripts, incipits, and printed editions. The first edition (1898-1901) and supplement (1911) were edited by the Bollandists, which included the Jesuit scholar Hippolyte Delehaye. The most recent supplement is the product of a single editor, the Polish Jesuit Henryk Fros, also Bollandist.

The Bibliotheca Hagiographica Graeca and Bibliotheca Hagiographica Orientalis catalogue hagiography, respectively, written in Greek and Middle Eastern languages.

== Editions ==
- Bibliotheca hagiographica latina antiquae et mediae aetatis. Vol. 1. Brussels. 1898–1899. (A–J)
- Bibliotheca hagiographica latina antiquae et mediae aetatis. Vol. 2. Brussels. 1900–1901. (K–Z)
- Bibliotheca hagiographica latina antiquae et mediae aetatis. Supplementi editio altera auctior. Brussels. 1911.
- Fros, Henryk, ed. (1986). Bibliotheca hagiographica latina antiquae et mediae aetatis. Novum supplementum. Brussels: Société des Bollandistes. (Includes the contents of the 1911 supplement.)
- "Bibliotheca hagiographica latina manuscripta (BHLms)". 1998. Archived from the original on 1998-12-12. (Taken offline in 2024: link is to an archived version at the Internet Archive.)
- "Légendiers latins". 2024.

== See also ==
- Bibliotheca Hagiographica Graeca
- Bibliotheca Hagiographica Orientalis
