= Edmond Martène =

French Benedictine historian and liturgist

Edmond Martène (22 December 1654 – 20 June 1739) was a French Benedictine historian and liturgist.

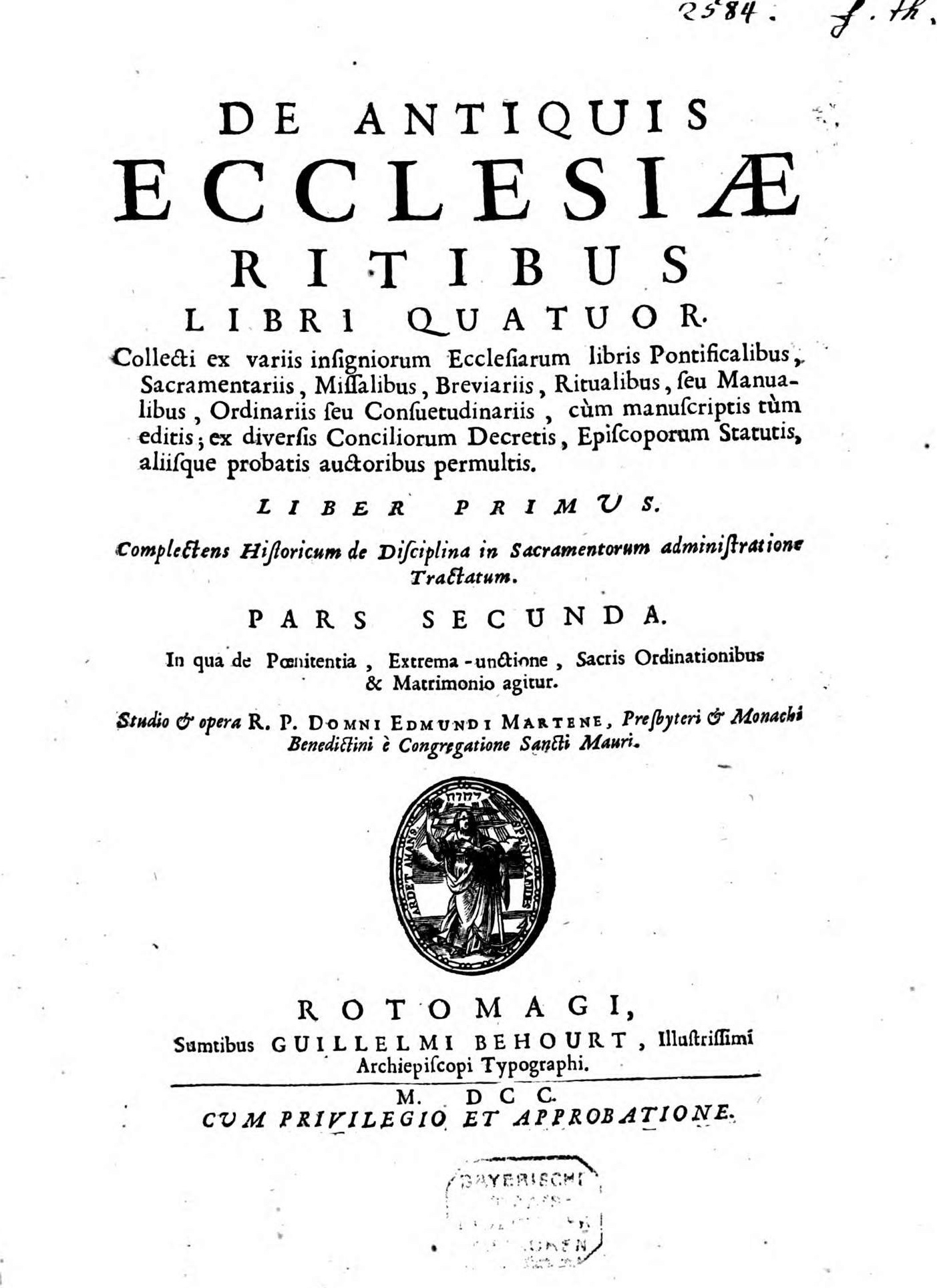
Edmond Martène: De antiquis ecclesiae ritibus, Rouen 1700

== Life ==
Martène was born at Saint-Jean-de-Losne near Dijon. In 1672 he entered the Benedictine Abbey of St-Rémy at Reims, a house of the Congregation of Saint Maur. Owing to his zeal for learning, however, he was sent to Saint-Germain to receive training under d'Achéry and Mabillon, and also to assist in the preliminary work connected with the new edition of the Church Fathers. Thenceforth he devoted his life to the study of subjects connected with history and liturgy, residing in various monasteries of his order, especially at Rouen, where he received the sympathetic co-operation of the prior of Sainte-Marthe.

Even in his student years he had gathered from widely various sources everything that might be helpful in elucidating the Rule of St. Benedict; the fruit of his labours he published in 1690 as Commentarius in regulam S. P. Benedicti litteralis, moralis, historicus ex variis antiquorum scriptorum commentationibus, actis sanctorum, monasticis ritibus aliisque monumentis cum editis tum manuscriptis concinnatus (Paris, 1690; 1695). During the same year he issued as a supplement to this: De antiquis monachorum ritibus libri 5 collecti ex variis ordinariis, consuetudinariis ritualibusque manuscriptis (Lyons, 1690; Venice, 1765). These were followed by other liturgical works.

In 1708 Martène and his fellow Benedictine, Ursin Durand, were commissioned to ransack the archives of France and Belgium for materials for the forthcoming revised edition of the Gallia Christiana, proposed by the prior of Sainte-Marthe. The numerous documents gathered by them from about eight hundred abbeys and one hundred cathedrals were incorporated in the abovementioned work or in the five volumes of the Thesaurus novus anecdotorum (Paris, 1717). The results of a journey made through the Netherlands and Germany for the purpose of documentary research were embodied by the two scholars in the nine folio volumes of Veterum scriptorum et monumentorum ecclesiasticorum et dogmaticorum amplissima collectio.(Paris, 1724–33). Finally, the sixth volume of the Annales Ordinis S. Benedicti (Paris, 1739) is the work of Martène alone.

Martène died at Saint-Germain-des-Prés near Paris.

== Works ==
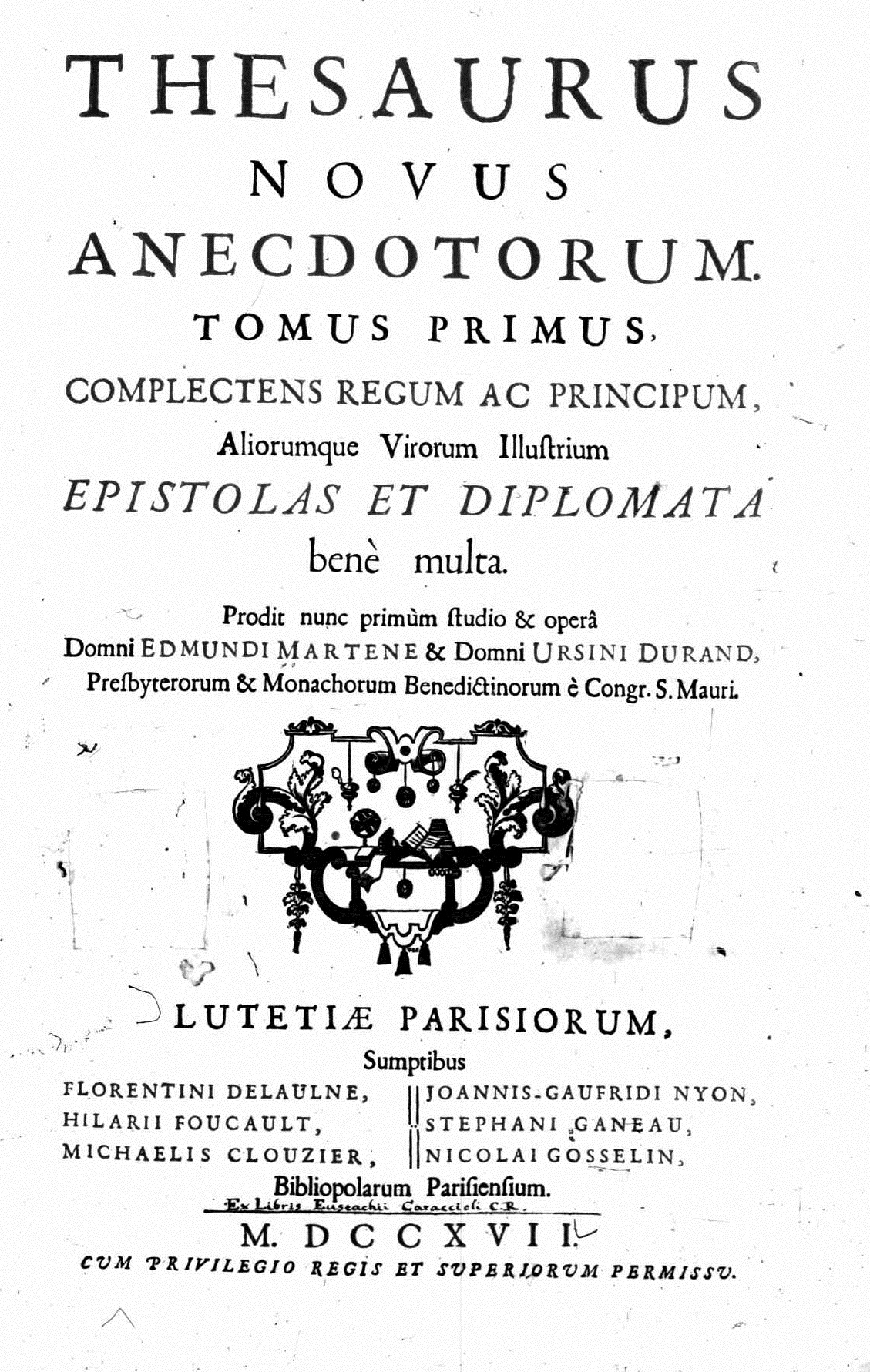
Thesaurus novus anecdotorum, 1717

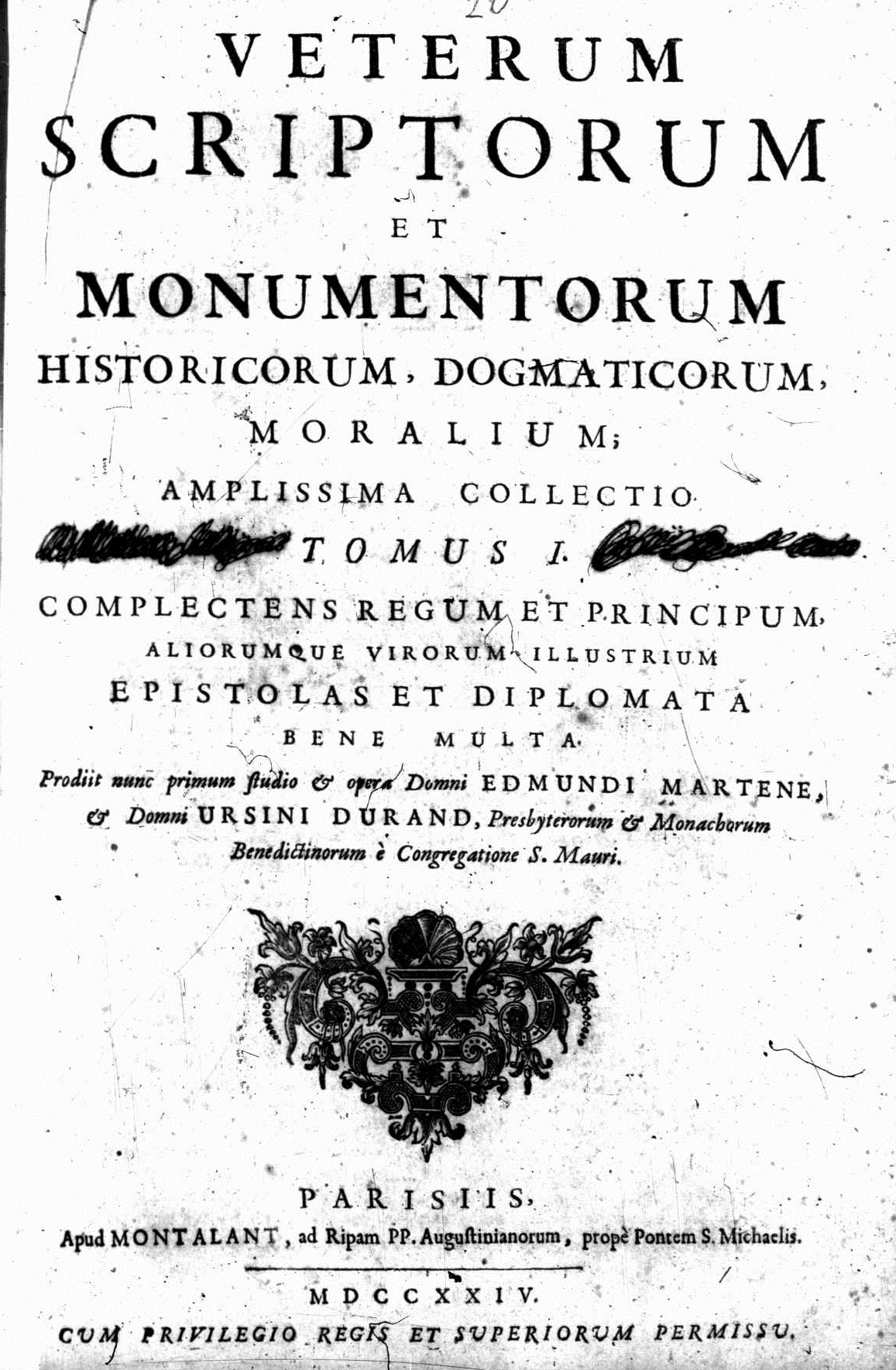
Veterum scriptorum et monumentorum historicorum, dogmaticorum, moralium amplissima collectio, 1724

- Commentarius in regulam S. P. Benedicti litteralis, moralis, historicus ex variis antiquorum scriptorum commentationibus, actis sanctorum, monasticis ritibus aliisque monumentis cum editis tum manuscriptis concinnatus, 1590; 1695.
- De antiquis monachorum ritibus libri V collecti ex variis ordinariis, consuetudinariis ritualibusque manuscriptis, Lyons, 1690 (about the history of liturgy).
- La vie du vénérable Claude Martin, religieux bénédictin, Tours, 1697; Rouen, 1698.
- De antiquis ecclesiæ ritibus libri IV, Rouen, 1700-1702.
- Tractatus de antiqua ecclesiæ disciplina in divinis officiis celebrandis, Lyons, 1706.
- Thesaurus novus anecdotorum, V volumi, Paris, 1717 (with Ursin Durand).
  - Thesaurus novus anecdotorum (in Latin). Vol. 2. Paris: Florentin Delaulne. 1717.
  - Thesaurus novus anecdotorum (in Latin). Vol. 4. Paris: Florentin Delaulne. 1717.
  - Thesaurus novus anecdotorum (in Latin). Vol. 5. Paris: Florentin Delaulne. 1717.
- De antiquis ecclesiæ ritibus editio secunda (4 vols., Antwerp, 1736-8; Venice, 1763-4; 1783; Bassano, 1788), in which he collected and expanded his earlier writings.
- Veterum scriptorum et monumentorum moralium, historicorum, dogmaticorum ad res ecclesiasticas monasticas et politicas illustrandas collectio, Rouen, 1700 (with Ursin Durand), is a continuation of the Spicilegium of Martène's teacher, Luc d'Achery.
  - Veterum scriptorum et monumentorum historicorum, dogmaticorum, moralium amplissima collectio (in Latin). Vol. 1. Paris: François Montalant. 1724.
  - Veterum scriptorum et monumentorum historicorum, dogmaticorum, moralium amplissima collectio (in Latin). Vol. 2. Paris: François Montalant. 1724.
  - Veterum scriptorum et monumentorum historicorum, dogmaticorum, moralium amplissima collectio (in Latin). Vol. 3. Paris: François Montalant. 1724.
  - Veterum scriptorum et monumentorum historicorum, dogmaticorum, moralium amplissima collectio (in Latin). Vol. 6. Paris: François Montalant. 1729.
  - Veterum scriptorum et monumentorum historicorum, dogmaticorum, moralium amplissima collectio (in Latin). Vol. 7. Paris: François Montalant. 1733.
  - Veterum scriptorum et monumentorum historicorum, dogmaticorum, moralium amplissima collectio (in Latin). Vol. 8. Paris: François Montalant. 1733.
- Imperialis Stabulensis monasterii jura propugnata adversus iniquas disceptationes, Cologne, 1730.
- Histoire de l'abbaye de Marmoutier, first edited in 1874 and 1875 by Ulysse Chevalier as Vols. XXIV and XXV of Mémoires de la Société archéologique de Touraine.
- Annales Ordinis S. Benedicti, Paris, 1739.
