= Bibliotheca Hagiographica Graeca =

Catalogue of Greek hagiographic materials

The Bibliotheca Hagiographica Graeca is a catalogue of Greek hagiographic materials, including ancient literary works on the saints' lives, the translations of their relics, and their miracles, arranged alphabetically by saint. It is usually abbreviated as BHG in scholarly literature. The listings include MSS, incipits, and printed editions. The first two editions (1895, 1909) were edited by the Bollandists, which included the Jesuit scholar Hippolyte Delehaye. The most recent editions have been the product of a single editor François Halkin. The BHG along with the Bibliotheca Hagiographica Latina and Bibliotheca Hagiographica Orientalis are the most useful tools in the research of literary documents concerning the saints.

== Editions ==
- Société des Bollandistes, ed. (1895). Bibliotheca hagiographica graeca; seu, Elenchus vitarum sanctorum. Brussels: Apud editories.
- Société des Bollandistes, ed. (1909). Bibliotheca hagiographica graeca. Subsidia Hagiographica. Vol. 8 (2nd ed.). Brussels: Société des Bollandistes.
- Halkin, François, ed. (1957). Bibliotheca hagiographica graeca. Subsidia Hagiographica. Vol. 8a (3rd ed.). Brussels: Société des Bollandistes. 3 volumes. Reprinted in 1986.
- Halkin, François, ed. (1969). Bibliotheca hagiographica graeca. Auctarium. Subsidia Hagiographica. Vol. 47. Brussels: Société des Bollandistes.
- Halkin, François, ed. (1984). Bibliotheca hagiographica graeca. Novum Auctarium. Subsidia Hagiographica. Vol. 65. Brussels: Société des Bollandistes.

== See also ==
- Bibliotheca Hagiographica Latina
- Bibliotheca Hagiographica Orientalis
