= Bibliotheca Hagiographica Orientalis =

Catalogue of oriental hagiographic materials

The Bibliotheca Hagiographica Orientalis ('Hagiographic Library of the Orient') is a catalogue of Arabic, Coptic, Syriac, Armenian, and Ethiopian hagiographic materials, including ancient literary works on the saints' lives, the translations of their relics, and their miracles, arranged alphabetically by saint. It is usually abbreviated as BHO in scholarly literature. The listings include MSS, incipits, and printed editions. The BHO along with the Bibliotheca Hagiographica Graeca and Bibliotheca Hagiographica Latina are the most useful tools in the research of literary documents concerning the saints.

== Editions ==
- Bibliotheca hagiographica orientalis, ed. Paul Peeters, Subsidia Hagiographica 10 (Bruxelles: Société des Bollandistes, 1910 [reprinted 1954, 1970]).

== See also ==
- Bibliotheca Hagiographica Graeca
- Bibliotheca Hagiographica Latina
