= List of Crusades historians (19th century) =

Authors of historical works about the Crusades written in the 19th century.

== The French school of historians ==
Silvestre de Sacy. Antoine Isaac Silvestre de Sacy (1758–1838), a French linguist and orientalist.

- Notice des Manuscrits laissés par Dom Berthereau, religieux bénédictin de la c. de S. Maur, mort en 1794 (1801). Notice concerning the oriental manuscripts collected by French orientalist George François Berthereau (1732–1792) for his unpublished Historiens des croisades (Historians of the Crusades).
- Specimen historiae arabum by Bar Hebraeus (1806). Observations of Arab history by Syriac historian Bar Hebraeus (1226–1286).
- Mémoire sur la dynastie des Assassins et sur l'origine de leur nom (1809). A short history of the Assassins. With a controversial discussion on the origins of their name, following Marco Polo's assertion that the name was derived from the use of hashish. De Sacy's work pointed to Islamic texts, but has been refuted by modern scholars including historians Bernard Lewis (1916–2018) and Farhad Daftary (born 1938).
- Account of Egypt (Relation de l'Égypte) (1810). By Arab historian Abd al-Latif al-Baghdadi (1162–1231). Arabic document first discovered and published by Edward Pococke (1604–1691). His son, Edward Pococke the Younger, then translated a fragment of the work into Latin. Thomas Hunt began the task of completing the translation but did not finish. The Latin translation was completed by Joseph White. The work was then translated into French, with valuable notes, by de Sacy.
- Mémoire sur une correspondance inédite de Tamerlan avec Charles VI (1822). Correspondence between Charles VI of France and Turco-Mongol commander Tamerlane (1336–1405). In Mémoires de l'Académie des Inscriptions, Volume VI.
- Les séances de Hariri, publiées en arabe avec un commentaire choisi by Ḥarīrī (1822). Translation of the work of Arab poet al-Harīrī (1030–1122). Second edition of 1847 edited by Joseph Derenbourg and Joseph Toussaint Reinaud.
- Recherches sur l'initiation à la secte des Ismaéliens (1824). A history of the Assassins (literally, the sect of Isma'ilis).
- Alfiyya: ou, La quintessence de la grammaire arabe, ouvrage de Djémal-eddin Mohammed, connu sous le nom d'Ebn-Malec (1833). Translation of Al-Alfiyya by Arab grammarian ibn Malik (1203–1274).
- Bibliothèque de M. le baron Silvestre de Sacy, 3 volumes (1846).

François Pouqueville. François C. H. L. Pouqueville (1770–1838), a French diplomat, writer, explorer, physician and historian.

- Voyage en Morée, à Constantinople, en Albanie, 3 volumes (1805).
- Travels through the Morea, Albania, and other parts of the Ottoman empire to Constaninople: during the years 1798, 1799, 1800, and 1801 (1806).
- Mémoire historique et diplomatique sur le commerce et les établissements français au Levant, depuis l'an 500 jusqu’à la fin du XVII siècle (1833).

Joseph François Michaud. Joseph François Michaud (1767–1839), a French historian and publisist, specializing in the Crusades. In 1830, he travelled to the Holy Land in order provide more realistic accounts of his Histoire. He was unable to complete the final edition.

- Histoire des Croisades, 3 volumes (1812–1822). Edited by his friend historian Jean J. F. Poujoulat (1808–1880). Updated to an improved edition with 4 volumes (or, 6 volumes in some printings) by Jean L. A. Huillard-Bréholles (Paris, 1862). A history of the Crusades that includes 40 appendices with original source material, primarily contemporary letters. Histoire has been regarded as the starting point of modern Crusades studies and it was under the influence of this publication that the Académie des Inscriptions et Belles-Lettres decided to publish the collection of historians of the Crusades in the Recueil des historiens des croisades. Translation published in 1881 (see below).
- Bibliothèque des Croisades, 4 volumes (1829). Bibliography of works on the Crusades, with French orientalist Joseph T. Reinaud (1795–1867).
- Nouvelle collection des mémoires pour servir à l'histoire de France, 32 volumes (1836–1844). Edited with Jean Poujoulat.
- Biographie universelle, ancienne et moderne, 45 volumes (1843–1865). Ou, Histoire, par ordre alphabétique, de la vie publique et privée de tous les hommes qui se sont fait remarquer par leurs écrits, leurs actions, leurs talents, leurs vertus ou leurs crimes.
- The History of the Crusades, 3 volumes (1852). Translated by British author William Robson (1785–1863). With a biographical notice on the author and preface and supplementary chapter by American essayist Hamilton W. Mabie (1846–1916). Covers the period 300–1095, the First through Eighth Crusades, attempted Crusades against the Turks from 1291–1396, Crusades against the Turks from 1453–1481, and commentary on the status of Europe from 1571–1685.
- History of the Crusades, 2 volumes (1875). An edition of Histoire des Croisades, translated by W. Robson, and illustrated by Gustave Doré (1832–1863) with 100 grand compositions.
- The Saracen (1810). Or, Matilda and Malek Adhel, a Crusade romance. From the French work of Mme. Sophie Cottin (1770–1807), with an historical introduction.

Jean Joseph François Poujoulat. Jean Joseph François Poujoulat (1808–1880), a French historian and journalist.

- Histoire des Croisades, 6 volumes (1812–1822). With Joseph François Michaud, updated by Jean L. A. Huillard-Bréholles (Paris, 1862).
- Nouvelle collection des mémoires pour servir à l'histoire de France, 32 volumes (1836–1844). With Joseph Michaud.
- Histoire de Richard Ier Cœur de Lion, duc d'Aquitaine et de Normandie, roi d'Angleterre (1837). A biography of Richard I of England.
- Histoire de Jérusalem (1840–1842). A religious and philosophical study.
- Histoire de la conquète et de l'occupation de Constantinople par les Latins (1868). An account of the sack and subsequent occupation of Constantinople by the Franks in 1204.
- Histoire des Croisades, abrégée à l'usage de la jeunesse (1883). Abridged version of Histoire des Croisades for juvenile readers.

Adrien-Jean-Quentin Beuchot. Adrien-Jean-Quentin Beuchot (1777–1851), a French bibliographer.

- Dictionnaire historique et critique de Pierre Bayl, 16 volumes (1820). New edition of the Dictionnaire Historique et Critique (Historical and Critical Dictionary ) begun by French philosopher and writer Pierre Bayle (1647–1706).

François Guizot. François Pierre Guillaume Guizot (1787–1874), a French historian, orator, and statesman who published a collection of original or transcribed documents, many of which are of particular relevance to the Crusades.

- Collection des mémoires relatifs à l'histoire de France, 31 volumes (1823–1835). Editor-in-chief, Guizot. Depuis la fondation de la monarchie française jusqu'au 13e siècle, avec une introduction, des supplémens, des notices et des notes. A collection of original (or translated) documents on the history of France from the founding of the French monarchy until the thirteenth century, with an introduction, supplements, notices and notes.
- Historical documents by Gregory of Tours, Einhard, Ermoldus Nigellus, Flodoard, Abbo II of Metz, Radolfus Glaber, Adelberon and Suger in Volumes 1-8 of Collection des mémoires.
- A French translation of Dei gesta per Francos by Guibert of Nogent (1055–1124); the autobiography of Guibert; and the biography of Bernard of Clairvaux by William of St-Thierry. In Volumes 9–10 of Collection des mémoires.
- Gesta Philippi Augusti by Rigord (c. 1150 – c. 1209); Gesta Philippi H. regis Francorum and the poem Philippide by William the Breton (c. 1165 – c. 1225); and the Latin epic Gesta Ludovici VIII by Nicholas of Bray, in Volumes 11–12 of Collection des mémoires.
- Chronicon, a universal history from Creation to 1300, by Guillaume de Nangis (died 1300), in Volume 13 of Collection des mémoires.
- Historia Albigensis, a chronicle of the Albigensian Crusade, by Peter of Vaux de Cernay (died c. 1218), in Volume 14 of Collection des mémoires.
- Cronica, a history of Catharism and the Albigensian Crusade by Guillaume de Puylaurens (1200–1274), in Volume 19 of Collection des mémoires.
- Historia Rerum in Partibus Transmarinis Gestarum by William of Tyre (1130–1186), in Volumes 16–19 of Collection des mémoires.
- Historia Hierosolymitanae expeditionis by Albert of Aachen (died after 1150), in Volumes 20–21 of Collection des mémoires.
- Historia Orientalis (Historia Hierosolymitana) by James of Vitry (1160/1170–1240), in Volume 22 of Collection des mémoires.
- The Deeds of Tancred in the Crusade by Ralph of Caen (1080 – after 1130) and Historia Hierosolymitana by Robert the Monk (1055–1122), in Volume 23 of Collection des mémoires.
- Gesta Francorum Iherusalem Perefrinantium by Fulcher of Chartres (c. 1059 – after 1128) and De profectione Ludovici VII in Orientem by Odo of Deuil (1110–1162) in Volume 24 of Collection des mémoires.
- The Ecclesiastical History of England and Normandy (1853–1856), in Bohn's Libraries. Translation of work by Orderic Vitalis, with introduction by Guizot and critical notice by Léopold V. Delisle (1826–1910). Also in Collection des mémoires, Volumes 25-27.
- Histories of the Normans by William of Jumièges (c. 1000 – after 1070) and William of Poitiers (c. 1020–1090), in Volumes 28–29 of Collection des mémoires.

Honoré de Balzac. Honoré de Balzac (1799–1850), a French novelist and playwright.

- Clotilde de Lusignan: ou, Le beau juif, 4 volumes (1823). A romance and historical novel about John II of Jerusalem, inspired by Scott's Ivanhoe. (cf. French Wikipedia, Clotilde de Lusignan)

Joseph Toussaint Reinaud. Joseph Toussaint Reinaud (1795–1867), a French orientalist.

- Notice sur la vie de Saladin: sultan d'Egypte et de Syrie (1824). A short biographical work on Saladin.
- Histoire de la sixième croisade et de la prise de Damiette (1826). An account of the Fifth Crusade and the siege of Damietta in 1218–1219.
- Bibliothèque des Croisades, 4 volumes (1829). A bibliography of the Crusades, with Joseph François Michaud.
- Extraits des historiens arabes (1829). Translation of Muslim works related to the Crusades.
- Géographie d'Aboulféda (1840). Translation of Taqwim al-Buldan (A Sketch of the Countries) by Kurdish historian and geographer Abu'l-Fida (1273–1331).
- Ancient accounts of India and China (1845). Edition of the very curious records of early Arab intercourse with China of which Eusèbe Renaudot had given but an imperfect translation in 1733.
- Fragments arabes et persans inédits relatifs à l'Inde, antérieurement au XIe siècle de l'ère chrétienne (1845). Unpublished Arab and Persian fragments relating to India prior to the eleventh century.
- Les séances de Hariri, publiées en arabe avec un commentaire choisi by Ḥarīrī, 2nd edition (1822, 1847). Translation of the work of Arab poet al-Harīrī (1030–1122). With French orientalist Antoine Isaac Silvestre de Sacy (1758–1838) and Franco-German orientalist Joseph Derenbourg (1811–1895).

Jean Alexandre Buchon. Jean Alexandre Buchon (1791–1849). a French historian.

- Collection des chroniques nationales français, 47 volumes (1824–1828): Works from the 13th through the 16th centuries:écrites en langue vulgaire du treizième au seizième siècle. Includes material relevant to the Fourth Crusade and Latin states in Greece. This includes Geoffrey of Villehardouin's chronicle De la Conquête de Constantinople, Robert de Clari's La Conquête de Constantinople, the Chronicle of Ramon Muntaner, and a new edition of du Cange's Histoire de l'empire de Constantinople sous les empereurs françois.
- Chronique de la conquête de Constantinople et de l'établissement des français en Morée (1825). Chronicle of the conquest of Constantinople and the establishment of the French in Morea.
- Recherches et matériaux pour servir à une histoire de la domination française: aux XIIIe, XIVe et XVe siècles dans les provinces démembrées de l'Empire Grec à la suite de la quatrième croisade, 2 volumes (1840). Research and materials to serve a history of French domination: in the 13th, 14th and 15th centuries in the dismembered provinces of the Greek Empire following the Fourth Crusade. Includes Histoire de l'empereur Henri de Constantinople (1210) by Henri de Valenciennes (fl. 13th century) and De la Conquête de Constantinople by Geoffrey de Villehardouin.
- Recherches historiques sur la principauté française de Morée (1845). Historical research on the French principality of Morée (Morea) and its high baronies. Conquest and feudal establishment from 1205–1333.
- Atlas des nouvelles recherches historiques sur la principauté française de Morée et ses hautes baronies fondées à la suite de la quatrième croisade (1845). Forming the second part of this work and serving as a complement to the historical, genealogical and numismatic clarification of the French principality of Morea and to the journey in Morea, mainland Greece, the Cyclades and the Ionian Island.

François Pouqueville. François Charles Hugues Laurent Pouqueville (1770–1838), a French diplomat and historian.

- Mémoire historique et diplomatique sur le commerce et les établissements français au Levant, depuis l'an 500 jusqu'à la fin du XVII siècle (1833). An account of the historical and diplomatic activities of French commerce and establishments in the Levant, from the year 500 through the end of the seventeenth century. In Mémoires de l'Institut de France, Volume X.

Nicholas Rudolphe Taranne. Nicolas Rudolphe Taranne (1795–1857), a French historian. Secretary to the Comité des travaux historiques et scientifiques from 1838 to 1857.

- Historia Francorum (1836). Translation of the sixth-century text of Gregory of Tours (538–594) in which chronicles events in the history of France from the Creation through his own term as Bishop of Tours.
- Histoire ecclésiastique des Francs, 2 volumes (1836).
- Les familles d'outremer (unpublished). Genealogy of the royal families of the Kingdom of Jerusalem through 1244. By the decree of the Minister of Public Instruction, 1854, the publication and completion of Du Cange's unfinished work was entrusted to Taranne. After the latter's death it was continued by Emmanuel Guillaume-Rey (1869).
- Répertoire biographique généalogique et historique des croisés et des familles établies dans les royaumes de Jérusalem, de Chypre et d'Arménie. Extension of Les familles d'outremer to 1291.

Alexis Paulin Paris. Alexis Paulin Paris (1800–1881), a French philologist and author.

- Grandes chroniques de France, 6 volumes (1836–1840). Alexis Paris, editor. Traces the history of the French kings from their origins in Troy to the death of Philip II of France (1223). Its final form brought the chronicle down to the death of Charles V of France in the 1380s. Source material included Historia Caroli Magni. andVita Karoli Magni.
- Oeuvres complètes du roi René, 4 volumes (1844). Editor of the works of René of Anjou (1409–1480), king of Naples and titular king of Jerusalem.
- La Chanson d'Antioche (edition 1848). Twelfth-century chanson de geste about the sieges of Antioch and Jerusalem. Original author identified as Ricard le Pèlerin and recast by Graindor de Douai. Mostly forgotten until 1848 when Alexis Paris published an edition translated by French politician Louis-Clair de Beaupoil comte de Saint-Aulaire (1778–1854). De Beaupoil also translated Goethe's Faust.
- Les historiens des croisades: discours d'ouverture du cours de langue et litterature du Moyen Age. The historians of the crusades: opening speech of the language course and literature of the Middle Ages.
- Les aventures de maître Renart et d'Ysengrin, son compère (1861). A version of the story of the fabled anthropomorphic Reynard the Fox. [Other versions include ones by Chaucer and Goethe.]
- Guillaume de Tyr et ses continuateurs: texte français du XIIIe siècle, 2 volumes (1879–1880). Translation of the Historia Rerum in Partibus Transmarinis Gestarum (History of Deeds Done Beyond the Sea) by Jerusalem-born historian William of Tyre (1130–1186).

Étienne Marc Quatremère. Étienne Marc Quatremère (1782–1857), a French orientalist.

- Recherches ... sur la langue et la littérature de l'Egypte (1808). A study of the language of ancient Egypt and its relationship with Coptic.
- Mémoires géographiques et historiques sur l'Égypte… sur quelques contrées voisines, 2 volumes (1811). The publication of Quatremère's Mémoires forced French orientalist Jean-François Champollion (1790–1832), decoder of the Rosetta stone, to prematurely publish an introduction to his L'Égypte sous les pharaons (1814). Since both works concerned the Coptic names of Egyptian towns, Champollion was incorrectly accused by some of plagiarism.
- History of the Ayyubit and Mameluke Rulers, 2 volumes (1837–1845). French translation of a work by Egyptian historian al-Makrizi (1364–1442).
- Prolégomènes d'Ebn-Khaldoun (1858). Editor of a translation of Al-Muqaddimah, the work on the universal history of empires, by Arab historian Ibn Khaldūn (died 1406).

Jean Louis Alphonse Huillard-Bréholles. Jean Louis Alphonse Huillard-Bréholles (1817–1871), a French archivist and historian. (cf. German Wikipedia, Alphonse Huillard-Bréholles)

- Grande chronique de Matthieu Paris, 9 volumes (1840–1841). An edition of the Grand chronique (also known as Chronica Majora) by English chronicler Matthew Paris (c. 1200–1259). Edited by Huillard-Bréholles. With an introduction by French nobleman Charles-Philippe d'Albert Duc de Luynes (1695–1758), who had also written a memoir of Louis XV of France.
- La grande chronique de Richard I Coeur de Lion 1189–1199 (1840). Volume 2 of Grande chronique de Matthieu Paris.
- Recherches sur les monuments et l'histoire des Normands et de la maison de Souabe dans l'Italie méridionale (1844),
- La fondation de la maison de Souabe dans l'italie méridionale (1844)
- Historia diplomatica Frederici secundi, 6 volumes (1852–1861). A history of the diplomacy of Frederick II, Holy Roman Emperor. Under the auspices of French nobleman Honoré Théodoric d'Albert de Luynes (1802–1867).
- Histoire des Croisades, 6 volumes (1849). Update of the classic work of Joseph F. Michaud (1767–1839).
- Vie et correspondance de Pierre de La Vigne (1864).
- Titres de la maison ducale de Bourbon (1866).

Recueil des historiens des croisades. A history of the Crusades that was begun by the Congregation of St. Maur in the eighteenth century by Dom George F. Berthereau. Publication was precluded by the French Revolution, but later turned into a general collection of Crusader sources for the Académie des Inscriptions et Belles-Lettres, resulting in the collection Recueil des historiens des croisades.

- Historians of the Crusades, 31 volumes (eighteenth century). Material from oriental authors collected by French orientalist George François Berthereau (1732–1792).
- Notice des Manuscrits laissés par Dom Berthereau, religieux bénédictin de la c. de S. Maur, mort en 1794 (1801). Notice by French orientalist Antoine Isaac Silvestre de Sacy (1758–1838) concerning the manuscripts collected by Dom Berthereau.
- Recueil des historiens des croisades, 16 volumes (1841–1906). Regarded as the best general collection of original Crusaders sources, containing many of the Latin, Arabic, Greek, Armenian and Syriac authorities, and also the text of the Assizes (laws).
- Inventaire des matériaux rassemblés par les Bénédictins au xviiie siècle pour la publication des historiens des croisades: Collection dite de Dom Berthereau (1882). An inventory of Berthereau's collection, edited by French historian Paul E. D. Riant (1836–1888).
- Les origines du recueil des "historiens des croisades" (1919). A study of the origins of Recueil des historiens des croisades, by French historian and geographer Henri Dehérain (1867–1941).

Auguste-Arthur Beugnot. Auguste-Arthur Beugnot (1797–1865), French historian and statesman.

- Assises de Jérusalem ou Recueil des ouvrages de jurisprudence composés pendant le XIIIe siècle dans les royaumes de Jérusalem et de Chypre, 2 volumes (1841–1843). A treatise on the Assizes of Jerusalem, in Recueil des historiens des croisades lois (RHC Lois).

Charles Defrémery. Charles Defrémery (1822–1883), a French orientalist, specializing in Arabic and Persian history and literature.

- Histoire des sultans du Kharezm, par Mirkhond. Texte persan, accompagné de notes historiques, géographiques et philologiques (1842). A translation of the work by Mīr-Khvānd concerning the Khwarazmian dynasty in the eleventh through thirteenth centuries.
- Histoire des Seldjoukides et des Ismaéliens ou assassins de l'Iran. Translation of a work by Persian historian Hamd-Allah Mustawfi (1281–1349)
- Recherches sur le règne de Barkiarok, sultan seldjoukide (485-498 de l'hégire: 1092–1104 de l'ère chrétienne) (1853). A biography of the Seljuk sultan Barkyaruq.
- Voyages d'Ibn Battuta, 4 volumes (1853–1859). A translation of the work of Moroccan explorer Ibn Battuta (1304–1369).
- Mémoires d'histoire orientale, suivis de Mélanges de critique, de philologie et de géographie (1854).
- Gulistan, ou le Parterre de roses, par Sadi, traduit du persan et accompagné de notes historiques, géographiques et littéraires (1858). A translation of the Gulistan (The Flower Garden), written in 1258, by Persian poet Saadi Shirazi (1210–1292).
- Mémoire sur cette question: Jérusalem a-t-elle été prise par l'armée du calife d'Égypte pendant l'année 1096 ou dans l'année 1098? (1872). A discussion on the Fatimid capture of Jerusalem in the late eleventh century.

Salles des Croisades. The Salles des Croisades (Hall of Crusades) opened at the Palace of Versailles in 1843 and houses over 120 paintings related to the Crusades. Historiographers of the Crusades frequently use the gallery to demonstrate their popularity in the nineteenth century.

Vincent-Victor Henri Viénot de Vaublanc. Vincent-Victor Henri Viénot de Vaublanc (1803–1874), a French writer and artist. (cf. French Wikipedia, Vincent-Victor Henri Viénot de Vaublanc)

- La France au temps des croisades: ou, Recherches sur les moeurs et coutumes des Français aus XIIe et XIIIe siècles, 4 volumes (1844–1847). Mores and customs of France at the time of the Crusades, twelfth and thirteenth centuries.
- Material for Literature from the Crusades (1904). An essay in Medieval Civilization: Selected Studies from European Authors, edited by Dana C. Munro.

Jacques Paul Migne. Jacques Paul Migne (1800–1875), a French priest and scholar.

- Patrologiae Cursus Completus. The collected works of Patrologia Latina and Patrologia Graeco-Latina.
- Patrologia Latina (MPL), 221 volumes (1844–1855). Writing of the Church fathers and other ecclesiastical writers from 230–1216 edited by Migne. Volume 155 is of particular interest to the Crusades, with biographical material on Godfrey of Bouillon, original texts, and other documents on the kingdom through 1250.
- Patrologia Graeco-Latina (MPG), 161 volumes (1857–1866). Edited by Migne and updated by Italian theologian Ferdinand Cavallera (1875–1954). Writing of the Church fathers and other secular writers in Greek from the third century to the fifteenth century.

Carl Benedict Hase. Carl Benedict (Charles-Benoît) Hase (1780–1864), a French Hellenist.

- Recueil des Itinéraires Anciens (1845). A collection of ancient routes including the Antonine Itinerary, the Tabula Peutingeriana and assorted Greek tours.
- Recueil des historiens des croisades historiens grecs, 2 volumes (1875–1881).

Thomas de Reiffenberg. Frédéric Auguste Ferdinand Thomas de Reiffenberg (1795–1850), a Belgian writer, historian-medievalist, and linguist.

- Chronique rimée de Philippe Mouskes, 2 volumes (1836–1838). An edition of Chronique rimée by Philippe Mouskes (before 1220–1282). Portions reprinted in In Itinéraires à Jérusalem et descriptions de la Terre Sainte...(1882) by French historian Henri-Victor Michelant (1811–1890).
- Le Chevalier au cygne et Godefroid de Bouillon: poëme historique, 3 volumes (1846–1854). An edition of Le Chevalier au cygne (Knight of the Swan).

Ludovic Lalanne. Ludovic Lalanne (1815–1898), a French historian and librarian.

- Les Pèlerinages en Terre Sainte avant les Croisades (1845). Pilgrimages to the Holy Land before the Crusades, with a chronology covering from Saint Helen’s in 325 (sic ) through Peter the Hermit in 1096. Used as a source for Tobler's Bibliographia Geographica Palestinæ (1867).
- Essai sur le feu grégeois et sur la poudre à canon (1845). An essay on Greek fire and gunpowder.

Honoré Théodoric d'Albert de Luynes. Honoré Théodoric d'Albert de Luynes (1802–1867), a French nobleman, archaeologist and numismatist.

- Essai sur la numismatique des Satrapies et de la Phénicie sous les rois Achæménides (1846).
- Numismatique et inscriptions cypriotes (1852).
- Voyage d'exploration à la mer Morte, à Petra et sur la rive gauche du Jordan (published posthumously).
- Catalogue de la Collection de Luynes, 3 volumes (1924).

René de Mont-Louis. René de Mont-Louis (1818–1883), a French historian who also wrote under the name Charles Farine.

- Histoire des Croisades (1846), writing as Charles Farine. Covering the First through Eighth Crusades, and the history of the Holy Land from 800–1453 and the influence of the Crusades on the West.
- La Croisade des enfant (1871). An account of the Children's Crusade of 1212.

Louis de Mas Latrie. Louis de Mas Latrie (1815–1897), a French historian specializing in medieval Cyprus.

- Monuments français existant dans l'île de Chypre (1850). In Journal général de l'instruction publique et des cultes, Tome 16 (1850).
- Inscriptions de Chypre et Constantinople (1850).
- Histoire de l'île de Chypre sous le règne des princes de la maison de Lusignan, 3 volumes (1852–1861). Includes Informatio ex parte Nunciorum Regis Cypri.
- Nouvelles Preuves del'Historie de Chypre, 3 works (1871–1874). Includes the anonymous fourteenth-century history of Cyprus Informatio ex parte Nunciorum Regis Cypri.
- Chronique d'Ernoul et de Bernard le Trésorier (1871). An edition of La Chronique d'Ernoul et de Bernard le trésorier (The Chronicle of Ernoul and Bernard the Treasurer), covering the Crusades over the period 1183–1197, by Ernoul (fl. 1187), a squire of Balian of Ibelin.
- La prise d'Alexandrie; ou, Chronique du roi Pierre Ier de Lusignan (1877). Edition of the fourteenth-century work of French poet Guillaume de Machaut (1300–1377), preface by Mas Latrie.
- De quelques seigneuries de Terre-Sainte (1878).
- Les Comtes de Jaffa et d'Ascalon du XIIe au XIXe siècle (1879).
- Chronique de l'Ile de Chypre (1884). Translation of Floria Bustron's Historia overo commentarii de Cipro.
- Les Seigneurs d'Arsur en Terre Sainte (1894).

Vivien de Saint-Martin. Louis Vivien de Saint-Martin (1802–1896), a French historian and geographer.

- Description historique et géographique de l'Asie Mineure, 2 volumes (1852). Historical and geographical description of Asia Minor, including ancient times, the Middle Ages and modern times, with a detailed account of the journeys that have been made in the peninsula, from the time of the Crusades to the most recent times. Preceded by a table of the geographical history of Asia, from the most ancient times to the present day. Used as a source for Bibliographia Geographica Palestinæ (1867) by Swiss orientalist Titus Tobler (1806–1877).

Jules Berger de Xivrey. Jules Berger de Xivrey (1801–1863), a French historian. (cf. French Wikipedia, Jules Berger de Xivrey)

- Mémoire sur la vie et les ouvrages de l'empereur Manuel Paléologue (1853). A memoir on the life and works of emperor Manuel II Palaiologus (1350–1425). In Mémoires de l'Institut de France, Volume XIX/2.

Léopold Victor Delisle. Léopold Victor Delisle (1826–1910), a French bibliophile and historian.

- The Ecclesiastical History of England and Normandy (1853–1856), in Bohn's Libraries. Translation of work by Orderic Vitalis, with introduction by François Guizot (1787–1874) and critical notice by Delisle.
- Mémoire sur les actes d'Innocent III: suivi de l'Itinéraire de ce pontifs (1857). An account of the correspondence and acts of pope Innocent III (1198–1216).
- Recueil des historiens des Gaules et de la France (RHF), 24 volumes (1869–1904). New edition of Martin Bouquet's classical work.
- Mémoire sur les ouvrages de Guillaume de Nangis (1873). A commentary on the works of French chronicler and biographer Guillaume de Nangis (died 1300).
- Mémoire sur les opérations financières des Templiers (1889). A memoir on the financial transactions of the Knights Templar.

Jean-François-Aimé Peyré. Jean-François-Aimé Peyré (1792–1868), a French historian.

- Histoire de la Première Croisade, 2 volumes (1859).

Louis-Alexandre Foucher de Careil. Louis-Alexandre Foucher de Careil (1826–1891), a French politician and author. (cf. French Wikipedia, Louis-Alexandre Foucher de Careil)

- Oeuvres de Leibniz, 7 volumes (1859–1875). A collection of original manuscripts of German mathematician Gottfried W. Leibniz (1646–1716). Includes Leibniz' proposal for a new Crusade against the Ottomans, the Project de conquête l'Egypte présenté à Louis XIV (1671).

Gustave Dugat. Gustave Dugat (1824–1894), a French orientalist.

- Histoire des orientalistes de l'Europe du XIIe au XIXe siècle, précédée d'une esquisse historique des études orientales, 2 volumes (1868–1870). A historical outline of the work of European orientalists.
- Histoire des philosophes et des théologiens musulmans (632–1258) (1878). A history of Islamic dynasties and scholars from the beginning until 1258.

Paul E. D. Riant. Paul E. D. Riant (1836–1888), a French historian specializing on the Crusades. (cf. French Wikipedia, Paul Riant).

- Expéditions et pèlerinages des Scandinaves en Terre sainte au temps des croisades, 2 volumes (1865–1869). Scandinavian expeditions and pilgrimages to the Holy Land during the Crusades.
- Hystoria de desolacione et conculcacione civitatis Acconensis et tocius Terre Sancte, in A. D. 1291 (1874). By Italian magister Thaddeus of Naples (fl. 1291). Edited by P. Riant.
- Notes sur les oeuvres de Gui de Bazaches (1877). Notes on the works of French cleric and Third Crusader Guy de Bazoches (before 1146–1203).
- La charte du maïs (1877). In Revue des questions historiques, Librairie de Victor Palmé, Volume XXI.
- Le changement de direction de la quatrième croisade: d'après quelques travaux récen. (1878). I in Revue des questions historiques, Librairie de Victor Palmé, Volume XXIII.
- Inventaire critique des lettres historiques des croisades, 768-1100 (1880). A collections of letters relevant to the Crusades, 768–1110.
- Un récit perdu de la première croisade (1882). Extrait du Bulletin de la Société nationale des Antiquaires de France, Séance du 19 avril 1882, pp. 203–212.
- Un dernier triomphe d'Urbain II (1883), in Revue des questions historiques, juillet 1883, XXXIV, pp. 247–255.
- La Part de l'évêque de Bethléem dans le butin de Constantinople en 1204, (1886).
- Les Possessions de l'église de Bethléem en Gascogne (1887).
- Exuviae Sacrae Constantinoploitanae (1877–1888). A collection of documents edited by Paul Riant relating to the status of relics at Constantinople before 1204 and their disposition after the Fourth Crusade. A further study La croix des premiers croisés; la sainte lance; la sainte couronne was published by Fernand de Mély in 1904.
- Études sur l'histoire de l'église de Bethléem, 3 volumes (1889, 1896).
- Catalogue de la bibliothèque de feu M. le comte Riant , 2 volumes (1896). A bibliography of the works of Count Riant.

Marie Henri d'Arbois de Jubainville. Marie Henri d'Arbois de Jubainville (1827–1910), a French historian.

- Livre des vassaux du comté de Champagne et de Brie 1172–1222 (1869). With Auguste H. Longnon (1844–1911).
- Recueil des actes de Philippe Ier, roi de France (1059–1108) (1908). With French archivist Maurice Prou (1861–1930).

Auguste Honoré Longnon. Auguste Honoré Longnon (1844–1911), a French historian and archivist.

- Livre des vassaux du comté de Champagne et de Brie 1172–1222 (1869). With Henry d'Arbois de Jubainville (1827–1910).

August Molinier. Auguste Molinier (1851–1904), a French palaeographer and historian.

- Catalogue des actes de Simon et d'Amaury de Montfort (1874). In Bibliothèque de l'École des chartes, Volume 34.
- Itinera hierosolymitana et descriptiones terrae sanctae bellis sacris anteriora (1879). Itineraries of pilgrimages to the Holy Land from the fourth through the eleventh century. Includes Bernard the Pilgrim (fl. 865), Saint Willibald (c. 700-c. 787), the Venerable Bede (c. 720), Arculf (fl. late seventh century), Theodosius' De situ terrae sanctae (530), Eucherius of Lyon (440), and Saint Paula of Rome (347-404) and her daughter Eustochium. Editor, with Swiss orientalist Titus Tobler (1806–1877) and archivist Charles A. Kohler (1854–1917).
- Description de deux manuscrits contenant la règle de la Militia passionis Jhesu Christi de Philippe de Mézières (1881). A description of two works by French knight Philippe de Mézières (c. 1327–1405)
- Les Sources de l'Histoire de France (des origines aux guerres d'Italie, 1494), 6 volumes (1901–1906). The sources of the history of France from the origins to the wars in Italy (1494).

Ernest Lavisse. Ernest Lavisse (1842–1922), a French historian nominated by the Nobel Prize in Literature five times.

- De Hermano Salzensi ordinis Teutonici magistro (1875). Dissertation for Doctor of Letters. A biography of Hermann von Salza (c. 1165–1239), fourth Grand Master of the Teutonic Knights.
- Ernest Lavisse et l'Histoire de l’Ordre teutonique (2004), by Gouguehneim Sylvain.

Gustave Doré. Paul Gustave Louis Christophe Doré (1832–1883) was a French artist, printmaker and illustrator.

- History of the Crusades, 2 volumes (1875). An edition of Joseph François Michaud's Histoire des Croisades, translated by William Robson. Illustrated by Gustave Doré with 100 grand compositions.
- Die Kreuzzüge und die Kultur ihrer Zeit (1884). The Crusades and the culture of their time, by Swiss writer Otto Henne am Rhyn (1828–1914). Illustrated by Gustave Doré with 101 plates.

Gabriel Hanotaux. Albert Auguste Gabriel Hanotaux (1853–1944), a French statesman and historian.

- Les Vénitiens ont-ils trahi la chrétienté en 1202 (1877). In Revue historique, Volume 4, 1877.

Henri Vast. Henri Vast (1847–1921), a French historian.

- Le Cardinal Bessarion (1403–1472), étude sur le chrétienté et la renaissance vers le milieu du XVe siècle (1878). A biographical study of cardinal Bessarion (1403–1472).
- Petite histoire de la grande guerre (1920). Translation, A Little History of the Great War, by Raymond Weeks (1863–1954).

Clément Huart. Clément Huart (1854–1926), a French orientalist and translator of Persian, Turkish and Arabic documents.

- La poésie religieuse des Nosaïris (1880). Contains several fragments of poetry in Arabic and French translation.
- A History of Arabic Literature (1903). Translated by Lady Mary S. Loyd (1853–1936).

Ulysse Robert. Ulysse Robert (1845–1903), a French archivist.

- Supplément à l'Histoire littéraire de la Congrégation de Saint-Maur (1881). A supplement to Histoire littéraire de la congregation de Saint-Maur by René-Prosper Tassin (1697–1777).
- Histoire du Pape Calixte II (1891). A history of pope Callixtus II (served 1119–1124).

Gaston Raynaud. Gaston Raynaud (1850–1911), a French historian.

- Itinéraires à Jérusalem et descriptions de la Terre Sainte, rédigés en français aux XIe, XIIe [et] XIIIe siècles (1882). With French medievalist Henri-Victor Michelant (1811–1890).
- Les gestes des Chiprois: recueil de chroniques françaises écrites en Orient au XIIIe & XVIe siècles (1887). Translation for the Société de l'Orient latin by Raynaud. Raynaud's version of Les gestes des Chiprois is found in both RHC Documents arméniens (1869–1906), Volume 2.VI, and Revue de l'Orient Latin (ROL), Volumes XIIIe, XIVe.
- An edition of the Annales de Terre Sainte, 1095–1291 (1884). With German historian Reinhold Röhricht (1842–1905). The Annales de Terre Sainte is a series of chronological entries recounting the history of the Crusades and the Latin East from 1095–1291. The Annales tradition proved popular enough that it was copied into a number of compilation manuscripts, such as the Gestes des Chiprois.

Étienne Antoine Vlasto. Étienne Antoine Vlasto (1831–?), a French historian.

- 1453: Les derniers jours de Constantinople (1883). The last days of Constantinople: End of the reign of John VIII Palaiologos; new attempts to bring about the union of the two churches; advent of Constantine XI Palaiologos; the siege and capture of Constantinople. (Fin du règne de Jean Paléologue, nouvelles tentatives pour amener l'union des deux églises, avènement de Constantin Paléologue, siège et prise de Constantinople{.

Léon Gautier. Émile Théodore Léon Gautier (1832–1897), a French literary historian.

- La Chevalerie (1884). A comprehensive study of chivalry and its history, renown for its length and lavish drawings. Illustrated by Luc-Olivier Merson (1846–1920), Édouard François Zier (1856–January 1924) and Michał Elwiro Andriolli (1836–1893).
- Bibliographie des chansons de geste, 1 volume (1897). A bibliography of works related to chanson de geste.

Jules Tessier. Jules Tessier (1836–1908), a French historian.

- Quatrième croisade: la diversion sur Zara & Constantinople (1884).

Geoffroi Jacques Flach. Geoffroi Jacques Flach (1846–1919), a French historian.

- Les origines de l'ancienne France, Xe et XIe siècles, 4 volumes (1886–1918). A history of France in the tenth and eleventh centuries.
- Chivalry (1904). Essay in Medieval Civilization: Selected Studies from European Authors, edited by Dana C. Munro.

Henri de Curzon. Henri de Curzon (1861–1942), a French historian, musicologist and archivist. (cf. French Wikipedia, Henri de Curzon)

- La règle du Temple (1886). The rules of the Order of the Temple, directly inspired by those of Bernard of Clairvaux (1090–1153) that were established after the Council of Troyes (1129). Published by the Société de l'histoire de France. (cf. French Wikipedia, Règle et statuts de l'ordre du Temple).

Bibliothèque des Écoles françaises d'Athènes et de Rome. Bibliothèque des Écoles françaises d'Athènes et de Rome (BEF) 336 volumes (1887–1960). The Library of the French schools of Greece and Rome. A collection of historical documents that includes the Registres des Popes.

Gabriel Mailhard de La Couure. Gabriel Mailhard de La Couture (19th century), a French writer.

- Godefroy de Bouillon et la Première Croisade.

Albert Lecoy de La Marche. Albert Lecoy de La Marche (1839–1897), a French historian.

- La Prédiction de la Croisade au Theizième Siècle (1890), in Revue des questions historiques 48 1890. Preaching a Crusade in the thirteenth century.

Émile Bouchet. Émile Bouchet (1848-19...), a French historian.

- La Conquête de Constantinople, 2 volumes (1891). A translation of Geoffrey of Villehardouin's (1150–1215) chronicle De la Conquête de Constantinople.

Élie Berger. Élie Berger (1850–1925), a French palaeographer and archivist.

- Saint Louis et Innocent IV: étude sur les rapports de France et du Saint-siège (1893).

Eugène Jarry. Eugène Jarry (1865–1940), a French paleographer and archivist.

- Le retour de la croisade de Barbarie (1390) (1893). An account of the Barbary Crusade of 1390. In Bibliothèque de l'École des Chartes, Volume 54.

Henri-François Delaborde. Henri François, comte Delaborde (1854–1927) a French historian. (cf. French Wikipedia, Henri-François Delaborde)

- Jean de Joinville et les seigneurs de Joinville, suivi d'un catalogue de leurs actes (1894).

Gaston Dodu. Gaston Dodu (1863–1939), a French historian.

- Histoire des institutions monarchiques dans le Royaume latin de Jérusalem, 1099–1291 (1894).

Charles Farcinet. Charles Farcinet (1824–1903), a French historian and numismatist.

- Mélanges de numismatique et d'histoire (1895). Mixtures of numismatics and history. The feudal coins of Poitou.
- Les anciens sires de Lusignan (1897). The former lords of Lusignan, Geoffroy la Grand'Dent (Geoffrey II of Lusignan) and the counts of La Marche: historical research on the Middle Ages in Poitou. Includes the Testament on Geoffrey II of Lusignan (1198–1247), by Jean Besly.

Jean-Barthélemy Hauréau. Jean-Barthélemy Hauréau (1812–1896), a French historian, journalist and administrator. From 1969 to 1893, he was editor-in-chief of Histoire littéraire de la France.

- Raimond Lulle, in Histoire littéraire de la France, Tome XXIX (1895). A biographical account of Ramon Lull (1232/1236–1315).

Abbé A. Parraud. Abbé A. Parraud (fl. later nineteenth century), a French cleric.

- Vie de saint Pierre Thomas, de l'ordre des carmes, fervent serviteur de Marie, patriarche titulaire de Constantinople, légat de la croisade de 1365 (1895). A biography of saint Peter Thomas (1305–1366), a participant in the Alexandrian Crusade of 1365. In Journal général de l'imprimerie et de la librairie, Volume 84.

Charles Clermont-Ganneau. Charles Simon Clermont-Ganneau (1846–1923), a French orientalist and archaeologist.

- Etudes d'Archéologie Orientale, 2 volumes (1895–1897).

Marcel Schwob. Mayer André Marcel Schwob (1867–1905), a French symbolist writer.

- La Croisade des Enfants (1896). A novella about the Children's Crusade of 1212. Mixes history with fiction through the voices of eight different protagonists: a goliard, a leper, pope Innocent III, a cleric, a qalandar, pope Gregory IX and two of the marching children.

David Léon Cahun. David Léon Cahun (1841–1900), a French traveler, orientalist and writer.

- Introduction à l'histoire de l'Asie: Turcs et Mongols, des origines à 1405 (1896).

Louis Petit. Louis Petit (1868–1927), a French orientalist, founder of l'Institut d'etudes Byzantines.

- Les Confréries Musulmanes (1899). A history of Islamic dynasties.
- Sacrorum Conciliorum nova et amplissima collectio, 53 volumes (1901–1927). First published in 31 volumes (1759–1798) by Giovanni D. Mansi (1692–1769). Continued by L. Petit and Abbé Jean Baptiste Martin (1864–1922). Extensive edition of Church councils from the First Council of Nicaea in 325 through the Council of Florence in 1438. Includes the Canons of the Council of Clermont. and other source material relevant to the Crusades.

== English historians and other authors ==
James Bland Lamb. Sir James Bland Lamb, 1st Baronet (1752–1824), born James Burges, a British author, barrister and Member of Parliament.

- Richard the First: a poem in eighteen books. 2 volumes (1801).
- Dramas, 2 volumes (1817). Includes the plays The Knight of Rhodes and The Crusades.

Thomas Johnes. Thomas Johnes (1748–1816), an English politician, farmer, printer, writer and translator.

- Memoirs of the Life of Froissart (1801). A biography of Belgian historian Jean Froissart (c. 1337 – c. 1405) by Jean-Baptiste de La Curne de Sainte-Palaye (1697–1781). Edited with acomplete index by T. Johnes.
- Chronicles of England, France and the Adjoining Countries by Jean Froissart (c. 1337 – c. 1405), 5 volumes (1803–1810). From the latter part of the reign of Edward II to the coronation of Henry IV. (Froissart's Chronicles). Edited by Johnes and Jean-Baptiste de La Curne de Sainte-Palaye (1697–1781).
- Memoirs of John Lord de Joinville, Grand Seneschal of Champagne, 2 volumes (1807). Edited by T. Johnes. Includes Life of Saint Louis (1309) by Jean de Joinville; Notes and Dissertations by Charles du Cange (1610–1688); Dissertation on Louis IX of France by Jean-Baptiste de La Curne de Sainte-Palaye (1697–1781); and Dissertation on the Assassins of Syria by Camille Falconet (1671–1762).
- The Travels of Bertrandon de La Brocq́uière to Palestine, and his return from Jerusalem overland to France, during the years 1432–1433 (1807). Translation of Bertrandon de la Broquière's Voyage d'Outremer. With a lengthy introductory discussion on travels and pilgrimage to the Holy Land, and a critique of the later Crusades.
- The Chronicles of Enguerrand de Monstrelet, 4 volumes (1809). Translated and edited by T. Johnes
- Chronicles of the Crusades (1848), in Bohn's Libraries. Two contemporary narratives of the Crusade of Richard Coeur de Lion, by Richard of Devizes and by Geoffrey de Vinsauf; and one of the Crusade at Saint Louis, by Lord Jean de Joinville. Edited and translated by Thomas Johnes (1748–1816).

Robert Walpole. Robert Walpole (1781–1856), an English classical scholar.

- Remarks Written at Constantinople (1802).
- Memoirs Relating to European and Asiatic Turkey, 2 volumes (1817).
- Travels in Various Countries of the East, 2 volumes (1820). Edited by R. Walpole.

Henry Ellis. Sir Henry Ellis (1777–1869), an English antiquarian, once principal librarian at the British Museum.

- The New Chronicles of England and France, in two parts (1811). By Robert Fabyan (died 1513). Named by himself The concordance of histories. Reprinted from Pynson's edition of 1516. The first part collated with the editions of 1533, 1542, and 1559; and the second with a manuscript of the author's own time, as well as the subsequent editions: including the different continuations. To which are added a biographical and literary preface, and an index.
- A General Introduction to Domesday Book (1813). A description of the 1086 Domesday Book, accompanied by indexes of the tenants-in-chief, and under-tenants, at the time of the survey: as well as of the holders of lands mentioned in Domesday anterior to the formation of that record: with an abstract of the population of England at the close of the region of William the Conqueror, so far as the same is actually entered. Illustrated by numerous notes and comments.
- The Pylgrymage of Sir Richard Guylforde to the Holy Land, A.D. 1506 (1851). Edited by H. Ellis.
- Chronica Johannis de Oxenedes (1859). An edition of the late 13th century chronicle Chronica Johannis de Oxenedes.

John Taaffe. John Taaffe (1787–1862), an English historian and Knight Commander of the Sovereign Order of St. John of Jerusalem.

- Padilla: A tale of Palestine (1815). A fictional account of chivalry in the time of Saladin. An account of a Spaniard at Tiberias in 1187, shortly after the fall of Jerusalem.
- A comment on the Divine comedy of Dante Alighieri (1822). Commentary on Dante's Divine Comedy.
- The History of the Holy, Military, Sovereign Order of St. John of Jerusalem: or, Knights Hospitallers, Knights Templars, Knights of Rhodes, Knights of Malta, 4 volumes (1852). Includes the account of commander Pierre d'Aubusson.
- History of the Order of Malta (1852).

Charles Mills. Charles Mills (1788–1826), an English historian.

- History of Mohammedanism (1817). A biography of the prophet of Mohammad, and an account of the caliphates and sultanates subsequently founded. Includes an inquiry into the theological, moral, and judicial codes of Islam, and their literature and sciences, with a view of the present extent and influence of Islam. French edition Histoire du Mahométisme, published in 1825.
- History of the Crusades for the Recovery and Possession of the Holy Land, 2 volumes (1820). A complete history of nine Crusades (the first eight numbered), with pre-Crusades material and commentary. Mills praises the works of Thomas Fuller and Sharon Turner, but disparages Gibbon's work as superficial. Volume 1 covers the First and Second Crusades, with no mention of the Crusade of 1101, and does not paint a good picture of the Western invaders of the Holy Land. Volume 2 covers the Third through Eighth Crusades, plus Lord Edward's Crusade and the loss of Acre.
- The travels of Theodore Ducas, 2 volumes (1822). Subtitled: In various countries in Europe at the revival of letters and art. An imaginary voyage of Theodore Ducas, written in imitation of the Travels of Anacharsis. Only the first part, comprising Italy, was published
- History of Chivalry; Knighthood and its times, 2 volumes (1825).

Sir Walter Scott. Sir Walter Scott (1771–1832), a Scottish novelist and historian.

- Ivanhoe, 3 volumes (1820)
- Tales of the Crusaders (1825), includes the novels: The Betrothed and The Talisman.
- Count Robert of Paris (1832). A novel set in Constantinople during the buildup of the First Crusade that centers on the relationship between Crusading forces and emperor Alexius I Comnenus.
- Chivalry (1842), in Encyclopædia Britannica, 7th Edition. Volume 6, pp. 592–617.
- Essays on Chivalry and Romance, in Edward Gibbon's The Crusades, AD 1095–1261 (1869).
- Introduction to The Castle of Otranto, by English writer Horatio Walpole (1719–1797), describing it as the "first modern attempt to found a tale of amusing fiction upon the basis of the ancient romances of chivalry."

Thomas Love Peacock. Thomas Love Peacock (1785–1866), an English novelist, poet, and official of the East India Company.

- Maid Marian (1822). A tale of Robin Hood taking place in the twelfth century, giving satirical look at the romantic medievalism of the Young England movement and Richard the Lionheart. Edited by English scholar Richard Garnett (1835–1906) in a later edition.
- Crotchet Castle (1831, 1837). A novel where the protagonist is diverted from his interest in the Third Crusade by a love interest.

Eleanor Anne Porden. Eleanor Anne Porden (1795–1825), a British Romantic poet.

- Cœur de Lion, or The Third Crusade. A poem, in sixteen books, 2 volumes (1822).

George Procter. Major George Procter (1795–1842), an English historian.

- The lucubrations [meditations] of Humphrey Ravelin (1823). Late major in the * * regiment of infantry.
- The history of Italy (1844). From the fall of the Western empire to the commencement of the wars of the French revolution.
- History of the Crusades (1854). Comprising the rise, progress and results of the various extraordinary European expeditions for the recovery of the Holy Land from the Saracens and Turks. A discussion of the causes of the wars and the numbered eight Crusades, with commentary on consequences; and 150 original illustrations.

Henry Stebbings. Henry Stebbings (1799–1883), an English historian and editor.

- History of Chivalry and the Crusades, 2 volumes (1829–1830). Volumes 50-51 of Constable's Miscellany, 80 volumes (1826–1834). A discussion of chivalry and history of the first seven Crusades. Volume 2 begins with the death of Godfrey of Bouillon.
- The surprising adventures of Robinson Crusoe (1838). An edition of Robinson Crusoe, with 22 plates and a life of the author Daniel Defoe.
- The Christian in Palestine, or Scenes of Sacred History (1847). Subtitled, to illustrate sketches taken on the spot by English artist William Henry Bartlett (1809–1854).

Henry Hallam. Henry Hallam (1777–1859), an English historian.

- View of the State of Europe during the Middle Ages (1818). Historical dissertations for the fifth through fifteenth centuries for France, Italy, Spain, Germany, and the Greek and Muslim empires. Includes major institutional features of medieval society, the feudal system, the ecclesiastical system, and the political system of England. A final chapter discussed society, commerce, manners, and literature in the Middle Ages.
- L'Europe au Moyen Age, 3 volumes (1821–1822). French edition of View of the State of Europe during the Middle Ages, translated by P. Dudoit and A. R. Borghers.
- Chivalry (1869), in Gibbon's The Crusades.

G. P. R. James. George Payne Rainsford James (1799–1860), an English novelist and historical writer, holding the honorary office of British Historiographer Royal.

- The History of Chivalry (1830). An account of the Crusades, beginning with the rise of chivalry. Includes: the first three Crusades, with vivid descriptions of the major battles; the death of Saladin; the later Crusades and the loss of Acre; the decline of the military orders.
- The History of Charlemagne (1833).
- A History of the Life of Richard Coeur-de-Lion, King of England (1842).

William Martin Leake. William Martin Leake (1777–1860), an English officer, topographer, diplomat, antiquarian and author.

- Travels in the Morea: With a map and plans, 3 volumes (1830).
- Travels in Northern Greece, 4 volumes (1835).
- Peloponnesiaca: A Supplement to Travels in the Morea (1846).

Ellis Cornelia Knight. Ellis Cornelia Knight (1757–1837), an English gentlewoman, traveler and writer.

- Sir Guy de Lusignan: a Tale of Italy, 2 volumes (1833). A fictional account of Lord Edward's Crusade of 1271–1272 and the assassination attempt on Edward's life.

Thomas Keightley. Thomas Keightley (1789–1872), an Irish writer known for his works on mythology and folklore.

- The Crusaders: or, Scenes, Events, and Characters, from the times of the Crusades, 2 volumes (1834).

Thomas Duffus Hardy. Sir Thomas Duffus Hardy (1804–1878), an English archivist and antiquary.

- Gesta Regum Anglorum, 2 volumes (1840). An edition of Gesta Regum Anglorum (Deeds of the Kings of the English) by English historian William of Malmesbury (1095–1143). Includes an account of the White Ship disaster of 1120 which claimed the lives of over 140 knights and noblemen, including First Crusader Ralph the Red of Pont-Echanfray.
- Rerum britannicarum medii aevi scriptores (Rolls Series), 253 volumes 1858–1911. Begun by Hardy and British archivists John Romilly (1802–1874), Joseph Stevenson (1806–1895). A collection of British and Irish medieval chronicles, archival records, legal tracts, folklore and hagiographical materials.

Richard Harris Barham. Richard Harris Barham (pseudonym Thomas Ingoldsby) (1788–1845), an English cleric, a novelist and a humorous poet.

- The Ingoldsby Legends, 2 volumes (1840, 1842, 1847). A collection of myths, legends, ghost stories and poetry. Several of the entries deal with the Crusades, including A Lay of St Nicholas; The Lord of Thoulouse: a legend of Languedoc; and The Lay of the Old Woman Clothed in Grey: a legend of Dover.

Edward Robinson. Edward Robinson (1794–1863), an American Biblical scholar, known as the "father of Biblical geography."

- Biblical Researches in Palestine, Mount Sinai and Arabia Petraea, 3 volumes (1841). An archaeological survey of nineteenth-century Palestine, the Sinai and the former Roman province of Arabia Petraea, including Jordan and the southern Levant.
- Supplement to Biblical Researches in Palestine (1842).

John Breakenridge. John Breakenridge (1820–1854), an English poet.

- The Crusades, and other Poems (1846). A collection of poems about the events of the Crusades, biblical events and other topics. With an interesting commentary on sources for the Crusader poems.

Henry George Bohn. Henry George Bohn (1796–1884), a British publisher.

- Bohn's Libraries (1846–1884). Editions of standard works and translations, dealing with history, science, classics, theology and archaeology.
- Chronicles of the Crusades (1848), in Bohn's Libraries. Two contemporary narratives of the Crusade of Richard Coeur de Lion, by Richard of Devizes and by Geoffrey de Vinsauf; and one of the Crusade at Saint Louis, by Lord John de Joinville . Edited and translated by Thomas Johnes (1748–1816).
- The Ecclesiastical History of England and Normandy (1853–1856), in Bohn's Libraries. Translation of work by Orderic Vitalis, with introduction by François Guizot (1787–1874) and critical notice by Léopold V. Delisle (1826–1910).

Benjamin Disraeli. Benjamin Disraeli, 1st Earl of Beaconsfield (1804–1881), a British politician and prime minister of the United Kingdom from 1874 to 1880.

- Tancred, or the New Crusade (1847). A novel about an idealistic young noble, Tancred, who leave his parents and retraces his ancestors to the Holy Land. Edition of 1904 edited by Bernard N. Langdon-Davies. Discussed in Elizabeth Siberry's Images of the Crusades.

John Mason Neale. John Mason Neale (1818–1866), an English Anglican priest, scholar and hymnwriter.

- Stories of the Crusades: I. De Hellingley. II. The Crusade of S. Louis (1848). The first part concerns a knight Sir Rainald de Hellingley in the time of Baldwin IV of Jerusalem. The second part, Lord Edward's Crusade.

John Kitto. John Kitto (1804–1854), an English Biblical scholar.

- The History of Palestine (1850). From the patriarchal age to the present time with introductory chapters on the geography and natural history of the country, and on the customs and institutions of the Hebrews. Used as a source for Bibliographia Geographica Palestinæ (1867) by Swiss orientalist Titus Tobler (1806–1877).

William Robson. William Robson (1785–1863), a British author and translator.

- The Great Sieges of History (1855). A study of sieges, including Crusader sieges of Acre, Antioch, Edess and Jerusalem. Illustrated by John Gilbert (1817–1897).
- History of France, from the invasion of the Franks under Clovis, to the accession of Louis Philippe (1856). Translated from the French work by Émile de Bonnechose (1801–1875). (cf. French Wikipedia, Émile de Bonnechose)
- The History of the Crusades, 3 volumes (1852). A translation of Histoire des Croisades by Joseph François Michaud.
- Three Musketeers, 2 volumes (1853). Translation of the classic work of Alexander Dumas. With a letter from Alexander Dumas fils. With 150 illustrations by Maurice Leloir (1853–1940).
- History of the Crusades, 2 volumes (1875). An edition of Michaud's Histoire des Croisades, translated by Robson, and illustrated by Gustave Doré (1832–1863) with 100 grand compositions.

Henry Hart Milman. Henry Hart Milman (1791–1868), an English historian and ecclesiastic.

- History of Latin Christianity, 9 volumes (1855).
- Edward Gibbon's History of the Decline and Fall of the Roman Empire, 6 volumes (1871). A new edition, edited and with notes by Milman.

William Bernard McCabe. William Bernard McCabe (1801–1891), an Irish author of historical romances.

- Florine, Princess of Burgundy: A Tale of the First Crusaders (1855). A historical novel of French Crusader Florine of Burgundy (1083–1097), the wife of Sweyn the Crusader.

Thomas Wright. Thomas Wright (1810–1877), an English antiquarian and writer. Additional works listed in Chapter 6 above.

- Early Christianity in Arabia: a historical essay (1855).
- The History of France: from the earliest period to the present time, 3 volumes (1856–1862). Volume 1 discusses the Crusades.

Celestia Angenette Bloss. Celestia Angenette Bloss (1812–1855), an American teacher and historian.

- Heroines of the Crusades (1857). A stylized history of women important to the Crusades including Adela of Blois, Eleanor of Aquitaine, Berengaria of Navarre, Isabella of Angoulême, Isabella II (Violante) of Jerusalem, and Eleanor of Castile.

John George Edgar. John George Edgar (1834–1864), an English writer of miscellany.

- The Crusades and the Crusaders (1860). A student-level romanticized version of the Crusades through the loss of Acre in 1291.

Arthur Penrhyn Stanley. Arthur Penrhyn Stanley (1815–1881), an English Anglican priest and ecclesiastical historian. Stanley was a co-founder of the Palestine Exploration Fund.

- Sinai and Palestine: in connection with their history (1863).
- The Recovery of Jerusalem: A narrative of exploration and discovery in the city and the Holy Land (1871). With Richard Phené Spiers, Melchior Vogüé, Charles W. Wilson, Charles Warren and others.

William Stubbs. William Stubbs (1825–1901), an English historian and Anglican bishop.

- Chronicles and memorials of the reign of Richard I, 2 volumes (1864–1865). Edited by Stubbs.
- The Medieval Kingdoms of Cyprus and Armenia (1878). Two lectures delivered Oct. 26 and 29, 1878. Talbot collection of British pamphlets .

Charlotte Mary Yonge. Charlotte Mary Yonge (1823–1901), an English novelist.

- The Prince and the Page: A Story of the Last Crusade (1866). A fictional account of Lord Edward's Crusade of 1271–1272 and two assassination attempts on Edward's life (the second of which is foiled by his page).

Barbara Hutton. Barbara Hutton (fl. 1863–1892), an English author of juvenile works and biographies.

- Heroes of the Crusades (1869). A stylized history of heroes of the First through Third Crusades, from Peter the Hermit to Richard the Lionheart.

William Makepeace Thackeray. William Makepeace Thackeray (1811–1863), an English novelist.

- Burlesques (1869). In the story Barbazure, a character relates his time in the Crusades, improbably claiming to have been with Richard I of England at Ascalon, Louis IX of France at Damietta, and Suleiman at Rhodes.

Edward H. Palmer. Edward H. Palmer (1840–1882), an English orientalist and explorer. Member of the Palestine Exploration Fund.

- The Desert of the Exodus, 2 volumes (1871). An account of journeys to the Sinai and Palestine.
- Poems of Beha-ed-Din (1876–1877). Poetry of Egyptian poet Behá-ed-Dín Zoheir (died 1258), in Arabic and English. Behá-ed-Dín Zoheir is mentioned in the biographical dictionary Wafayat al-ayan wa-anba al-zaman of Ibn Khallikan (1211–1282) and in Arabian Nights, but is otherwise unknown.
- Arabic Grammar (1874). The Arabic manual, comprising a condensed grammar of classical and modern Arabic, reading lessons and exercises, with analyses, and a vocabulary of useful words
- Jerusalem, the city of Herod and Saladin (1871), with English novelist and historian Walter Besant (1836–1901). A history of Jerusalem from 33 BCE through the time Saladin, including the first kings of Jerusalem (1099–1191)
- A Concise Dictionary of the Persian Language (1884).
- A translation of the Qur'an (1880). Volume 9 of the Sacred Books of the East series.

Charles Warren. Sir Charles Warren (1840–1927), an officer in the British Royal Engineers. An early European archaeologist in the Holy Land, and particularly the Temple Mount. He was head of the London Metropolitan Police during the Jack the Ripper murders.

- The Recovery of Jerusalem: A narrative of exploration and discovery in the city and the Holy Land (1871). With Richard Phené Spiers, Melchior Vogüé, Charles W. Wilson, Arthur P. Stanley and others.
- The Temple or the Tomb (1880). Giving further evidence in favour of the authenticity of the present site of the Holy Sepulchre, and pointing out some of the principal misconceptions contained in Notes on the Site of the Holy Sepulchre at Jerusalem (1860) and The Temples of the Jews and the other Buildings in the Haram Area at Jerusalem (1878), by Scottish architectural historian James Fergusson (1808–1886).

George Zabriskie Gray. George Zabriskie Gray (1837–1889), an American clergyman and author.

- The Children's Crusade: an episode of the thirteenth century (1872).

Frederick Charles Woodhouse. Frederick Charles Woodhouse (1827–1905), an English historian.

- The Military Religious Orders of the Middle Ages (1879). The Hospitallers, the Templars, the Teutonic Knights, and others. With an appendix of other orders of knighthood: legendary, honorary, and modern.

Edwin Pears. Sir Edwin Pears (1835–1919), a British barrister, author and historian.

- The Fall of Constantinople: Being the Story of the Fourth Crusade (1885).
- The Destruction of the Greek Empire and the Story of the Capture of Constantinople by the Turks (1903).

Jacob Isadore Mombert. Jacob Isadore Mombert (1829–1913), an American historian.

- Great Lives: A Course of History in Biographies (1886). Biographies from ancient to modern times, including one of Godfrey of Bouillon.
- A History of Charles the Great (Charlemagne) (1888).
- A Short History of the Crusades (1894). A history of the Crusades from the First to the Eighth, continuing to 1312. Includes a detailed section on pilgrimage, particularly Helena's discovery of the True Cross. In addition, it discusses the Albigensian Crusade of 1209–1229.

Alfred Hayes. Alfred Hayes (1857–1936), an English poet and translator.

- The Last Crusade, and other Poems (1887). A work concerning the Eighth Crusade of 1270.

Charles Montagu Doughty. Charles Montagu Doughty (1843–1926), an English poet and explorer.

- Travels in Arabia Deserta, 2 volumes (1888). An account of Doughty's travels to the Middle East in the 1870s. Introduction by T. E. Lawrence (1888–1935). Reviewed by explorer Richard F. Burton (1821–1890) in 1898.

Henry Charles Lea. Henry Charles Lea (1825–1909), an American historian, specializing on church history of the Middle Ages.

- A History of the Inquisition of the Middle Ages, 3 volumes (1888). Volume 3, Chapter III discusses the Crusades.
- A History of Auricular Confession and Indulgences in the Latin Church, 3 volumes (1896).

Thomas Andrew Archer. Thomas Andrew Archer (1853–1905), an English historian of the Crusades.

- The Crusade of Richard I, 1189–1192 (1889). A history of the Third Crusade from 1189–1192, in particular, the role of Richard I of England, with English historian Charles L. Kingsford (1862–1926). A detailed chronology with excerpts from Itinerarium Regis Ricardi and works by Ambroise of Normandy (fl. 1190), Roger of Howden (fl. 1174–1201), Ralph of Coggeshall (died after 1227), Ralph de Diceto (1120–1202), Roger of Wendover (died 1236), Matthew Paris (1200–1259), ibn al-Athir (1160–1233) and Bar Hebraeus (1226–1286). With interesting appendices on such diverse subjects as coinage, medieval warfare, the Assassins and the Old Man in the Mountain, beards, Arabic speaking among Crusaders, beheading of the dead. Illustrations of various war engines of the time.
- The Crusades: The Story of the Latin Kingdom of Jerusalem (1894). A history of the Crusades and the kingdom of Jerusalem from the fourth century through the First Crusade, ending with the fall of Acre in 1291. Additional material on the post-Crusade era and commentary are provided. With English historian Charles L. Kingsford (1862–1926) and British author Henry E. Watts (1826–1904).

Charles Lethbridge Kingsford. Charles Lethbridge Kingsford (1862–1926), an English historian and author.

- The Crusade of Richard I, 1189–1192 (1889). A history of the Third Crusade, in particular, the role of Richard I of England, with English historian Thomas A. Archer (1853–1905).
- The Crusades: The Story of the Latin Kingdom of Jerusalem (1894). With English historian Thomas A. Archer (1853–1905) and British author Henry E. Watts (1826–1904).

Claude Reignier Conder. Claude Reignier Conder (1848–1910), an English soldier, explorer and antiquarian. Member of the Palestine Exploration Fund.

- Mediæval Topography of Palestine (1875). In Palestine Exploration Quarterly (1875–1876).
- The Survey of Western Palestine (1881). With British officer Herbert Kitchener (1850–1916). Arabic and English name lists collected during the survey.
- The Survey of Eastern Palestine (1889). Memoirs of the topography, orography, hydrography and archaeology.
- The Latin Kingdom of Jerusalem (1897). A history of the kingdom from Peter the Hermit through the fall of Acre in 1291. With a list of authorities.
- The Life of Saladin (1897). Translation of biography of Saladin by Baha ad-Din ibn Shaddad (1145–1234), published as part of the library of the Palestine Pilgrims' Text Society.

Claude Delaval Cobham. Claude Delaval Cobham (1842–1915), a British colonial official and historian.

- An Attempt at a Bibliography of Cyprus (1886). Original edition had 157 entries. Third edition (1894) shows 497 with new sections of cartography and consular reports.
- The Sieges of Nicosia and Famagusta in Cyprus (1903). Translation of an Italian work on the Ottoman-Venetian war of 1500–1503, originally by historian Uberto Foglietta (1518–1581).
- Travels in the Island of Cyprus (1909). English translation of the Italian work by Giovanni Filippo Mariti (1736–1806).
- The Patriarchs of Constantinople (1911). Chronology of the patriarchs of Constantinople from A.D. 35 through 1884. With H. T. F. Duckworth (1868–1927) and Adrian Fortescue (1874–1923).

Guy Le Strange. Guy Le Strange (1854–1933), a British orientalist specializing in historical geography of the Middle East and editing of Persian geographical texts.

- Palestine under the Moslems: A description of Syria and the Holy Land from A. D. 650 to 1500 (1890).
- Baghdad during the Abbasid caliphate from contemporary Arabic and Persian sources (1900).
- The Lands of the Eastern Caliphate: Mesopotamia, Persia, and Central Asia from the Moslem conquest to the time of Timur (1905).

George William Cox. George William Cox (1827–1902), a British theologian and historian.

- The Crusades (1891). Part of the Epochs of Modern History series. A history of the Holy Land from the capture of Jerusalem by Khosrow II in 611 through the First through Ninth Crusades, arranged chronologically. Includes a section on chivalry.

Stanley Lane-Poole. Stanley Edward Lane-Poole (1854–1931), a British orientalist and archaeologist.

- The Barbary Corsairs (1890). Includes an account of the Spanish Crusade to Mahdia of 1550.
- The Mohammedan Dynasties: Chronological and Genealogical Tables with Historical Introductions (1894). Includes the dynasties of Egypt, the Levant, Persia, Afghanistan and the Mongols.
- Saladin and the Fall of the Kingdom of Jerusalem (1898).
- History of Egypt in the Middle Ages (1901).
- Personal Narrative of a Pilgrimage to Al Madinah and Meccah, 3 volumes (1913). Introduction to the work by British explorer Richard Francis Burton (1821–1890), edited by Lady Isabel Burton (1831–1896).

Henry Edward Watts. Henry Edward Watts (1826–1904), a British journalist and author on Spanish topics.

- The Story of the Christian Recovery of Spain (1895). A history from the Moorish conquest until the fall of Granada, 711–1492. The second part of a new edition of Archer and Kingsford's The story of the Latin kingdom of Jerusalem.
- The Ingenious Gentleman Don Quixote of La Mancha (1895). A new translation of Don Quixote by Miguel de Cervantes (1547–1616), with notes, original and selected.

J. Dunbar Hylton. J. Dunbar Hylton (1837–1893), an American author.

- The Sea-King. A tale of the Crusade under Richard the First of England, in seven parts (1895). An imaginative approach to the Third Crusade featuring sea nymphs and other marine exotic

Hilaire Belloc. Hilaire Belloc (1870–1953), a British-French writer and historian.

- Syllabus of a course of six lectures of the Crusades (1896).
- The Crusades: the World's Debate (1937).

James M. Ludlow. James Meeker Ludlow (1841–1932), an English historian and novelist.

- The Age of the Crusades (1896). An account of the First Crusade through the fall of Acre in 1291, plus material on chivalry and the feudal system. Includes an extensive bibliography. Volume VI of Ten Epochs of Church History (1896), edited by John Fulton.

John Fulton. John Fulton (1834–1907), an English traveler, archivist and historian.

- Ten Epochs of Church History, 10 volumes (1896–1900). Volumes include: I. The Apostolic Age: Its Life, Doctrine, Worship and Polity; II. The Post-Apostolic Age; III. The Ecumenical Councils; IV. The Age of Charlemagne; V. The Age of Hildebrand; VI. The Age of the Crusades; VII. The Age of Renascence (1377–1527); VIII. The Age of the Great Western Schism; IX. The Reformation; and X. The Anglican Reformation.
- Palestine: the Holy Land as it was and as it is (1900).

Marvin R. Vincent. Marvin R. Vincent (1834–1922), an American theologian and author.

- The Age of Hildebrand (1896). The church and papacy from Leo IX (1049–1054) through Innocent III (1198–1216). Accounts of the First through Fourth Crusades, Albigensian Crusade. Volume V of Ten Epochs of Church History (1896), edited by John Fulton.

Richard Davey. Richard Davey (1848–1911), an English author and journalist.

- The Sultan and His Subjects, 2 volumes (1897). A fictional account of the sultans of the Ottoman empire, with an extensive bibliography as sources and an explicit criticism of Islam.

William Foster. Sir William Foster (1863–1951), a British historiographer and member of the Hakluyt Society.

- Embassy of Sir Thomas Roe to the Court of the Great Mogul, 1615–1619, as narrated in his journal and correspondence (1898). By English historian and diplomat Thomas Roe, (c. 1581–1644). Edited with an introduction by W. Foster for the Hakluyt Society.
- Travels in Persia, 1627–1629 (1928). By English historian and explorer Thomas Herbert (1606–1682). Abridged and edited by W. Foster.

Israel Smith Clare. Israel Smith Clare (1847–1924), an American historian.

- Library of Universal History, 12 volumes (1898). A universal world history from ancient Egypt to the Spanish-American War of 1898. Volume 5 considers the rise of Islam and the Fatimid, Seljuk and Ghaznavid dynasties; chivalry; the First Crusade; the Second and Third Crusade; the last four Crusades; the military orders; and the Albigensian Crusade. Volume 6 considers the fall of Constantinople and subsequent Latin Empire; the Mongol conquests; and the rise of the Ottoman empire.

== German historians and other authors ==
August von Kotzebue. August Friedrich Ferdinand von Kotzebue (1761–1819), a German dramatist and writer.

- Die Kreuzfahrer (1803). A play about the First Crusade. Published in London as Alfred and Emma (1806).

Frederich Wilken. Frederich Wilken (1777–1840), a German orientalist. Referred to as the first professional historian to capture the Crusades in book form, pioneering the use of Eastern sources. (cf. German Wikipedia, Frederich Wilken)

- Geschichte der Kreuzzüge nach morgenländischen und abendländischehn Berichten, 7 volumes (1807–1832). A complete history of the Crusades, based on Western, Arabic, Greek and Armenian sources.
- History of the Crusades, English translation of Geschichte der Kreuzzüge.

Arnold Hermann Ludwig Heeren. Arnold Hermann Ludwig Heeren (1760–1842) a German historian.

- Essai sur l'influence des croisades (1808). An essay to examine the influence of the Crusades on the civil liberty of the peoples of Europe, on their civilization, on the progress of trade and industry. Translated by French philosopher Charles F. de Villers (1765–1815).

Joseph von Hammer-Purgstall. Joseph von Hammer-Purgstall (1774–1856), an Austrian orientalist and historian.

- Der Diwan des Mohammed Schemsed-Din Hafis (1812–1813). First complete translation of the Divān of Persian poet Ḥāfeẓ (1315–1390) into a Western language.
- Die Geschichte der Assassinen aus morgenländischen Quellen (1818). A history of the Assassins from oriental sources. French translation: Histoire de l'ordre des assassins à l'origine de l'État islamique.
- Geschichte des osmanischen Reiches, 10 volumes (1827–1835). A history of the Ottoman empire.
- New Arabian Nights Entertainment, 3 volumes (1827), translated by British politician and writer George Lamb (1784–1834).
- Narrative of travels in Europe, Asia, and Africa in the seventeenth century (1834). English language translation of the first two volumes of Evliya Çelebi's travelogue Seyahatname, 10 volumes (1611–1682). Printed for the Oriental translation fund of Great Britain and Ireland.
- The History of the Assassins (1835). An English language translation of Die Geschichte der Assassinen aus morgenländischen Quellen by Oswood C. Wood.
- Geschichte der Goldenen Horde in Kiptschak (1840). A history of the Golden Horde in Russia (Kipchak) around 1200–1500: with detailed references, a descriptive overview of the four hundred sources, nine enclosures containing documents and extracts, and a name and subject index.

Friedrich Heinrich Karl de la Motte. Friedrich Heinrich Karl de la Motte, Baron Fouqué (1777–1843), a German writer of the Romantic style.

- Der Zauberring, 3 volumes (1813). The Magic Ring, set during the Third Crusade.

Allgemeine Encyclopädie der Wissenschaften und Künste. The Allgemeine Encyclopädie der Wissenschaften und Künste, 167 volumes (1813–1889). The Universal Encyclopaedia of Sciences and Arts, originally compiled by German bibliographers Samuel Ersch (1766–1828) and Johann Gottfried Gruber (1774–1851). Known as the Ersch-Gruber Encyclopädie.

Georg Heinrich Pertz. Georg Heinrich Pertz (1795–1876), a German historian.

- Monumenta Germaniae Historica (MGH) (1826). Edited first by Pertz and then by German historians Georg Waitz (1813–1886), Theodor Mommsen (1817–1903) and others. Comprehensive set of chronicle and archival sources for German history from the end of the Roman Empire until 1500.

Josef Dobrovský. Josef Dobrovský (1753–1829), a Czech philologist and historian.

- Historia de expeditione Friderici Imperatoris (1827). An edition of Historia de expeditione Friderici imperatoris (History of the Expedition of the Emperor Frederick), or Espeditio Friderici Imperatoris, providing a history of the Third Crusade from 1189–1192 with an emphasis on the expedition of Frederick I Barbarossa.

Barthold Georg Niebuhr. Barthold Georg Niebuhr (1776–1831), a Danish–German statesman and historian who was a founder of modern historiography.

- Corpus Scriptorum Historæ Byzantinæ (CSHB), 50 volumes (1828–1897). Also known as the Bonn Corpus. Originally edited by Jesuit historian and geographer Philippe Labbe (1607–1667) in 1648, updated by Niebuhr. Primary sources from 330–1453 for the history of the Byzantine empire.

Leopold von Ranke. Leopold von Ranke (1795–1886), a German historian and a founder of modern source-based history.

- Das Zeitalter der Kreuzzüge und das späte Mittelalter. The Age of the Crusades and the Middle Ages.
- Heinrich IV, König von Frankreich. A biography of Henry IV, Holy Roman Emperor.
- The History of the Popes during the Last Four Centuries (1834). A history of the popes from the sixteenth century through the late nineteenth century, with an overview of the papacy prior to 1500, and detailed biographies from Leo X (1513–1521) to Sixtus V (1585–1590).
- Weltgeschichte, 9 volumes (1881–1888). World history, particularly Volume 8: The Crusades and Papal World Domination. Covers the First through Fourth Crusades, the Mongol conquests and the Teutonic Order in Prussia.

Heinrich Ferdinand Wüstenfeld. Heinrich Ferdinand Wüstenfeld (1808–1899), a German orientalist, known as a literary historian of Arabic literature.

- Vitae illustrium virorum (1837). Translation into Latin of the sources of Wafayat al-ayan wa-anba al-zaman (Deaths of Eminent Men and the Sons of the Epoch) used by Arab scholar ibn Khallikan (1211–1282).
- Abhandlung über die in Aegypten eingewanderten arabischen stämme (1847). Translation of Al-Mawāʻiẓ wa-al-Iʻtibār bi-Dhikr al-Khiṭaṭ wa-al-āthār by Egyptian historian al-Makrizi (1364–1442).
- Kitābʻ ʻAjāʾib al-makhlūqāt wa-gharāʾib al-mawjūdāt (1848–1849). Edition of ʿAjā'ib al-makhlūqāt wa gharā'ib al-mawjūdāt (Marvels of creatures and Strange things existing), an Arabic work on cosmography by Persian polymath Zakariya al-Qazwini (1203–1283).

Karl Georg von Raumer. Karl Georg von Raumer (1783–1865), a German geologist.

- Palästina (1838). A description of the geography and geology of Palestine.
- Kreuzzüge, 2 volumes (1840–1864). A history of the Crusades.

Friedrich Emmanuel von Hurter. Friedrich Emmanuel von Hurter (1787–1865), a Swiss historian.

- Histoire du pape Innocent III et de ses contemporains, 2 volumes (1839).

Heinrich von Sybel. Heinrich von Sybel (1817–1895), a German historian who studied under German historian Leopold von Ranke (1795–1886). Sybel and Ranke challenged the work of William of Tyre as being secondary.

- Ueber das königreich Jerusalem, 1100–1131 (1840). A history of the kingdom of Jerusalem under Baldwin I of Jerusalem and Baldwin II of Jerusalem.
- Geschichte des ersten Kreuzzuges (1841, updated 1881). A history of the First Crusade and contains a full study of the authorities for the First Crusade.
- History and Literature of the Crusades, 1 volume (1861). A history and bibliography of the Crusades through the Third Crusade, translated by English author Lucie, Lady Duff-Gordon (1821–1969).

Joseph Ignatius Ritter. Joseph Ignatius Ritter (1787–1857), a German historian.

- Ueber die Verehrung der Reliquien und besonders des heil (1845). About the veneration of relics and especially of the holy.

Joseph Derenbourg. Joseph Derenbourg (1811–1895) was a Franco-German orientalist.

- Les séances de Hariri, publiées en arabe avec un commentaire choisi by Ḥarīrī, 2nd edition (1847). Translation of the work of Arab poet al-Harīrī (1030–1122). Original translation by French orientalist Antoine Isaac Silvestre de Sacy (1758–1838). Second edition edited with French orientalist Joseph Toussaint Reinaud (1795–1867).
- Essai sur l'histoire et la géographie de la Palestine (1867). An original contribution to the history of the Jews and Judaism in the time of Christ.
- Oeuvres complètes de r. Saadia ben Iosef al-Fayyoûmî, 9 volumes (1893). The complete works of Gaon and Jewish philosopher Saadia ben Joseph Al-Fayyumi (892–942). With his son, French orientalist Hartwig Derenbourg (1844–1908)

Heinrich Joseph Wetzer. Heinrich Joseph Wetzer (1801–1853), a German orientalist.

- Wetzer-Welte Kirchenlexikon, 12 volumes (1847–1860). Oder Encyklopädie der katholischen Theologie und ihrer Hülfswissenchaften.

Heinrich Graetz. Heinrich Graetz (1817–1891), a German historian who wrote one of the first comprehensive history of the Jewish people from a Jewish perspective.

- History of the Jews, 6 volumes (1853–1875). The Crusades are covered in Volume 3.

Gottlieb Lukas Friedrich Tafel. Gottlieb Lukas Friedrich Tafel (1757–1860), a German classical philologist and a pioneer of Byzantine studies in Europe. (cf. German Wikipedia, Gottlieb Lukas Friedrich Tafel)

- Urkunden zur älteren Handels- und Staatsgeschichte der Republik Venedig, mit besonderer Beziehung auf Byzanz und die Levante, 3 volumes (1856–1857). Documents on the earlier commercial and state history of the Republic of Venice, with special reference to Byzantium and the Levant. From the 9th to the end of the 15th century. With German historian Georg Martin Thomas (1817–1887).

Georg Martin Thomas. Georg Martin Thomas (1817–1887), a German philologist and historian. (cf. German Wikipedia, Georg Martin Thomas)

- Urkunden zur älteren Handels- und Staatsgeschichte der Republik Venedig, mit besonderer Beziehung auf Byzanz und die Levante, 3 volumes (1856–1857). Documents on the earlier commercial and state history of the Republic of Venice, with special reference to Byzantium and the Levant. From the 9th to the end of the 15th century. With German historian Gottlieb Lukas Friedrich Tafel (1757–1860).
- Diplomatarium veneto-levantinum sive Acta et diplomata res Venetas, Graecas atque Levantis illustrantia, 1300–1454, 2 volumes (1880–1899). With Italian archivist Riccardo Predelli (1840–1909).

Wilhelm Wattenbach. Wilhelm Wattenbach (1819–1897), a German historian.

- Deutschlands Geschichtsquellen im mittelalter bis zur mitte des dreizehnten jahrhunderts, 2 volumes (1858). Germany's historical sources from the Middle Ages to the middle of the thirteenth century. Later edition of Volume 1 edited by German paleographer Ludwig Traube (1861–1907) and German historian Ernst Dümmler (1830–1902).

August Potthast. August Potthast (1824–1898), a German historian.

- Bibliotheca Historica Medii Aevi, 2 volumes (1862). Guide through the historical works of the European Middle Ages up to 1500. Complete table of contents for 'Acta sanctorum' Boll – Bouquet – Migne – Monum. Germ. hist .-- Muratori – Rerum Britann. scriptores etc.; Appendix: Source studies for the history of European states during the Middle Ages.
- Regesta Pontificum Romanorum inde ab a. post Christum natum MCXCVIII ad a. MCCCIV, 2 volumes (1874–1875). Works of the popes from 1198–1304, edited by Potthast.

Franz Miklosich. Franz Miklosich (1813–1891), a Slovene philologist.

- Acta et diplomata graeca medii aevi sacra et profana, 6 volumes (1862–1890). With German philologist Joseph Müller (1825–1895).
- Monumenta spectantia ad unionem ecclesiarum Graecae et Romanae (1872). With German historian Augustin Theiner (1804–1874).

Joseph Müller. Joseph Müller (1825–1895), a German philologist. (cf. German Wikipedian, Joseph Müller)

- Acta et diplomata graeca medii aevi sacra et profana, 6 volumes (1862–1890). With Slovene philologist Franz Miklosich (1813–1891).

Bernhard von Kugler. Bernhard von Kugler (1837–1898), a German historian.

- Boemund und Tankred, Fürsten von Antiochien: ein Beitrag zur Geschichte der Normannen in Syrien (1862).
- Studien zur Geschichte des Zweiten Kreuzzuges (1866). Studies on the history of the Second Crusade.
- Geschichte der Kreuzzüge (1880). A history of the Crusades. Reprinted in Allgemeine Geschichte in Einzeldarstellungen.
- Albert von Aachen (1885). A commentary on German historian of the Crusades Albert of Aachen (fl. 1100) and his major work Historia Hierosolymitanae expeditionis (History of the Expedition to Jerusalem).

Karl Hopf. Karl Hopf (1832–1873), a German historian, specializing in medieval Greece, both Byzantine and Frankish.

- Geschichte Griechenlands vom Beginn des Mittelalters bis auf unsere Zeit, 2 volumes (1876). History of Greece from the beginning of the Middle Ages to our time. Originally printed in the Ersch-Gruber Encyclopädie, Volumes 85–86.

Carl Hermann Ethé. Carl Hermann Ethé (1844–1917), a German orientalist who specialized in catalogues of Islamic manuscripts and German translations of Persian poetry.

- Kazwînis Kosmographie: Die Wunder der Schöpfung (1868). German translation of ʿAjā'ib al-makhlūqāt wa gharā'ib al-mawjūdāt (Marvels of creatures and Strange things existing), an Arabic work on cosmography by Persian polymath Zakariya al-Qazwini (1203–1283). Based on the 1848 edition by German orientalist Heinrich Ferdinand Wüstenfeld (1808–1899).
- Catalogue of Persian Manuscripts in the Library of the India Office, 42 volumes (1903).
- Articles for the Encyclopædia Britannica, 11th Edition (1911).

Tabulae Ordinis Teutonici. Tabulae Ordinis Teutonici (1869) is a collection of original documents related to the Teutonic Order. Edited by German archivist Ernst Strehlke (1834–1869), completed posthumously by German historian Philipp Jaffé. (cf. German Wikipedia, Ernst Strehlke)

Karl Fischer. Karl Fischer (1840–1933), a German historian and social scientist.

- Geschichte des Kreuzzüges Kaiser Friedrich's I (1870).

Augustin Theiner. Augustin Theiner (1804–1874), a German theologian and historian. Prefect of the Vatican secret archives.

- Monumenta spectantia ad unionem ecclesiarum Graecae et Romanae (1872). With Slovene philologist Franz Miklosich (1813–1891).

Reinhold Röhricht. Reinhold Röhricht (1842–1905), a German historian of the Crusades, regarded as a pioneer with fellow German historian Heinrich Hagenmeyer (1834–1915) in the history of the kingdom of Jerusalem, laying the foundation for modern Crusader research.

- Die Kreuzfahrt Kaiser Friedrich des Zweiten (1228–1229) (1872)
- Beiträge zur Geschichte der Kreuzzüg, 2 volumes (1874–1888). Contributions to the history of the Crusades. Includes three parts: (1) Die Kreuzfahrt des Kaisers Friedrich II (Crusade of Frederick II, 1228–1229); Die Kämpfe Saladins mit den Christen in den Jahren 1187 und 1188 (Saladin's battles with the Christians in 1187 and 1188); and Auszüge aus dem Werke Kamål ad-Dins: Die Sahne der Geschichte Halebs (Excerpts from Kamal al-Din's history of Aleppo, Bughyat al-ṭalab fī tārīkh Ḥalab).
- Der Kinderkreuzzug von 1212 (1876), in Historische Zeitschrift, Bd. 36, H.1, 1876. An account of the Children's Crusade of 1212.
- Quinti Belli sacri scriptores minores (1879). Six minor works edited by Röhricht, primarily concerning the Fifth Crusade. Continued by the author's Testimonia minora de quinto bello sacro. Also referred to as Scriptores Minores Quinti Belli sacri.
- Die Jerusalemfahrten der Grafen Philipp, Ludwig (1484) und Reinhard von Hanau (1550). Accounts of fifteenth- and sixteenth- century pilgrimages to Jerusalem by the house of Hanau-Münzenberg.
- Die eroberung Akkâs durch die Muslimen (1291). An account of the fall of Acre in 1291.
- Études sur les derniers temps du royaume de Jérusalem (1881, 1884). Studies on the latter days of the kingdom of Jerusalem. La croisade du prince Édouard d'Angleterre (1270–1274) and Les batailles de Hims (1281 du 1289) in Archives de l'Orient Latin (AOL), Tome 1. Les combats du sultan Bibars contre les Chêtiens en Syrie (1261–1277) in AOL Tome 2.
- Testimonia minora de quinto bello sacro (1882). A continuation of Quinti Belli sacri scriptores minores, providing some 233 lesser-known excerpts of contemporaneous authors concerning the Fifth Crusade. Volume 2 of Société de l'Orient Latin, Série historique.
- An edition of the Annales de Terre Sainte, 1095–1291 (1884). With French historian and philologist Gaston Raynaud (1850–1911). The Annales de Terre Sainte was first composed in Old French and refers to a series of brief chronological entries that recount the history of the Crusades and the Latin East from 1095–1291. The Annales tradition proved popular enough that it was copied into a number of compilation manuscripts, such as the Chronique de Terre Sainte of Gestes des Chiprois.
- Bibliotheca geographica Palaestinae (1890). Summaries of over 3500 books on the geography of the Holy Land issued between 355 and 1878.
- Studien zur Geschichte des fünften Kreuzzuges (1891). Study on the history of the Fifth Crusade.
- Regesta Regni Hierosolymitani, MXCVII-MCCXCI (1893), with Additamentum (1904). The biographies of the kings of Jerusalem from 1097–1291.
- Karten und Pläne zur Palästinakunde aus dem 7 bis 16 Jahrhundert (1895). A catalog of the eight known Crusader maps of Jerusalem. In Zeitschrift des deutschen Palästina-Vereins Bd.18 (1895), pp. 173–182.
- Syria sacra (1897).
- Geschichte der Kreuzzüge im Umriss (1898). An outline of the history of the Crusades. Covers the Holy Land pre-1095; pope Urban II and the First Crusade; the kings of Jerusalem through Guy of Lusignan; the Second through Eighth Crusades; minor Crusades and the Children's Crusade; the fall of Acre.
- Geschichte der Königreichs Jerusalem (1100–1291) (1898). A history of the kingdom of Jerusalem from 1100–1291.
- Marino Sanudo sen. als Kartograph Palästinas (1898). In Zeitschrift des deutschen Palästina-Vereins Bd. 21 (1898), pp. 84–126.
- Deutsche Pilgerreisen nach dem heiligen Lande (1900). German pilgrimages to the Holy Land.
- Geschichte des ersten Kreuzzuges (1901). A history of the First Crusade.

Eduard Winkelmann. Eduard Winkelmann (1838–1896), a German historian.

- Philipp von Schwaben und Otto IV, 2 volumes (1873–1878).

Hans Prutz. Hans Prutz (1843–1929), a German historian.

- Quellenbeiträge zur Geschichte der Kreuzzüge (1874). Source contributions to the Crusades, including works by English chronicler Ralph of Coggeshall (died after 1227) and French or Norman Crusader Walter the Chancellor (died after 1122).
- Geheimlehre und Geheimstatuten des Tempelherrenordens (1879). Translated to The Secret Teaching of the Knights Templar.
- Entwickelung und Untergang des Tempelherrenordens (1888). A history of the rise and fall of the Templars.
- Kulturgeschichte der Kreuzzüge (1883). A cultural history of the Crusades.
- Geschichte des Mittelalters (1889–1892). Edited by Prutz with German historian Julius von Pflugk-Harttung (1848–1919).
- The Economic Development of Western Europe under the influence of the Crusades (1903). In Essays on the Crusades, edited by American historian Dana C. Munro (1866–1933).
- Die Anfänge der Hospitaliter auf Rhodos, 1310–1355 (1908). The beginnings of the Knights Hospitallers in Rhodes from 1310–1355.

Hermann Hagen. Hermann Hagen (1844–1898), a German-Swiss classical philologist. (cf. German Wikipedia, Hermann Hagen)

- Jacobus Bongarsius (1874). A biography of Jacques Bongars (1554–1612)
- Catalogus codicum bernensium (Bibliotheca Bongarsiana) (1875). Edited by German philosopher Hermann Hagen (1844–1898).

Wilhelm Oncken. Christian Friedrich Georg Wilhelm Oncken (1838–1905), a German historian. (cf. German Wikipedia, Wilhelm Oncken)

- Allgemeine Geschichte in Einzeldarstellungen, 45 volumes (1876–1891). (cf., German Wilkipedia, Allgemeine Geschichte in Einzeldarstellungen)

Heinrich Hagenmeyer. Heinrich Hagenmeyer (1834–1915), a German Protestant pastor and historian, specializing in writing and editing Crusader texts. Closely associated with fellow German historian Reinhold Röhricht (1842–1905), their contribution to the history of the kingdom of Jerusalem set a sound archival footing. In particular, Hagenmeyer's Peter der Eremite (1879) established an orthodoxy on the Crusade's origins and course not seriously challenged until the 1980s (cf. German Wikipedia, Heinrich Hagenmeyer)

- Ekkehardi Uraugiensis abbatis Hierosolymita (1877). An edition of the Chronicon universale (World Chronicle) of Bavarian abbot and First Crusader Ekkehard of Aura (died 1126).
- Peter der Eremite. Ein kritischer Beitrag zur Geschichte des ersten Kreuzzuges (1879). A critical contribution to the history of the First Crusade and the role of Peter the Hermit.
- Galterii Cancellarii Bella Antiochena. mit Erläuterungen und einem Anhange (1896). An edition of Bella Antiochena (Wars of Antioch) by French or Norman First Crusader Walter the Chancellor (died after 1122).
- Anonymi gesta Francorum et aliorum hierosolymitanorum (1890). An edition of the anonymous account of the First Crusade Gesta Francorum et aliorum Hierosolimitanorum (Deeds of the Franks and the other pilgrims to Jerusalem), written in 1100–1101.
- Epistulae et chartae ad historiam primi belli sacri spectantes, quae supersunt aevo aequales ac genuinae (1901). A collection of letters and charters on the history of the First Crusade, 1088–1100. Also published as Die Kreuzzugsbriefe aus den Jahren 1088–1100.
- Die Kreuzzugsbriefe aus den Jahren 1088–1100 (1901). An alternate edition of Epistulae et chartae ad historiam primi belli sacri spectantes.
- Chronologie de la première croisade 1094–1100 (1902). A day-by-day account of the First Crusade, cross-referenced to original sources, with commentary.
- Chronologie de l'Histoire du Royaume de Jérusalem. Règne de Baudouin I (1101–1118) (1902). In Revue de l'Orient Latin (ROL), Volumes 9–12.
- Fulcheri Carnotensis Historia Hierosolymitana (1059–1127). Mit Erläuterungen und einem Anhange.(1913). An edition of the chronicle Gesta Francorum Iherusalem Perefrinantium (Historia Hierosolymitana) by priest and First Crusader Fulcher of Chartres (c. 1059 – after 1128). With explanations and an appendix.

Charles A. Kohler. Charles A. Kohler (1854–1917), a Swiss archivist and director of the Revue de l'Orient Latin (ROL).

- Itinera hierosolymitana et descriptiones terrae sanctae bellis sacris anteriora (1879). Itineraries of pilgrimages to the Holy Land from the fourth through the eleventh century. Includes Bernard the Pilgrim (fl. 865), Saint Willibald (c. 700-c. 787), the Venerable Bede (c. 720), Arculf (fl. late seventh century), Theodosius' De situ terrae sanctae (530), Eucherius of Lyon (440), and Saint Paula of Rome (347-404) and her daughter Eustochium. Editor, with French historian Auguste Molinier (1851–1904) and Swiss orientalist Titus Tobler (1806–1877).
- Mélanges pour servir à l'Histoire de l'Orient Latin et des Croisades (1906). Selected articles extracted from ROL Tomes IV, V, VI, VII, VIII, IX and X.
- Documents relatifs à Guillaume Adam, archevêque de Sultanieh, puis d'Antivari et son entourage (1906), in Mélanges pour servir à l'Histoire de l'Orient Latin et des Croisades, Volume 2, pp. 475–515. Documents relating to Guillaume Adam (died 1341), archbishop of Soltaniyeh and then of Antivari, and his entourage.

Wilhelm Heyd. Wilhelm Heyd (1823–1906), a German historian. (cf. German Wikipedia, Wilhelm Heyd).

- Geschichte des Levantehandels im mittelalter, 2 volumes (1879).
- Histoire du Commerce du Levant au Moyen-âge, 2 volumes (1885–1886). A French translation of Geschichte des Levantehandels im mittelalter by Marc Furcy-Raynaud (1872–1933.

Theodor Ilgen. Theodor Ilgen (1854–1924), a German archivist and historian.

- Markgraf Conrad von Montferrat (1880). A biography of marquess Conrad of Montferrat (died 1192), de facto king of Jerusalem (as Conrad I) by virtue of his marriage to Isabella I of Jerusalem.

Karl Neumann. Karl Neumann (1860–1934), a German historian.

- Bernard von Clairvaux und die Anfänge des zweiten Kreuzzüges (1882). Bernard of Clairvaux and the beginnings of the Second Crusade.
- Griechische Geschichtschreiber und Geschichtsquellen im zwölften Jahrhundert (1888). Greek historians and sources of history in the 12th century. Studies on Anna Komnene (1083–1153), Theodore Prodromus (c. 1100 – before 1170) and John Kinnamos (1143 – after 1185).
- Die Weltstellung des byzantinischen Reiches vor de Kreuzzügen (1894). A history of the Byzantine empire before the Crusades. Includes accounts of Constantine IX Monomachos, George Maniakes and the Norman conquest of southern Italy.

Karl von Lama. Karl von Lama (1841–1920), a German librarian and bookseller. (cf. German Wikipedia, Karl von Lama)

- Bibliothèque des écrivains de la Congrégation de Saint-Maur (1882). Bibliography of Maurist works from the Congregation of Saint Maur between 1645–1787. Compiled by K. von Lama, reducing and completing the earlier Histoire littéraire de la congregation de Saint-Maur (1770) of René-Prosper Tassin (1697–1777).

August Reifferscheid. Karl Wilhelm August Reifferscheid (1835–1887), a German archaeologist and classical philologist.

- Annae Comnenae, Porphyrogenitae, Alexias, 2 volumes (1884).

August Müller. August Müller (1848–1892), a German orientalist.

- Der Islam im Morgen- und Abendland, 2 volumes (1885–1887). Reprinted in Allgemeine Geschichte in Einzeldarstellungen.
- Orientalische bibliographie, 26 volumes (1887–1892).

Theodor Wolff. Theodor Wolff (1867–1927), a German historian and editor. (cf. German Wikipedia, Theodor Wolff)

- Die Bauernkreuzzüge des Jahres 1096 : ein Beitrag zur Geschichte der ersten Kreuzzüge (1891). An account of the People's Crusade of 1096.

Julius Hermann Gotthelf Gmelin. Julius Hermann Gotthelf Gmelin (1859–1919), a German historian specializing in the Knights Templar.

- Schuld oder Unschuld des Templerordens: Kritischer Versuch zur Lösung der Frage (1893).

Franz Xaver von Funk. Franz Xaver von Funk (1840–1907), a German Catholic theologian and historian.

- Petrus von Amiens (1895). A history of Peter the Hermit. In Wetzer–Welte Kirchenlexikon, Volume IX.

Richard Sternfeld. Richard Sternfeld (1858–1926), a German historian and musicologist. (cf. German Wikipedia, Richard Sternfeld)

- Ludwigs des heiligen kreuzzug nach Tunis 1270 und die politik Karls I von Sizilien (1896). An account of the Eighth Crusade, Louis IX of France and Charles I of Sicily.

Nicolae Iorga (Jorga). Nicolae Iorga (1871–1940), a Romanian historian and politician.

- Philippe de Mézièves et la croisade au XIVe siècle (1896), in Bibliothèque de l'École des hautes études. Sciences historiques et philologiques, Fascicule 110. An account of French knight Philippe de Mézières (c. 1327–1405) and his quest for a new Crusade (see Fourteenth century above).
- Notes et extraits pour servir a l'hist. des croisades au XVe siècle, 6 volumes (1899–1916).
- Latins et Grecs d'Orient et l'établissement des Turcs en Europe (1342–1362), in Byzantinische Zeitschrift, Fünfzehn Band (1906).
- Brève histoire des croisades et de leurs fondations en Terre Sainte (1924).

Walter Carl Norden. Walter Carl Norden (1876–1937), a German historian and community scientist. (cf. German Wikipedia, Walter Norden)

- Der vierte Kreuzzug im Rahmen der Beziehungen des Abendlandes zu Byzanz (1898).
- Das Papsttum und Byzanz: die Trennung der beiden Mächte und das Problem ihrer Wiedervereinigung bis zum Untergange des Byzantinischen Reichs (1453) (1903).

Alexander Cartellier. Alexander Cartellieri (1867–1955), a German historian.

- Philipp II.: August, 4 volumes (1899–1921). A biography of Philip II of France.

Eduard Heyck. Eduard Heyck (1862–1941), a German cultural historian, editor, writer and poet.

- Die Kreuzzüge und das Heilige Land (1900). Covers: pilgrimages and the origins of the Crusades; the First Crusade through the fall of Acre in 1291; law and administration of the Crusader states. Three maps and 163 illustrations.

== Arabic and Turkish historians ==
Original works by Muslim historians include the following.

Namik Kemal. Namik Kemal (1840–1880), a Turkish journalist and political activist. One of the founders of the modern Ottoman literature.

- Selâhaddini Eyyûbî (Biography of Saladin) (1872). First modern Muslim biography of Saladin.
- Celâleddin Harzemşah (1875). Biography of Jalal al-Din Mangburni (1199–1231), last shah of the Khwarazmian Empire.
- Edebiyat i-Cedide (1884). Ottoman New Literature, includes three works: Salah al-Din – on sultan Saladin (1137–1193), Fatih – on sultan Mehmed II (1432–1481), and Sultan Selim (1470–1520).

Sayyid ‘Ali al-Hariri. Sayyid ‘Ali al-Hariri (fl. 1899), an Egyptian historian.

- Splendid Accounts in the Crusading Wars (1899), the first Muslim account of the Crusades using Arab sources.

== Translations of original sources ==
Translations of Arabic, Persian, Coptic and Byzantine works by Western historians include the following.

Joseph White. Joseph White (1745–1814), an English orientalist and theologian.

- Account of Egypt (1800). By Arab historian Abd al-Latif al-Baghdadi (1162–1231). Arabic document first discovered and published by Edward Pococke (1604–1691). His son, Edward Pococke the Younger, then translated a fragment of the work into Latin. Thomas Hunt began the task of completing the translation but did not finish. The Latin translation was then completed by J. White.

Gustav Flügel. Gustav Leberecht Flügel (1802–1870), a German orientalist.

- Bibliographical and Encyclopaedic Lexicon, 7 volumes (1835–1858). A translation of Kaşf az-Zunūn by Kâtip Çelebi (1609–1657). A bibliographic encyclopedia of Arabic works whose title translates to The Removal of Doubt from the Names of Books and the Arts. Published in a French translation by Barthélemy d'Herbelot (1625–1695).

Michael Jan de Goeje. Michael Jan de Goeje (1836–1909), a Dutch orientalist focusing on Arabia and Islam.

- Bibliotheca Geographorum Arabicorum, 8 volumes (1870–1894).
- Selection from the Annals of Tabari (1902). Selected translations from the chronicle History of the Prophets and Kings (Annals of Tabari), written by Persian historian Muhammad ibn Jarir al-Tabari (838–923).
- Selections from Arabic Geographical Literature (1907).

Beniamino Raffaello Sanguinetti. Beniamino Raffaello Sanguinetti (1811–1883), an Italian orientalist.

- Travels of Ibn Battuta, A.D. 1325–1354 (before 1883). Translation of Moroccan explorer ibn Battūta's Voyages (Rihla) by Sanguinetti with Charles Defrémery (1822–1883) and H. A. R. Gibb (1895–1971).

Urbain Bouriant. Urbain Bouriant (1849–1903), a French Egyptologist, who discovered the Gospel of Peter in a tomb at Akhmim.

- Description topographique et historique de l'Égypte, 2 volumes (1895–1900). French translation of the Al-Mawāʻiẓ wa-al-Iʻtibār bi-Dhikr al-Khiṭaṭ wa-al-āthār written by Egyptian historian al-Makrizi (1364–1442).

David Samuel Margoliouth. David Samuel Margoliouth (1858–1940), an English orientalist.

- Umayyads and 'Abbásids, being the fourth part of Jurjí Zaydán's History of Islamic civilization (1907). A translation of Tarikh al-Tamaddun al-Islami, 5 volumes (1901–1906) of Lebanese writer Jurji Zaydan 1861–1914).
- The Eclipse of the Abbasid Caliphate: Original Chronicles of the Fourth Islamic Century, 7 volumes (1920–1921). Edited with British orientalist Henry P. Amedroz (1854–1917). Includes the Book of Viziers of Hilal al-Sabi', Tajárib al-Umam by Miskawayh and the Damascus Chronicles of ibn al-Qalanisi.

Jean-Baptiste Chabot. Jean-Baptiste Chabot (1860–1948), a leading French Syriac scholar.

- Chronique de Michel le Syrien: patriarche jacobite d'Antioche, 1166–1199, 4 volumes (1899–1910). A translation of The Chronicle of Michael the Syrian (1126–1199).
- Répertoire d'Epigraphie Sémitique (RES), 8 volumes (1900). With French archaeologist Charles Simon Clermont-Ganneau (1846–1923). Published by the Commission du Corpus inscriptionum semiticarum.
- Corpus Scriptorum Christianorum Orientalium (CSCO), 600+ volumes (1903 ff.). A collection of Eastern Christian texts in Syriac, Arabic, Coptic, Ethopic, Armenian and Georgian. Editor, with French orientalist Bernard Carra de Vaux (1867–1953), Chaldean priest and orientalist Louis Cheikho (1859–1927), Italian orientalist Ignazio Guidi (1844–1935) and Franco-American Coptologist Henri Hyvernat (1858–1941).

Constantine Sathas. Constantine Sathas (1842–1914), a Greek historian and researcher.

- Biblioteca Graeca Medii Aevi (Medieval Library), 7 volumes (1872–1894). Collection of Greek, Byzantine and post-Byzantine works, including works by Michael Attaliates, Niketas Choniates, Theodoros Metochites, Leontios Machairas, Kaisarios Dapontes, Anastasios Gordios, Michael Psellos, and lists of martyrs, catalogs and mixed writings from Jerusalem, Cyprus and Crete.
- Documents inédits relatifs à l'histoire de la Grèce au Moyen Âge publi es sous les auspices del la Chambre des députés de Grèce, 9 volumes (1880–1890). Mnēmeia Hellēnikēs historias or Monuments of Greek history.

Charles Henri Auguste Schefer. Charles Henri Auguste Schefer (1820–1898), a French historian. (cf. French Wikipedia, Charles-Henri-Auguste Schefer)

- Description des lieux saints de la Galilée et de la Palestine (1881). Translation of work by Aboul Hassan Aly el Herewy.
- Description topographique et historique de Boukhara (1892). A translation of Tarikh-i Bukhara, by Bukharan historian Abu Bakr Muhammad ibn Jafar Narshakhi (c. 899 – 959).
- Catalogue de la collection de manuscrits orientaux, arabes, persans et turcs (1900).
- Translation of accounts of journeys to the Holy Land. See Section 6.

François Nau. François Nau (1864–1931), a French Catholic priest, mathematician, Syriacist, and specialist in oriental languages.

- Patrologia Orientalis (PO), 49 volumes (1907, ongoing). Edited by Nau and French Syriacist René Graffin (1858–1941). A collection of medieval writings through the fifteenth century of eastern Church Fathers in Syriac, Armenian, Arabic, Coptic, Ethopic and Georgian.

== See also ==
- Crusades
- Islamic view on the Crusades
