= Alfred Hayes =

Alfred Hayes may refer to:

- Alfred Hayes (poet) (1857–1936), British poet; author of school song for King Edward's School, Birmingham
- Alfred Hayes Jr. (1873–1936), American lawyer; Rooseveltian Progressivist
- Alfred Hayes (banker) (1910–1989), American banker; president of Federal Reserve Bank of New York
- Alfred Hayes (writer) (1911–1985), British writer for film and television
- Lord Alfred Hayes (1928–2005), English professional wrestler, manager and commentator
- Alfred Hayes (priest) (died 1937), archdeacon of Calgary

== See also ==
- Fred Haise (born 1933), American astronaut
