= Bibliothèque de l'École des Chartes =

Academic journal on medieval manuscripts

The Bibliothèque de l'École des Chartes (French pronunciation: [biblijɔtɛk də lekɔl de ʃaʁt]) is a journal dedicated to the study and use of medieval manuscripts. It was founded in 1839 and continues to provide bi-annual issues with articles and abstracts in French, English, and German. Starting in 1995, one issue each year is devoted to a particular theme. It is published by the Société de l'École des chartes (Association of the Archive Training School) and distributed by Librairie Droz. As of 2016, the director is Michelle Bubenicek.

Scholars often cite this journal with the abbreviation BEC. Historical works on the Crusades, for example, often refer to medieval documents as published in the Bibliothèque.

== See also ==
- Bibliothèque des Écoles françaises d'Athènes et de Rome
- Victorian societies for text publication
