= Richard of Devizes =

English monk and chronicler

Richard of Devizes (fl. late 12th century), English chronicler, was a monk of St Swithin's house at Winchester.

His birthplace is probably indicated by his surname, Devizes in Wiltshire, but not much is known about his life. He is credited by Bale with the composition of the Annales de Wintonia, which are edited by Henry Richards Luard in the second volume of the Annales Monastici. If this statement be correct, then the chronicler survived King Richard I of England.

In his account of the coronation of Richard the Lionheart in 1189 he was the first person to use the word holocaust when he described the mass murder of the Jews of London, although the use of this word simply refers to a " whole (holos) burnt (kaustos)" sacrificial offering to a god.

Now in the year of our Lord's incarnation 1189, Richard, the son of King Henry the Second, by Eleanor, and brother of Henry the Third, was consecrated king of the English by Baldwin, archbishop of Canterbury, at Westminster, in the nones of the third of September. On the very day of the coronation, about that solemn hour in which the Son was immolated to the Father, a sacrifice of the Jews to their father, the Devil, was commenced in the city of London, and so long was the duration of this famous mystery that the holocaust could scarcely be accomplished the ensuing day. The other cities and towns of the kingdom emulated the faith of the Londoners, and with a like devotion dispatched their bloodsuckers with blood to hell.

== Chronicon ==
The Chronicon de rebus gestis Ricardi Primi (1192), by which Richard of Devizes is chiefly known, covers only the first three years of King Richard's reign; it is practically an account of events in England and the Holy Land during the Third Crusade. The narrator of the chronicle is a French Jewish cobbler giving advice to young French Christians intending to visit England.

For the events of the crusade itself, some consider Richard to be poor authority. But his account of the preparations for the crusade, and of English affairs in the king's absence, is valuable, in spite of some possible inaccuracies.

A new reading has emerged recently of the Chronicle mostly due to the inordinate number of classical and biblical references it is laced with (see Anthony P. Bale's article, cited below). Rather than a true historic record, it has been suggested that Devizes' account should be read as an elegant satire and a challenge of contemporary Christian myths against the Jewish community and its mores; particularly those of ritualistic murders of Christian boys by the Jews of Winchester. It is, however, acknowledged that it is by no means a defence of the Jewish community. Others have seen the author as intensely conservative, steeped in the prejudices of his order, and as hostile to the Jews and to the chancellor, William Longchamp.

Devizes writes in a vivid and epigrammatic style; his Latin shows the effect of the 12th-century Renaissance in its polish and in its reminiscences of classical poets. He describes King John as a raging madman who "emitted foam from his mouth".

The editions of the Chronicon de rebus gestis Ricardi Primi are:

- Richard of Devizes (1838), J. Stevenson (ed.), Chronicon Ricardi Divisiensis De rebus gestis Ricardi Primi, Eng. Historical Soc, OCLC 2198517, OL 20614414M
- by R. Howlett in Chronicles of the Reigns of Stephen, Henry II and Richard I, vol. iii. (Rolls Series, 1886);
- the Annales de Wintonia in HR Luard's Annales Monastici, vol. ii. (Rolls Series, London, 1864–69);
- by John T. Appleby in The chronicle of Richard of Devizes of the time of King Richard the First (Thomas Nelson & Sons Ltd, 1963).
