= History of Mohammedanism =

1818 Islamic studies book by Charles Mills

History of Mohammedanism is a work by Charles Mills.

This 19th-century book presents a biography of the prophet of Islam, and accounts of the empires founded by Muslims; an inquiry into the theological, moral, and judicial codes of the Islam, and the literature and sciences of the Saracens and Turks; with a view of the present extent and influence of Islam.

One edition was printed in London in 1818, there was also an 1817 version printed by the London publisher Black, Kingsbury, Parbury, and Allen (BKPA).
