= Charles Mills (historian) =

English historian (1788–1826)

Charles Mills (1788–1826) was an English historian. His works include History of the Crusades for the Recovery and Possession of the Holy Land, History of Mohammedanism and History of Chivalry.

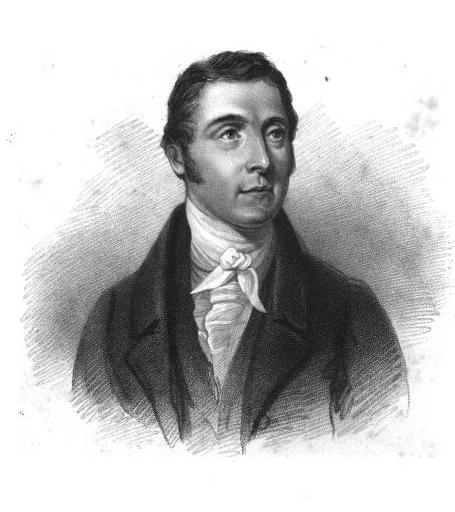
Charles Mills, engraving after a bust by Robert William Sievier

== Life ==
Born on 29 July 1788 at Croom's Hill, Greenwich, he was youngest son of Samuel Gillam Mills, a surgeon. He was educated privately, and, after a brief experience in a merchant's counting-house, was articled in 1804 to a firm of solicitors. In 1810 he placed himself for a year's study in conveyancing under James Humphreys.

Lung disease compelled Mills to winter in Nice in 1814–15. On inheriting a moderate fortune, he abandoned the law to write. He died of a recurrence of his old complaint at Southampton on 9 October 1826, unmarried. A few months before his death he was elected one of the knights of the British Order of Saint John, in recognition of his History of the Crusades.

Mills's friend Augustine Skottowe published a Memoir (1828). Another friend was William Frederick Deacon, who dedicated his Innkeeper's Album (1823) to Mills.

== Works ==
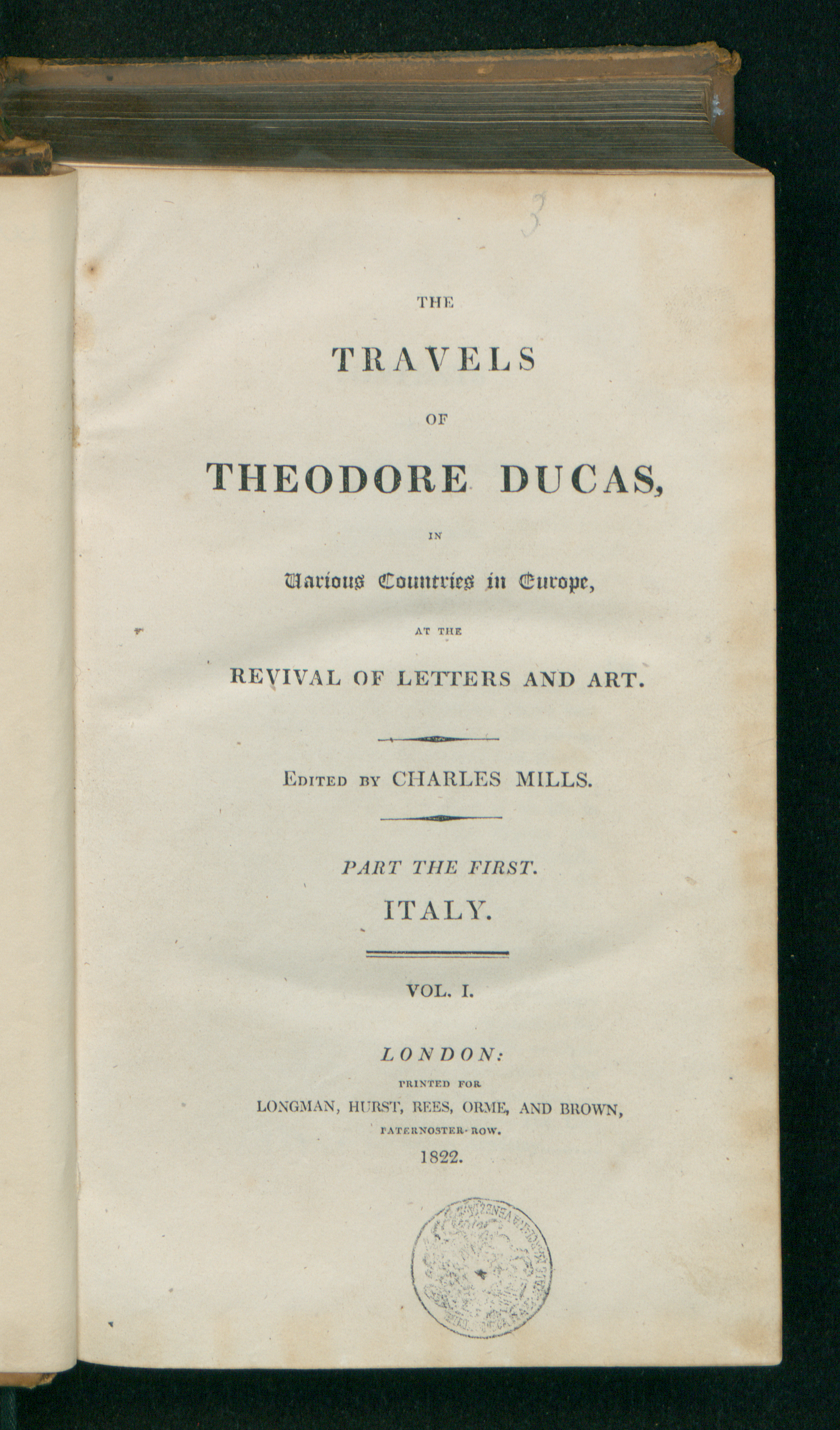
Travels of Theodore Ducas, 1822

Mills was a follower of Edward Gibbon. His first work, An History of Muhammedanism (London, 1817, 2nd edit. 1818), had been seen in manuscript by Sir John Malcolm, who supported its publication, and in the revision by loans from his own library. It was translated into French by Germain Buisson, Guernsey, 1826. His next book The History of the Crusades, 2 vols. London, 1820 (4th edit. 1828), bears fewer signs of the influence of Gibbon, and was praised by Sir Walter Scott, who assisted him with notes from Scottish chronicles. In turn, Scott used Mills' History of the Crusades as a source when writing his historical novel, The Talisman.

An imitation of the Travels of Anacharsis of Jean-Jacques Barthélemy, entitled The Travels of Theodore Ducas of Candia in Various Countries in Europe at the Revival of Letters and Art, 2 vols. London, 1822, followed. It proved unsuccessful, and only the first part Italy appeared. Mills's last book was The History of Chivalry, or Knighthood and its Times,’ 2 vols. London, 1825 (2nd edit. 1826). Mills's collected works were translated into French by Paul Tiby (7 vols. Paris, 1825).

== Notes ==
Attribution

This article incorporates text from a publication now in the public domain: "Mills, Charles". Dictionary of National Biography. London: Smith, Elder & Co. 1885–1900.
