= Alfred Hayes Jr. =

American politician

Alfred Hayes Jr. (October 13, 1873 – October 19, 1936) of Lewisburg, Pennsylvania and Greenwich, Connecticut was an American educator, common and constitutional lawyer, internationalist and Progressive Era advocate for Theodore Roosevelt's Progressive Party and the Bull Moose initiative.

== Expertise ==
Hayes was professor of law at the Cornell Law School (1907–1917), counsel for trusts while in private practice in New York City, and aided in reform of attorney ethical standards sponsored by the Law Reform Committee of the Bar Association, City of New York and the New York County Lawyers Association, Professional Ethics Committee. The latter effort produced standards which became a national model.

In a period when legal formalism dominated American bar deliberations and much of the academic endeavor supporting the practice of law and judicial decision-making, Professor Hayes was an advocate for vigorous administration of statutory laws, legislative appropriations for scientific ascertainment of the facts, and public education on the subject of environmental degradation caused by the Industrial revolution.

After graduating from Columbia Law School, Hayes specialized in bankruptcy law in practice with Coudert Brothers, Manhattan. The affiliation with Columbia Law continued as he served as Law Lecturer from 1902 to 1907, after which he temporarily left the practice of the law by taking a full-time position with the Cornell Faculty from 1907-1917. His later Manhattan law practice served clients among the large investment trusts of the financial services sector of the economy.

In the 1920s, Hayes went on to become President, Hayes-Jackson Corporation; trustee of the Mutual American Securities Trust; director and member New York Transfer Company, Property Committee, and director, American Railway Supply Company.

== Bull Moose ==
Hayes joined the National Progressive Party in 1912, following former president Theodore Roosevelt in advancing the Bull Moose Platform and serving as a delegate to the first Progressive Party national convention. Subsequently, he was that Party's 1912 and 1913 candidate for the Supreme Court, Sixth New York District. In 1913, he also won the endorsement of the Democratic Party.

Hayes was present as a Tompkins County delegate to the formation of the National Progressive Party of New York State, which began the Bull Moose movement focused on promoting and securing industrial and social justice and political liberty. The founding convention was headlined by General Daniel E. Sickles, U.S.A. (ret.) whose speech was a rejection of Woodrow Wilson's candidacy as supported by those supporting “. . . the wrong side of the rebellion.” After formation of the Progressive Party, the “Negro Question” threatened to compromise former president Theodore Roosevelt's leadership of the new movement. At issue was admission of African-American delegations to the party and convention. Professor Hayes joined with New York City interests to offer Roosevelt a compromise resolution thought to provide a middle path between the former president's position and that of the African-American leaders threatening to bolt for the Woodrow Wilson candidacy. The following year, Professor Hayes endorsed New York Governor William Sulzer in his campaign for direct election of United States Senators through the primary system.

During the campaigns for the Sixth Judicial District, New York State (1912–1913), Hayes public philosophy exhibited internationalist tendencies. He advocated acting on the basis that all men are brothers; striving “to reduce the differences between nations; differences in technical proficiency, in economic strength, in ethical ideals, to the end that, when public sentiment has reached the point where it insists that war must cease, conditions will be ripe for the substitution of other modes of action . . . . [t]he final goal is a parliament of the world, founded upon a true international democracy, knowing no prejudices of race, religion or social position, in which the affairs of the world may be directed in the spirit of wisdom and justice.

== Family ==
Born at Lewisburg, Pennsylvania in 1873, Hayes was son to Alfred Hayes Sr. and Mary Miles Valzah Hayes. The Hayeses descended from Scots-Irish settlers of central Pennsylvania emigrating from County Donegal, Ulster Province, British Empire. One of Alfred Jr.'s ancestors fought with the Pennsylvania militia at the battles of Trenton, Brandywine, Germantown, and Princeton. Another was Lieutenant General Thomas Sutherland and a third was Captain John Forster, father of General John Forster. Alfred, Senior was embarred in the State of Pennsylvania, served in the State Legislature, and was district attorney for Union County, Pennsylvania. Alfred Jr. prepared for collegiate studies at the Bucknell Academy and matriculated briefly at Bucknell University in AY1890-1891, tapping into the Phi Kappa Psi fraternity in 1891. In 1892, he transferred to Princeton College where he took his Bachelor of Arts and Master of Arts degrees in 1895 and 1896, respectively. A Juris Doctor was granted by Columbia Law School in 1889. Professor Hayes was spouse to Christine Grace Robertson of Chicago, Illinois. They married in 1905 and had one daughter and two sons: Christine M. Hayes, Alfred Hayes Jr., and Miles Van V. Hayes. His son Alfred Hayes became the chairman of the Federal Reserve Bank of New York, preceding Paul Volcker in that post. Retiring from the bar in 1933 after a stroke, Professor Hayes' health went into decline for three years prior to his death.

== Member ==
Alfred Hayes Jr. was a member of the Phi Beta Kappa academic honors fraternity, Phi Delta Phi professional law fraternity, the Sons of the American Revolution. He was awarded and a member, the Grecian Royal Order of the Saviour. Hayes' clubs were the Indian Harbor Yacht Club and the Field Club, Greenwich, Connecticut. At Cornell, he was a member and presented before the Ethics Club. He associated with the Phi Kappa Psi fraternity at Cornell, and through that organization, the Irving Literary Society.

== Sample Publications ==
- Alfred Hayes Jr., "Private Claims against Foreign Sovereigns," 38 Harv. L.Rev. 599 (1925).
- Alfred Hayes Jr., "Specific performance of contracts for arbitration or valuation," (Ithaca, 1916)( reprinted from 1 Cornell Law Quarterly, p. 225-256.).
- Alfred Hayes Jr. & William B. Hale, "Review of Handbook on the Law of Damages," 13 Colum. L.Rev 452 (1913).
- Alfred Hayes, "The Federation of the World," South Atlantic Quarterly 369, 372-373 (12:4)(Oct. 1913).
- Alfred Hayes Jr., "'Democracy, not revolution' : Prof. Hayes agrees with Col. Roosevelt's Columbus speech : Cornell University law professor strongly endorses the proposal to submit certain classes of judicial decisions to popular vote."(March 28, 1912)(reprinted from the Philadelphia North American).
- Alfred Hayes Jr. "Partial Unconstitutionality with Special Reference to the Corporation Tax," 11 Colum. L.Rev. 120 (1911).
- Alfred Hayes Jr., "The Relation of the Law to Public Health," The Popular Science Monthly 280 (March 1910).
