= Alfred Hayes (priest) =

Alfred Parker Hayes was Archdeacon of Calgary from 1919 to 1926.

Hayes was educated at Owens College and ordained in 1900. After curacies in Carlisle, Armathwaite, Halifax and Dalton-in-Furness he was Vicar of Lindal-in-Furness. After this he was Principal of Bishop Pinkham College and then Rector of High River. After his time in Calgary he held various administrative roles in the SPG.

He died on 16 April 1946; and his widow 8 years later.
