= History of the Crusades for the Recovery and Possession of the Holy Land =

1820 text

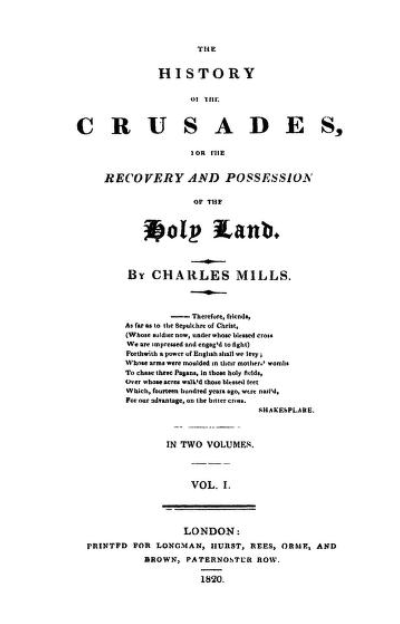
- Title page for History of the Crusades for the Recovery and Possession of the Holy Land (1820)
- Author: Charles Mills
- Language: English
- Genre: Non-fiction
- Publication date: 1820

The History of the Crusades for the Recovery and Possession of the Holy Land was a two-volume work published in 1820 by Charles Mills. It criticized David Hume and Edward Gibbon. Mills grouped the Crusades into nine entities:

- First Crusade and Crusade of 1101
- Second Crusade
- Third Crusade
- Crusade of 1197
- Fourth Crusade
- Fifth Crusade and Sixth Crusade
- Baron's Crusade
- Seventh Crusade
- Eighth Crusade and Lord Edward's Crusade.

Mills' work was not as dominant in his country as was that of Joseph François Michaud and Friedrich Wilken in theirs. Mills’ history also used the theme of the role of Richard I (the Lionheart) as a crusading and royal English parallel to Louis IX. His successors opened discussion in England of the Crusades as precursors of modern colonization, with a strong tinge of British Christian Zionism.
