= Bibliothèque des Écoles françaises d'Athènes et de Rome =

Published series of historical documents

Bibliothèque des Écoles françaises d'Athènes et de Rome ("Library of the French schools of Greece and Rome") is the name of two published series of historical documents, such as the letters of 13th century Popes during the Crusades.

Modern history books which cite excerpts from letters of the Crusades, often list the BEF in their citation.

The first series began publication in 1877.

The second series was published 1884–1960.

== Selected publications ==
=== First series ===
- Le liber censuum de l'Église romaine
- Sainte Catherine de Sienne: essai de critique des sources

=== Second series ===
- Les Registres d'Innocent IV (ed. Élie Berger, 4 vols., Paris, 1884–1921)
- Les Registres d'Alexandre IV (ed. C. Bourel de la Roncière, J. de Loye, P. de Cenival, and A. Coulon, 3 vols., Paris, 1902–1953)
- Les Registres d'Urbain IV (ed. Jean Guiraud, 4 vols., Paris, 1899–1929)
- Les Registres de Clément IV (ed. Edouard Jordan, 6 fasc., Paris, 1893–1945)
- Les Registres de Grégoire X et de Jean XXI (ed. Jean Guiraud and L. Cadier, 4 fasc., Paris, 1892–1906)
- Les Registres de Nicolas III (ed. Jules Gay [and Suzanne Vitte], fasc., Paris, 1898–1938)
- Les Registres de Martin IV (ed. F. Olivier-Martin et al., 3 fasc., Paris, 1901–1935)
- Les Registres d'Honorius IV (ed. Maurice Prou, Paris, 1886–1888)
- Les Registres de Nicolas IV (ed. Ernest Langlois, 9 fasc., Paris, 1886–1893)

Other correspondence includes that of:

- Innocent III, edited by Migne, P.L., vols. 214-16
- Honorius IV, Regesta, edited by Pressutti
- Gregory IX, Registres, Auvray

== See also ==
- French School at Athens
- Victorian societies for text publication
