= Alfred Hayes (poet) =

English poet and translator

Alfred Hayes (1857–1936) was an English poet and translator.

Son of E. J. Hayes, Town Clerk of Birmingham, Alfred Hayes was born at Wolverhampton in 1857, and educated at King Edward's School, Birmingham, and New College, Oxford. In 1906 he was the Secretary of the Midland Institute, Birmingham.

== Works ==
- The Cup of Quietness. By Alfred Hayes. London, Methuen, 1911, 61 p.
- The Last Crusade and Other Poems. By Alfred Hayes. Birmingham, Cornish Brothers, London, Simpkin, Marshall & Co.1887, 149 p. [4]
- The March of Man and Other Poems. By Alfred Hayes. London, New York, Macmillan, 1891, 177 p. [5]
- The Vale of Arden and Other Poems. By Alfred Hayes. London, John Lane at The Bodley Head, 1895, 90 p.
- Fellowship in Song, 1893 [6]
- From Inland Meadows [7]

His hymn "Two Thousand Troubled Years" (Christmas) was written at the request of a friend, circa 1896, and published with music by Sir F. Bridge (Novello & Co.). It was included in Horder's Worship Song, with Accompanying Tunes, 1905.

Hayes wrote the lyrics of the school song of King Edward's School, Birmingham. The lines from the chorus were used in the 1983 pop song "Ackee 1-2-3" by Birmingham band The Beat.

== Publications ==
- Boris Godunov; a drama in verse... by Alexander Pushkin. Rendered into English verse by Alfred Hayes, with preface by C. Nabokoff... London: K. Paul, Trench, Trubner & Co., Ltd.; New York: E. P. Dutton & Co. [1918.] vi, 117 p
- Hayes, Alfred. Pushkin's Boris Godunov. (Anglo-Russian Literary Society. Proceedings. London, 1918. no. 82, pp. 29–42.)
- "To a poet..." by Alexander Pushkin. translated by Alfred Hayes. (The Anglo-Russian Literary Society. Proceedings. London, 1919. no. 85, p. 93.).
