= List of sources for the Crusades =

Contemporary historiography of the Crusades

The list of sources for the Crusades provides those contemporaneous written accounts and other artifacts of the Crusades covering the period from the Council of Clermont in 1095 until the fall of Acre in 1291. These sources include chronicles, personal accounts, official documents and archaeological findings. As such, these lists provide the medieval historiography of the Crusades.

A number of 17th through 19th century historians published numerous collections of original sources of the Crusades. These include Recueil des historiens des croisades (RHC), Monumenta Germaniae Historica (MGH), Revue de l'Orient Latin/Archives de l'Orient Latin (ROL/AOL) and the Rolls Series. Other collections are of interest to the Crusader period include Recueil des historiens des Gaules et de la France (RHF), Rerum Italicarum scriptores (RISc), Patrologia Latina (MPL), Patrologia Graeco-Latina (MPG), Patrologia Orientalis (PO), Corpus Scriptorum Christianorum Orientalium (CSCO) and Palestine Pilgrims' Text Society (PPTS).

Modern reference material to these sources include Encyclopædia Britannica Eleventh Edition, Oxford Dictionary of Byzantium, Dictionary of National Biography, Neue Deutsche Biographie, Allgemeine Deutsche Biographie, Oxford Dictionary of the Christian Church, Oxford Dictionary of the Middle Ages, Catholic Encyclopedia, New Catholic Encyclopedia, Encyclopedia of the Medieval Chronicle, Encyclopædia Iranica, Encyclopædia Islamica and Encyclopaedia of Islam. Contemporary histories include the three-volume A History of the Crusades (1951–1954) by Steven Runciman; the Wisconsin collaborative study A History of the Crusades (1969–1989) edited by Kenneth M. Setton, particularly the Select Bibliography by Hans E. Mayer; Fordham University's Internet Medieval Sourcebook; and The Crusades: An Encyclopedia, edited by Alan V. Murray.

== Principal Western sources for the history of the Crusades ==
The Western sources for the history of the Crusades begin with the original Latin chronicles. Later works on the First Crusade were mostly derived from these and are exemplified by William of Tyre's Historia and its continuations. The later Crusades produced a vast library of first-hand accounts, biographies and chronicles. Other sources include official documents and communications, personal letters and accounts, and topics such as archaeology and numismatics.

=== Original Latin chronicles of the First Crusade ===
The major chronicles of the First Crusade by contemporaneous Western authors are:

- Gesta Francorum (Deeds of the Franks) is an anonymous chronicle that proved to be one of the most popular accounts of the First Crusade. The chronicle, also referred to as Anonymi Gesta Francorum, is reputed to be written by a follower of Bohemond of Taranto and covers the period from November 1095 until the battle of Ascalon in 1099. It was first published in late 1100 or early 1101. (Ges. D., RHC Oc, Volume 3.II,
- Peter Tudebode was a Poitevin priest in the army of Raymond of Saint-Gilles. His Historia de Hierosolymitano itinere, with Præfatio, was released shortly after the very similar Gesta Francorum, edited by French historian Jean Besly (1572–1644). Tudebode's version includes additional material, including the death of Crusader Rainald Porcet who died at the siege of Antioch in 1098. (RHC Oc., Volumes 3.I, 3.II, MPL 155,
- Historia belli sacri (Tudebodus imitatus et continuatus) was a history written by an unknown monk at the Abbey of Monte Cassino around 1130. The Historia covers the First Crusade and the early days of the Principality of Antioch ending with the death of Bohemond II of Antioch in 1130. The Historia drew material from Gesta Francorum and Gesta Tancredi. (RHC Oc., Volume 3.III,
- Raymond of Aguilers (died after 1105) was a participant in the First Crusade and eventually became chaplain of Raymond of Saint-Gilles. His chronicle, Historia Francorum qui ceperunt Iherusalem (History of the Franks who captured Jerusalem), known as Historia Francorum, concentrated on Raymond's exploits. The work covered the period from the journey to Constantinople in 1096 until the end of 1099, after the capture of Jerusalem. He may have had access to portions of Gesta Francorum but his work is regarded as independent. Pons of Balazun, a member of Raymond's army, is credited as a co-author of Historia Francorum. (RHC Oc., Volume 3.IV,
- Fulcher of Chartres (c. 1059 – after 1128) was a priest who participated in the First Crusade eventually joining Baldwin I of Jerusalem. His chronicle Gesta Francorum Iherusalem Perefrinantium (Historia Hierosolymitana) consists of three volumes. The first covers the period from the Council of Clermont in 1095 until the death of Godfrey of Bouillon in 1100. The second covers the reign of Baldwin I from 1100–1118, and the third the partial reign of Baldwin II of Jerusalem from 1118–1127 when the narrative was interrupted by the plague in Jerusalem. Because Fulcher was with Baldwin I in Edessa from 1098, some material in his chronicle was derived from Gesta Francorum and Historia Francorum. The three volumes were written from 1100–1106, 1109–1115 and 1118–1127, and compiled into a second edition by Fulcher before his death. (RHC Oc., Volume 3.V, VI,
- Albert of Aachen (died after 1150) was a historian, presumably German, who wrote the fullest contemporaneous account of the First Crusade in his Historia Hierosolymitanae expeditionis (History of the Expedition to Jerusalem). His chronicle covers the period from the Council of Clermont until 1121. It was written between 1125 and 1150, and has long been regarded as the most authoritative source of the period, but immune from criticism. (RHC Oc., Volume 4.III, Runciman (1951), pp. 331, 344,
- Ekkehard of Aura (died 1126) was a Bavarian abbot of Aura and participant in the Crusade of 1101. He wrote his Hierosolymita in five recensions from 1098-1125, covering first the period from 1057 through the First Crusade. The final recension is known as Chronicon universale (World Chronicle) and is an extension of the work of Frutolf of Michelsberg. The fourth recension of Hierosolymita makes use of Sigebert's Chronicon sive Chronographia providing a perspective on the Rhineland massacres of Jews in 1096. (RHC Oc., Volume 5.I, MGH Scriptores VI, MPL 156, Runciman (1951), p. 330)
- Robert of Reims, abbot of Saint-Remi (1055–1122), wrote his Historia Hierosolymitana that covers his participation at the Council of Clermont until as late as 1120. His history was written between 1107–1120 and is regarded as source material for the work of Gilo of Toucy. (RHC Oc., Volume 3.IX, pp. 717–882, MPL 155, Runciman (1951), pp. 330, 346)
- Baldric of Dol (1046–1130) was bishop of Dol-Bretagne when he wrote his Historiae Hierosolymitanae libri IV, an account of the First Crusade based on Gesta Francorum. His work was edited by Pierre de Maillezais. He also wrote Vita di Roberti de Arbrisello, a biography of Robert of Arbrissel. (RHC Oc., Volume 4.II, MPL 166, Aa. Ss. 6,
- Radulph of Caen (Ralph of Caen) (1080 – after 1130) was a Norman chaplain who wrote Gesta Tancredi in expeditione Hierosolymitana ("The Deeds of Tancred in the Crusade"). Ralph accompanied Bohemond of Taranto in 1107–1108, and wrote Gesta Tancredi in 1113. (RHC Oc., Volume 3.VIII, RISc 5, Runciman (1951), pp. 331, 346)
- Guibert of Nogent (1055–1124) was a Benedictine historian who wrote Dei gesta per Francos (Deeds of God through the Franks) based on Gesta Francorum and Gesta Tancredi. The history was written in 1108 and reworked in 1121. Dei gesta includes an account of the Council of Clermont and an eyewitness account of the preachings of Peter the Hermit.

Most of the original sources were collected in Gesta Dei per Francos (Ges. D.), compiled by French historian Jacques Bongars (1554–1612). The Gesta also includes works by William of Tyre, Marino Sanudo and Pierre Dubois.

=== Contemporaneous works on the First Crusade ===
Works derived from the original Latin sources written primarily in the early part of the 12th century are listed below.

Major Sources. Major contemporaneous sources that are frequently cited include the following.

- Bartolf of Nangis (died before 1109) was a French historian who, in 1108, published Gesta Francorum Iherusalem expugnatium that drew heavily on Gesta Francorum and Fulcher's now lost 1106 manuscript. (Runciman (1951), pp. 329, 344)
- William of Malmesbury (1095–1143) was a prominent English historian whose Gesta Regum Anglorum (Deeds of the Kings of the English) discusses the Council of Clermont based on Fulcher's Gesta Francorum Iherusalem Perefrinantium and includes an account of the White Ship disaster which claimed the lives of over 140 knights and noblemen including famed Crusader Ralph the Red. (MPL 179, Runciman (1951), pp. 329, 347)
- Richard of Poitiers (died 1174) was a French monk at Cluny Abbey who wrote Chronica Richardi Pictauiensis, monachus cluniacensis de diuersis libris collecta (The Chronicle of Richard of Poitiers), a chronicle of history from Genesis to the 1170s. His account of the Crusades were taken from Fulcher of Chartres. (Runciman (1951), p. 329)
- Sicard of Cremona (1155–1215) was an Italian prelate and historian who wrote his Chronica Universalis that covers universal history from the creation to 1213, includes material based on Fulcher of Chartres' work. His work was continued by Salimbene di Adam's Cronica. (MGH Scriptores XXXI, RISc 7, Runciman (1951), p. 329, Runciman (1952), p. 479, Runciman (1954), pp. 17n, 479)
- Hugh of Fleury (died after 1118), also known as Hugo Floriacensis or Hugo de S. Maria, was a French Benedictine monk who wrote Itineris Hierosolymitani Compendium based on Tudebode's Historia. (RHC Oc., Volume 5.VIII.vi, Runciman (1951), pp. 330, 345)
- Henry of Huntingdon (1088–1157) was an English historian whose De Captione Antiochiae is excerpted from his Historia Anglorum (The History of The English). It was written before 1129 and includes a section on the First Crusade based on Tudebode's Historia. (RHC Oc., Volume 5.VIII.x, Runciman (1951), pp. 330, 345)
- Caffaro di Rustico da Caschifellone (1080–1166) was a Genoese admiral and historian who wrote De liberatione civitatum Orientis (On the Liberation of the Cities of the East) and began the Annales ianuenses (Genoese annals). His work provides a Genoese perspective on the First Crusade and the Embriaco family. A later historian wrote Regni Ierosolimitani brevis hystoria, which is regarded as a continuation of Caffaro's De liberatione. (RHC Oc., Volume 5.II (De libertatione), Runciman (1951), pp. 332, 344, Runciman (1952), pp. 478n, 494)
- Walter the Chancellor (died after 1122) was a French or Norman Crusader who wrote Bella Antiochena (Wars of Antioch) covering the history of the Principality of Antioch from 1114–1122. He was likely present at the battle of Ager Sanguinis in 1119. Walter wrote his history between 1119 and 1122 while he was serving as chancellor of the principality. (MPL 155, RHC Oc., Volume 5.III, Runciman (1952), pp. 476, 495)
- Gilo of Toucy (died between 1139–1142) was a French poet and cleric who wrote Historia de via Hierosolymitana (Historia gestorum viæ nostri temporis Hierosolymitanæ), an epic verse history of the First Crusade covering the Council of Clermont through the capture of Jerusalem. The work was written before 1120 and it is believed that Gilo had access to participants. (RHC Oc., Volume 5.XIV, Runciman (1951), p. 345)
- Sigebert of Gembloux (1030–1112) was a Belgian Benedictine monk who wrote Chronicon sive Chronographia, a chronological survey covering 381–1111, with an emphasis on 1008–1111. His work also addresses the Rhineland massacres. A continuation of his work called Auctarium Gemblacense was written by Anselm of Gembloux (died 1136) and Guillaume de Nangis. (MGH Scriptores VI, VII, MPL 160, RHF, Runciman (1951), pp. 115n, 346, Runciman (1952), p. 479)

Later works. Works written sometime after the First Crusade, but still regarded as original sources include the following:

- Abridged version of Fulcher's Chronicle. Gesta Francorum Hierusalem expugantium is a shorter version of Fulcher of Chartres' Historia Hierosolymitana. Written ca. 1118, the work is cited separately in both RHC and a paper by Crusades historian Jay Rubenstein. (RHC Oc., Volume 3.VII, pp. 491–543)
- Præfatio to Tudebode's Historia. Joannis Besly Pictonis Præfatio is the preface by French historian Jean Besly (1572–1644) to Peter Tudebode's Historia de Hierosolymitano itinere, reproduced in Historiens occidentaux. Besly challenged the version of Gesta Francorum in the collection of Crusader works known as Gesta Dei per Francos. (RHC Oc., Volume 3, Preface, 3.I, 3.II, Ges. D., MPL 155 [Godefridum, Appendix II])
- Geoffroy of Vigeois (c. 1140 – after 1184), also known as Geoffroy du Breuil, was abbot of Vigeois and a historian who wrote his Chroniques covering the history of Limoges and its citizens from 994-1182. The Chroniques provide and account of the siege of Ma'arrat al-Nu'man of 1098 and the role of the Limogenese knight Gouffier of Lastours. It also discusses the rise of the Cathars. (RHC Oc., Volume 5, Preface, VIII.iii)
- Li Estoire de Jerusalem et d'Antioche. Li Estoire de Jerusalem et d'Antioche is an abbreviated, vernacular version of Fulcher of Chartres' Gesta Francorum Iherusalem Perefrinantium, with additional accounts written in various French dialects. It was written by unknown authors after 1250. (RHC Oc., Volume 5.XII)
- Benedetto Accolti (1415–1464), also known as Benedict Aretini Accolti, was an Italian historian who wrote De Bello a Christianis contra Barbaros gesto pro Christi Sepulchro et Judaea recuperandis libri IV (On the War carried on by the Christians against the Barbarians, for the Recovery of Christ's Sepulchre, and of Judea), a history of the First Crusade that is regarded as Crusader propaganda. Published in 1464, the sources are uncertain. (RHC Oc., Volume 5.XI, Runciman (1951), p. 344)
- Nomitia Historica. Godefridus Bullonius Nomitia Historica is a biography of Godfrey of Bouillon first appearing in Histoire littéraire de la France, tom. VIII. It draws on the works of William of Tyre and Orderic Vitalis. In the Patrologia Latina edition, the work appears with editions of: Gesta Tancredi (Radulph of Caen); Historia Francorum qui ceperunt Iherusalem (Raymond of Aguilers); Historia Hierosolymitana (Robert the Monk), Historia de Hierosolymitano itinere (Peter Tudebode), with Joannis Besly Pictonis Præfatio; Historia Hierosolymitana (Fulcher of Chartres); Historia gestorum viæ nostri temporis Hierosolymitanæ (Gilo of Toucy); Bella Antiochena (Walter the Chancellor); Liber Locorum Sanctorum Terræ Jerusalem (Rorgo Fretellus); Descriptio terrae sanctae (John of Würzburg); and Narrativ brevis belli sacri (Anonymous). (MPL 155 [Godefridum, Appendix II])

Minor works. Other works that are limited in scope, highly derivative or sparsely cited are listed below.

- Expeditio contra Turcos. by an anonymous author is a short account based on Tudebode's Historia. Expeditio is also known as Gesta Francorum et aliorum Hiersolymitanorum, seu Tudebodus abbreviatus. (RHC Oc., Volume 3.II, Runciman (1951), pp. 330, 345)
- Theodorus Palidensis. (died after 1197), a monk at Pöhlde Abbey, wrote a short piece called Narratio profectionis Godefridi ducis ad Jerusalem about the First Crusade, as part of the Annales Palidenses (Die Jahrbücher von Pöhlde). His work was based on that of Ekkehard of Aura. (RHC Oc., Volume 5.V, MGH Scriptores, XVI)
- Historia Nicaena vel Antiochena. The anonymous work Historia Nicaena vel Antiochena covers the period from before the Council of Clermont through the capture of Baldwin II of Jerusalem in 1123, covering all of the rulers of the kingdom up to that point. The work was commissioned by Baldwin III of Jerusalem and written in 1146. (RHC Oc., Volume 5.IV, Runciman (1951), p. 346)
- Frutolf of Michelsberg (died 1103) was a Bavarian prior who wrote a Chronicon universale (World Chronicle) covering Creation until 1099. His work was later extended by others including Ekkehard of Aura. (MGH Scriptores XXXIII, LXXII, Runciman (1951), p. 330)
- Balduini III Historiae Nicenae vel Antichenae. Balduini III Historiae Nicenae vel Antichenae is an anonymous history of the First Crusade with a continuation to 1123. Written in 1146–1147 under the direction of Baldwin III of Jerusalem, the account before 1100 is derivative of Fulcher of Chartres' Historia Hierosolymitana. The work was discovered and edited by French historian Edmond Martène in 1718. Also referred to as Monitum in Balduini III Historiae Nicenae vel Antichenae Prologum. (RHC Oc., Volume 5.IV, Runciman (1951), p. 346)
- Primi belli sacri Narrationes minors is a series of fourteen short narratives or excerpts written on the Crusades, collected in the Historiens occidentaux of RHC. These are: (i) Gesta peregrinorum Andegavensium; (ii) Dictamen de primordiis ecclesiæ Castaliensis (Geoffrey of Châlard); (iii) Notitæ Duæ Lemovicenses de Praedicatione Crucis; (iv) Gesta Adhemari, Episcopi Podiensis, Hiersolymitana; (v) Narratio Floriacensis; (vi) Itineris Hierosolymitani Compendium (Hugh of Fleury); (vii) Gesta Triumphalia Pisanorum; (viii) Chronicon breve Hierosolymitanum; (ix) Narrativ brevis belli sacri; (x) De Captione Antiochiae (Henry of Huntingdon); (xi) Breviarium Passagii in Terram Sanctam (Hugh of Lerchenfeld); (xii) Duellum Nicænum (Arnold of Lübeck); (xiii) Proæmium primi belli sacri (Jacques de Vitry); and (xiv) Exordium monastery S. Andreæ Brugensis. (RHC Oc., Volume 5.VIII)
- Gesta peregrinorum Andegavensium is an anonymous 12th century work describing portions of Fragmentum Historiae Andegavensis (History of Anjou), written by Fulk IV Rechin, dealing with the preaching of Urban II in northern France from 1095–1096 after the Council of Clermont. (RHC Oc., Volume 5.VIII.i)
- Geoffrey of Châlard (died 1125) founded the priory of Châlard in 1089 and his Dictamen de primordiis ecclesiæ Castaliensis provides an account of Urban II's preaching at Limoges late in 1095. Gouffier of Lastours attempted to convince Geoffrey to take the cross, but a vision of local martyr convinced him to stay at le Châlard. (RHC Oc., Volume 5.VIII.ii)
- Notitæ Duæ Lemovicenses de Praedicatione Crucis in Aquitania is an anonymous account of the events of the First Crusade in 1095-1097 including the Rhineland massacres. The work is derivative of Sigebert of Gembloux's Chronicon sive Chronographia and was attached to Chroniques of Geoffroy du Breuil. (RHC Oc., Volume 5.VIII.iii, Runciman (1951), pp. 136n, 346)
- Gesta Adhemari, Episcopi Podiensis, Hiersolymitana. Gesta Adhemari, Episcopi Podiensis, Hiersolymitana (Deeds of Adhemar, Bishop of Le Puy, in the Holy Land) is a short anonymous work describing Adhemar's leadership at Nicaea and Antioch, where he died in 1098. Gesta Adhemari is included in the Cartulaire de Saint-Chaffre. (RHC Oc., Volume 5.VIII.iv, Runciman (1951), pp. 110n, 345)
- Exordium monastery S. Andreæ Brugensis, from the Chronicle of the Abbey of Saint Andre of Bruges, edited by Arnold Goethals in 1504, covers the First Crusade from 1096-1098. (RHC Oc., Volume 5.VIII.xiv)
- Historia Gotfridi. Historia et Gesta Ducis Gotfridi seu historia de desidione Terræ sanctæ by anonymous German authors (Anonymi Rhenani) covers the First Crusade and the period from 1106-1191. It is derivative of the works of Bartolf of Nangis, Robert the Monk, Jacques de Vitry and Oliver of Paderborn, and was published in 1141. (RHC Oc., Volume 5.X, Runciman (1951), p. 345)
- Scriptores Minores Quinti Belli sacri (SMQBS) (alternately, Quinti Belli sacri scriptores minores) is a collection of minor works on the Crusades, edited by German historian Reinhold Röhricht. They include: (i) Ordinacio de predications Crucis in Anglia; (ii) Gesta crucigerorum Rhenanorum; (iii) Di Itinere Frisonum; (iv) Gesta obsidionis Damiata and Liber duelli Christiani in obsidione Damiatae exacti; and (v) La Prise de Damiette en 1219. (Runciman (1954), p. 494)

Other works that cover the First Crusade include Translatio Sancti Nicolai in Venetiam, Narratio Floriacensis, Solimarius by Gunther of Pairis and Breviarium Passagii in Terram Sanctam by Hugh of Lerchenfeld (see below). (Runciman (1951), p. 345)

=== Works of William of Tyre and continuations ===
William of Tyre (1130–1186) was a Jerusalem-born historian of French or Italian descent who is regarded as the greatest of the Crusade chroniclers. His Historia Rerum in Partibus Transmarinis Gestarum and continuations by later historians are key to the understanding of the period.

- William's major work Historia Rerum in Partibus Transmarinis Gestarum (History of Deeds Done Beyond the Sea) begins with the events of the First Crusade and goes through the events in the Holy Land through early 1184. It consists of twenty-three books written between 1170–1184. His account up through the capture of Jerusalem in 1099 is based on that of Albert of Aachen, and Fulcher of Chartres and Walter the Chancellor from 1100–1127. To a lesser extent, the history is also believed to be derivative of Raymond of Aguilers, Baldric of Dol and Usama ibn Munqidh. The period from 1127–1160 is based on official and personal records. (RHC Oc., Volumes 1, 2, MPL 202, Ges. D., Runciman (1951), pp. 331–332, Runciman (1952), pp. 476–477)
- Ernoul was a squire of Balian of Ibelin who wrote La Chronique d'Ernoul et de Bernard le trésorier (The Chronicle of Ernoul and Bernard the Treasurer) that covers the period 1183–1197 including an eyewitness account to the fall of Jerusalem in 1187, the news of which caused Urban III to die of shock. The work is regarded as an extension of William of Tyre's Historia. (RHC Oc., Volume 1, Runciman (1952), pp. 477–478, Runciman (1954), pp. 4n, 481–482)
- The Estoire d'Eracles émperor (History of Heraclius) is an anonymous history of Jerusalem from 630–1277. The work was written from 1205–1234 with additions from 1220–1277. Estoire d'Eracles draws from both Ernoul and Rothelin. (RHC Oc., Volume 2, Runciman (1952), p. 477, pp. 481–482)
- The Rothelin Continuation is an anonymous history covering the Holy Land from the period from 1229–1261, including the Barons' Crusade, the Seventh Crusade and the initial Mongol raids in 1260. It only survives as part of Estoire d'Eracles. (RHC Oc., Volume 2, Runciman (1954), p. 482)
- Itinerario di la Gran Militia, a la Pavese (Itinerary of the Great Army, in Pavese) is an anonymous 15th-century work on the First Crusade based on the work of William of Tyre. (RHC Oc., Volume 5.XIII).

=== French historical works and chansons ===
The Franks wrote many accounts of the Crusades, the most important of which were the chansons de geste (songs of heroic deeds) that formed the Crusade cycle. These include the Chanson d'Antioche and Chanson de Jérusalem. The Occitan Canso d'Antioca is in a similar format. They also provided many stories of chivalry which evolved after the Second Crusade. Additional historical material can be found in Recueil des historiens des Gaules et de la France (RHF) compiled by Martin Bouquet and in the publications of the Société de l'histoire de France (SHF).

Chansons and other writings

- Chanson d'Antioche is a chanson de geste said to be composed by one Richard the Pilgrim that describes the First Crusade from the original preaching through the taking of Antioch in 1098 and into 1099. While recognizing potential historical inaccuracies in the story, Chanson d'Antioche was a valuable resource in helping catalog participants in the early Crusades. (Runciman (1951), p. 332)
- Chanson de Jérusalem (Song of Jerusalem) is a 12th-century chanson de geste celebrating the capture of Jerusalem in 1099.
- Canso d'Antioca is an Occitan chanson de geste composed between 1108–1118 that describes the First Crusade up to the siege of Antioch in 1097–1098. (Runciman (1951), p. 332)
- Le Pèlerinage de Charlemagne (c. 1140) (Pilgrimage of Charlemagne or Charlemagne's Voyage to Jerusalem and Constantinople) is an Old French chanson de geste dealing with a fictional expedition by Charlemagne and his knights.
- Chanson du Chevalier au Cygne (c. 1192) is a chanson de geste based on the tale of the Knight of the Swan, reworked to have the hero a legendary ancestor of Godfrey of Bouillon. (Runciman (1951), pp. 332, 344)
- Chrétien de Troyes (fl. 1160 – 1191) was a French poet and trouvère who wrote a number of Arthurian romances and whose Conte du graal may have been inspired by Baldwin IV of Jerusalem. His work focused on chivalry and was influential among Crusaders.
- Jaufre Rudel (died after 1147) was an Occitan troubadour who likely died on the Second Crusade after writing chansons about his experiences. His fictionalized biography claims he was inspired to go on crusade upon hearing of the beauty of Melisende of Tripoli. (Runciman (1954), p. 490)
- Ordene de chevalerie (Order of Knighthood) is an Old French poem written c. 1220 and provides a fictional account of the Kingdom of Jerusalem before the Third Crusade. The work may have drawn on Conte du graal and is included in an Old French translation of William of Tyre.
- Giraut de Bornelh (c. 1138 – 1215) was a Provençal troubadour who took a pilgrimage to the Holy Land and may later have participated in the Third Crusade. Among his poems are a criticism of Gregory VIII on his relative inaction after the loss of Jerusalem in 1187. (Runciman (1954), p. 5n)
- Guyot of Provins (died after 1208) was a Cluniac trouvère and satirist who may have participated in the Third Crusade and Fourth Crusade. His six surviving songs were written around 1180. Following the sack of Constantinople in 1204, he questioned in his Œuvres why the pope would allow a Crusade against fellow Christians. (Runciman (1954), pp. 127–128, 496)
- Saladin in Literature. Saladin is depicted in many works, some partially historical. Estoires d'Outremer et de la naissance Salehadin (History of Overseas and of the birth of Saladin) is an anonymous account of the Crusades from 1099–1230, including a fictional account of Saladin as the descendant of a countess of Ponthieu. Ordene de chevalerie (Order of Knighthood) is a French poem (c. 1220) about the Kingdom of Jerusalem before the Third Crusade where Saladin becomes a knight. Dante's Divine Comedy depicts him as a virtuous non-Christian held in limbo.
- Guillem Figuera (died after 1244) was a French troubadour in the court of emperor Frederick II in the 1230s. His poem D'un sirventes far (sirventes against Rome) bitterly accused Rome of perfidy and was written in 1229 during the Albigensian Crusade. (Runciman (1954), pp. 128, 495)
- Raoul de Soissons (1210–1270) was a French trouvère who wrote seven chansons about his participation the Barons' Crusade, Seventh Crusade and Eighth Crusade, where is presumed to have died in 1270. He was married to Alice of Champagne and, with her, served as regent to Conrad II of Jerusalem.
- Le Tournoi de Chauvency. Jacques Bretel (fl. 1285) was a French trouvère who wrote Le Tournoi de Chauvency concerning the Tournament of Chauvency held in 1285 by Louis V, Count of Chiny, bringing together nearly 500 knights from around Europe. Many of the participants were past or future Crusaders. It is believed that Louis held the tournament to refute the story of the refusal of his direct ancestor Arnold I of Chiny to provide his sons to the army of Godfrey of Bouillon. Note that Arnold's daughter Helvide accompanied her husband Dodo of Cons with Godfrey on the First Crusade.
- Rutebeuf (fl. 1245 – 1285) was a French trouvère who wrote Onze Poèmes concernant la Croisade that includes elegies to Geoffrey of Sergines, Odo of Nevers, Theobald II of Navarre, and Alphonse of Poitiers. (Runciman (1954), p. 497)
- Geoffroi de Charny (1300–1356) was a French knight who was the author of several books on chivalry including the Book of Chivalry. He and his wife are the first recorded owners of the Shroud of Turin, lost after the sack of Constantinople in 1204 (see Robert de Clari below).

French chronicles, histories and biographies.

- Hincmar. Hincmar (806–882) was a French jurist and propagandist for Charles the Bald who struggled with papal authority including with Leo IV, Nicholas I and John VIII. He wrote the extension of Annales Bertiniani (Annals of St. Bertin's) begun by Prudentius of Troyes, continuing the work to 882, and Opera Omnia, containing the Epistolæ et decreta of John VIII as well as popes Marinus I and Adrian III. He also wrote De divortio Lotharii regis et Theutbergae reginae concerning king Lothair II. (MPL 125, 126, MGH Scriptores rer. Germ. V)
- Rodulfus Glaber. Rodulfus Glaber the Bald (985–1047) was a French monk and chronicler whose Historium Sui Temporis provides a history of the Franks from 900–1045. (RHF Vol X, Runciman (1951), pp. 46, 346)
- Fulbert of Chartres. Fulbert of Chartres (before 970 – 1028), bishop of Chartres, wrote his Epistolae in 1020 on the lord-vassal relationship at the request of William V, duke of Aquitaine. (RHF Vol X, MPL 141, Runciman (1951), pp. 85n, 345)
- Cartulaire de Saint-Chaffre. Cartulaire de Saint-Chaffre is a cartulary of the abbey of Saint-Chaffre (diocese of Le Puy-en-Velay) that includes an account of Guido II, bishop of Le Puy-en-Velay from 975–993 and the early life of Adhemar of Le Puy. The Cartulaire also includes the anonymous Gesta Adhemari, Episcopi Podiensis, Hiersolymitana, a short account of Adhemar's role in the First Crusade. (RHC Oc., Volume 5, Preface VIII.iv, Runciman (1951), pp. 85n, 110n, 344)
- Miracles de Saint-Benoît. Sur les Miracles de Saint-Benoît du Sault is an account of French history from 878–1050 by the monks of Fleury Abbey, most importantly by the chronicler Aimoin of Fleury (960–1010). The work discusses the Peace and Truce of God movement and the massacre of 700 clerics at Bénécy in 1038. (SHF, MGH Scriptores XXVI, Aa. Ss. OSB, Runciman (1951), pp. 86n, 346)
- Gesta Consulum Andegavorum. Gesta Consulum Andegavorum is a Latin work compiled by Jean de Marmoutier (fl. 1170) concerning the counts of Anjou from 1100–1140. It was edited and translated into the French work Chroniques des comtes d'Anjou et des seigneurs d'Amboise by Louis Halphen and René Poupardin.
- Historiae Gaufredi. Historiae Gaufredi ducis Normannorum et comitis Andegauorum is a biography of Geoffrey Plantagenet, duke of Normandy and count of Anjou, by Jean de Marmoutier (fl. 1170). Dedicated to Guillaume de Passavant, bishop of Le Mans from 1142–1186. Geoffrey was the father of Henry II of England.
- Chronicle of Saint-Pierre-le-Vif of Sens. Chronicon Sancti Petri Vivi Senonensis is an anonymous Latin chronicle written at the Abbey of Saint-Pierre-le-Vif between about 1100 and 1125 with continuations added into the 13th century.
- Thiou of Morigny. Thiou of Morigny was a chronicler at the abbey of Morigny who wrote Chronicon Mauriniacense covering French history from 1108–1147 and includes the genealogy of the houses of Montlhéry and Le Puiset. (RHF Vol XXII, Runciman (1952), pp. 190n, 248n, 253n, 494)
- Milites Regni Francaiæ. Milites Regni Francaiæ is an anonymous work that provided estimates of the size of French forces from Normandy during the reign of Philip II of France (1180–1223). (RHF Vol XXII, Runciman (1951), pp. 339n, 346)
- William le Breton. William le Breton (c.1165 – after 1226) was a French chronicler who wrote Gesta Philippi H. regis Francorum and Philippis about the life and times of Philip II of France (1180–1223). (Runciman (1954), pp. 36n, 52n, 497)
- Alberic of Trois-Fontaines. Alberic of Trois-Fontaines (died 1252) was a French chronicler whose Chronicon traces history from Creation until 1241. (RHF Vol XVIII, Runciman (1954), p. 494)
- Maius chronicon Lemovicense. The Maius chronicon Lemovicense or Great Chronicle of Limoges is a collection of 13th-century historical notices and chronicles of Limoges preserved in three related manuscripts.
- Guillaume de Nangis. Guillaume de Nangis (died 1300) was a French chronicler wrote his Chronicon, a history of the world from Creation until 1300, and is partially based on that of Sigebert of Gembloux. Some of his works are included in the Grandes Chroniques de France. His account of the White Ship disaster claimed that all men aboard were sodomites. (RHF Vol XX, Runciman (1952), p. 495)
- Grandes Chroniques de France. Grandes Chroniques de France is a compilation of the history of France produced between the 13th and 15th centuries. The original work traced the kings of the Franks from the origins until the death of Philip II of France in 1223, and extended at a later date to the death of Charles V of France in 1380.
- Gesta Dei per Francos (Ges. D.). Gesta Dei per Francos (God's Work through the Franks) is a collection of Crusader documents edited by French historian Jacques Bongars (1554–1612). The collection was published in 1611 and is considered the precursor to Recueil des historiens des croisades.
- Histoire littéraire de la France. Histoire littéraire de la France is a collection of the literature of France in 46 volumes, begun in 1733. Of interest to the Crusades is Tome VIII, edited by French Benedictine monk Antoine Rivetde La Grange (1683–1749), known as Dom Rivet. This volume includes biographies of Godfrey of Bouillon, Raymond of Aguilers and Peter Tudebode.

Miscellaneous works

Other chronicles cited in the histories include Annals of Vendôme (Chronicon Vindocinense seu de Aquaria), covering 768–1347, and Chronique de Saint-Maixent, covering 741–1140. (Runciman (1952), p. 494)

=== Hebrew accounts of the First Crusade ===
The Rhineland massacres of 1096 are the subject of three Hebrew chronicles.

- The Solomon bar Simpson Chronicle is an anonymous Hebrew narrative history concerning the Rhineland massacres written around 1140.
- Eliezer ben Nathan (1090–1170) was a halakist and poet who wrote of the Rhineland massacres through four pieces of liturgical verse known as Relation. A German translation is provided in Quellen zur Geschichte der Juden in Deutschland.
- Mainz Anonymous (The Narrative of the Old Persecutions) is a Hebrew account of the First Crusade with an emphasis on the massacres at Mainz.

=== History of the Latin East, 1100–1192 ===
Original sources after the capture of Jerusalem in 1099 include accounts of the Crusade of 1101 and subsequent developments, the Second Crusade (1147–1150), the capture of Jerusalem by Saladin in 1187 and the Third Crusade (1189–1192). These include the William of Tyre works as well as the following.

The Kingdom through the Second Crusade

- De expugnatione Lyxbonensi. De expugnatione Lyxbonensi is an anonymous chronicle probably written in the late 12th century by an Anglo-Norman priest. It describes the organization and the theological justification used by the Anglo-Norman Crusaders who aided the Portuguese in their conquest of the city of Lisbon (1147) during the Second Crusade.
- Historia Gothorum. Historia Gothorum were anonymous annals that were probably written in the late 12th century or early 13th century covering the life of Afonso I Henriques of Portugal. It contains a section that describes an early attempt by a group of Anglo-Norman Crusaders to take Lisbon as part of their sea journey to the Holy Land c. 1142.
- Narratio Floriacensis. Narratio Floriacensis de captis Antiochia et Hierosolyma, et obsess Dyrrachio is an anonymous chronicle written at Fleury in 1110 covering period from the siege of Antioch in 1098 through the end of the Crusade of Bohemond of Taranto of 1107-1108. In particular, it covers the role of Arnulf of Chocquesat the siege of Antioch, the army of William IX of Aquitaine in the Crusade of 1101 and the siege of Dyrrhachium of 1107–1108. (RHC Oc., Volume 5.VIII.v)
- Lisiard of Tours. Lisiard of Tours wrote his Historiae Hierosolimitanae Secunda Pars in 1168, covering the history of Jerusalem from 1099–1129. Some of the earlier material may be taken from Bartolf of Nangis. (RHC Oc., Vol 3.VII, Runciman (1951), pp. 329, 346)
- Passiones Sancti Thiemonis. The anonymous Passiones Sancti Thiemonis (Martyrdom of Bishop Thiemo) tells of the martyrdom of Thiemo, archbishop of Salzburg. In 1101, Thiemo joined William IX of Aquitaine in the Crusade of 1101. His martyrdom is described as his torture and death by pulling the intestines out of his body with a spindle. Otto of Freising repeated the story in his Historia de duabus civitatibus. (RHC Oc., Volume 5.VI, Runciman (1952), pp. 29, 495)
- Gesta Triumphalia Pisanorum. Gesta Triumphalia Pisanorum in Captione Jerusalem is a chronicle of Pisa and her support for the Crusades from 1098–1120, written by an unknown Pisan crusader. The work includes an account of the first siege of Arsuf of 1102. (RHC Oc., Volume 5.VIII.vii)
- Accounts of the Norwegian Crusade. Ágrip af Nóregskonungasögum is an anonymous history of the kings of Norway from 860-1136, written in 1190. The work includes an account of Sigurd the Crusader and the Norwegian Crusade of 1107–1111. A similar account is found in Sigurðar saga jórsalafara ok bræðra hans. The Knýtlinga saga concerning the Danish kings since the 10th century is also of interest. (Runciman (1952), pp. 93n, 497)
- Chronicon breve Hierosolymitanum. Chronicon breve Hierosolymitanum is a short chronology of the Crusades from 1097–1124, including the capture of Nicaea, Antioch, Jerusalem, Caesarea, Acre, Tripoli, Beirut, Sidon and Tyre, and the death of Baldwin I of Jerusalem in 1118. The work is contained in Époque féodale, les Capétiens jusqu'en 1180, edited by Auguste Molinier. (RHC Oc., Volume 5.VIII.viii)
- Narrativ brevis belli sacri. Anonymi Florinensis, Narrativ brevis belli sacri (A short narrative of the Holy War) is a history of the kingdom 1096–1128 by an anonymous author. It is based partially on the work of Sigebert of Gembloux. (RHC Oc., Volume 5.VIII.ix, MPL 155)
- Privilegium Pro Ecclesia Bethlehemitica. Privilegium Pro Ecclesia Bethlehemitica is the charter of Baldwin I of Jerusalem elevating Bethlehem from a priory to an episcopal see in the year 1110, as recounted by William of Tyre and reprinted in Patrologia Latina. (MPL 155 [Godefridum, Appendix II])
- Odo of Deuil. Odo of Deuil (1110–1162) was a French historian and participant in the Second Crusade as the chaplain to Louis VII of France. His De profectione Ludovici VII in Orientem (On Louis VII's journey to the East) covers the period from the origins of the Crusade in France to prior to the siege of Damascus in 1148. (Runciman (1952), p. 478)
- Otto of Freising. Otto of Freising (1114–1158) was a German historian and participant in the Second Crusade who wrote Gesta Friderici imperatoris (Deeds of Emperor Frederick) based on his experiences. The four books of Gesta Friderici cover the periods through the death of Holy Roman Emperor Conrad III, five years of rule by his successor Frederick I, and two books for the period from 1156–1170. The last two books were written by the chronicler Rahewin, possibly with Otto's help through 1158. He also wrote Chronica sive Historia de duabus civitatibus (History of the two cities) covering the history of Germany and Jerusalem through 1146. (Runciman (1952), p. 478)
- Annales Herbipolenses. Annales Herbipolenses (Annals of Würzburg) is a work by an anonymous cleric in Würburg is a history covering the Second Crusade from 1125–1158, with later material covering 1201–1204 and 1215. It is regarded as a continuation of Ekkehard of Aura's Chronicon universale and is included in Devastatio Constantinopolitana. (MGH Scriptores XVI.3, Runciman (1952), pp. 267n, 493)
- Suger of St. Denis. Suger of St. Denis (1081–1151) was a French abbot and historian who wrote Vita Ludovici regis, a biography of Louis VI of France, and Historia gloriosi regis Ludovici, a biography of Louis VII of France. (MPL 186, RHF, Runciman (1952), pp. 286n, 478, 495)
- Annales de le Terre Sainte. The anonymous Annales de le Terre Sainte, published sometime after the Second Crusade provides insight into the period from 1131–1222 and served as a source for other works such as Chronique de Terre Sainte. (AOL Vol II, Runciman (1952), pp. 478, 493, Runciman (1954), p. 482)
- Joseph ha-Kohen. Joseph ha-Kohen (1496-1575), also known as Joseph ben Joshua ben Meir, was a physician and writer whose Chronicle documented the massacre of Jews in the Rhineland in 1146 during the Second Crusade by a French monk named Radulphe. These atrocities are also described in St. Bernard's Epistolae. (Runciman (1952), pp. 255n, 497)

The loss of Jerusalem and the Third Crusade

- Libellus de Expugnatione Terrae Sanctae per Saladinum expeditione ("Little book about the conquest of the Holy Land by Saladin") or Chronicon Terrae Sanctae (Chronicle of the Holy Land) is an anonymous Latin work covering the fall of Jerusalem in 1187 to Saladin. The first part begins with the death of Baldwin V of Jerusalem in 1186 and ends with the surrender of Jerusalem to the Ayyubids in 1187. The second part relates the spread of the news of the surrender to Europe through the siege of Acre and arrival of the Third Crusaders in 1189. (Runciman (1952), pp. 478, 494)
- Tageno (died 1190) was a Bavarian clergyman and participant in the Third Crusade. His account Descriptio expeditionis Asiaticae Friderici (Description of the Asian Expedition of Frederick) has been described as a diary that covers the period 1189–1190. The work Historia de expeditione Friderici imperatoris is believed to be derivative of Tageno's. He died in Syria on the expedition.
- Magnus of Reichersberg (died 1195) was a German canon and historian whose chronicle of Reichersberg Abbey covers the years 1167–1195, including the role of Frederick I in the Third Crusade. His work includes Tageno's Descriptio is its entirety and was later extended to 1279.
- Historia de expeditione Friderici imperatoris. The anonymous Historia de expeditione Friderici imperatoris ("History of the Expedition of the Emperor Frederick"), or Espeditio Friderici Imperatoris, provides a history of the Third Crusade from 1189–1192 with an emphasis on the expedition of Frederick I Barbarossa including the battle of Iconium of 1190. The author may have been Ansbert (fl. 1190), an Austrian cleric and historian. (Runciman (1954), pp. 10–11n, 483, 495)
- History of the Pilgrims (Historia Peregrinorum) is an anonymous account of Frederick I during the Third Crusade. Its three parts discuss the conquests of Saladin, preparation for the crusade and the crusade itself. (MGH Scriptores rer. Germ. N.S. V, Runciman (1954), pp. 10–11n, 493, 496)
- Epistola de morte Friderici imperatoris is an anonymous account of the activities of Frederick I on Third Crusade.(MGH Scriptores rer. Germ. N.S. V, Runciman (1954), pp. 10n, 495)
- Arnold of Lübeck (died 1211/1214) was a Benedictine monk and chronicler who wrote Duellum Nicænum, a continuation of Helmold's Chronica Sclavorum until the year 1209. This includes accounts of Frederick I in the Third Crusade and his cousin Henry the Lion. (RHC Oc., Volume 5.VIII.xii, MGH Scriptores in usum scholarum, Runciman (1952), pp. 393n, 493, Runciman (1954), pp. 11n, 99n)
- De Expungnata Accone. De expugnata Accone liber tetrastichus seu rithmus de expeditione ierosolimitana was a poem about the siege of Acre of 1189–1191 by Aymar the Monk (Haymar Monachus, died 1202), Latin Patriarch of Jerusalem from 1194–1202. The work describes the death of Stephen I, Count of Sancerre late in 1190 and his brother Theobald V, Count of Blois a few months later in 1191. (Runciman (1954), pp. 32, 496)
- Deeds of Ludwig III of Thuringia. Landgraf Ludwigs Kreuzfahrt).Kreuzfahrt des Landgrafen Ludwigs des Frommen von Thüringen is an anonymous German poem written in 1301 dealing with the exploits of Louis III of Thuringia during the Third Crusade that also includes a description of the fall of Jerusalem and the call for the new Crusade.
- Itinerarium Regis Ricardi (Itnerarium Peregrinarum et Gesta Regis Ricardi) compiled by Richard de Templo and once attributed to medieval grammarian Geoffrey of Vinsauf, is an account to the Third Crusade from 1189–1192, with well-regarded accounts of Saladin's conquest of Jerusalem and the subsequent campaign of Richard I of England. (Rolls Series, Runciman (1952), pp. 324n, 494, Runciman (1954), pp. 5n, 19n, 483)
- Ambroise of Normandy (fl. 1190) was a Norman poet and chronicler who wrote of the Third Crusade in his Old French poems L´Estoire de la guerre sainte and Itinerarium regis Ricardi. Both works are regarded as historical sources of Richard I of England, beginning with his taking the cross as Count of Poitou in 1187. (MGH Scriptores XXVII, Runciman (1952), pp. 478–479, Runciman (1954), pp. 5n–9n, 483)
- Richard of Devizes (fl. 1190) was an English chronicler and monk who wrote Chronicon de rebus gestis Ricardi Primi covering the reign of Richard I of England from 1189–1192. Annales de Wintonia, an English chronicle through 1135, has also been attributed to him. (Rolls Series, Runciman (1954), pp. 482, 497)
- Roger of Howden (fl. 1174 – 1201) was an English chronicler who accompanied Richard I of England on the Third Crusade. His histories include Gesta Regis Ricardi and Gesta Henrici Regis Secundi. covering 1170–1192, Chronica, covering 732–1201. The Gesta Regis Ricardi provides insight into the aftermath of the loss of Jerusalem in Europe, with Joscius of Tyre attempting to reconcile Henry II of England and Philip II of France at the conference at Gisors. His work was previously attributed to Benedict of Peterborough. (Rolls Series, Runciman (1952), pp. 442n, 493, 495, Runciman (1954), pp. 5n-11n [as Benedict of Peterborough])
- Hugh of Lerchenfeld (died after 1201) wrote a continuation of Annales Ratisponensie ("Annals of Regensburg") called Breviarium Passagii in Terram Sanctam. The original Annales covered the period from the time of Christ until 1167, and Hugh extended it for the years 1173-1201 and it was later extended to 1216. He also added material on the First Crusade from Robert the Monk and Ekkehard of Aura. (RHC Oc., Volume 5.VIII.xi, MGH Scriptores XVII, Runciman (1951), p. 345)
- Saladin Tithe. The Saladin tithe of 1188 was a tax levied by Henry II of England to support the conduct of the Third Crusade. The tithe was issued by charter and reported in Gesta Regis Ricardi and Roger of Wendover's Flores Historiarum. The tithe was not without controversy, with attempted embezzlement by a Templar named Gilbert of Hoxton and William the Lion's refusal to collect. (Runciman (1954), pp. 6n, 8)
- Ralph de Diceto (Radulph of Diceto) (1120–1202) was Dean of St. Paul's Cathedral who wrote two books Abbreviationes chronicorum, based on the works of Robert of Torigni, and Ymagines historiarum that cover the periods from the birth of Christ until 1147, and from 1147–1202, respectively. (Rolls Series, Runciman (1952), p. 495, Runciman (1954), pp. 9n, 482)
- Peter of Blois. Peter of Blois (1130–1211) was a French theologian who wrote Passio Reginaldi, concerning the Third Crusade and the execution of Raynald of Châtillon by Saladin, Dialogus inter regem Henricum secundum et abbatem Bonnevallensem, about Henry II of England, and Conquestio de dilatione vie Ierosolimitane, concerning the fall of Jerusalem in 1187. (MPL 207)
- Narratio Itineris Navalis ad Terram Sanctam is an anonymous account of a Third Crusader's travel by ship to the Holy Land, stopping to conquer the Moorish city of Silves. (MGH Scriptores rer. Germ. N.S. V, Runciman (1954), pp. 9n, 496)
- Gesta Philippi Augusti. Rigord (1150–1209) was a French chronicler who wrote Gesta Philippi Augusti, covering the reign of Philip II of France from 1179–1206, including his role in the Third Crusade. (Runciman (1954), pp. 9n, 483, 497)
- Die Briefe des Canonicus was a chronicle of the Third Crusade written by Guy of Bazoches (before 1146 – 1203), a French cleric had taken part in the retinue of Henry II of Champagne.
- Chronicle of Richard the First's Crusade is an account by Geoffrey of Vinsauf (fl. 1200). In Chronicles of the Crusades (1848), published in Bohn's Libraries.

Related histories.

- Historia Rerum Anglicarum. William of Newburgh (1136–1198) was an English historian who wrote Historia rerum Anglicarum (History of English Affairs). Also known as Historia de rebus anglicis, the work covers the period from 1066–1195. (Runciman (1954), pp. 482, 498)
- Orderic Vitalis (1075–1142) was an English chronicler who wrote Historia Ecclesiastica, a general social history of medieval England that includes a section on the First Crusade, with an emphasis on Robert Curthose, Duke of Normandy. The account begins with the Council of Clermont and goes through the 1137 submission of Raymond of Poitiers to emperor John II Komnenos. His Historia draws heavily on Fulcher's Gesta Francorum Iherusalem Perefrinantium and his friend Baldric's Historiae Hierosolymitanae libri IV. He also contributed to the continuation of Gesta Normannorum Ducum. (MPL 188, Runciman (1951), pp. 111n, 346, Runciman (1952), p. 479)
- The Novgorod First Chronicle provides a history of Novgorodian Rus' from 1016–1471, including discussions of the fall of Constantinople in 1204 and the Mongol invasion of the West. (Runciman (1954), pp. 117n, 122n, 247n, 499)
- The Melisende Psalter is a manuscript commissioned around 1135 by Fulk of Jerusalem for his wife Melisende. The historical value of the psalter is for its contribution to the understanding of Crusader art, but also provides a calendar of event relating to the Kingdom of Jerusalem.

=== Gestes des Chiprois ===
Les Gestes des Chiprois (Deeds of the Cypriots) is an Old French chronicle of the history of the Crusader states and Kingdom of Cyprus between 1132 and 1309. The work was based on previous and original sources, and was completed in 1315–1320. The anonymous author was likely from Tyre, becoming a member of the chancery of the Knights Templar. Gestes des Chiprois and the work and continuations of William of Tyre form the basis of the study of Outremer after the Third Crusade. The chronicle is in three parts: Chronique de Terre Sainte, Philip of Navarro's History, and Chronique du Templier de Tyr.

- Chronique de Terre Sainte. The anonymous Chronique de Terre Sainte covers the period from 1131–1222 and is based on the Annales de le Terre Sainte. Its brief narrative serves as the beginning portion of Gestes des Chiprois. (Runciman (1954), p. 482)
- Philip of Novara's History. Philip of Novara (1200–1270) was an Italian historian who wrote History of the War between the Emperor Frederick and Sir John of Ibelin, covering the period 1223–1242, and is included in Gestes des Chiprois, which also five poems written by Philip on particular episodes during the war. Philip's Le Livre de forme de plait is part of the Assizes of Jerusalem. (RHC Lois, Volume 1.IV,
- Chronique du Templier de Tir. is attributed to an unknown author referred to as the Templar of Tyre (fl. 1315–1320), and draws on Estoire d'Eracles through 1170 and his own experiences and oral testimony for the history through 1309. The work includes one of only two eyewitness accounts of the fall of Acre in 1291 and the trial of the Knights Templar in 1311.

Templar of Tyre may be Gérard de Monréal, secretary to Guillaume de Beaujeu, Grand Master of the Knights Templar, who died at the siege. (RHC Ar., Volume 2.VI, AOL Vol XIIIe, XIVe,

=== Sources for the history of the later Crusades, 1192–1291 ===
The history of the later Crusades from the Fourth Crusade (1202–1204) through the siege of Acre in 1291 is found in the sources below.

- Geoffrey of Villehardouin (1150–1215) was a knight and historian who wrote his chronicle De la Conquête de Constantinople (On the Conquest of Constantinople) on the Fourth Crusade based on his experiences in the endeavor. The history, written in 1207, describes the sack of Constantinople in 1204 and provides a list of German Crusaders. (Runciman (1954), pp. 110n, 483, 497)
- Robert de Clari (died after 1216) was a knight who participated in the Fourth Crusade and wrote La Conquête de Constantinople which covers the period 1202–1205. He was one of the last to see the Shroud of Turin prior to the sack of Constantinople in 1204 (see Geoffroi de Charny above) and participated in the plunder of relics from the city. La Conquête provides a list of French participants in the Fourth Crusade. (Runciman (1954), pp. 110n, 483, 497)
- Devastatio Constantinopolitana was an anonymous account of the Fourth Crusade from the preaching of Peter of Capua in 1198 until after the sack of Constantinople in 1204. The work also includes the accounts of the Crusade of 1101 and Second Crusade. The surviving manuscript includes Ekkehard of Aura's Chronicon universale and the anonymous Annales Herbipolenses. (Runciman (1954), pp. 119, 495)
- Martin of Pairis (fl. 1200–1207) was abbot of the monastery of Pairis who traveled on the Fourth Crusade. He was a major source for Gunther of Pairis' Historia Constantinopolitana and wrote of the translation of relics he brought to Pairis from the Crusade.
- Gunther of Pairis (1150–1220) was a German monk, who wrote Historia Constantinopolitana about the Fourth Crusade, Solimarius about the First Crusade and an epic Ligurinus about Frederick I. Martin of Pairis was a source for Gunther's Historia. Gunther celebrated Martin's plunder of relics from Constantinople, deeming the Byzantines insufficient to hold such sacred treasures. (AOL Vol I, Runciman (1951), pp. 332, 345, as Gunther of Basle, Runciman (1954), p. 496)
- Anonymus Halberstadensis. (Anonymous of Halberstadt) wrote the Deeds of the Bishops of Halberstadt as a defense of bishop Conrad of Krosigk, a participant in the Fourth Crusade, who triumphantly returned to Germany with numerous relics from the Holy Land including holy thorns and hair of the Virgin Mary. He also wrote De Peregrinatione in Greciam on his pilgrimage to Greece. (Runciman (1954), p. 495)
- The Chronica Regia Coloniesis (Royal Chronicle of Cologne) is a Latin text that provides the history of the Frankish kings, Byzantine emperors and German kings and emperors from 576–1202. The work through 1106 depends on the Chronicon universale of Ekkehard of Aura. It was continued through 1237 in Chronica sancti Pantaleonis. (MGH Scriptores in usum scholarum, Runciman (1954), p. 495)
- Ralph of Coggeshall. Ralph of Coggeshall (died after 1227) was an English chronicler who continued a Chronicon Anglicanum from the years 1187–1224, concentrating on the Third and Fourth Crusades. Chronicon Anglicanum draws upon Chronicon Terræ Sanctæ, which was once attributed to him. (Rolls Series, Runciman (1952), p. 495)
- Compilation of the Fourth Crusade. The collection Translations and Reprints from the Original Sources of European History (1894–1900) contains a compilation (Volume 3.I) of original sources of the Fourth Crusade, edited by Dana Carleton Munro (1866–1933). The sources are excerpted, arranged as a chronology.
- Peter of Vaux-de-Cernay (died c. 1218) was a Cistercian monk of Vaux-de-Cernay Abbey who wrote Historia Albigensis, a chronicle of the Albigensian Crusade.
- Jacques de Vitry (James of Vitry) (1160/1170–1240) was a theologian and historian who wrote Historia Orientalis (Historia Hierosolymitana) and Epistolae on the history of the Holy Land from the advent of Islam until the Fifth Crusade. Afterwards he helped organized the Sixth Crusade. The first part of Historia Orientalis appears in Historiens occidentaux as Proæmium primi belli sacri, covering the years 1095-1098. (RHC Oc., Volume 5.VIII.xiii, Ges. D., PPTS XI.2, Runciman (1954), pp. 167n, 483, 485, 497)
- Cardinal Oliver of Paderborn (died 1227), also known as Oliverus scholasticus, wrote his Historia Damiatina reflecting his experience in the Fifth Crusade. Historia Damiatina, De Itinere Frisonum and Gesta Crucigerorum Rhenanorum are critical sources for the Fifth Crusade. [Opera, I. Historia Damiatina, II. Epistolae])
- Roger of Wendover (died 1236) was an English chronicler who wrote a version of Flores Historiarum (Flowers of History) covering the period from 1188 through the Fifth Crusade, identifying the English participants including Ranulf de Blondeville, Earl of Chester, William d'Aubigny, Earl of Arundel, William de Ferrers, Earl of Derby, and Saer de Quincy, Earl of Winchester. (MGH Scriptores XXVIII, Rolls Series, Runciman (1954), pp. 8n, 155n, 496, 497)
- Gesta Crucigerorum Rhenanorum is an anonymous Latin eyewitness account of the Fifth Crusade written by a cleric who travelled with a fleet from the Rhineland. It covers the period 1217–1219 and was written shortly after the capture of Damietta. It ends with the return of the Rhenish crusaders and does not describe the disastrous end of the Crusade.
- De itinere Frisonum is an eyewitness account of the journey of the Frisian crusading fleet from Friesland to Acre in 1217 to participate in the Fifth Crusade. The work describes the motivation of the participants regarding a series of raids against the Andalusi settlements of Faro, Rota and Cadiz. The work is related to the anonymous Gesta Crucigerorum Rhenanorum, a narrative of the Fifth Crusade. (Runciman (1954), pp. 147, 495)
- Historia Albigensis. is a chronicle of the Albigensian Crusade, by Cistercian monk and chronicler Peter of Vaux de Cernay (died c. 1218). (MPL 213)
- Joannes de Thurocz (1435 – c.1489) was a Hungarian historian whose Chronica Hungarorum covers through 1487, including a narrative of Andrew II of Hungary during the Fifth Crusade. Andrew's major activity consisted of the collection relics including the jug of the marriage at Cana, and the heads of Saint Stephen and Margaret of Antioch. After the death of Hugh I of Cyprus in 1218, Andrew departed, despite the pleading of Raoul of Mérencourt, Latin Patriarch of Jerusalem, returning to Europe with his relics. Safe passage granted by the Seljuk sultan Kaykaus I. (Runciman (1954), pp. 148n, 149n, 497)
- Freidank. Freidank (died 1233) was a German poet who wrote Bescheidenheit (practical wisdom, correct judgement, discretion) which provided an eyewitness account of the city of Acre during the Sixth Crusade.
- Philippe Mouskes. Philippe Mouskes (before 1220 – 1282) was the author of Chronique rimée, a rhymed chronicle that draws on the history of the Franks, from their origins until 1242.
- Speculum Historiale. Vincent of Beauvais (1184–1264) was a French Dominican friar who wrote the encyclopedic Speculum Maius (Great Mirror). The part of the work called Speculum Historiale (Mirror of History), translated by Jean de Vignay, is a universal history from Creation to at least 1250. The work includes discussions on the First Crusade on through the Seventh Crusade. (Runciman (1954), pp. 78, 261n, 497)
- Jean de Joinville. Jean de Joinville (1224–1317) was a French chronicler who wrote the influential Life of Saint Louis, a biography of Louis IX of France. Joinville accompanied Louis on the Seventh Crusade and Eighth Crusade and wrote his biography between 1305–1309, relying on the Grandes Chroniques de France for events after 1254. He was with Louis during his captivity by the Egyptians in 1250 after the battle of al-Mansurah and reported interactions of the king with the Assassins. (Runciman (1954), p. 484)
- Epistola ad subditos suos in regno Franciae constitutos. In a letter to the kingdom, Epistola ad subditos suos in regno Franciae constitutos, de captione et liberatione sua, scripta in Acon, anno Domini 1250, announces the capture and release of Louis IX of France by the Mamluks in 1250. It was sent after the king had relocated to Acre. (MPL 155 [Godefridum, Appendix II], Ges. D., Runciman (1954), pp. 270–272, 496)
- William de St. Pathus. William de St. Pathus (1250–1350) was a Franciscan friar who wrote Vie de Saint Louis, a biography of Louis IX of France. From 1277-1295 he was confessor to Louis' wife Margaret of Provence. (Runciman (1954), pp. 280n, 498)
- Matthew Paris. Matthew Paris (1200–1259) was an English chronicler who wrote Chronica Majora presenting a universal history from Creation until 1259. His work includes in-depth discussions of the battle of Hattin in 1187 and Frederick II and the Fifth and Sixth Crusades. Chronica contains one of the earliest surviving maps of the Holy Land. He also wrote Abbreviatio chronicorum (Historia Minora) covering 1067–1253, remaining unfinished at his death. (Rolls Series, Runciman (1954), pp. 434, 496).
- Primat of Saint-Denis. Primat of Saint-Denis (died c. 1277) was a French Benedictine monk and historian of the abbey of Saint-Denis. He wrote Roman des rois (Romance of Kings) tracing the kings of the Franks from the origins until the death of Philip II of France in 1223 and extended at a later date to the death of Charles V of France in 1380.
- Fidentius of Padua. Fidentius (Fidenzio) of Padua (before 1226 – after 1291) was a Franciscan friar and historian who published Liber recuperations Terre Sancte, a history of the Holy Land and approaches to retaking the Kingdom of Jerusalem, delivered to pope Nicholas IV. Liber also included an adverse biography of Muhammad. (Runciman (1954), pp. 430–431, 495)
- Tolomeo of Lucca. Bartholomew of Lucca (1236–1327), also known as Tolomeo, was an Italian historian who wrote Annales Luccienses covering events in Italy from 1061–1303. (MGH Scriptores (new series), VIII, Runciman (1951), p. 346)
- Thaddeus of Naples. Thaddeus of Naples wrote Hystoria de desolacione civitatis Acconensis based on eyewitness accounts of the fall of Acre of 1291. It is supplemented by the De excisions urbis acconis, an anonymous account of the siege of Acre, and Gestes des Chiprois. (Runciman (1954), pp. 414n, 484, 495)

=== Related histories and other works ===
Other histories and literary works with limited discussion of the Crusade but still of interest have been cited by modern historians. These works include annals and poems, primarily Italian, German and English, providing accounts of European actives prior to 1095. Some of these are presented below.

Italian works

- Goffredo Malaterra. Goffredo Malaterra (fl. 1099) was a Benedictine monk and historian who wrote De Rebus Gestis Rogerii Calabriae et Siciliae Comitis et Roberti Guiscardi Ducis fratris eius which chronicles the Norman conquest of Italy in the mid-11th century, including Robert Guiscard. Related contemporaneous works include the poem Gesta Roberti Wiscardi by William of Apulia and L'Ystoire de li Normant (History of the Normans) and Chronicon by Amatus of Montecassino. (MPL 149, RISc 5, Runciman (1951), pp. 37n, 100n, 344, 346)
- Amatus of Montecassino. Amatus of Montecassino (Aimé of Monte Cassino) (fl. 11th century) was a Benedictine monk and historian whose works L'Ystoire de li Normant (History of the Normans) and Chronicon are principal sources for the Norman conquest of Italy. Amatus provides an account of a rich man from Amalfi who in 1023 financed hospitals in Jerusalem and Antioch. (Fonti per la Storia d'Italia, Lib VIII.3)
- Bariot Chronicles. The major chronicles of Bari and southern Italy are Annales Barenses (anonymous, covering 605–1102), Annales Lupi Protospatharii (Lupus of Apulia, covering 805–1102) and Anonymi Barensis Chronicon (or Chronicon Barense, anonymous, covering 855–1118). Topics of the works include the Norman conquest of Italy and material on the First Crusade. (MGH Scriptores V, RISc 5, MPL 155, Runciman (1951), p. 344, Runciman (1952), pp. 47n, 493)
- Annales Beneventani. Annales Beneventani covers the history of the Santa Sophia monastery in Benevento from the time of Christ until 1128 in three editions. The later Annales Palidenses includes a history of Rome in the 11th and 12 centuries. Both include material on pope Paschal II (1099-1118). (MGH Scriptores III, V, Runciman (1952), pp. 35n, 105n, 493)
- Annales Pisani. Bernardus Marago (1108/1110-1188) was an Italian noble from Pisa who wrote Annales Pisani, the civic annals of Pisa, covering topics that include the Pisan-Genoese expeditions to Sardina from 1015-1016 and the early history of Daimbert of Pisa. (MGH Scriptores XIX, Runciman (1951), pp. 299n, 344)
- Landulph of Saint Paul. Landolph of Saint Paul (fl. 1077–1137), also known as Landulf Junior to distinguish him from Landulf of Milan, was an Italian historian who wrote Historia Mediolanensis (A Milanese History) concerning the events in Italy at the turn of the 12th century. (Runciman (1952), p. 494)
- Chronica Monasterii Casinensis. Chronica Monasterii Casinensis was a history of the monastery of Monte Cassino from 1075–1138, begun by Leo of Ostio (1046–1117) and completed by Peter Diaconus (1107-ca.1140). (MGH Scriptores VII, RISc 4, MPL 173, Runciman (1951), pp. 88n, 346, Runciman (1952), pp. 211n, 495)
- Romuald of Salerno. Romuald Guarna (1110/1120–1182) was archbishop of Salerno and wrote Chronicon sive Annales covering the history of southern Italy and Sicily from Creation until 1178. (MGH Scriptores XIX, Runciman (1952), p. 495)
- Cronichetta Lucchese. Cronichetta Lucchese is an Italian chronicle covering the history of Lucca from 752-1304. This may be the work quoted by Ferdinand Chalandon in his Histoire de la Première Croisade jusqu'à l'élection de Godefroi de Bouillon. In a letter from the clergy of Lucca, the despair of the Crusaders at the siege of Antioch in 1098 is described. (Runciman (1951), pp. 238n, 338, 344, DK XVII)
- Annales ianuesses. The Annales ianuenses (Geneose Annals) are the official history of Genoa, covering the period 1099–1234. They were begun by Caffaro di Rustico after 1156 following his history of the First Crusade. In 1163, the work was continued by various officials and finished by a scribe named Ogerius. (MGH Scriptores XVIII, Runciman (1954), p. 495)
- Peter of Eboli. Peter of Eboli (f. 1194-1221) was an Italian poet and chronicler whose Liber ad honorem Augusti, sive de rebus Siculis (Book to honor the Emperor, or the Affairs of Sicily) relates the death of William II of Sicily in 1189 and his succession by Tancred of Lecce. (Runciman (1954), p. 9n)
- Richard of San Germano. Richard of San Germano (before 1170 – after 1243) was an Italian notary, later chamberlain to emperor Frederick II who wrote his Chronica regni Siciliae, covering the history of southern Italy from the death of William II of Sicily in 1189 until 1243. This is the principal source for the War of the Keys. (MGH Scriptores XIX, RISc 2,
- Sequentia Andegavensis. Sequentia Andegavensis is a collection of hymns sung in Western Europe to celebrate the fall of Constantinople (Constantinopolitana Civitas diu profana) in 1204. Reprinted in P. Riant's, Exuviae. (Runciman (1954), pp. 128n, 497)
- Salimbene di Adam. Salimbene di Adam (1221-c. 1290) was a Franciscan friar and chronicler whose main work Cronica covers Italian history from 1167-1287. The work makes extensive use of Sicard of Cremona's Chronica Universalis. He also wrote The Twelve Calamities of Emperor Frederick II, a critique of the emperor and questioning the crusading movement. (Runciman (1954), pp. 281n, 497)
- Bartholomaeus of Neocastro. Bartholomaeus of Neocastro (1240–1293), known as Bartholomew, was an Italian jurist who wrote a chronicle Historia Sicula concerning the Kingdom of Sicily and Kingdom of Naples from the death of emperor Frederick II in 1250 until 1293. (RISc 13, Runciman (1954), p. 495)
- Jacobus de Auria. Jacobus de Auria (fl. 1280–1294) wrote his Annales covering this history of Genoa from 1280–1294. They were continued through 1436 by the Castigatissimi Annali di Genova of Agostino Giustiniani. (MGH Scriptores XVIII, Runciman (1954), p. 495)

German works

- Annales Altahenses. Annales Altahenses (Annals of Niederaltaich) are a set of annals compiled at the Niederaltaich Abbey covering a period 708-1073. The work covers the German pilgrimage of 1064-1065 to Jerusalem. (MGH Scriptores XX, Runciman (1951), pp. 49n, 344)
- Cosmas of Prague. Cosmas of Prague (c. 1045–1125) was a Bohemian historian whose Chronica Boemorum covers Bohemian history from Creation until 1125, and includes an account of the Crusaders traversing of Bohemia and Hungary in 1096. (MGH Scriptores VII,
- Annales Palidenses. Annales Palidenses, also known as Pöhlder Chronik, are a set of annals written at Pöhlde Abbey in the later 12th century, based partially on the work of Honorius Augustodunensis (1080–1154), Ekkehard of Aura and Sigebert of Gembloux. The annals include an account of the First Crusade and the exploits of Conrad III of Germany during the Second Crusade. (MGH Scriptores XVI, Runciman (1952), pp. 268n, 285n, 493)
- Helmold of Bosau (c. 1120 – after 1177) was a Saxon historian whose Chronica Sclavorum (Chronicle of the Slavs) is a chronicle of the northwestern Slavic tribes up to 1171. It was continued by Arnold of Lübeck. (MGH Scriptores in usum scholarum)
- Otto of Sankt Blasien. Otto of Sankt Blasien (Saint Blaise) (died 1223) was a German chronicler who wrote his annals Ad librum VII chronici Ottonis Frisingensis episcopi continuatae historiae appendix sive Continuatio Sanblasian covering the period of German history from 1146–1209. (MGH Scriptores XX, Runciman (1952), p. 495, Runciman (1954), pp. 14–17n, 497)
- Friedrich von Hausen. Frederick von Hausen (1150–1190) was a German poet who accompanied Frederick I on the Third Crusade. He wrote five works based on his experiences and was one of the earliest of the minnesingers. He died at the battle of Philomelion of 1190. (Runciman (1954), p. 490n)
- Wolfram von Eschenbach. Wolfram von Eschenbach (1160/1180-c.1220) was a German knight and minnesinger whose work including Parzival was an inspiration to Crusaders.
- Works from Tegernsee Abbey. Works from the German Tegernsee Abbey include the Expeditio Ierosolimitana, an epic poem about the First Crusade written by Bavarian monk Metellus of Tegernsee (died after 1170) and songs by famed minnesinger Walther von der Vogelweide (1170–1230).
- Albrecht von Johansdorf. Albrecht von Johansdorf (1180–1209) was a minnesinger who wrote five recruitment songs for the Third Crusade. (Runciman (1954), p. 490n).
- Caesarius of Heisterbach. Caesarius of Heisterbach (1180–1240) was a Cistercian prior who wrote Dialogus miraculorum, a collection of miracle stories, popular because of the many stories related by returning Crusaders. (Runciman (1952), p. 494)
- Annales Claustroneoburgenses. Annales Claustroneoburgenses is an anonymous history of Klosterneuburg Monastery covers 1075–1139, continued until 1455 by the Annales Mellicenses. (MGH Scriptores, IX, Runciman (1954), p. 494)
- Annales Admontenses. Annales Admontenses are the annals of Admont Abbey, covering the period from Adam to 1139. It was continued by Annales Garstense, covering 1181–1257 and by Annales Mellicenses, covering 1123-1564. Topics covering include the 1170 earthquake in Syria and Peter II Győr, a Hungarian bishop who participated in the Fifth Crusade. (MGH Scriptores IX)
- Annales Colonienses Maximi. Annales Colonienses Maximi, also known as Chronica regum Coloniensis (Royal Chronicles of Cologne), is a German chronicle covering the years 576-1202, including an account of the Second Crusade and Christian cities damaged in 1170 by an earthquake. Chronica also includes an account of the Children's Crusade of 1212. The work relies on Ekkehard of Aura for the period 1095-1106. (MGH Scriptores rerum Germ. XVIII, Runciman (1954), pp. 139–141)
- Annales Marbacenses. or the Marbach Annals, are from the Marbach Abbey covering the period from the 7th century until the 1240s. The earlier portion is derived from the Chronica sive Historia de duabus civitatibus of Otto of Freising and is combined with a later series of annals from Neuberg Abbey. (MGH Scriptores XVII, Runciman (1954), p. 495)

Norman and English works

- Gesta Normannorum Ducum (The Deeds of the Norman Dukes) was originally written by William of Jumièges (c. 1100 – after 1070) covering the period through 1066, and later extended by Orderic Vitalis and Robert of Torigni through the death of Henry I of England in 1135. (Runciman (1952), pp. 349n, 495)
- Robert of Torigni (c. 1110–1186), also referred to as Robert de Monte, was a Norman chronicler known for his Chronique de Robert de Torigni and for being the last contributor to Gesta Normannorum Ducum. His Chronique includes a description of the damage done by the 1170 Syrian earthquake and of the death of William II of Sicily. (Rolls Series, RHF Vol XVIII, Runciman (1954), pp. 9n, 497)
- Anglo-Saxon Chronicle is a collection of annals of English history from the birth of Christ until 1154, and includes material on English participation in the First Crusade, particularly that of Edgar Ætheling. (Rolls Series)
- Monitum in Subsequentia Carmina includes Songs of the Crusades and Songs of the Pilgrims written in 1188 by a member of the English royal court. They are found in Henry Savile's Rerum Anglicarum Scriptores post Bedam præcipui and later in the collection Poésies populaires latines antérieures au douzième siècle of Edelestand du Méril. (MPL 155 [Godefridum, Appendix II])
- Baldwin of Forde (c. 1125 – 1190) was Archbishop of Canterbury between 1185 and 1190 and accompanied Richard I of England on the Third Crusade. He left a large number of works including decretals concerning the church and English monarchy in the late 12th century.
- Joseph of Exeter (fl. 1180–1190) was an English poet who accompanied his uncle, Baldwin of Forde, archbishop of Canterbury, on the Third Crusade. His account Antiocheis is mostly lost, but sections praising the warriors of Britain. including King Arthur, survive. He also wrote Poemata in De Josepho Exioniensi vel Iscano, edited by Jean-Jules Jusserand. (Runciman (1951), pp. 332, 345)
- John of Salisbury (1115/1120–1180) was bishop of Chartres and historian who wrote Historia Pontificalis quae Supersunt covering the years 1148–1152 while he was employed by pope Eugene III. It is a description of Western Europe during and after the Second Crusade. (MPL 199, Runciman (1952), p. 494)
- Chronicles of Ricardus Anglicus. Ricardus Anglicus (1161–1242), also known as Richard de Morins, was an English canon lawyer who began the Chronicles of Ricardus Anglicus (Annales de Dunstoplia), the annals of Dunstable Priory, in 1210. The material in the annales prior to 1202 (when Ricardus became prior) is based on Ralph of Diceto's Abbreviationes chronicorum and Ymagines historiarum, and is extended to 1297 in Annales Monastici. (Runciman (1954), p. 494)
- Ordinacio de predications Crucis in Anglia. (Brevis) is a short handbook for preaching the Crusade, written in the early 13th century, for English audiences. Attributed to a Philippe of Oxford.
- Chronicle of Mailros (Chronicle of Melrose Abbey) is a history written by the monks of Melrose Abbey covering universal history from 745–1270. The material before the founding of the abbey in 1140 is based on the Anglo-Saxon Chronicle and the Chronica of Roger of Howden. The Chronicle includes the oldest known account of the sealing of Magna Carta and records the solar eclipse of 1 May 1185. (Runciman (1954), p. 495)
- Annals of Chester also known as the Annales cestrienses or Chronicle of the abbey of St. Werburg at Chester. It is the work of anonymous monks of the Benedictine abbey of St. Werburgh's, in Chester, and is a chronicle from the Incarnation to 1297.
- Bartholomew of Cotton (died 1321/1322) was a Benedictine monk from Cotton who was master of the cellar at the Friary of Norwich. He wrote his Historia Anglicana providing the history of Saxon and Norman kings through 1292. His work was extended by the Norwich Chronicle to 1298.
- Flores Historiarum ("Flowers of History") are a chronology associated with the Abbey of St. Albans covering the years from Creation until 1235, completed by English chronicler Roger of Wendover (died 1236) from a work begun by Roger of Howden. Continuations were later done by Matthew of Paris (mistakenly identified as Matthew of Westminster) and William Rishanger (died after 1307). The work completed by Thomas Walsingham (died 1422) is known as the St. Albans Chronicle. (Rolls Series, Runciman (1954), p. 155n, 496)
- John Capgrave. John Capgrave (1393–1464) was an English historian, hagiographer and theologian. His Chronicle of England is chronology of history from the time of Adam until 1416.

Other works referenced in histories.

- Secretum Secretorum. Secretum Secretorum is an encyclopedic treatise believed to have originated with a Greek source, translated at least by the 9th century. A Latin translation was done by Philip of Tripoli c. 1232. (EETS 276, Extra Series 66, 74)
- Roger Bacon. Roger Bacon (1219–1292) was an English philosopher who wrote Opus Majus at the request of pope Clement IV, covering a broad set of topics in natural science and philosophy. (Runciman (1954), pp. 340, 495)
- Guy of Warwick. Guy of Warwick was a legendary English hero whose exploits we the subject of romances popular beginning in the 13th century. He is reputed to have made a pilgrimage to the Holy Land, and is erroneously regarded as real in some 15th century chronicles. (EETS, Extra Series 25, 26)

Other works of interest include Annales Romani, Historia ducum Venetorum, and those by Geoffrey the Lombard. (MGH Scriptores V, Runciman (1952), p. 494, Runciman (1954), p. 495).

== Byzantine, Frankish Greek and Cypriot sources on the Crusades ==
The Byzantine Empire, subsequent Latin Empire of Constantinople, Frankish Greek states of the Frankokratia and the Kingdom of Cyprus offer a large number of sources on Crusades history, beginning with Alexios I Komnenos and his reign and continuing into the 14th century. Historiens grecs in RHC, edited by Carl B. Hase, includes translations of many of these documents as does Patrologia Graeco-Latina (MPG) and Corpus Scriptorum Historiae Byzantinae (CSHB).

=== The Alexiad of Anna Komnene ===
Anna Komnene (1083–1153) was a Byzantine princess and historian who wrote the seminal work The Alexiad in around 1148. The daughter of emperor Alexios I Komnenos, Anna's work covers the history of her father's reign and beyond, the years from 1081 to 1108. The work comprises 15 books and is categorized as:

- Attacks on Byzantium by Robert Guiscard and the crowning of Alexios I (1081–1087)
- Pecheneg invasions of Byzantium (1091)
- Relations with the Turks including the Seljuk Tzachas and the conspiracy of Nicephorus Diogenes (1087–1094)
- The First Crusade and aftermath (1094–1104)
- Attacks by Bohemond of Taranto (1104–1108)
- Final excursions and death of Alexios I (1108–1118).

After her father's death, she may have attempted to usurp her brother John II Komnenos and was exiled, though this is contested by historian Leonora Neville. She wrote The Alexiad during her confinement. (RHC Gr. Volume 1.II, MPG 131, CSHB 2-3, Runciman (1951), pp. 327–328, 347, Runciman (1952), p. 475)

=== Other Byzantine, Latin Empire and Frankish Greek sources ===
Other references relevant to the Crusades are historical documents relating to Byzantium, before and after the time of Alexios I, the Latin Empire and Frankish Greece.

Before the Komnenos era

- Chronicon Paschale is a 7th century Greek historical chronology of the world from the time of Adam until 627. The Chronicon includes an account of the Heraclian revolt against Byzantine emperor Phocas in 610. (MPG 92, CSHB 11-12, Runciman (1951), pp. 10n, 347)
- Antiochus Strategos was the author of La price de Jérusalem par les Peruses en 614 (Capture of Jerusalem by the Persians). The work, translated by Belgian historian Gérard Garitte, describes the 614 capture of Jerusalem by the Persian (Sasanian) empire. It also provides an account of the return of the True Cross to Jerusalem in 630 by emperor Heraclius. Conjectures that Antiochus Strategos is the same person as Antiochus of Palestine, author of the Pandektes, remain unproven. (CSCO 202, Runciman (1951), pp. 10n, 348, 350)
- Doctrina Jacobi nuper Baptizati. Doctrina Jacobi nuper Baptizati (Teaching of Jacob) is an anonymous text written in Palestine between 634-640. It provides one of the first Western views of Islam. It describes how Byzantine emperor Heraclius (c. 575 – 641) ordered the baptism of the Jews of Jerusalem after he learned of their aid to the Persians after his victory at the battle of Nineveh in 627. Doctrina Jacobi also provides an account of the role Jews played in the loss of Jerusalem to the Muslims in 638. It appears in Patrologia Orientalis as La didascalie de Jacob, première assemblée (Greek text) and as Le synaxaire arabe Jacobite (Ethopic text). (PO 3, 8, Runciman (1951), pp. 12n, 17n, 347)
- Passio Sanctorum Sexaginta Martyrum is an anonymous work that describes the first recorded instance of martyrdom of Christians by Muslims. During the 7th century Muslim conquest of the Holy Land, 60 Byzantine soldiers were executed in Gaza in 640 for their refusal to convert to Islam. The account of their martyrdom is in Analecta Bollandiana, edited by hagiographical scholar Hippolyte Delehaye (also editor of Bibliotheca Hagiographica Graeca). This account is combined with that of the martyrdom of Saint Florian in 304, and is also known as Passio LX Martyrum et Legenda Sancti Floriani. The incident is also related in Book of the Caliphs (Chronica minora II, ed. E. W. Brooks) by an author known only as Thomas the Priest. (CSCO Scriptores Syri 3-4, Runciman (1951), pp. 15n, 348, 350)
- Theophilos (died 842) was the last Byzantine emperor to support iconoclasm. In 836, patriarchs Christopher I of Alexandria, Job of Antioch and Basil of Jerusalem sent the Letter of the three Melkite patriarchs to Theophilos, defending the generation of icons. Theophilos subsequently had Basil jailed. (MPG 111, Runciman (1951), pp. 22, 347)
- Nikephoros I of Constantinople (c. 758 – 828) was Ecumenical Patriarch of Constantinople from 806-815. Nikephorus wrote several books in support of iconoclasm as well as the historical Opuscula Historica (Historia syntomos, breviarium) covering Byzantium from 602-769, including the battle of Yarmuk of 636 between the Byzantine empire and the Rashidun Caliphate. (Runciman (1951), pp. 17n, 347)
- Theophanes the Confessor (c. 758 – 818) was a Byzantine historian whose Chronographia covers the period 284-813. The work was continued to 961 by anonymous writers referred to as Scriptores post Theophanem. (MPG 108, Runciman (1951), pp. 3n, 10n, 348)
- Theodosius of Jerusalem, patriarch of Jerusalem from 864–879, wrote to Ignatios of Constantinople on the expectations of peace with the Muslims, sending monks to Europe to collect funds for Jerusalem. (Sa. Co., XVI, Runciman (1951), pp. 27n, 348)
- Constantine VII (905-959) was Byzantine emperor from 913–959 and author of four books including [[De Ceremoniis|De cerimoniis aulae Byzantinae]], describing the order of the Byzantine court. The document Three Treatises on Imperial Military Expeditions is an appendix. Included is a description of the capture of Aleppo by Nikephoros II Phokas in 962. (CSHB 16-18, Runciman (1951), pp. 32n, 347)
- Liutprand of Cremona (921–972) was an Italian historian whose works Antapodosis, seu rerum per Europam gestarum, covering 887–949, and Relatio de legatione Constantinopolitana ad Nicephorum Phocam covering 968–969, are an important source of Byzantine politics of the 10th century. (MGH Scriptores rer. Germ., XLI, MPL 136, Runciman (1951), pp. 88n, 346)
- Agapius of Hierapolis (died 942), also known as Agapius of Mabourg, was a Christian Arab historian who Kitab al-'Unwan (Universal Chronicle) provides a history of the world from Creation until ca. 780. His account of Byzantine emperor Heraclius' invasion of Syria in the 7th century was likely a source for both Michael the Syrian and Nicephorus Gregoras. (PO 5.IV, 7.IV, 8.III, Runciman (1951), pp. 17n, 348)
- Michael Attaliates (1022–1080) was a Byzantine public servant and historian who wrote The History, a political and military history of the empire from 1034–1079. The work naturally praises emperor Nikephoros III Botaneiates, but also shows an affinity towards the general Alexios I. It includes a short biography of Norman adventurer Roussel de Bailleul. He also prepared a number of policy documents including Ordinance for the Poor House and Monastery. (RHC Gr., Volume 1.1, CSHB 4, Runciman (1951), pp. 67n, 347)
- Michael Psellos (1017–1078) was a Byzantine polymath and historian who wrote his Chronographia covering the emperors of the 11th century through Michael VII Doukas. (RHC Gr., Volume 1.1)
- Georgius Cedrenus (fl. 12th century) was a Byzantine historian whose Synopsis Historiarum (A Concise History of the World) covers the world from Creation until 1057. The work draws heavily on that of Theophanes the Confessor and on the Synopsis of Histories of Greek historian John Skylitzes (d. after 1101). (MPG 121-122, CSHB 8-9, Runciman (1951), p. 347)
- Deux Inédits Byzantins. Deux Inédits Byzantins sur les Azymites ay début du XIIme Siècle includes two anonymous works concerning the schism of 1054 and the rivalry between the patriarchs of Jerusalem and Antioch. (Runciman (1951), pp. 97n, 342)

The period 1048-1204.

- Nicephorus Bryennius (1062–1137) was a Byzantine general and historian married to Anna Komnene. His major work Historia covers Byzantium from 1057 to 1081. This ranges from the victory of Isaac I Komnenos over Michael VI to the dethronement of Nikephoros III Botaneiates by his father-on-law Alexios I Komnenos. (MPG 127, CSHB 13, Runciman (1951), pp. 65n, 68-69, 347)
- Synopsis Chronicon is a chronicle covering Byzantine history from the time of Adam through of the rule of Alexios I, continuing until the recapturing of Constantinople in 1261. The work is highly derivative including sources from the Annals of George Akropolites. The author has been speculated to be Theodore Skoutariotes, an opinion that is not universally shared. Also known as Synopsis Sathas. (Runciman (1951), pp. 71n, 348)
- Theophylact of Ohrid (c. 1055 – after 1107) was archbishop of Bulgaria who wrote his Epistolae concerning current affairs with the Bulgarians and the impact of constant Byzantine wars. (MPG 123-126, Runciman (1951), pp. 103, 170n, 328, 348)
- Letter from Alexios I Komnenos. Emperor Alexios I Komnenos wrote a missive known as his Mousai to his son and successor John II Komnenos. (Runciman (1951), pp. 328, 344)
- Eustratius of Nicaea. Eustratius of Nicaea (c. 1050/1060 – c. 1120) was metropolitan bishop of Nicaea who wrote On the Holy Ghost that includes his speeches that highlighted his support of Alexios I and opposition to Peter Chrysolan. (Runciman (1952), pp. 137n, 495)
- Johannes Zonaras. Johannes Zonaras (fl. 12th century) was a Byzantine chronicler who served under Alexios I. His Epitome Historiarum (Extracts of History) covers Byzantium from Creation until the death of Alexios I in 1118. (CSHB 47-49, Runciman (1951), pp. 32n, 328, 348)
- John the Oxite. John the Oxite (died after 1100) was Greek Orthodox Patriarch of Antioch who exiled by Bohemond of Taranto in 1100. His treatises written while in exile were critical of Byzantium and in particular Alexios I. (Runciman (1951), pp. 321, 347)
- Theodore Prodromus. Theodore Prodromus (c. 1100 – before 1170) was a Byzantine writer and poet whose Poemata includes some historically significant information about Manuel I Komnenos. (RHC Gr. Volume 2, MPG, 133, Runciman (1952), pp. 475n, 496)
- Joannes Zonaras. Joannes Zonaras (fl. 12th century) was a Byzantine theologian and chronicler who wrote Epitome Historiarum (Extracts of History) covering Byzantium from Creation until the death of Alexios I in 1118. (Runciman (1951), p. 328)
- Michael Glykas. Michael Glykas (1130–1200, approximate) was Byzantine scholar who wrote a history of Byzantium from Creation until the death of Alexios I in 1118. He has been identified as Michael Sikidites. (MPG 158, CSHB 24, Runciman (1951), p. 328)
- John Kinnamos. John Kinnamos (Cinnamus) (1143 – after 1185) was a Byzantine historian whose Epitome Historiarum (Deeds of John and Manuel Comnenus) is an extension of The Alexiad covering the years 1118–1176. This includes the defeat of Manuel I Komnenos by the Seljuks of Rûm at the battle of Myriokephalon in 1176. (RHC Gr., Volume 1.II, MPG 133, CSHB 13, Runciman (1952), pp. 270n, 475, 495)
- Niketas Choniates (Nicetas) (1155–1217) was a Byzantine historian who wrote Nicetæ Choniatæ Historia (Niketas Choniates' History) covering the period 1118–1207. His account of the sack of Constantinople in 1204 is particularly well-regarded. (RHC Gr., Volume 1.II/III, CSHB 35, Runciman (1952), pp. 211n, 475, 496, Runciman (1954), pp. 14–15n, 481)
- Nicholas Mesarites (c. 1163 – after 1216) was a Byzantine churchman and writer who was an eyewitness to the sack of Constantinople in 1204. His account of the carnage is presented in his work Opera. He also wrote Die Palastrevolution des Johannes Komnenos, an account of the attempted coup of John Komnenos the Fat in 1200/1201. (Runciman (1954), pp. 126n, 498)
- George Acropolita (after 1217 – 1282) was a Greek historian whose Annals cover the period from the loss of Constantinople in 1204 until her recovery in 1281. It is regarded as an extension of Nicetæ Choniatæ Historia. (Runciman (1954), pp. 287n, 498)

After the Sack of Constantinople.

- Thomas the Archdeacon (c.1200 – 1268), also known as Thomas of Spalato (Split), was the greatest of medieval Croatian historians. His Historia Salonitana atque Spalatinorum pontificum (History of the Bishops of Salona and Split) covers Croatian history up to the 13th century. Thomas' work covers the siege of Esztergom in 1241 as part of the Mongol invasion of Europe. (Runciman (1954), pp. 147n, 496)
- George Akropolites (1217–1282) was a Byzantine historian whose Annals is a continuation of the Nicetæ Choniatæ Historia and covers the period from the loss of Constantinople in 1204 until its recovery by Michael VIII Palaiologos in 1261. (RHC Gr., Volume 1.V, Runciman (1954), pp. 481, 498)
- Germanus II of Constantinople (died 1240) was patriarch of Constantinople from 1222–1240. His account of the Greeks martyred at Kyrenia by the Ibelins in 1231 is recounted by the Narrative of the thirteen holy fathers burnt by the Latins, in Constantine Sathas' Medieval Library. (Runciman (1954), pp. 202n, 498)
- George Pachymeres (1242–1310) was a Byzantine historian whose history De Michaele et Andronico Palaeologis was a continuation of Akropolites' work for the years 1255–1308, including an account of the recapture of Constantinople in 1261. (CSHB 36-37, Runciman (1954), pp. 287n, 481, 498)
- The Chronicle of the Morea is a 14th-century history covering the Franks establishing Crusader states in Greece from 1202–1292 (later in some editions). The work includes a discussion of the civil organization of the Principality of Achaea.
- Henry of Valenciennes. Henry of Valenciennes was a chronicler of Henry of Flanders, Latin Emperor of Constantinople, from 1206–1216. His work is regarded as a continuation of that of Geoffrey of Villehardouin (see above).
- Benedetto I Zaccaria (c. 1235 – 1307) was a Genoese admiral who attempted to establish Tripoli as a Genoese colony over the objections of the ruling commune, with Lucia of Tripoli confirming the privileges of both, as discussed in his Mémoire. (Runciman (1954), pp. 404–407, 433, 498)
- ' John VI Kantakouzenos (c. 1292 –1383) was Byzantine emperor from 1347-1354 and wrote a four-volume Historia that includes an account of Godfrey of Bouillon's arrival in Constantinople in 1096. (CSHB 5-7, Runciman (1951), pp. 152n, 347)
- Nicephorus Gregoras (1295–1360) was a Byzantine theologian and historian who wrote his 37-volume Byzantine History covering the years 1204–1359. (RHC Gr., Volume 1.V, MPG 146)
- Laonikos Chalkokondyles (1430–1470) was a Byzantine Greek historian from Athens whose Proofs of Histories encompasses the last 150 years of the Byzantine empire, covering 1298–1463. (MPG 159, CSHB 10)
- Doukas (c. 1400 – 1470) was a chronicler of the last of the Byzantine emperors, Constantine XI Palaiologos, from 1449–1453. His Historia byzantina covers the decline and fall of the Byzantine empire. (CSHB 20)

=== Sources from the Kingdom of Cyprus ===
The Kingdom of Cyprus was founded in 1192 at the end of the Third Crusade and continued through the 15th century. Historical sources for the Crusades beyond those discussed above for the Later Crusades include the following.

- Neophytos of Cyprus. Neophytos of Cyprus (1134–1214) was a Cypriot monk who travelled to the Holy Land in 1158 and documented his experiences in De Calamitatibus Cypri. His work also describes the Cyprus earthquake of 1160 and the plight of the Cypriots under Richard I of England during the conquest of the island in 1191. (RHC Gr. Volume 1.V, Rolls Series, Runciman (1952), pp. 430n, 496, Runciman (1954), pp. 46n, 481n)
- Guillaume de Machaut. Guillaume de Machaut (1300–1377) was a French poet who wrote La Prise d'Alexandre, an account of the campaign of Peter I of Cyprus, titular king of Jerusalem, against Egypt during the Alexandrian Crusade. (Runciman (1954), pp. 448n, 496)
- Informatio ex parte Nunciorum Regis Cypri. Informatio ex parte Nunciorum Regis Cypri is a history of Cyprus through the 14th century including Henry II of Cyprus, the last crowned king of Jerusalem, and his plans to retake the Holy Land from the Mongols. It is included in Louis de Mas Latrie's Documents and Histoire de l'île de Chypre sous le règne des princes de la maison de Lusignan. (Runciman (1954), pp. 434, 494)
- Leontios Machairas. Leontios Machairas (1360/1380 – after 1432) was a Cypriot historian who wrote his Kronika (Chronicle) covering the history of Cyprus from the visit of Saint Helen in the late 3rd century until 1432. The English translation Recital Concerning the Sweet Land of Cyprus Entitled Chronicle was made by British archaeologist R. Dawkins. (Runciman (1954), pp. 86n, 481, 498)
- Francesco Amadi. Francesco Amadi (died after 1445) was an Italian chronicler whose Chroniques d'Amadi et de Stromboldi covers the Crusades from 1095 and a history of Cyprus through 1441. Chroniques d'Amadi includes narratives from a number of sources including Estoire d'Eracles, Annales de le Terre Sainte and Gestes des Chiprois, along with original material. The Chroniques de Stromboldi are a translation of Leontios Machairas' Kronika by Diomède Stromboldi. (Runciman (1954), p. 494)
- Floria Bustron. Floria Bustron (died before 1570) was a jurist and historian who wrote Historia overo commentarii de Cipro (Chronique de l'Ile de Chypre), an account of Cyprus through the 16th century, including the trials of the Knights Templar in Cyprus in 1311. (Runciman (1954), p. 495)
- Georgios Boustronios. Georgios Boustronios (George Bustron) (1439 – after 1502) was a Cypriot chronicler who wrote Diegesis Kronikas Kyprou (Narrative of the Chronicle of Cyprus) that extends Macharias' Chronicle until 1489 when Cyprus was ceded by queen Catherine Cornaro to the Republic of Venice. (Runciman (1954), pp. 202n, 481, 498).

== Arabic, Persian and other sources ==
The major historical works written in Arabic or Persian, by Moslem or Coptic Christian authors, include the foundational chronicles of ibn Qalanisi and ibn al-Athir for the First Crusade and after, as well as other chronicles, biographies, reference material, legal documents, travel accounts and literature. Modern historians including Aziz Suryal Atiya, Carole Hillenbrand, Francesco Gabrieli, Clifford E. Bosworth, Niall Christie and Farhad Daftary have produced numerous work that also provide extensive bibliographies of Arabic and Persian sources. This section also includes Mongolian-language sources.

=== The Damascus Chronicle of ibn Qalanisi ===
Ibn al-Qalanisi (1071–1160), a descendant of Banū Tamim, was a politician and historian in Damascus who wrote Dhail or Mudhayyal Ta'rikh Dimashq (Continuation of the Chronicle of Damascus) covering the period 1056–1160. During that time, Damascus was ruled by Seljuks, Burids and finally Zengids. It is regarded as a continuation of Hilal al-Sabi's History which ends in 1056. The major version available in translation was compiled and edited by H. A. R. Gibb and provides a yearly chronicle from 1096 to 1160. The rulers of Damascus during the chronicle include Duqaq, Toghtekin, his son Taj al-Mulk Buri and Nur ad-Din, son of Zengi. Accounts of the siege of Tyre in 1111–1112, the Assassins, and Crusader interactions with the Fatimids are noteworthy. Ibn al-Qalanisi was the first Arabic chronicler of the Crusades to have widespread usage of suffixed curses (e.g., may God curse them) to his mentions of the Franks (Runciman (1951), pp. 333–334, 349, Runciman (1952), pp. 9n, 11n)

=== Complete History by ibn al-Athir ===
Ali ibn al-Athir (1160–1233) was an Arab or Kurdish historian whose family settled in Mosul in 1181 during the rule of the Zengid emir Izz al-Din Mas'ud. He wrote his masterpiece Complete Work of History, also known as The Complete History, The Perfect or al-Kāmil fi'l-Ta'rīkh, beginning in 1231. His work is chronological, and includes the Creation, the pre-Islamic world of Arabs, Persians, Romans and Jews, the caliphate and successor dynasties, and the Crusades from 1096 to 1231. The work draws heavily on that of ibn al-Qalanisi. D. S. Richards, Emeritus Fellow of Arabic at Oxford, translated portions of ibn al-Athir as part of Ashgate Publishing's Crusade Texts in Translation. They are titled under the general descriptor The chronicle of Ibn al-Athīr for the crusading period from al-Kāmil fīʾl-taʾrīkh, and include the following three parts:

1. The Years 491–541/1097–1146. The Coming of the Franks and the Muslim Response (2005)
2. The Years 541–589/1146–1193. The Age of Nur al-Din and Saladin (2007)
3. The Years 589–629/1193–1231. The Ayyūbids after Saladin and the Mongol Menace (2008).

The volumes include extensive bibliographical information on manuscript source, primary sources, and translations. (RHC Or., Volumes 1, 2, Runciman (1951), pp. 334, 348, Runciman (1952), p. 481, Runciman (1954), p. 485)

=== Sources on the Caliphate before 1096 ===
Most modern histories of the Crusades include relevant background material on the Fatimid caliphate, the Abbasid caliphate and sultanates including the Seljuk and Ghaznavid dynasties. Major references are identified in Principal Sources for the History of the Near East, 600–1050. Christian texts can also be found in CSCO Scriptores Arabici.

- Al-Jahiz. Al-Jahiz (776 – 868/869) was an Arab writer whose Three Essays (Fi al-Radd Ala al-Nasarah, Fi Zamm Akhlaq al-Kuttab and Fi al-Qiyan) includes attacks on the Christians living in Basra under the Abbasid caliphate. (Runciman (1951), pp. 27n, 349)
- Al-Balādhuri. Al-Balādhuri (fl. 9th century) was one of the earliest Muslim historians who wrote his Kitāb Futūḥ al-Buldān (The Conquest of Nations) which provides an early history of the Caliphate. He traveled widely in Syria and Mesopotamia and provided an extensive geographic information on the area. (Runciman (1951), pp. 28n, 348)
- Sulaymān al-Tājir. Sulaymān al-Tājir (fl. 850) was a Persian merchant who wrote Ancient accounts of India and China with Arabic historian Abu Zayd Ḥasan ibn Yazīd Sīrāfī.
- Eurychius. Eurychius (876–940) was patriarch of Alexandria from 933–940. He wrote Nazm al-Jauhar (Chaplet of Pearls) or Eutychii Annales, a world chronicle from Adam until 938, written in Arabic. The Annales provides a history of Syria, Palestine, and Egypt from the time of Persian occupation in the 7th century through Islamic rule in the 10th century. (MPG 111, CSCO Scriptores Arabici 472, Runciman (1951), pp. 3n, 10n, 12n, 27n, 348)
- Yahyā of Antioch. Yahāy ibn Sa'id of Antioch (died 1066) was a Christian historian who wrote a continuation of Eurychius' Nazm al-Jauhar, extending the work from 938-1034. His writings deal with Byzantium and Egypt, and were in defense of Christianity, refuting Judaism and Islam. (PO 18.V, 23.III, 47)
- Al-Mas'ūdi. ʾAbū al-Hasan ʿAli ibn al-Husayn al-Masʿūdīi (896–956) was an Arab polymath, historian and geographer whose major work Murūj al-Dhahab wa-Ma'ādin al-Jawhar (The Meadows of Gold) provides insight into the early days of the Abbasid caliphate. He is recorded as one of the first Arab travelers to visit Europe, Byzantium and east Asia.
- Hilal al-Sabi'. Hilal bin al-Muhassin al-Sabi' (969–1056) was an Arabic civil servant historian who worked for Buyid emir of Iraq Samsam al-Dawla. His works include the Book of Viziers, concerning the court of Abbasid caliph al-Muqtadir, Rusum dar al-khilafa (Rules and Regulations) and Tarikh Hilal al-Sabi, a chronicle through 1003. His work appears in The Eclipse of the Abbasid Caliphate. (Runciman (1951), p. 342).
- Ibn al-Athir's Account of the Seljuks. The history of the Seljuks from ibn al-Athir's The Complete Work History was translated by D. S. Richards into The Annals of the Saljuq Turks: Selections from al-Kamil fi'l-Tarikh ibn al-Athir that covers the period from 1029–1097, including the Seljuk sultans from Chaghri and Tughril through Barkiyaruk. (RHC Or., Volume 1, Runciman (1951), p. 334).
- Abu'l Fadi Bayhaqi. Abu'l Fadl Bayhaqi (995–1077) was a Persian historian who was secretary to Ghaznavid sultan Mahmud of Ghazni. His history Tarikh-i Bayhaqi described the times of the sultan Mas'ud I of Ghazni (998–1040)
- Muhammad Aufi. Muhammad Aufi (1171–1242) was a Persian historian whose Jawami ul-Hikayat (Collections of Stories and Illustrations of Histories) is the standard account of Persian history, and in particular the Ghaznavids, from Creation until the fall of the Abbasid caliphate under al-Mustansir in 1242.

=== Other Arabic historical sources on the Crusades ===
Selected Arabic sources for the pre-Crusades and Crusades eras include the following.

- Al-Atharibi. al-Atharibi (c. 1067 – 1147) was an Aleppan physician and bureaucrat who wrote a now lost Sirat al-Ifranj (History of the Franks). Some fragments are preserved in Ibn al-Adim.
- Al-Azimi. Al-Azimi (1090 – after 1161) was an Aleppan chronicler of Syria, writing Al Muwassal 'ala al-Asl al-Mu'assal, a history of Syria, and Ta'rikh Halab (The History of Aleppo). His work influenced other historians such as ibn al-Athir and covered the Mirdasid rule of the city and the rise of the Seljuk Aksungur al-Hajib, father of Zengi. (Runciman (1951), p. 334, Runciman (1952), pp. 480, 496)
- Usama ibn Munqidh. Usama ibn Munqidh (1095–1188) was Syrian from the Banū Munqidh dynasty of Shaizar who served under Zengi, Nur ad-Din, Saladin as well as the Fatimids and Artuqids throughout his 50-year career. His most famous work was Kitab al-I'tibar (Book of Contemplation) written as a gift to Saladin in 1183, and includes numerous accounts of the Crusaders. The English translation by Philip K. Hitti is An Arab-Syrian Gentlemen in the Period of the Crusades: Memoirs of Usamah ibn-Munqidh. (Runciman (1952), pp. 11n, 227-228, 302n, 318-320, 338-366, passim, 480, 496)
- Ibn Asakir. Ibn Asakir al-Dimashqi al-Shafi`i al-Ash`ari (1105–1175) was an Islamic scholar and historian from Damascus. He was a prolific author, mostly of religious texts, and wrote his Tarikh Dimashiq (History of Damascus) under the patronage of Nur ad-Din who built the madrasa Dar al-Hadith in his name in 1170.
- Al-Isfahani. Imad ad-Din al-Isfahani (1125–1201) was a Persian historian who lived in Mosul and was in the service of Saladin. His major works were a chronicle al-Fath al-Qussīfī'l-Fath al-Qudsī (Eloquence on the Conquest of Jerusalem) covering the period from 1187–1189, and al-Barq al-Shāmī (The Syrian Lightning), an autobiography that extolls Saladin's military expeditions. The latter was used in The Book of Two Gardens of Abu Shama. (Runciman (1952), pp. 480, 496)
- Ibn al-Jawzi. Ibn al-Jawzi (1116–1201) was an Arab polymath and historian who is regarded as the most prolific Islamic writer of all time, serving four Abbasid caliphs beginning with al-Mustadi. Among his works is Al-Muntadham fi tarikh al-muluk wa-'l-umam (History of the caliph and the nation, in 10 volumes).
- Diya al-Din al-Maqdisi. Diya al-Din al-Maqdisi (1173–1245) was a Muslim scholar and historian who accompanied Saladin on his quests. He wrote of the life of Muslims under Frankish rule in his biographical dictionary, Karāmāt Mashā'ikh al-Ard al-Muqaddasa (The Cited Tales of the Wondrous Doings of the Shaykhs of the Holy Land). He was an early supporter of jihad against the Franks.
- Al-Juwaini. Sa'd al-Din ibn Hamawiya al-Juwaini (fl. 1240) was an Arab historian who wrote Mémoires de Sa'd al-Din, a history of the Ayyubid civil war in Syria from 1239-1243 and the reign of as-Salih Ayyub and his cousin al-Jawad in Damascus. Some material in Mémoires was used by Sibt ibn al-Jawzi. (Runciman (1954), pp. 210–211, 499)
- Sibt ibn al-Jawzi. Sibt ibn al-Jawzi (1185–1256) was an Islamic preacher and historian who wrote Mirat az-Zeman (Mirror of time in histories of the notables), a lengthy encyclopedic biographical history covering Moslem history through 1256, with the material on the 12th century mostly derivative of other authors. (RHC Or., Volume 3 [extracts], Runciman (1952), pp. 43n, 46n, 59n, 64n, 69n, 95n, 328n, 482, 496)
- Kamal al-Din. Kamal al-Din ibn al-Adim (1192–1262), also known as Kemal ad-Din or by his family name of Ibn al-Adim, was an Aleppan historian who wrote Bughyat al-ṭalab fī tārīkh Ḥalab (The Crème de la Crème of the History of Aleppo), a biographic study of the rulers of Aleppo through 1260. (RHC Or., Volume 3, Runciman (1951), pp. 334, 349, Runciman (1952), pp. 480, 496)
- Baha ad-Din ibn Shaddad. Baha ad-Din ibn Shaddad (Beha ed-Din) (1145–1234) was an Arab historian who counted Saladin as among his close friends. His biography of the sultan was al-Nawādir al-Sultaniyya wa'l-Maḥāsin al-Yūsufiyy (The Rare and Excellent History of Saladin) is regarded as seminal and also provides key insight into the Third Crusade. He also wrote an Islamic legal treatise The Refuge of Judges from the Ambiguity of Judgements as well as The Virtues of the Jihad. Much of the knowledge of Baha ad-Din comes from his biography in ibn Khallikan's work. (RHC Or., Volume 3, PPTS XIII, Runciman (1952), pp. 480, 496, Runciman (1954), pp. 16n, 26-28n)
- Būstān al-jāmi. Būstān al-jāmiʿ li-jamīʿ tawārīkh al-zamān (General Garden of all the Histories of the Ages) is a short chronicle of Syria from the 6th through 12th centuries by an anonymous Arab writer covering at least through 1186. Būstān was written in Aleppo in 1196-1197 and may share a lost source with ibn Abi Tayyi's Universal History. Topics covered include the battle of Azaz of 1125, the siege of Edessa of 1146, the captivity and death of Joscelin II of Edessa in 1159 and the captivities of Raymond III of Tripoli and Reynald of Châtillon by Nur ad-Din. (Runciman (1952), pp. 174n, 327n, 370n, 446n, 481, 496)
- Ibn Wasil. Jamāl al-Din Muhammad ibn Wasil (1208–1298) was a Syrian historian who wrote Mufarrij al-kurūb, a history of the Ayyubid dynasty through the rise of Baibars in 1260. Ibn Wasil dictated the work to his scribe Nūr al-Din 'Alī ibn 'Abd al-Rahīm who went on to write his own history. (Runciman (1954), pp. 485, 498)
- Ibn Abi'l-Dam. Ibn Abi'l-Dam (1187-1244) was Syrian jurist and historian who worked under al-Muzaffar II Mahmud, emir of Hama. His works (titles unknown) are derivative of either Būstān al-jāmi or a common source.
- Nūr al-Din 'Alī ibn 'Abd al-Rahīm. Nūr al-Din 'Alī ibn 'Abd al-Rahīm (died 1302) was a Syrian historian who served as principal secretary to al-Muzaffar III Mahmud, emir of Hama, and scribe to ibn Wasil. He wrote his own history Dhayl mufarrij al-kurūb fī akhbār banī Ayyūb covering the years 1261-1296, mostly on events near Hama. He also recorded Mamluk activities in Syrian through at least 1285.
- Ibn Abi Tayyi. Ibn Abi Tayyi (1180–1228) was an Aleppan historian whose Universal History is mostly lost. Excerpts of his material is included in other works including the Sīrat Ṣalāḥ al-Dīn used in The Book of Two Gardens of Abu Shama. (Runciman (1952), pp. 437n, 481–482)
- Abu Shama. Abū Shāma Shihāb al-Dīn al-Maqdisī (1203–1268) was a chronicler of 13th century Damascus thirteenth-century Damascus. He is best known for his histories Kitāb al-rawḍatayn fī akhbār al-dawlatayn al-Nūriyya wa-l-Ṣalāḥiyya (The Book of the Two Gardens, concerning affairs of the reigns of Nur ad-Din and Saladin) and al-Dhayl ʿalā l-rawḍatayn (Sequel to the Two Gardens). The Book of the Two Gardens consists mainly of transcripts from ibn Qalanisi, ibn al-Athir, Baha ad-Din Shaddad, al-Isfahani, ibn Abi Tayyi and the rasāʾil of al-Fadil. He also prepared a summary of ibn Asakir's Tarikh Dimashiq. (RHC Or., Volumes 4, 5, Runciman (1952), pp. 376n, 383–386, 481, 496, Runciman (1954), pp. 16n, 485)
- Ibn Khallikan. Ibn Khallikan (1211–1282) was an Arab Islamic scholar who wrote a biographical dictionary Wafayat al-ayan wa-anba al-zaman (Deaths of Eminent Men and the Sons of the Epoch) which documented the prominent people of the time, including Baha ad-Din ibn Shaddad. It was written between 1256–1274. (RHC Or., Volume 3, Runciman (1952), p. 482, Runciman (1954), pp. 486, 498)
- Ibn Taymiyyah. Ibn Taymiyyah (1263–1328) was an Arab polymath and prolific writer who was personally involved in the battle of Marj al-Saffar in 1303. He was a strong supporter of the use of jihad in dealing with the enemies of Islam. Among his many works is al-Jawāb al-Ṣaḥīḥ li-man baddala dīn al-Masīh (The correct reply to those who altered Christ's religion).
- Abu'l-Fida. Abu'l-Fida (Abu'l-Feda) (1273–1331) was a Kurdish politician, geographer and historian from Syria who had descended from Najm ad-Din Ayyub, father of Saladin. He wrote numerous works including Tarikh al-Mukhtasar fi Akhbar al-Bashar (Concise History of Humanity), a history called An Abridgment of the History at the Human Race, a continuation of ibn al-Athir's The Complete History, through 1329, and texts Taqwim al-Buldan (A Sketch of the Countries) and Kunash, concerning geography and medicine, respectively. (RHC Or., Volume 1, Runciman (1951), p. 348, Runciman (1954), p. 486)
- Ibn Muyessar. Ibn Muyessar, also known as Taj al-Din Abu 'Abdallah Muhammad or ibn Moyessar, (died 1278) was an Egyptian historian who wrote Textes Arabes et ètudes Islamiques concerning Fatimid, Ayyubid and Mamluk Egypt. The extract included in RHC includes historical material on caliphs al-Mu'izz li-Din Allah, al-Aziz Billah and al-Hakim bi-Amr Allah, viziers al-Afdal Shananshah and al-Ma'mum al-Bata'ihi, and Mamluk sultan Baibars. (RHC Or., Volume 3 [extracts], Runciman (1952), pp. 348n, 496)
- Al-Jazari. Al-Jazari Muhammad Ibrahim ibn Abu Bakr (fl. 1290–1299) was an Arab historian who wrote Chronique de Damas d'al-Jazari, Années 689-698 AH, an account of the Mamluk rule in Damascus from 1290-1299. The Chronique includes an account of the march of sultan al-Ashraf Khalil from Cairo to Damascus in 1291, where he left his harem, and on to the siege of Acre of 1291. (Runciman (1954), pp. 412n, 499)
- Anonymous Mamluk Chronicle. An anonymous work known as Contributions to the history of the Mamlūkensultane provides a history of the Mamluk Sultanate for the years 1291–1340. Known as the Zetterstéen Chronicle after Swedish orientalist Karl V. Zetterstéen. (Runciman (1952), pp. 53n, 496)
- Ibn at-Tiqtaqa. Ibn at-Tiqtaqa (fl. 1302) was the nickname of an Iraqi historian Jalāl-ad-Dīn who wrote the compendium of Islamic history Al-Fakhri (History of Musulman Dynasties). (Runciman (1952), p. 498)
- Ibn Khaldūn. Ibn Khaldūn (died 1406) was Arab historian whose work Kitāb al-ʻIbar includes three parts: al-Muqaddimah (Prolegomena) a universal history of empires; a world history of events up to 1337; and a historiography of works from Arabic Africa. (Runciman (1951), p. 348)
- Badr al-Din al-Ayni. Badr al-Din al-Ayni (1360–1453), known as al-Aini, was an Arab Islamic scholar who wrote his The Necklace of Pearls (Perles d'Historie) covering the Ayyubid and Mamluk sultanates from 1226, with most of the early work derived from previous histories. (RHC Or., Volume 2.1, Runciman (1954), pp. 185n, 486, 498)
- Abu'l-Mahāsin. Abu'l-Mahāsin Yūsuf (1411–1469) was a student of al-Makrizi who wrote a biography of Saladin referred to as Anecdotes and good habits of the life of the Sultan Youssof. His Nodjoum az-Zahireh is extracted in RHC and covers the years 1098–1157 although his chronology differs from the more accepted one of ibn al-Athir. Abu'l Mahāsin and ibn al-Athir both offer accounts of the expeditions of emperor Basil II to Syria in the late 10th century. (RHC Or., Volume 3, Runciman (1951), pp. 34n, 348, Runciman (1952), p. 496)
- Al-Makrizi. Al-Makrizi (1364–1442) was an Egyptian historian, also known as al-Maqrisi, descended from the Fatimids who wrote extensively on the caliphates and sultanates that ruled the country. Some of his material appears to be based on the works of ibn Muyessar and ibn Abd al-Zahir. (History of Egypt in ROL, Vol VIII-X, Runciman (1952), pp. 395n, 437n, 468n, 482, 496, Runciman (1954), pp. 161n, 486, 499)
- Other Arab Historians of the Crusades. These include ibn al-Azraq al-Fariqi, ibn Abd al-Zahir, al-Harawi, Ibn Zuraiq, al-Fadil, as-Shaibani, ibn ad-Dahhan, ibn at-Tawair and Ismail al-Jazari. (Runciman (1951), p. 334, Runciman (1954), pp. 485–486).

=== Coptic Christian sources ===
Sources of the Crusades by Coptic Christians written in Arabic include the following. Other works can be found in CSCO Scriptores Coptici and Bibliotheca Hagiographica Orientalis.

- John of Nikiû. John of Nikiû (fl. 680 – 690) was an Egyptian Coptic bishop who wrote his Chronicles covering from the time of Adam until the Moslem conquest of Egypt in 646. The Chronicles also provides an account of the chaotic rule of Byzantine emperor Phocas from 602-610. (Runciman (1951), pp. 10n, 21n, 350)
- Severus ibn al-Muqaffa. Severus ibn al-Muqaffa (died 987), also known as Severus of El Ashmunein, was a Coptic Orthodox bishop living in Egypt at the time of the overthrow of the Abbasid caliphate by the Fatimids. He was the initial author of Ta'rikh Batarikat al-Kanisah al-Misriyah (History of the Patriarchs of Alexandria). Translation by Eusèbe Renaudot (1646–1720) published in 1713. (PO 1.II, Runciman (1951), p. 349)
- Histoire des Patriarches d'Alexandrie. Histoire des Patriarches d'Alexandrie (History of the Patriarchs of Alexandria) is a historical work of the Coptic Orthodox Church of Alexandria written in Arabic. The work is a continuation of Ta'rikh Batarikat al-Kanisah al-Misriyah by Severus ibn al-Muqaffa. The Histoire presents biographies of the patriarchs from the 4th century until 1167, with later extensions into modern times. (ROL, Vol XI, PO 5.I, Runciman (1954), pp. 157n, 498)
- Ibn al-Amid. al-Makin ibn al-Amid (1205–1273) was a Coptic Christian historian from Egypt who wrote his al-Majmu` al-Mubarak (The blessed collection) in two parts. The first part is concerned with the world from the time of Adam until 586. The second traces Islamic history from Muhammad until the time of Baibars in 1260. The second half was published later under the titles Historia saracenica and L'Histoire mahometane. (Runciman (1954), pp. 485, 498) An excerpt on the Ayyubid period was published in French by Claude Cahen, having been translated by his students.
- Chronicon orientale. Chronicon orientale (al-Taʾrīkh al-sharqī) is a universal history written by an anonymous Coptic Christian between 1257–1260. The work covers the period from the Old Testament through Egypt and Syria up to 1260. Since the 17th century, this work has been misattributed to ibn al-Rāhib. (Runciman (1954), pp. 485–486)
- Ibn al-Rāhib. Abū Shākir ibn al-Rāhib (c. 1205 – c. 1295) was a Coptic polymath and encyclopedist who work Kitāb al-Tawārīkh (Book of Histories) covers the history of the world, Islam and the Coptic church, as well as astronomy. The last three chapters of Kitāb were written by an anonymous author and are known as the Chronicon oriental.

=== Persian sources ===
The Persian sources shown below are generally concerned with the Nizari Isma'ili State, established in Persian at Alamut Castle in 1092, the relations with neighboring Arab and Turkic empires such as the Seljuk sultanate of Rûm and Khwarazmians, and the Mongol conquest of Persia beginning in 1219.

- Chronicle of Se'ert. Chronicle of Se'ert, also known as Histoire nestorienne, is a Persian ecclesiastical history by an anonymous Nestorian writer covering roughly the period 251-650. (PO, 4.III, 5.II, 7.II, 13.IV, Runciman (1951), pp. 20n, 348)
- Elijah of Nisibis. Elijah of Nisibis (975–1046), also known as Elias of Nisibin, was a Nestorian cleric whose work Chronography provides a history of the Holy Land through 1018, including the Sasanian empire and the conquest of Jerusalem by the Muslims. (CSCO Scriptores Syri 21, 23, Runciman (1951), pp. 3n, 350)
- Miskawayh. Abu Ali Ahmad Miskawayh (932–1030) was a Persian historian who wrote The Experiences of the Nations and The Eclipse of the Abbasid Caliphate. Miskawayh presents an account of emperor Nikephoros II Phokas' and the Byzantine conquest of Cilicia in 964-965, defeating Sayf al-Dawla, Hamdanid emir of Aleppo. He also wrote the Tajárib al-Umam (Refinement of Character), a work on philosophical ethics, included in The Eclipse of the Abbasid Caliphate. (Runciman (1951), pp. 33n, 342, 349)
- Hassan-i Sabbah. Hassan-i Sabbah (1050–1124) was the Persian founder of the Assassins and first ruler of the Nizari Isma'ili State that operated throughout Persian and Syria. The Assassins' first victim was Seljuk vizier Nizam al-Mulk. Sabbah's autobiography Sarguzasht-e Sayyidnā (The Adventures of Our Lord) has not survived but was available to other scholars including Ata-Malik Juvayni and Rashid al-Din. The Assassins were viewed as advantageous to the Crusaders in the early 12th century, particularly Tancred, and detrimental to their Muslim foes. Later activities were not so beneficial, losing de facto King of Jerusalem, Conrad of Montferrat in 1192 and Philip of Montfort of Tyre in 1270 to Assassins. (Runciman (1952), pp. 119–120)
- Nizam al-Mulk. Nizam al-Mulk (1018–1092) was a Persian scholar and vizier to Seljuk sultans Alp Arslan and Malik-Shah I. He was the founder of the Nizamiyyas (higher education institutions) and author of the Siyasatnama (Book of Government) also known as the Siyar al-muluk (Lives of Kings), a guide to the administration of the Seljuk empire, written in the mirrors for princes genre. He was the first victim of Hassan-i Sabbath's Assassins. (Runciman (1952), p. 120)
- Ibn al-Malāḥimī. Ibn al-Malāḥimī (before 1090–1141) was a Khwarazmian Islamic scholar who authored a number of religious texts including al-Muʿtamad fī uūl ̣al-dīn (The Reliable Book on the Principles of Religion), al-Fāʾiq fī l-uūl (The Excellent Book on the Principles of Religion), Tuḥfat al-mutakallimīn fī l-radd ʿalā l-falāsifa (The Gift to the Theologians Concerning the Refutation of the Philosophers) and al-Tajrīd (The Abstract).
- Al-Shahrazuri. Al-Shahrazuri (fl. 1201–1211) was a Persian historian who wrote Nuzhat al arwâḥ wa rawḍat al-afrâḥ, a compilation of biographies of notable scholars of 13th-century Persia.
- Ata-Malik Juvayni. Ata-Malik Juvayni (1226–1283) was a Persian historian who wrote Tarīkh-i Jahān-gushā (History of the World Conqueror), an account of the Mongol Empire. The work describes the Ilkhanate as well as the Assassins of the Nizari Isma'ili State. After the Mongol destruction of the Nizaris, Juvayni had access to the archives of the sect, drawing from them for his history before destroying them. (Runciman (1954), p. 301)
- Abu Firas. Abu Firas Ibn Qadi Nasr ibn Jawshan (fl. 1324) wrote the only known Isma'ili biography of Assassin master Rashid ad-Din Sinan (c.1132-1193), the hagiographic work Noble Word of Rashid ad Din. The work was translated by Stanislas Guyard in Un grand maître des Assassins au temps du Saladin, and includes a description of the Assassins' attempts on Saladin's life in 1176. (Runciman (1952), pp. 410n, 496)
- Ibn Bibi. Ibn Bibi (died after 1285) was a Persian historian whose work el-Evâmirü'l-Alâiyye fi'l-umûri'l-Alâiyye (History of the Seldjuks) was written at the request of Ata-Malik Juvayni. The history covers the Seljuk sultanate of Rûm from the period 1192–1280 and was presented to then sultan Kaykhusraw III. (Runciman (1952), p. 483, Runciman (1954), pp. 295n, 487, 498)
- Rashid-al-Din. Rashid-al-Din Hamadani (1247–1318) was a Jewish-turned-Islamic physician and historian who was vizier to the Ilkhan Ghazan whose Jāmiʿ al-Tawārīkh (Compendium of Chronicles) is a history of the Mongols from the time of Adam until 1311. The books include History of the Mongols, regarding the Khanate conquests from Genghis Khan through that of Ghazan. They also include the History of the Franks through 1305, based on sources such as Italian explorer Isol the Pisan and the Chronicon pontificum et imperatorum of Martin of Opava. A third part on geography has been lost. (Runciman (1954), pp. 310n, 487, 499)
- Wassaf. Wassaf (1265–1328) was a Persian historian of the Ilkhanate. His history, Tajziyat al-amṣār wa-tazjiyat al-a'ṣār (The allocation of cities and the propulsion of epochs) is a continuation of Ata-Malik Juvayni's Tarīkh-i Jahān-gushā whose account of the rise of the Mongol Empire ended in 1257.
- Hamdallah Mustawfi. Hamdallah Mustawfi (1281-1349) was a Persian historian and geographer whose work Ḏayl-e Tāriḵ-e gozida is a compendium of world history from Creation until 1329 and is dedicated to the son of Rashid-al-Din Hamadani. His work on geography Nozhat al-qolub may be derived from Rashid-al-Din's lost work.
- De modo Sarracenos extirpandi. Guillaume Adam (died 1341) was a missionary and later archbishop of Soltaniyeh, Persia. He wrote De modo Sarracenos extirpandi (1316–1317) detailing his approach for the West to defeat the Byzantine empire and the Ilkhanids. He may also have written Directorium ad passagium faciendum, a Crusade proposed to Philip VI of France. (RHC Ar., Volume 2.IV, Runciman (1954), p. 494)
- Omar Khayyam. Omar Khayyam (1048–1131) was a Persian polymath who was the author of numerous mathematical, scientific and poetic works. Khayyam went to work in the service of Nizam al-Mulk, vizier to Malik-Shah I, in 1075 and later worked for Ahmad Sanjar in Merv. He is recognized in historical works by al-Isfahani and al-Shahrazuri. In his translation of the Rubaiyat of Omar Khayyam, poet Edward Fitzgerald claimed a friendship among Khayyam, Hassan-i Sabbah and Nizam al-Mulk which is most certainly false.
- Selçukname. Selçukname is a term used for a variety of chronicles concerning the history of the Seljuk empire, written primarily in Persian. Many are found in Textes realties à l'histoire des Seldjouqides, Paris (1902). The most prominent of these is el-Evâmirü'l-Alâiyye fi'l-umûri'l-Alâiyye by ibn Bibi.

=== Related Arabic-language works ===
Other historical, legal or literary works that have relevance to the Crusades include the following:

- Ali ibn Tahir al-Sulami. Ali ibn Tahir al-Sulami (1039–1106) was a Damascene historian who was among the first to preach jihad against the crusading Franks in his Kitāb al- Jihād (Book of Struggle or Jihad). He is among the first to use suffixed curses in describing the Franks.
- Ibn Tahir of Caesarea. Abū l'Fadl ibn al-Qaisaran (1056–1113), also known as ibn Tahir of Caesarea, was an Arab historian and poet who wrote verse extolling the virtues of Sunni Islam.
- Al-Abiwardi. Abu Muzaffar Muhammad al-Abiwardi (1064–1113) was an Arab poet and historian who was in the service of one of the sons of Nizam al-Mulk. His historical work was concerning Abbasid caliphs al-Muqtadi and al-Mustazhir. In 1104, he took charge of the Nizamiyya of Isfahan. He fell out of favor and was poisoned by Seljuk sultan Muhammad I Tapar. His book of poems Diwān containing scathing attacks on the Crusaders were reprinted by ibn al-Athir.
- Abu Bakr ibn al-Dawadari. Abu Bakr ibn al-Dawadari (fl. 1309–1336) was the son of a Mamluk military officer and historian who wrote Kanz al-Durar wa-Jami' al-Ghurar (The Treasure of Pearls and the Collector of the Best Parts) that includes an account of the battle of Ayn Jalut in 1260.
- Ibn al-Furat. Ibn al-Furat (1334–1405) was an Egyptian historian who wrote the universal history Taʾrīkh al-duwal wa 'l-mulūk (History of the Dynasties and Kingdoms). Only the portions after 1106 were completed. (Runciman (1954), pp. 486, 498)
- Al-Maqrizi. Al-Maqrizi (1364–1442) was an Egyptian historian who wrote extensively of the Fatimid, Ayyubid and Mamluk dynasties. His many works include Itti'āz al-Ḥunafā' bi-Akhbār al-A'immah al-Fāṭimīyīn al-Khulafā and History of the Ayyubit and Mameluke Rulers. (Runciman (1954), pp. 161n, 499)

=== Mongolian sources ===
The references cite only two original Mongolian-language sources for the Crusades, which are the French and German language translation of the same source. Available descriptions of both translations are presented below. Original Mongol sources and later references on the Mongols are found in the Select Bibliography of A History of the Crusades, pp. 553 and 653, respectively.

- Histoire Secrète des Mongols. Histoire Secrète des Mongols by Yuan Ch'ao Pi Shih is the oldest surviving literary work in Mongolian, describing the history of the Mongols from 1241. The work was discovered by Russian sinologist Palladius Kafarov and first translations by Erich Haenisch and later Paul Pelliot. (Runciman (1954), pp. 237n, 499)
- Die geheime Geschichte der Mongolen. Die geheime Geschichte der Mongolen aus einer mongoleischen Niederschrift des Jahres 1241 von der Insel Kode'e im Keluren-Fluss (The Secret History of the Mongols from a Mongolian record from 1241 from the island of Kode'e in the Keluren River) was translated by German sinologist Erich Haenisch. The Secret History of the Mongols is Mongolia's first literary work and tells the story of Genghis Khan's clan. It was written after his death in 1227 and presumably presented at the Mongolian Diet, the Kuriltai, which Ögedei Khan held in 1240. The author is unknown, but in all probability comes from the court of Ögedei. The author is possibly Schigichutuchu, Ögedei's adoptive brother. (cf. German Wikipedia, Die Geheime Geschichte der Mongolen).

Relevant Persian and Western sources on the Mongolian empire include Juvayni's Tarīkh-i Jahān-gushā, Pian del Carpine's Ystoria Mongalorum, Benedict of Poland's Hystoria Tartarorum and The Travels of Marco Polo, described elsewhere.

== Armenian, Syriac and Georgian sources ==
Historical sources from the Armenian Kingdom of Cilicia, including the Bagratuni dynasty, Christian historians writing in the Syriac language in the Levant, and the Kingdom of Georgia, under the Bagrationi dynasty, are described below.

=== The Chronicle of Matthew of Edessa ===
Matthew of Edessa (second half of 11th century–1144) was an Armenian historian from Edessa. His history Chronicle covers the first half of the 9th century through second half of the 12th. The work is in three parts. The first part covers the period 951–1051. The second covers 1051–1101, and the third covers up to 1129, with some material up to 1136 that may have been done by a collaborator. While the first two parts are a broader history of Byzantine and Caucusus affairs, the third part focuses exclusively on Edessa and its environs. Two parts of the Chronicle have received particular attention. The first is a letter from emperor John I Tzmiiskes to king Ashot III of Armenia in 975 and the second is a discourse from exiled king Gagik II of Armenia to Constantine X Doukas after 1045 on the divergence of the Greek and Armenian churches. The work was continued after his death, believed to be during the siege of Edessa, by Gregory the Priest. (RHC Ar., Volume 1, Runciman (1951), pp. 335–336, 349, Runciman (1952), p. 483)

=== Other Armenian sources ===
Other sources of Armenian history in addition to Matthew of Edessa include the following.

- Sebeos. Sebeos (fl. 7th century) was an Armenian bishop and historian. The work History of Heraclius has been attributed to him. The History chronicles Armenia from the end of the 5th century until 881. It includes the legend of Armenia's founding by the legendary Hayk, Sasanian Armenia, relations with Byzantine emperor Heraclius (ruled 610-641), and the Islamic conquest of Armenia in 661. (Runciman (1951), pp. 10n, 16n, 348)
- Aristaces of Lastivert. Aristaces of Lastivert (1002-1080) was an Armenian historian whose work History: About the Sufferings Visited Upon by Foreign Peoples Living Around Us discusses Armenian relations with Byzantium and Georgian, as well as the Seljuk invasions of the 11th century. (Runciman (1951), p. 349)
- Gregory the Priest. Gregory the Priest (fl. 1160s) was an Armenian priest from Kaysun who wrote Chronique de Grégoire le Prètre, a continuation of Mathew of Edessa's Chronicle, to cover Armenian history from 1136–1162. The Chronique incorporates Basil the Doctor's Oraison. (RHC Ar., Volume 1, Runciman (1952), pp. 348n, 354–357, 483, 496)
- Nerses Shnorhall. Nerses Shnorhall (1102–1173), also known as Nerses IV the Gracious, was Catholicos of Armenia from 1166–1173. His poem Voghb Yedesyo (Elégie sur la Prise d'Edessa, or Elegy on the taking of Edessa) has modest historical interest. Following the fall of Jerusalem, his successor Gregory IV Dgha wrote a similar poem Elégie sur la Prise de Jérusalem (Elegy on the taking of Jerusalem), again with limited historical significance. (RHC Ar., Volume 1, Runciman (1952), pp. 483, 496)
- Nerses of Lambron. Nerses of Lambron (1153–1198), nephew of Nerses Shnorhall, was archbishop of Tarsus and author of numerous works on ecclesiastical history. Those with particular historical relevance include his Mediation of the Institution of the Church and the Master of the Mass and Letter to Leo II, King of Armenia, both excerpted in RHC. (RHC Ar., Volume 1)
- Samuel of Ani. Samuel of Ani (fl. 12th century) also known as Samuel Anec'i (Anetsi) was an Armenian priest and historian from Ani whose Universal Chronicle (La Chronographie de Samuel d'Ani) covers Armenian history from the time of Adam until 1180. He was a student of Hovhannes Imastaser (1047–1129), an Armenian polymath whose biography may have been written by Kirakos of Gandzaketsi. (RHC Ar., Volume 1, Runciman (1951), pp. 335, 349, Runciman (1952), p. 483)
- Basil the Doctor. Basil the Doctor (fl. 1146), also known as Barsegh, was the Armenian chaplin of Baldwin of Marash. After Baldwin's death at the siege of Edessa of 1146, Basil wrote the eulogy entitled Oraison Funèbre de Baudouin for his patron. (RHC Ar., Volume 1, Runciman (1952), pp. 240n, 483, 496)
- Kirakos of Gandzaketsi. Kirakos Gandzaketsi (1200/1202–1271), also known as Cyriacus of Ganja, was an Armenian historian whose History of Armenia covers the period from the 3rd century to the 12th century. The work includes accounts of the subjugation of the Armenians by Turkic and Mongol invaders, in particular Abaqa Khan. He also wrote The Journey of Haithon, King of Little Armenia, To Mongolia and Back about the travels of Hethum I of Armenia to the Mongolian court and possibly a biography of Hovhannes Imastaser. (RHC Ar., Volume 1, Runciman (1951), pp. 335, 349, Runciman (1952), p. 483)
- Vardan Areweic'i. Vardan Areweic'i (1200‑1271) also known as Vartan the Great or Vardan of the East was an Armenian historian whose work History of the World covers the period from Creation until 1264 when he was sent by Hethum I of Armenia on a mission to Mongol ruler Hulagu Khan. (RHC Ar., Volume 1, Runciman (1951), pp. 335, 349, Runciman (1952), p. 483, Runciman (1954), p. 497)
- Vahram of Edessa. Vahram of Edessa (died after 1289), also known as Vahram Rabuni, was a monk who, as secretary to Leo II of Armenia, wrote his Chronique Rimée de la Petite Arménie (The Rhymed Chronicle of Armenia Minor) covering Armenian history from the time of Ashot I of Armenia (rule from 884–890) until the death of Leo II in 1289. His work discusses Constantine II, Ruben III, Thoros II, Leo I, and queen Isabella among others. (RHC Ar., Volume 1, Runciman (1951), p. 349, as History of the Rupenian Dynasty, Runciman (1952), pp. 182n, 201n, 484)
- Sempad the Constable. Sempad the Constable (1208–1276), also known as Smbat Sparapet, was an Armenian noble and brother of Hethum I. He wrote Chronique du Royaume de Petite Armenie (Chronicle of the Kingdom of Little Armenia) covering Armenian history through 1270. He also translated the Assizes of Antioch into French. (RHC Ar., Volume 1, Runciman (1951), p. 349, Runciman (1952), p. 483, Runciman (1954), p. 484)
- Continuation of Sempad's Chronique. The continuation and ending of Sempad the Constable's Chronique du Royaume de Petite Armenie was anonymously authored and covered the period from Sempad's death until th 1330s. (RHC Ar., Volume 1, [Appendix to Chronique], Runciman (1952), p. 483)
- Kirakos Gandzaketsi. Kirakos Gandzaketsi (c. 1200 – 1271) was an Armenian historian who wrote his History of Armenia (1265), a summary of events from the 4th to the 13th century.
- Mekhitar of Airavang. Mekhitar of Airavang (1230–1300), also known as Mxit'ar of Ayrivank', was an Armenian monk known for his work Chronological History covering through 1289. (Runciman (1951), pp. 335, 349)
- Chant Populaire. An anonymous popular song called Ballad on the captivity of Leo describes the captivity of Leo II of Armenia following the battle of Mari in 1266. (RHC Ar., Volume 1, Runciman (1954), p. 499)
- Historical Poem of Hethum II. Hethum II of Armenia (1266–1307) composed Poeme de Hethoum II, Roi d'Arménie, a short chronicle of Armenian Cilicia, published in 1308. The work was subsequently included in some Armenian Bibles. (RHC Ar., Volume 1, Runciman (1954), p. 323)
- Hayton of Corycus. Hayton of Corycus (1240–1310/1320), also known as Hethum of Gorigos, was an Armenian noble and historian whose La Flor des estoires de la terre d'Orient (Flower of the Histories of the East) concerns the Muslim conquests and Mongol invasion. (RHC Ar., Volume 1 [Table Chronologiques], RHC Ar., Volume 2.II, Runciman (1952), p. 487)
- Mekhithar de Daochir. Mekhithar de Daochir (fl. 1262), also known as Mxit'ar of Tašir, wrote an account called Relation of the Conference held with the Papal Legate, presumably about a meeting with Armenian Catholicos Constantine I of Cilicia in Acre in 1262. (RHC Ar., Volume 1)
- Directorium ad passagium faciendum. The Directorium ad passagium faciendum (Initiative for making the passage) is a Latin text written in 1332 attributed either to a Dominican priest named Burcard (Brocardus Monacus) or to Guillaume Adam. The objective of the work was to persuade Philip VI of France to embark on a Crusade to conquer Serbian-occupied Albania. (RHC Ar., Volume 2.III, Runciman (1954), p. 494)
- Mardiros de Crimée. Mardiros de Crimée (fl. 1375), the Martyr of Crimea, wrote Liste Rimée des Souverains de la Petite Arménie (Poem on the Kings of Little Armenia) about the Rubenid dynasty from Ruben I of Armenia (ruled 1080–1095) through Leo V of Armenia who ruled through 1375.
- Jean Dardel. Jean Dardel (fl. 1375–1383) was a French friar who was an advisor to Leo V of Armenia and wrote a chronicle of Armenian history called Chronique d'Arménie that covers the 14th century. (RHC Ar., Volume 2.I, Runciman (1954), p. 495)
- Minor sources. The include works in Documents arméniens of RHC by Gregory IV Dgha, entitled Elégie sur la Prise de Jérusalem, and works presented in CSCO Scriptores Armenaici. (RHC Ar., Volume 1, Runciman (1952), pp. 483, 496, 497)

=== Syriac sources ===
Several historic sources of the Crusades were written in the Syriac language by scholars belonging to the Syriac Orthodox Church and the Church of the East (cf. The Syriac Biographical Dictionary). The works of Sebastian Brock, the leading scholar on Syriac language sources, provide additional information.

- Early Syriac Chronicles. Early Syriac chronicles include the lost chronicle of patriarch Dionysius I Telmaharoyo (died 845); the anonymous Chronicle of 813, covering the years 754-813; and the Chronicle of 846. These works appear to be unrelated, but the Chronicle of 813 and the Chronicle of Michael the Syrian may have a common source for the period before 813.
- Basil bar Shumna. Basil bar Shumna (died 1169/1171) was metropolitan Bishop of Edessa in the Syriac Orthodox Church beginning in 1143 who wrote a (now lost) history of Edessa covering the period from 1118–1169/1171. His work was used in both the Chronicle of Michael the Syrian and the Chronicle of 1234. (Runciman (1951), pp. 335, 350, Runciman (1952), p. 484)
- The Chronicle of Michael the Syrian. Michael the Syrian (1126–1199), also known as Michael the Great, was patriarch of the Syriac Orthodox Church and author of his Chronicle in Syriac covering history of the world from Creation until 1195 and includes material from writings of Basil bar Shumna. (RHC Ar., Volume 1, Runciman (1951), pp. 3n, 335, Runciman (1952), p. 484)
- Chronicle of 1234. The Chronicle of 1234, also known as the Anonymous Syriac Chronicle, is a history of Syria and Armenia from Creation until 1234. The work includes material from writings of Basil bar Shumna. The author also provides a first-hand account of the loss of Jerusalem to Saladin in 1187, later joining the staff of the maphrian of the Syriac Orthodox Church, likely Gregorios Jacob. (RHC Ar., Volume 1, CSCO Scriptores Syri 354, Runciman (1951), p. 349, Runciman (1952), pp. 126n, et al., 483, 484, 497)
- Bar Hebraeus. Bar Hebraeus (1226–1286), also known as Gregory bar Ebroyo or by his Latin name Abulpharagius, was a scientist and historian who served as maphrian of the Syriac Orthodox Church at Mosul from 1264–1286. He wrote numerous works including Chronicon Syriacum and Chronicon Ecclesiasticum covering political/civil and ecclesiastical history from Creation until the later 1280s. (CSCO Scriptores Syri 692, Runciman (1951), p. 349, Runciman (1952), pp. 111n, 118n, 484, Runciman (1954), pp. 16n, 314n, 348n)

=== Georgian sources ===
The Kingdom of Georgia and the ruling Bagrationi dynasty played an important role in the history of the Crusades, primarily engaging with the Byzantine empire and dominant Muslim sultanates ruling in the area. Georgia had eight monasteries in Jerusalem in the 12th century and so an interest in the Holy Land, and fought regularly with the Artuqids and Seljuks. The major Georgian historical sources include the following.

- Sumbat Davitis Dze. Sumbat Davitis Dze (fl. 1030) was a Georgian historian who wrote The Life and Tale of the Bagratids, a history of the Bagrationi dynasty from Biblical king David through 1030.
- Ibn al-Azraq al-Fariqi. Ibn al-Azraq al-Fariqi (1116–1176) was a historian from Mayyafariqin who wrote Ta'rikh Mayyafariqin wa-Amid (The history of Mayyafariqin and Amid) a history that concentrates on the Artuqid dynasty, particularly Ilghazi and his victory over Roger of Salerno at the battle of Ager Sanguinis in 1119. The narrative then provides an account information on the Bagrationi dynasty from 1121–1163. This includes an account of the battle of Didgori in 1121 in which David IV of Georgia defeated the Muslim armies led by Ilghazi. Ibn al-Azraq served under the subsequent kings Demetrius I and George III. (Runciman (1952), p. 496)
- The Georgian Chronicles. The Georgian Chronicles are a compendium of medieval texts from the 9th through 14th centuries describing the history of the Kingdom of Georgia. The original works covered the period from Creation through 786. Later this was extended to the period 1008–1125, covering the Bagrationi dynasty from the rule of Bagrat III of Georgia through that of David IV of Georgia. The chronicles include The Life and Tale of the Bagratids, authored by Sumbat Davitis Dze, History of the King of Kings, Tamar, the life of Tamar of Georgia (died 1213), and Chronicle of a Hundred Years, covering the years 1212–1318. (Runciman (1952), p. 484, (Runciman (1952), pp. 160n, 431n, 497, Runciman (1954), p. 488)
- Studies in Medieval Georgian Historiography. The work Studies in Medieval Georgian Historiography by S. H. Rapp, Jr., is an examination of early Georgian texts and their Eurasian influences, and covers the early Bagrationi dynasty. (CSSO Subsidia 601)

== The Holy Land: pilgrimage, relics and geography ==
Much of the context of histories of the Crusades comes from accounts of pilgrims to the Holy Land, relics found by travelers and Crusaders, and descriptions of the geography of the area. The Travelogues of Palestine identify many of these accounts and Documenta Lipsanographica from Volume 5 of Historiens occidentaux provides a collection of accounts of Holy relics.

=== Accounts of travel to the Holy Land and the Far East ===
Pilgrims, missionaries and other travelers to the Holy Land have documented their experiences through accounts of travel and even guides of sites to visit. Many of these have been recognized by historians, for example the travels of ibn Jubayr and Marco Polo. Some of the more important travel accounts are listed here. Many of these are also of relevance to the study of historical geography (see below) and some can be found in the publications of the Palestine Pilgrims' Text Society (PPTS) and Corpus Scriptorum Eccesiasticorum Latinorum (CSEL), particularly CSEL 39, Itinerarium Hierosolymitana. Much of this information is from the seminal work of 19th century scholars including Edward Robinson, Titus Tobler and Reinhold Röhricht. (Runciman (1951), pp. 38–50)

The Pilgrims of Christ before the Crusades.

- Eusebius. Eusebius of Caesarea (before 265 – after 339) was a historian of Christianity who wrote Historia Ecclesiastica (Church History) where he identifies a Cappadocian bishop Alexander who visited the Holy Land in the 3rd century. His Life of Constantine includes a description of Saint Helen's pilgrimage to the Holy Land in 326–327 and are excerpted in The Churches of Constantine at Jerusalem. An earlier Christian scholar Origen (c. 184 – c. 253) wrote In Joannem (Commentary on John, Vol VI) about the desire of Christians to search after the footprints of Christ. (PPTS I.1, MPG 14, CSEL 6, Runciman (1951), pp. 38n, 39n, 347, 348)
- Itinerary of the Bordeaux Pilgrim. Itinerary from Bordeaux to Jerusalem (Itinerarium Burdigalense) is an anonymous account of a pilgrimage to the Holy Land in 333–334, with travels beginning shortly after that of Saint Helen. This is the oldest known Christian itinerarium. (PPTS I.2, Runciman (1951), pp. 39n, 345)
- Egeria. Egeria (fl. 380s), also known as Etheria or Aetheria, was a Spanish woman who in the early 380s wrote a work entitled Itinerarium Egeriae (Pilgrimage of Aetheria), detailing her pilgrimage to the Holy Land, once attributed to Saint Silvia of Aquitaine. (PPTS I.3, CSEL 39, Runciman (1951), pp. 39n, 343, 346)
- Saint Jerome. Saint Jerome (c. 347–420) was a Latin historian wrote of the early pilgrims to Jerusalem in his Epistotlae, De Viris Illustribus and Liber Paralipumenon. These began in the early 3rd century with a bishop of Caesarea named Fermilian. Jerome also wrote Pilgrimage of Holy Paula about his travels with Saint Paula of Rome (347–404) and her daughter Eustochium to the Holy Land, settling in Bethlehem. Their correspondence with Saint Marcella (325–410) has been published as Letter of Paula and Eustochium to Marcella. Many of the biographies of the early popes in Liber Pontificalis were authored by Jerome. (MPL 22, 23, PPTS I.4, I.5, Runciman (1951), pp. 38n, 39n, 345)
- Socrates of Constantinople. Socrates of Constantinople (c. 380 – after 439), also known as Socrates Scholasticus, was a historian whose Historia Ecclesiastica covers the church from 305-439, including the pilgrimage of Helena, mother of Constantine the Great, and her finding relics of the True Cross, including nails and the Titulus Crucis. (MPG 67, Runciman (1951), p. 39)
- Saint Eudocia. Saint Eudocia (c. 401 – 460) was Byzantine empress married to Theodosius II who went on a pilgrimage to Jerusalem in 438–439, returning with numerous holy relics. Her activities on her pilgrimage are recorded in Nicephoros Callistus' 14th century work Historia Ecclesiastica. (MPG 146, Runciman (1951), pp. 40, 348)
- Descriptions of the Holy Land in the 5th and 6th Centuries. Numerous works dating from 440–570 describe the geography, topography and buildings in the Holy Land. These include The Epitome of S. Eucherius (440); The Breviary of Jerusalem (530); Theodosius' De situ terrae sanctae, or Topography of the Holy Land (530); The Buildings of Justinian, by Procopius (500 – after 565); and The Holy Places Visited by Antoninus Martyr (c. 570), the so-called anonymous pilgrim of Piacenza. Both the Breviary and Antoninus Martyr describe the crown of thorns present in a "Basilica of Mount Zion." (PPTS II.1-II.4, CSEL 39)
- Symeon Stylites. The anonymous Vita Genovefae Virginis Parisiensis was a life of Saint Geneviève of Paris written c. 520. The work relates an incident where Saint Symeon Stylites (died 459) on his pillar in Aleppo, asked for news of Geneviève and sent her a letter. (MGH Scriptores rer. Merov., III, Runciman (1951), pp. 42n, 347)
- Arculf and Adomnán. Arculf (fl. late 7th century) was a Frankish bishop who toured the Holy Land c. 680. whose travels are documented in Pilgrimage of Arculfus in the Holy Land (about the year A.D. 670. Adomnán (c. 624–704) was a Scottish abbot who wrote his De locis sanctis (Concerning sacred places) based on the work of Arculf. The accounts contain the second oldest known map of Jerusalem (the oldest being the Madaba Map). (PPTS III.1, Runciman (1951), pp. 42n, 343)
- Saint Wlphlagio. De Sancto Wlphlagio, a priest in the Holy Land, wrote Commentatious historicus discussing 7th century pilgrims including Vulphy of Rue, also noted by Arculf, and Saint Bercaire (died 696). Bercaire (Bercharius), the founder of the abbey of Montier-en-Der, was accompanied by a Waimer, one of the murderers of Saint Leodegar, and he returned with valuable relics that he donated to Montier-en-Der and Châlons-sur-Marne. Three centuries later, abbot Adso of Montier-en-Der (died 992), hagiographer of Bercaire, embarked on a similar pilgrimage to Jerusalem accompanying a pentinent Hilduin II, Count of Arcis-sur-Aube, but died en route. (Aa. Ss. 22, Runciman (1951), pp. 43n, 345)
- Saint Willibald. Saint Willibald (c. 700 – c. 787) was an English bishop whose travels to Holy Land sometime between 720–740 are documented in the Hodoeporicon (itinerary) of Saint Willibald, dictated to an Anglo-Saxon nun named Huneberc. Willibald was the first known Englishman to travel to the Holy Land. His father Richard the Pilgrim attempted the trip but died en route. (PPTS III.2, Runciman (1951), pp. 43, 347)
- Commemoratorium de Casis Dei vel Monasteriis. Commemoratorium de Casis Dei vel Monasteriis is a report from 808 sent to Charlemagne tabulating all churches, monasteries and hospices in the Holy Land. Its purpose was to allow the emperor to expeditiously distribute alms. (Runciman (1951), pp. 43n, 344)
- Peregrinatio Frotmundi. Peregrinatio Frotmundi (De S. Fromundo seu Prodomundo Espisco) is the account of a Frankish nobleman named Fromond who traveled with his brothers to Jerusalem in the mid-9th century in order to expiate a crime. Fromond is the first known penitent to travel to the Holy Land for salvation. (Aa. Ss. 58, Runciman (1951), pp. 45n, 346)
- Bernard the Pilgrim. Bernard the Pilgrim (fl. 865) was a Frankish monk whose travels to the Holy Land are documented in the Itinerarium of Bernard the Wise. (PPTS III.4, Runciman (1951), pp. 43, 345)
- Ahmad ibn Rustah. Ahmad ibn Rustah (died after 903) was a Persian explorer and geographer who wrote a geographical compendium known as Kitāb al-A'lāq al-Nafīsa (Book of Precious Records), describing his travels to Europe, Russia and Arabia.
- Al-Maqdisi. Al-Maqdisi (c. 945 – 991) was an Arab geographer, also known as Mukaddasi, whose travels were documented in his Description of Syria (including Palestine) and Aḥsan al-taqāsīm fī maʿrifat al-aqālīm (The Best Divisions in the Knowledge of the Regions. (PPTS III.4, Runciman (1951), pp. 36n, 349)
- Fulk III of Anjou. Fulk III, Count of Anjou (Foulque Nerra) undertook four penitential pilgrimages to the Holy Land between 1003 and 1038, as documented in Gesta Consulum Andegavorum. This is described in Volume 1, Appendix 3 of Histoire des Croisades of Joseph Fr. Michaud.
- Lietbertus. Lietbertus (1010–1076) was a bishop of Cambrai who attempted a pilgrimage to Jerusalem in 1054, only reaching as far as Cyprus. This is described in Raoul of Saint-Sépulcre's Vita Lietberti (cf. Luc d'Archery, Spicilegium, IX). According to Miracula Sancti Wolframni Senonensis, Lietbertus met pilgrims who had been turned away from Jerusalem. It is reported that the Muslims also ejected some 300 pilgrims from the city in 1056. (Aa. Sa. OSB, III.ii, Runciman (1951), pp. 49n, 346)
- Nasir Khusraw. Nasir Khusraw (1004–1088), also known as Nasir-i-Khusrau, was a Persian writer whose travels throughout the Islamic world are described in his Safarnāma (Book of Travels). (PPTS IV.1, Runciman (1951), pp. 37n, 349)
- Miscellaneous Pilgrimage Accounts. A number of modestly obscure accounts of travel to the Holy Land covering the 11th through 15th centuries have also been published. These include: Anonymous pilgrims, I-VIII (11th and 12th centuries); La Citez de Jherusalem (The City of Jerusalem) (1187) used as a source for the Rothelin Continuation; and Ernoul's account of Palestine (1231); The Guide Book to Palestine by Philipus Brusserius Savonenis (1350); and Description of the Holy Land by John Poloner (1421), which includes a discussion on Egypt. (PPTS VI.1–VI.4)

During the Crusader era.

- Sæwulf. Sæwulf was an English pilgrim who travelled to the Holy Land from 1102–1103. His experiences were documented in the work Pilgrimage of Sæwulf to Jerusalem and the Holy Land. (PPTS IV.2, Runciman (1952), pp. 5n, 87n, 480, 495)
- Daniel the Pilgrim. Daniel the Pilgrim (fl. c. 1107), also known as Daniel the Higumenos (abbot), was an eastern Christian who travelled from Kievan Rus' to the Holy Land. He documented his travels in his Puteshestive igumena Daniil (Life and Pilgrimage of Daniel, Higumenos from the Land of the Rus'). (PPTS IV.3, Runciman (1952), pp. 321, 322n, 497)
- Peter Chrysolan. Peter Chrysolan (died after 1113), also known as Grosolanus, was archbishop of Milan from 1102-1112. Peter went on a pilgrimage to the Holy Land in 1111, and his arguments with Eustratius of Nicaea while in Constantinople are recorded in his De Sancto Spiritu. (MPL 162, MPG 127, Runciman (1952), pp. 137n, 495)
- Fretellus. Rorgo Fretellus (fl. 1119–1154) was a Frankish priest in the Kingdom of Jerusalem whose Descriptio de locis sanctis (Description of Jerusalem and the Holy Land) was a widely distributed account the city and its environs. The work, begun as early as 1128, was likely derivative of other works in the library of the cathedral of Nazareth. (PPTS V.1, as Fetellus)
- John of Würzburg. John of Würzburg (fl. 1160s) was a German priest who traveled to the Holy Land in the 1160s. His work Descriptio terrae sanctae (Description of the Holy Land) may have been written as late as 1200. His objective was to update the 7th-century De locis sanctis. (PPTS V.2, Runciman (1952), pp. 480, 494)
- John Phocas. John Phocas (fl. 12th cent) was a Byzantine traveler to the Holy Land who wrote of his exploits in Ekphrasis of the Holy Places (Concise Description). (RHC Gr. Volume 1.V, PPTS V.3, Runciman (1952), pp. 321, 392n, 475, 495)
- Libellus de Locis Sanctis. Libellus de Locis Sanctis (Little Book of the Holy Places) is a 12th century travelogue for use by pilgrims on their travels to the Holy Land written by an unknown monk named Theoderich who travelled to Palestine around 1172. (PPTS V.4)
- Benjamin of Tudela. Benjamin of Tudela (1130–1173) was a Jewish Spaniard whose travels in 1166–1172 through Europe, Asia and Africa were documented in work The Travels of Benjamin. His account included descriptions of Jewish colonies in Syria of the time. (Runciman (1952), pp. 296n, 484, 496)
- Euphrosyne of Polotsk. Euphrosyne of Polotsk (before 1104 – 1173) was a Belarus princess, the granddaughter of Vseslav the Sorcerer, whose pilgrimage to Jerusalem c. 1173 is described in Pèlerinage en Palestine de l'Abbesse Euphrosyne, Princesse de Polotsk. She was received by Amalric I of Jerusalem and died in Jerusalem in 1173. Her body was placed in the Monastery of the Caves in Kiev after the conquest of Jerusalem in 1187. (ROL, Vol III Aa. Ss. 9, Runciman (1952), pp. 322n, 497)
- Later Jewish Travelers. Numerous Jewish travelers went from Europe to the Holy Land in the 12th century and later. These include Samuel ben Sampson (fl. 1210) and Petachiah of Regensburg (died c. 1225). Their accounts have been documented by the 19th century French scholar Eliakim Carmoly in his Itinéraires de la Terre Sainte (1847) and translation of Sibbub Rab Petachyah (Travels of Rabbi Petachia of Ratisbon, 1831)
- Ibn Jubayr. Ibn Jubayr (1145–1217) was an Arab geographer and traveler who documented his experiences in al-Rihlah (The Voyage) which includes his trip to Mecca from 1183–1185 and included travel to Egypt and Sicily. (RHC Or., Volume 3, Runciman (1952), pp. 481, 496)
- Hakon Paulsson. Haakon Paulsson (died c. 1123) was a Norwegian Jarl who traveled to Jerusalem in 1120 and whose account is presented in the Orkneyinga saga written by an unknown Icelandic author.
- Peter Diaconus. Peter Diaconus (1107 – c. 1140), also known as Peter the Deacon, was librarian at the monastery of Monte Cassino and, while having never traveled to the Holy Land, wrote the travelogue Liber de Locis sancti based on the accounts of pilgrims to Jerusalem. (MGH Scriptores, VII, CSEL 39, Runciman (1952), pp. 211n, 495)
- Nikulas of Munkethverâ. Nikulas of Munkethverâ (died 1169), an Icelandic abbot, visited Jerusalem from 1149–1153 and documented his travels in Leiðarvisir og borgarskipan. The account is essentially a travel guide to Europe and the Holy Land for pilgrims.
- Henry the Lion. Henry the Lion (1129/1130 – 1195) was Duke of Saxony who went on a pilgrimage to the Holy Land in 1172 where he met Kilij Arslan II, the Seljuk sultan of Rûm. His journey was chronicled in Arnold of Lübeck's Chronica Slavorum. (MGH Scriptores, XIV, Runciman (1952), p. 393n, Runciman (1954), pp. 10, 74)
- Al-Harawi. Ali ibn Abi Bakr al-Harawi (died 1215) was a Persian Sufi ascetic traveler who wrote al-Tadhkira al-Harawiya fi al-hiyal al-harabiya (Admonition regarding war stratagems) for al-Zahir Ghazi, sultan of Aleppo, and Kitab al-ishara ila ma`rifat al-ziyara, a guide to pilgrimage sites.
- Anthony of Novgorod. Anthony of Novgorod (1190–1232), archbishop of Novgorod, documented his travels to Constantinople in his Description des Lieux-Saints de Constantinople (1200). Part of Itinéraires Russes en Orient, Société de l'Orient Latin, Série géographique.
- Wilbrand of Oldenburg. Wilbrand of Oldenburg (before 1180 – 1233) was a German bishop who served as ambassador to the Kingdom of Jerusalem in 1212. The account of his travel is presented in Itinerarium terrae sanctae (Journey to the Holy Land, Reise nach Palaestina und Kleinasien in German). His description of the Palace of the Ibelins in Beirut is renown. (Runciman (1954), pp. 381–382, 497)
- Giovanni da Pian del Carpine. Giovanni da Pian del Carpine (c. 1185 – 1252), also known as John Pianô del Carpine, was a Franciscan missionary who was one of the first explorers to reach the Mongol empire. His travels from 1245–1247 were documented in his Ystoria Mongalorum, also referred to as Historia Mongalorum quos nos Tartaros appelamus (History of Mongols and Tartars). Pian del Carpine was accompanied on his journey by Stephen of Bohemia and Benedict of Poland who wrote the short chronicle De itinere Fratrum Minorum ad Tartaros (On the Journey of the Franciscan Friars to the Tatars) and the longer Hystoria Tartarorum (History of the Tartars, or Tartar Relation). Some of the material in The Travels of Sir John Mandeville (c. 1371) is believed to have derived from del Carpine's work. (Runciman (1954), pp. 485, 497)
- William of Rubruck. William of Rubruck (fl. 1253 – 1255) was a Flemish Franciscan missionary who accompanied Louis IX of France on the Seventh Crusade and, in 1253, set out on a journey to Mongol territory. His report of his travels called Itinerarium fratris Willielmi de Rubruquis de ordine fratrum Minorum, Galli, Anno gratiae 1253 ad partes Orientales was presented to Louis IX in 1255. (Runciman (1954), pp. 280, 485, 498)
- Marco Polo. Marco Polo (1254–1324) was an Italian explorer who traveled in Asia from Persia to China in 1271–1295. He documented his exploits in The Travels of Marco Polo. In particular, he wrote of the Assassins at Alamut Castle.
- Rabban Bar Sauma. Rabban Bar Sauma (1220–1289) was a Turkic monk who travelled from Mongol-controlled China to Jerusalem from 1287–1288 and recorded his activities in The Monks of Kublai Khan, Emperor of China, translated by E. A. W. Budge. He also wrote a biography of his traveling companion Nestorian Yahballaha III. (ROL, Vol II, III, Runciman (1954), pp. 487, 499)
- Burchard of Mount Sion. Burchard of Mount Sion (fl. 1283) was a German friar who took a pilgrimage to the Holy Land from 1274-1284 and documented his travels in Descriptio Terrae Sanctae (Description of the Holy Land), one of the last detailed accounts prior to 1291. Burchard traveled to Cyprus and was received by Henry II of Jerusalem and later prepared a plan for an eventual crusade to retake Jerusalem. (PPTS XII.1, Runciman (1952), p. 494)
- Kirakos Gandzaketsi. Kirakos Gandzaketsi (c. 1200 – 1271), was an Armenian historian who wrote The Journey of Haithon, King of Little Armenia, To Mongolia and Back (after 1254), an account of the travels of Hethum I of Armenia to the East.

After the Fall of Acre.

- Riccoldo da Monte di Croce. Riccoldo da Monte di Croce (c. 1243 – 1320) was an Italian Dominican friar, travel writer, missionary, and Christian apologist. He is most famous for his polemical works on Medieval Islam and the account of his missionary travels to Baghdad. His Book of Travels written 1288–1291 was a guidebook for missionaries, and is a description of the Oriental countries he visited. His Letters on the Fall of Acre are five letters in the form of lamentations over the fall of Acre, written about 1292.
- Ibn Battūta. Ibn Battūta (1304–1369) was a Moroccan scholar who wrote of his adventures in his Voyages, visiting the Holy Land and Persia. His trip to Antioch verified that the city's fortifications had been destroyed in the siege of Antioch in 1268, but the city still had considerable population. Later, Burgundian pilgrim Bertrandon de la Broquière (1400–1459) described in his Voyage d'Outremer a visit to Antioch where the population ad been reduced to about 300. (Runciman (1954), pp. 327n, 496, 498)
- Ludolf von Sudheim. Ludolf von Sudheim (fl. 1340), also known as Ludolf of Suchem, travelled to the Holy Land from 1336–1341, writing De Terra sancta et itinere Iherosolomitano et de statu eius et aliis mirabilibus, que in mari conspiciuntur, videlicet mediterraneo (Description of the Holy Land, and of the Way Thither) documenting the fall of the Crusader states. (PPTS XII.3, Runciman (1954), pp. 485, 496)
- Later Franciscan Pilgrims. Noted Franciscan pilgrims to the Holy Land in the 14th century include: Niccolò da Poggibonsi (1345–1350), who documented his travels in Libro d'oltramare (Book of Outremer); Francesco Suriano (1480–1481), who wrote Tratatello delle indulgentie de Terra Sancta; and Florentine goldsmith Marco di Bartolomeo Rustici (1441–1442) whose travels are documented as Dimostrazione dell'andata o viaggio al Santo Sepolcro e al Monte Sinai.
- Felix Fabri. Felix Fabri (1441–1502) was a Swiss Dominican theologian who travelled to the Holy Land and recorded his experiences in Evagatorium in Terrae Sanctae, Arabiae et Egypti peregrinationem (Book of the Wanderings). (PPTS VII-X, Runciman (1954), pp. 485, 495)

Related works include the Baha ad-Din ibn Shaddad's biography of Saladin (PPTS, Vol XIII), Historia Orientalis of Jacques de Vitry (PPTS, Vol XI.2), De Calamitatibus Cypri of Neophytos, Annales Altahenses, covering the German pilgrimage to Jerusalem, and Chronica Slavorum by Arnold of Lübeck. The sources of Historical Geography below are also relevant, as are the following. (Runciman (1952), pp. 390n, 449n, 493)

- Early Christian writers. A number of pre-Christian Greek and early Christian writers are noted in the historical study of the Holy Land. These authors/writings include: "Aristeas" (2nd century BC), Hecataeus of Abdera, (4th century BC), Origen of Alexander's Contra Celsum (c. 184 – c. 253), Life of St. Saba by Cyril of Scythopolis (439–532), Cyril of Jerusalem (c. 313 – 386), Lucius Cassius Dio (c. 155 – c. 235), Sophronius of Jerusalem (c. 560 – 638), Chronicon Paschale (7th century), Theophanes the Confessor (758/760 – 817/818), and Eutychii annales (c. 938). (PPTS XI.1)
- Saint Augustine of Hippo. The views of Saint Augustine of Hippo (354–430) on the irrelevance of pilgrimages expressed in his Epistolae and Contra Faustum were not shared by St. Jerome, whose views prevailed. Augustine's De civitate Dei allowed for the possibility of God's war. (MPL 33, 51, 52, CSEL 25, 34, 40, Runciman (1951), pp. 40n, 84n, 344)
- Early Eastern Bishops. Saint Gregory of Nyssa (died c. 395), bishop of Nyssa, wrote disapprovingly of pilgrimages in his Epistolae, as did John Chrysostom (died 407), archbishop of Constantinople, in his Opera Omnia. John later expressed regrets about pilgrimage in Homilies on Ephesians. (MPG 44-46, 47-64, Runciman (1951), pp. 40n, 347)

=== Sources on relics ===
The study of the relics of Christianity is closely tied to pilgrimages as well as to the Crusades where relics were obtained either from the Holy Land or by theft from Constantinople. By the 3rd century, pilgrimages to the Holy Land had begun and the search for relics started in the 4th century by Saint Helena. Additional information on the translation of relics of the saints can be found in Bibliotheca Hagiographica Latina. Islam also recognizes relics dating from the time Abraham through that of Muhammad, known as the Sacred Trust, some of which are also relevant to Christianity.

- True Cross. The True Cross is first mentioned in the pilgrimage of Saint Helena from 326-328, as described in Socrates Scholasticus' Historia Ecclesiastica, and later in Egeria's Itinerarium Egeriae. Held in Jerusalem, it was lost to the Sassanids in 614, and returned by Heraclius in 630. With the loss of Jerusalem to the Fatimids in 1109, the relic was hidden by local Christians. The Cross' recovery by the Crusaders in 1099 is described in the works of Raymond of Aguilers, Fulcher of Chartres and William of Tyre. It was again in 1187, this time to Saladin who also viewed it as important to Islam. In 1219, it was offered to the Knights Templar in exchange for the lifting of the siege of Damietta, but never delivered. Most relics known today came from Constantinople after 1204, including two large pieces purloined by Robert de Clari. (Runciman (1951), pp. 294–295, Runciman (1954), pp. 53, 59, 68, 169–170)
- Seamless Robe of Jesus. The seamless robe of Jesus was also alleged to have been claimed by Saint Helena. The biography of St. Agritius, bishop of Trier, written before 1072, describes the relic being sent by Helena to Trier.
- Search for relics in the 4th Century. Authorities such as poet Prudentius (348 – after 405), author of Liber Peristephanon (Crowns of Martyrdom) and Carmina, and Magnus Felix Ennodius, bishop of Pavia (473/474 – 521) author of Libellum pro Synodo, taught that they Christian saints and martyrs could perform miracles and encouraged the search for holy relics. This view was continued by Saint Ambrose (c. 340 – 397), archbishop of Milan, whose Epistolae (Letter XXII) was an inspiration to acquire relics from the Holy Land; by Saint Basil (330–378) in a letter to Saint Ambrose; and by Victricius, bishop of Rouen (c. 330 – c. 407), in his Liber de Laude Sanctorum (On the Praise of the Saints). (MPL 16, 20, MPG 32, CSCO LXI, CSEL 6, 16, 56, Runciman (1951), pp. 40, 41n, 344-346)
- Holy Lance. The Holy Lance is a legendary relic with competing claims of legitimacy. It was reported by Antoninus Martyr in his pilgrimage to Jerusalem in 570, as well as other sources. Peter Bartholomew made claims to the discovery of the lance during the siege of Antioch in 1098, as reported in Gesta Francorum and by Raymond of Aguilers. Those claims were disputed by Adhemar of Le Puy. An account of the recovery of point of the Holy Lance by Byzantine emperor Heraclius is found in the Chronicon Paschale (7th century). (PPTS XI.1, Runciman (1951), pp. 241–243)
- Holy Chalice. Relics associated with the Holy Chalice (Holy Grail) are first seen by Arculf in his Pilgrimage, mentioning a chalice used in the Last Supper in a chapel near Jerusalem. Two actual relics are known. Sacro Cationno is a hexagonal dish returned to Italy by Genoese Crusaders in 1101, as described by William of Tyre and in the 13th century work the Golden Legend. The Chalice of Valencia was first identified in 1134 and is of unknown origin, although a theory is that it accompanied Saint Peter in his journey to Rome. (Runciman (1952), p. 74n)
- Documenta Lipsanographica. Documenta Lipsanographica ad I. bellum sacrum spectantia (Relics of the Holy Land) is a collection of eleven accounts of relics of the Holy Land written from 1098–1125. Included are discussions of the translation of relics of Christ and the Virgin Mary, John the Baptist, Saints George, Nicholas, Basil and Stephen, the patriarchs at Hebron, among others. (RHC Oc., Volume 5.VII)
- Relics of John the Baptist. The relics of John the Baptist are discussed in Legenda translationis beatissimi Johannis Baptistæ Genuam (1098), edited by Jacobus de Voragine, and Nicolai de Porta, Historia translations reliquiarum beatissimi Johannes Baptistæ Genuam (compiled 1405). (RHC Oc., Volume 5.VII.i, VII.ii)
- Relic of Saint George. Saint George (died 303) was the patron saint of the First Crusade, and his relic was given to Robert II of Flanders who returned to Europe in 1098. The account of the sacred relic of Saint George is provided in the anonymous Narratio quo modo relliquiæ martyris Georgii ad nos Aquicinenses pervenerunt (1100) (RHC Oc., Volume 5.VII.iii)
- Relics of Saint Sabbas. The relics of Saint Sabbas the Sanctified (439–532) were taken by Crusaders in the 13th century as a result of the War of Saint Sabas (1256–1270), and taken to the Church of Saint Anthony in Venice. His biography is provided in the Life of St. Saba by Cyril of Scythopolis (439–532). (PPTS XI.1)
- Translatio sancti Nicolai. Translatio Sancti Nicolai in Venetiam is an anonymous eyewitness 12th century account of Venetian contributions to the Crusades, including a description of the siege of Haifa of 1100. It was later rewritten to provide context to the translation of the relics of Saint Nicholas to Bari. It has been speculated that the author of Translatio was Gallus Anonymous. (RHC Oc. Volume 5.VII.iv, Runciman (1951), pp. 313n, 346, Runciman (1952), p. 18n)
- Relics of Watten Abbey. In 1097, Robert II of Flanders returned home with relics given to him by Roger Borsa. As recorded by a charter of his wife Clementia of Burgundy, these included the hair of the Virgin Mary and the bones of Saints Matthew and Saint Nicholas, and were taken to Watten Abbey. A full account is given in the anonymous Qualiter reliquiæ B. Nicolai, episcopi et confessoris, ad Lotharingiæ villam, quæ Portus nominatur, delatæ sunt (1101). (RHC Oc. Volume 5.VII.v, Runciman (1951), pp. 168n, 344, DK, VII)
- Relics of Saints Basil, Stephen and others. The translations of the relics of Saint Basil and Saint Stephen are described in Qualiter tabula s. Basilii Cluniacum delata fuitit (1112) and Tractus de Reliquiis s. Stephani, Cluniacum Delatis (1120). The translation of the remains of Saints Nicodème, Gamaliel, Abibon to Pisa are described in Gesta Triumphalia Pisanorum in Captione Jerusalem. (RHC Oc., Volume 5.VII.vi, VII.ix, VIII.vii)
- Shroud of Cadouin. The translation of the Holy Shroud of Cadouin (le Saint-Suaire de Cadouin) to Cadouin Abbey is described in Pancarta Caduniensis (Charter of Cadouin), Seu historia santa sudarii Jesu Christi habita ab Adhemaro episcopo, Antiochiæ, anno incarnationis Domini MIIC, in ecclesiale Caduniensem translati (1117). The shroud is believed to be the facecloth from the tomb of Christ. The account claims the relic was linked to Adhemar of Le Puy, brought from Antioch by a priest of Périgord, but it is not documented at the abbey until 1215. (RHC Oc., Volume 5.VII.vii)
- Tractatus Inventione Sanctorum Patriarcharum. The work Tractatus Inventione Sanctorum Patriarcharum Abraham, Ysaac et Jacob (Canonici Hebronensis), by an anonymous author was dictated by two monks of Hebron c. 1119. It describes a sanctuary at Hebron existing on the site of the tombs of Abraham, Isaac and Jacob before the First Crusade, and the failed attempt of Theodosius II to return the bodies of the patriarchs to Constantinople. The sepulchral crypt was despoiled by Peter of Narbonne. (RHC Oc., Volume 5.VII.viii)
- Cerbano Cerbani. Cerbano Cerbani (fl. 1125) was an Italian scholar who wrote Translatio mirifici martyris Isidori a Chio insula in civitatem Venetam (1125), describing the translation of the body of the martyr Isidore of Chios to the Basilica of Saint Mark's in Venice. The work is also a partial autobiography, providing the only information known about Cerbani. (RHC Oc., Volume 5.VII.x)
- Reliquiis Sanctæ Crucis. A work by an anonymous monk from Schaffhausen called De Reliquiis Sanctæ Crucis et Dominici Sepulcri Scaphusam Allatis (1125) describes the translation of relics of three martyrs from the Holy Land. (RHC Oc., Volume 5.VII.xi)
- The Conquest of Constantinople. Robert de Clari's La Conquête de Constantinople provides an account of the relics of Constantinople and the looting of those treasures. He was one of the last to see the Shroud of Turin prior to 1258 when Geoffroi de Charny and his wife reported ownership. Robert reportedly donated a Byzantine crystal cross reliquary to Corbie Abbey. The plunder of Nivelon of Chéris, bishop of Soissons, apparently included the heads of seven saints and the crown of St. Mark's head. Conrad of Krosigk also returned with many relics, as reported in the Deeds of the Bishops of Halberstadt.
- Exuviae Sacrae Constantinoploitanae (1877–1888) is a collection of documents edited by Paul Riant relating to the status of relics at Constantinople before 1204 and their disposition after the Fourth Crusade. A further study La croix des premiers croisés; la sainte lance; la sainte couronne was published by Fernand de Mély in 1904. (Runciman (1954), p. 494)
- Crown of Thorns. In 1241, Baldwin II, the last Latin emperor ruling from Constantinople, sold the Crown of Thorns and assorted other relics associated with Christ's Passion to Louis IX of France, as recounted in Joinville's biography Life of Saint Louis. Louis built the Sainte-Chapelle to house it. (Runciman (1954), pp. 399, 496)

=== Historical geography ===
Historical cartography, geography and topography are important sources in the study of the history of the Crusades. Some of the more important contemporaneous works are presented below. In addition, many of the accounts above, in particular those of Ahmad ibn Rustah, al-Balādhuri, ibn Jubayr, William of Rubrick, Abu'l-Fida and Rashid-al-Din Hamadani also provide geographical and architectural information.

- Tractatus de locis et statu sancte terre ierosolimitane. Tractatus de locis et statu sancte terre ierosolimitane is an anonymous work concerning the geography of the Kingdom of Jerusalem prior to the fall of the city in 1187. It also discusses the ethnography of the Christian groups living there as well as the feudal structure of the kingdom. The non-Christian groups such as Jews, Bedouins and Assassins are also discussed.
- Muhammad al-Idrisi. Muhammad al-Idrisi (1100–1165) was an Arab geographer who spent time at the court of Roger II of Sicily who commissioned the Tabula Rogeriana. The Tabula Rogeriana was the most advanced map of the world at the time it was published in 1158 and was still in use at the time of Christopher Columbus. He also wrote a universal geography Nuzhat al-Mushtaq, translated by Lebanese Maronite Gabriel Sionita (1577–1648). (Runciman (1954), pp. 354n, 498)
- Yaqut al-Hamawi. Yaqut al-Hamawi (1179–1229) was an Arab scholar whose work Kitāb Mu'jam al-Buldān (Alphabetical Dictionary of Geography) is simultaneously a book of geography, history, biography and Islam. Much of his work was derived from travel through Egypt, Syria and Persia. (Runciman (1954), pp. 358n, 499)
- Ibn Shaddad. Izz al-Din ibn Shaddad (1217-1285) was an Aleppan geographer employed by the Ayyubids who wrote Al-a'laq al-khatira fi dhikr umara' al-Sham wa'l-Jazira, a historical geography of Syria and al-Jazira. He also wrote a biography of the Mamluk sultan Baibars. (Runciman (1954), p. 498)
- Ibn Abd al-Zahir. Ibn Abd al-Zahir (1223–1293), also known as Muhi ad-Din ibn Abdazzahir, was an Egyptian historian who wrote extensively of the Mamluk sultans as well as a geographical study Kitāb al-Rawḍah al-Bahīyah used extensively by al-Makrizi. His work Lives of Baibars and Qalawun is a biography of sultans Baibars and al-Mansur Qalawun. (Runciman (1954), pp. 327n, 485, 499)
- Taqwim al-Buldan. Taqwim al-Buldan (A Sketch of the Countries) is a text on geography by Abu'l-Fida (died 1331). It includes descriptions of the major cities of the world and contains the first known reference to the circumnavigator's paradox, in which travelers gain or lose a day circling the globe.
- Al-Dimashqi. Al-Dimashqi (1256–1327), the Damascene, was an Arab geographer whose work K. Nuk̲h̲bat al-Dahr fi ʿAd̲j̲āʾib al-Barr wal-Baḥr (Cosmographie de Ch. A. Abd. M. de-Dimichqi, or Geography) covered Greater Syria as well as Southeast Asia. (Runciman (1954), pp. 358n, 498)
- Hamdallah Mustawfi. Hamdallah Mustawfi (1281-1349) was a Persian historian and geographer whose work on geography Nozhat al-qolub may be derived from a lost work of Rashid-al-Din Hamadani, the third part of his Jami' al-tawarikh.
- Marino Sanudo. Marino Sanudo (Sanuto) the Elder (1260–1338) was a Venetian statesman and geographer who wrote Chronique de Romanie, and Liber Secretorum Fidelium Crucis (Secrets of True Crusaders to help them to recover the Holy Land), a work written in 1321 on geography which was offered to the pope as a manual for the reconquest of the Holy Land. The earliest surviving edition of Liber Secretorum Fidelium Crucis is from Volume II of Gesta Dei per Francos. (PPTS XII.2, RISc 22, Ges. D., Runciman (1954), p. 497)
- Bibliotheca geographica Palaestinae. Bibliotheca geographica Palaestinae provides the summaries of over 3500 books on the geography of the Holy Land issued between 355 and 1878, as compiled and edited by German historian of the Crusades Reinhold Röhricht in 1890. His Karten und Pläne zur Palästinakunde aus dem 7 bis 16 Jahrhundert is a catalog of the eight known Crusader maps of Jerusalem.

== Related disciplines and documents ==
Crusader historians have made use of numerous religious, legal and personnel documents as well as scientific disciples such as archaeology in their attempt to accurately depict their chronicles. These include legal treatises of the Crusader States, Papal documents, and auxiliary sciences of history including genealogy, archaeological studies, numismatics and archeoseismology.

=== Organization and administration of the Kingdom ===
The organization and administration of the Kingdom of Jerusalem provides much information to the histories of the Crusades. In particular, the legal documents concerning the Crusades and later governing of the Kingdom of Jerusalem are of significance to the study of the Crusades and form the first series of the RHC, entitled Assises de Jérusalem ou Recueil des ouvrages de jurisprudence composés pendant le XIIIe siècle dans les royaumes de Jérusalem et de Chypre, edited by Auguste-Arthur, Count of Beugnot. Relevant texts are listed below.

The Assizes of Jerusalem are a set of six legal texts (see I-VI below) from the kingdoms of Jerusalem and Cyprus dating from the late 12th and early 13th centuries. According to legend, the court system was established by Godfrey of Bouillon in 1099, with the king serving as judge of the high court. The laws were lost when Jerusalem was taken in 1187, and were kept at the Church of the Holy Sepulchre. Known as Letres dou Sepulcre, Philip of Novara allegedly received the original laws from a jurist named Raoul of Saint Omer (died 1220). Regardless, the legend allowed the envisioning of a legal structure existing since the founding of the kingdom. (RHC Lois, Volumes 1, 2, MPL 155, Runciman (1952), p. 479, Runciman (1954), p. 484)

- I. Livre de Jean d'Ibelin. was written by jurist John of Ibelin (1215–1266), count of Jaffa and Ascalon. Ibelin wrote his lengthy legal work from 1264–1266. The treatise enumerates the laws of the kingdom and procedures of the feudal council, the Haute Cour. It also included details about the kingdom's ecclesiastical and baronial structures. (RHC Lois, Volume 1.I Runciman (1954), p. 484)
- II. Livre de Geoffroy le Tort. is a short legal treatise written by a minor noble named Geoffroy le Tort (Tor) after 1265. The work addresses feudal customs such as homage, and is partially derived from that of Philip of Novara. (RHC Lois, Volume 1.II)
- III. Livre de Jacques d'Ibelin written by James of Ibelin, count of Jaffa from 1266–1268, the son of John of Ibelin. His short treatise describes the practices, customs and ordinances of the kingdom and is often published in conjunction with that of Geoffrey le Tort. (RHC Lois, Volume 1.III)
- IV. Livre de Philippe de Navarre. This legal treatise, also known as Le Livre de forme de plait, was written by Philip of Novara in the 1250s. The work is from an aristocratic viewpoint, written in the literary language of knights, and is a handbook on feudal law. (RHC Lois, Volume 1.IV Runciman (1954), p. 484)
- V. La Clef des Assises de la Haute Cour du royaume de Jérusalem et de Chypre. The work La Clef des Assises de la Haute Cour was written in the mid-13th century by an anonymous author and details the laws of the Haute Cour of the kingdom. (RHC Lois, Volume 1.V)
- VI. Livre au Roi. Livre au Roi is the earliest of the assizes, written c.1200 for Amalric II of Jerusalem. It is the only text preserving the établissement of King Baldwin II, which allowed the king to disinherit his vassals, bypassing the normal judgement of the Haute Cour. The work also includes the Assise sur la ligece, a law promulgated by Amalric I of Jerusalem which made each lord a direct vassal of the king with equal voting rights granted to vavasours as those of barons. (RHC Lois, Volume 1.VI)
- Livre des Assises de la Cour des Bourgeois. Livre des Assises de la Cour des Bourgeois discusses formation and procedures of the Burgess court of the kingdom, Cour des Bourgeois, including the legal matters of resident Franks below the noble class. The work was written from 1229–1244 and was compiled in stages by multiple authors. It also served as a handbook for members of the court, providing descriptions of the responsibilities of officers of the court, the rights of burgesses, and when they could utilize the court. Legal matters in the work include misdemeanors, the sale of property, the legal rights of landowners and renters, and rules on lending, marriage, inheritance, dowry, illegitimacy and wills and testaments. (RHC Lois, Volume 2.I, Runciman (1954), p. 484)
- Regesta Regni Hierosolymitani. published 1893–1904, is a collection of over nine hundred charters and other documents issued by the royal chancery of the Kingdom of Jerusalem compiled by German historian Reinhold Röhricht. (Runciman (1951), p. 343)
- Assizes of Antioch provided the legal code for the Principality of Antioch similar to those of the kingdom. Each of the Crusader states had assizes, but that of Antioch is the only one to survive, through a translation by Sempad the Constable. (Runciman (1954), p. 484)
- Assizes of Romania. The Assizes of Romania were the collection of legal codes compiled in Principality of Achaea that became the foundation of the laws of the states of Frankokratia following the Partitio terrarium imperil Romania in 1204. (Runciman (1954), pp. 485, 495)

=== Papal and other religious documents ===
Major papal and other religious documents relevant to Crusader history, some of which have been published in Patrologia Latina (MPL), include the following.

Papal letters are generally referred to in medieval times as Litterae apostolicae (Apostolic letters) and include the Papal bulls typically used to call for the early Crusades. Some of the more relevant ones are presented below. (Runciman (1952), p. 479)

Registres des Popes. Papal regesta (letters, documents) of 13th century popes from Innocent III (1198–1216) forward are included in Registres des Popes, Series 2 of Bibliothèque des Ecoles françaises d'Athènes et de Rome (Library of the French schools of Greece and Rome).

Liber Pontificalis (The Book of Popes) is a collection of biographies of the popes from Saint Peter through Pius II (1458–1464). The work includes Vita Urbani II, the life of Urban II, and Annales Romani. (Runciman (1954), pp. 495, 497)

Annales Romani. Annales Romani is a history of the city of Rome from 1044 to 1187 (with gaps), reprinted in Liber Pontificalis. The Annales include an account of the death of Urban III and the letters of Clement III.

Acta Sanctorum. Acta Sanctorum (Aa. Ss.) is an encyclopedic work in 68 volumes providing hagiographic accounts of the lives of Christian saints. The designator Bollandiana (for the Bollandist Society) is often used to distinguish it from the Acta Sanctorum Hiberniae. The Bollandists also publish the quarterly Analecta Bollandiana.

Acta Sanctorum Ordinis Sancti Benedict. Acta Sanctorum Ordinis Sancti Benedict (Aa. Ss. OSB) is a history in nine volumes of the Benedictine saints published between 1668 and 1701 by Jean Mabillon and Luc d'Achery. (Runciman (1951), p. 342)

Sacrorum Conciliorum. Sacrorum Conciliorum nova et amplissima collectio (Sa. Co.), written by the Italian historian Giovanni Domenico Mansi (1692-1769), is a vast edition of Church councils from the First Council of Nicaea in 325 through the Council of Florence in 1438. (Runciman (1951), p. 343)

The Papacy during the Crusades.

- Urban II. In 1095, pope Urban II (1088–1099) addressed the Council of Clermont of 1095, issuing a call-to-arms for Christians to go to the Holy Land to aid emperor Alexios I Komnenos, in what was to become the First Crusade. Gesta Francorum and the works of Fulcher of Chartres, Robert the Monk, Baldric of Dol and Guibert of Nogent include accounts of that address. Later, the pope issued a Letter of Instruction to the Crusaders. Accounts of the address of Urban II at Clermont are found in Volume I.2 of Translations and Reprints from the Original Sources of European History (Trans/Rep), edited by Dana Carleton Munro (1866–1933). (Runciman (1951), pp. 108, 346)
- Canons of the Council of Clermont. Lambert of Arras, bishop of Arras, serving from 1095-1115, prepared the Canons of the Council of Clermont, of which only the 33rd is pertinent to the First Crusade. During the council, Lambert was kidnapped by a robber-baron who released his captive upon the threat of excommunication. The canons are found in Volume XX of Sacrorum Conciliorum. See also Trans/Rep, Volume 1.2.II. (Sa. Co., XX, Runciman (1951), pp. 109n, 346)
- Paschal II. Pope Paschal II (1099–1118) issued the papal bull Pie postulatio volunatis in 1113 recognizing the establishment of the Knights Hospitaller. (MPL 163, Runciman (1952), p. 158n)
- Celestine II. Pope Celestine II (1143-1144) issued papal bull Milites Templi in 1144 to relating to the Knights Templar and Knights Hospitaller.
- Eugene III. In response to the fall of Edessa in 1144, pope Eugene III (1145–1153) issued a papal bull known as Quantum praedecessores to undertake the Second Crusade to the Holy Land. (Runciman (1952), p. 248)
- Innocent II. Pope Innocent II (1130–1143) issued the papal bull Omne datum optimum in 1139 endorsing the Knights Templar.
- Alexander III. Vita Alexandri III is the biography of pope Alexander III (1159–1181) in Liber Pontificalis, Volume II. (Runciman (1952), p. 495)
- St. Bernard of Clairvaux. St. Bernard of Clairvaux (1090–1153) was a French abbot who was commissioned by Eugene III to preach the new Crusade. His Epistolae include accounts of the killing of Jews in the Rhineland in 1146 also reported in Joseph ha-Kohen's Chronicle. After its failure, Bernard mentioned this crusade in De Consideratione (On consideration: advice to a Pope), a call for ascetic living at the papal court. (MPL 182, 185, Runciman (1951), p. 343, Runciman (1952), pp. 236n, 255n, 495).
- Urban III. Urban III (1185-1187) was pope when Jerusalem fell. As recounted in Annales Romani and by Ernoul, the archbishop of Tyre Joscius was dispatched to Rome, and Urban died upon hearing the news. (Runciman (1954), p. 4n)
- Gregory VIII. Pope Gregory VIII (1187) assumed the papacy after the sudden death of Urban III and immediately sent a letter to the faithful of the West about the catastrophic loss of Jerusalem, recounted in Roger of Howden's Gesta Regis Ricardi. His papal bull issued in 1187, known as Audita tremendi, called for a Third Crusade in order to recover the city. (Runciman (1954), p. 5n)
- Clement III. Pope Clement III (1187-1191), upon assuming the papacy, quickly made contact with the emperor Frederick I, while Joscius moved to report to the kings of France and England, as recounted in Annales Romani. (Runciman (1954), p. 5n)
- Innocent III. In 1198, pope Innocent III issued the papal bull Post Miserabile calling for the Fourth Crusade. After the sack of Constantinople, he sent a reprimand to the papal legate before embracing the inevitable. Later, Innocent called for the Fifth Crusade during the Fourth Council of the Lateran in 1215. (MPL 214–217, Runciman (1954), p. 496)
- Gesta Innocentii III. Gesta Innocentii III (The Deeds of Innocent III) was written between 1204–1209 by a member of the pope's curia. (MPL 214, Runciman (1954), pp. 109–112, 496)
- Peter of Capua. Peter of Capua (died 1214) was a theologian who served as papal legate and cardinal. After his participation in the Fourth Crusade, he was sent to secure papal support for emperor Isaac II Angelos. His works include Alphabetum in artem sermocinandi and Summa. (Runciman (1954), p. 117n)
- Honorius III. The letters and documents of pope Honorius III (1216–1227) are published in the Regesta Honorii Papae III (edited by Pietro Pressutti), with insight into papal administration of the Fifth Crusade and preparation for the Sixth Crusade. (Runciman (1954), pp. 146n, 484, 494)
- Gregory IX. Pope Gregory IX (1227–1241) issued papal bull Rachel suum videns in 1234 calling for what was to become known as the Barons' Crusade. He also updated canonical laws in his Decretales Gregorii IX, critiqued by Hostiensis (died 1271), a canonist who was an influential writer on the legal aspects of Crusading. (MGH Epistolas, XIII.1, Runciman (1954), p. 496)
- Humbert of Romans. Humbert of Romans (1190/1200–1277) was a Dominican friar who wrote De predicatione crucis and De eruditione praedicatorum outlining his approach to preaching the Crusades. He is known for his support for the Seventh Crusade under Louis IX of France. His Opus tripartitum, to be presented at the Second Council of Lyon, discussed reforms for successful crusading. (Runciman (1954), pp. 340–341, 496)
- William of Tripoli. William of Tripoli (c. 1220 – after 1273) was a Dominican missionary living in Acre who was sent by Louis IX of France with André de Longjumeau to the Mongol Güyük Khan. William wrote Tractatus de Statu Saracenorum et de Mahumeti pseudopropheta at the request of pope Gregory X (1271-1276) calling for missionary work rather than warfare. (Runciman (1954), pp. 340n, 498)
- Second Council of Lyon. The Second Council of Lyon of 1272 included a call by Gregory X for a new Crusade, in liaison with the Mongols, to recover the Holy Land. The pope's death in 1276 put an end to these plans. (Runciman (1954), pp. 340–341).
- Clement V. Pope Clement V (1305–1314) issued the papal bull Vox in excelso in 1312 in order to dissolve the Knights Templar. (Runciman (1954), p. 438)
- Martin of Opava. Martin of Opava (died 1278) was a Dominican chronicler whose work Chronicon pontificum et imperatorum includes biographies of popes from Saint Peter through John XXI (1276-1277) and was used as a source of Rashid-al-Din Hamadani's Jami' al-tawarikh.

Earlier references.

- De civitate Dei. With Saint Augustine's De civitate Dei, the concept of a Just War was introduced, becoming more pronounced with the advent of Islam in the 7th century. By the 9th century, popes including Leo IV, Nicholas I and John VIII promoted ideas that war against the enemies of Christianity might not only be permitted but desired. (Runciman (1951), pp. 84, 344)
- Saint Basil. Saint Basil (330-379) was bishop of Caesarea Mazaca who wrote over 300 letters in addition to his theological work. His Opera includes letters to Saint Ambrose on the authenticity of relics and another on the Eastern concept of war. (MPG 29-32, Runciman (1951), pp. 41n, 83n, 347)
- Martin I. Pope Martin I (649-655) was accused by emperor Constans II of collaboration with Muslims, explaining in a letter to Theodore I Calliopas that he was simply sending alms to Jerusalem. Nevertheless, the emperor had Martin arrested by Theodore and he died in captivity. (Epistolæ in MPL 87, Runciman (1951), pp. 42n, 346)
- Leo IV. Pope Leo IV (847-855), promoting the concept of Holy War, wrote in his Epistolae that those dying in defense of the Church would receive a heavenly reward. The papacy's battle with Hincmar began during Leos tenure. (Sa. Co., XIV, Runciman (1951), pp. 84n, 346)
- Nicholas I. Pope Nicholas I (858-867) continued the promotion of a Holy War wrote in his Epistolae that men sanctioned by the Church for their sins should only bear arms to fight the infidels. The conflicts between Rome and Hincmar reached their peak under Nicholas' papacy. (MGH Epistolas, VI, Runciman (1951), pp. 84n, 346)
- John VIII. Pope John VIII (872-882) wrote in his Epistolæ et decreta that those who died in a Holy War would be designated as martyrs and their sins remitted, as long as they remained pure at heart. John and Charles the Bald joined in opposing Hincmar's attempts to promote the supremacy of the Church of Reims over all others. (MPL 126 (Hincmar), Sa. Co., XVII, Runciman (1951), pp. 84n, 345)
- Bruno of Cologne. Saint Bruno of Cologne (c. 1030-1101), also known as Berno, was the founder of the Carthusian Order and mentor of Urban II. In his Libellus de Officio Missae, he discusses the alleged conflict (since disputed) between the patriarch Sergius II of Constantinople and the pope Sergius IV (1009-1012). (MPL 152, Runciman (1951), pp. 95n, 344)
- Leo IX. In 1053, pope Leo IX (1049-1054) sent a letter to patriarch Michael I Cerularius asserting that the Donation of Constantine was real, asserting papal supremacy. The letter is in his Epistolae, and Leo was captured by the Normans shortly thereafter, dying in captivity. The pope's position was supported by a letter to Michael from Peter III, patriarch of Antioch. (MPL 143, Sa. Co., XIX, MPG 120, Runciman (1951), pp. 58, 96-97, 346, 348)
- Victor II. In 1056, pope Victor II (1056-1057) wrote to empress Theodora III Porphyrogenita requesting that she rescind her order levying a tax on pilgrims to the Holy Land, suggesting that customs officers in both Constantinople and Jerusalem were engaged in the practice. (MPL 149 [wrongly attributed to Victor III], Runciman (1951), pp. 49n, 347)
- Gregory VII. Prior to the First Crusade, pope Gregory VII (1073–1085) proposed to William I, Count of Burgundy in 1075 that he form a task force with Raymond of Saint-Gilles to support the Greeks against the Normans in southern Italy and then proceed to Constantinople. Chronicler Bernold of Constance, documenter of the reforms proposed by Gregory, is also the major source on the Council of Piacenza. These are collected in Monumenta Gregoriana by Philipp Jaffé. (MPL 148, MGH Epistolas, II, Runciman (1951), pp. 99, 344)
- Bernold of Constance. Bernold of Constance (c. 1054-1100), also known as Bernold of Saint-Blaise, was a historian and defender of the church reforms of Gregory VII. His work Chronicon provides a history of events through the late 11th century, including an eyewitness account of the Council of Piacenza in 1095. (MGH Scriptores, V, Runciman (1951), pp. 105n, 344)

=== The Military Orders and the Holy Land after 1291 ===
The military/hospitaller religious orders of the Holy Land include the Knights Templar, Knights Hospitaller and Teutonic Knights. Other works relating to the orders and activities in the Holy land after the fall of Acre include Gestes des Chiprois and Thaddeus of Naples' Hystoria de desolacione civitatis Acconensis. Bibliographies of the Hospitallers and their founder Blessed Gerard have been published by Jonathan Riley-Smith and Giuseppe Perta.

- The Cartulaire général de l'Ordre des Hospitaliers (Cart.) (1100–1310), edited by Joseph Delaville Le Roulx, is a collection of original documents on the history of the Knights Hospitaller published in 1894 and 1906. The statutes are identified as Rule (Cart. 70), esgarts (judgements) and usances (Cart. 2213), and general decrees, issued from 1176-1306. (Runciman (1952), p. 494, Runciman (1954), p. 493)
- Miracula. Miracula et regula hospitalis sancti Johannis Jerosolimitani (Riwle) is an account of the founding of the Knights Hospitaller written in 1181/1185, tracing the beginnings to the days of the Maccabees, with Antiochus as the founder and Zacharias, father of John the Baptist, as the first master. In this account, the order was destroyed by Titus when the Romans sacked Jerusalem in 70 AD. The Miracula's theory has been supplanted by that of William of Tyre (cf. Foundation and Early History). (Cart. 914, 2674, 3002)
- Vetus Chronicon Amalphitanum. Vetus Chronicon Amalphitanum is an anonymous work that describes the Amalfians who founded two hospitals in Jerusalem, one for men, one for women. The works of Amatus of Montecassino, Sicard of Cremona and William of Tyre support this narrative.
- Exordium Hospitalariorum. Exordium Hospitalariorum is collection of accounts of the Knights Hospitaller in six parts, including: (i) De prima institutione Hospitalariorum; (ii) Tractus de exordio sacrae domus Hospitalis Jerosolimitani; (iii) Comment le sainte maison de l'Hospital de S. Johan de Jerusalem commença by William of Santo Stefano; (iv) De Primordiis et Inventione Sacræ Religionis Jerosolymorum; and two works by William Caoursin (v.i) Primordium et origo sacri Xenodochii atque Ordinis militiae Sancti Joannis Baptistae Hospitalariorum Hierosolimitani, and (v.ii) Le fondement du S. Hospital de l'ordre de la chevalerie de S. Jehan Baptiste de Jerusalem. (RHC Oc., Volume 5.IX)
- De prima institutione Hospitalariorum. De prima institutione Hospitalariorum is a short, anonymous account of the Knights Hospitaller. The work is derivative of William of Tyre's account, and discusses the conflicts between the order and the religious authorities. (RHC Oc., Volume 5.IX.i)
- Tractus de exordio sacrae domus Hospitalis Jerosolimitani. Tractus de exordio sacrae domus Hospitalis Jerosolimitani is a history of the Knights Hospitaller written by an unknown author known only as Joseph the "Historiographer." The work is the second part of Exordium Hospitalariorum. (RHC Oc., Volume 5.IX.ii, Runciman (1951), pp. 48, 345)
- William of Santo Stefano (Guillaume de Saint-Estève) (fl. 1290–1302) was a scholar and a Knight Hospitaller who wrote Comment le sainte maison de l'Hospital de S. Johan de Jerusalem commença on the founding of the order. The work disputed the account presented in the Miracula, legends which take the order's history back to before New Testament times and identity John the Baptist's parents as early custodians of the Hospital. In the 1260s, the grand master believed he was descended from Saint Stephen protomartyr, and William's work proposed that the Order was founded by Blessed Gerard reflecting the view of William of Tyre. (RHC Oc., Volume 5.IX.iii)
- De Primordiis et Inventione Sacræ Religionis Jerosolymorum. The anonymous De Primordiis et Inventione Sacræ Religionis Jerosolymorum (On the Origin and Discovery of Religion in Jerusalem) is a history of the Hospitallers from the time of Raymond du Puy until their establishment at Rhodes in 1310. It continues the repudiation of the Miracula and appears to be closely related to the works of Caoursin. (RHC Oc., Volume 5.IX.iv)
- Peter of Dusburg. Peter of Dusburg (died after 1326) was a German historian and chronicler of the Teutonic Knights through his work Chronicon terrae Prussiae (1326).
- William Caoursin (1430–1501) was the historian of the Knights Hospitaller after 1460 and wrote a number of works on the order, including Rhodiorum historia, Primordium et origo sacri Xenodochii atque Ordinis militiae Sancti Joannis Baptistae Hospitalariorum Hierosolimitani, and Le fondement du S. Hospital de l'ordre de la chevalerie de S. Jehan Baptiste de Jerusalem. (RHC Oc., Volume 5.IX.v)
- Primordium et origo sacri Xenodochii. Primordium et origo sacri Xenodochii atque Ordinis militiae Sancti Joannis Baptistae Hospitalariorum Hierosolimitani (Foundation and management of the hospital of Saint John in Jerusalem) is a rewriting of the statutes of the order, written by William Caoursin in 1489. Directed by grand master Pierre d'Aubusson, the work converted the statutes from a chronology to one organized by subject matter. Caoursin revived the legend of the Miracula that the order was founded by Judas Maccabeus and destroyed by the Romans during their sack of Jerusalem in 70 AD. (RHC Oc., Volume 5.IX.v(i))
- Le fondement du S. Hospital de l'ordre. Le fondement du S. Hospital de l'ordre de la chevalerie de S. Jehan Baptiste de Jerusalem is an old French version of Primordium et origo sacri Xenodochii, originally written in Latin. In 1493, it was translated into the various vulgar languages in use among the Christian peoples. (RHC Oc., Volume 5.IX.v(ii))
- Rhodiorum historia. Rhodiorum historia is a collection of histories of the Knights Hospitaller (1489) written by William Caoursin. He also wrote Stabilimenta Rhodiorum militum (1480), a compilation of the order's rules, Obsidionis Rhodiae urbis descripto, an account of the siege of Rhodes in 1480. The works are part of the collection at the National Library of Malta.
- Cartulaire de l'église du Saint Sépulcre de Jérusalem. Cartulaire de l'église Du Saint Sépulcre de Jérusalem, Manuscrits du Vatican (Cartulary of the Church of the Holy Sepulcher of Jerusalem), edited by French historian M. Eugène de Rozière (1820–1886), provide the cartularies for the Canons Regular of the Holy Sepulchre. The Canons Regular were formally recognized by Paschal II in 1113, but may date to the capture of Jerusalem in 1099. (MPL 155 [Godefridum, Appendix II], Runciman (1952), pp. 178n, 219n, 322n, 495)
- Regum Jerusalem, Principum Prælatorum. Regum Jerusalem, Principum Prælatorum, Epistolæ Viginti Sex is a report provided to Louis VII of France in 1172 concerning the king, princes and prelates of the Kingdom of Jerusalem. Included are Amalric of Jerusalem, Bohemond III of Antioch, Amalric of Nesle, Latin patriarch, Bertrand de Blanchefort, Grand Master of the Knights Templar, and Gilbert of Assailly, Grand Master of the Knights Hospitaller. (MPL 155 [Godefridum, Appendix II])
- La Prise de Damiette en 1219. La Prise de Damiette en 1219 (Fragmentum Provinciale de Captione Damiate) is an anonymous account of the Siege of Damietta of 1218–1219 and the roles of the military orders, John of Brienne and Sauvary of Mauléan in the battle and its aftermath. (Runciman (1954), pp. 161–163, 495)
- Iohannes de Tulbia. (fl. 1217–1220), known as John of Tulbia (Tolve), was a priest in Potenza who wrote Gesta obsidionis Damiatæ De Domino (Deeds of the siege of Damietta) based on his own eyewitness account and Johanne Rege Jerusalem, a biography of John of Brienne. A related tale by an unknown author is Liber Duellii Christiani in Obsidione Domiate exacti has also been attributed to Tulbia. (MGH Scriptores XXXI, Runciman (1954), pp. 133n, 496)
- De constructione castri Saphet is an anonymous account of the rebuilding of the fortress of Safed by the Knights Templar between 1241-1244. The Templar had controlled the castle beginning in 1168, and it was under the control of Saladin from 1188. Al-Mu'azzam Isa, emir of Damascus, had the fortress destroyed in 1219 and it was recovered by the Templar in 1240.
- Ricaut Bonomel (fl. 1265–1266) was a Knight Templar and troubadour at the time of the Eighth Crusade whose work Poems is traced to between the capture of the Hospitaller castle at Arsuf in 1265 and the loss of the Templar fortress at Saphet in 1266 by Mamluk sultan Baibars. (Runciman (1954), p. 495)
- Pierre Dubois (1255–1321) was a French propagandist who wrote De recuperatione Terre Sancte about recovery of the Holy Land using the wealth of the Knights Templar and Knights Hospitaller. (Runciman (1954), p. 495)
- Bruno von Schauenburg (1205–1281), Bishop of Olmütz, was an advisor to Ottokar II of Bohemia and published his memoirs Bericht sometime after 1272. As described there, after the death of Richard of Cornwall in 1272, Bruno pressed pope Gregory X to appoint Ottokar II as king of Germany, citing the failure of the Teutonic Knights in their pursuing Lord Edward's Crusade. The position went instead to Rudolf I of Germany. (Runciman (1954), pp. 339, 495)
- Collectio de Scandalis Ecclesiae. Gilbert of Tournai (died 1284) was a Franciscan historian linked to Saint Bonaventure (1221–1274) whom he accompanied to the Second Council of Lyon of 1272. Gilbert wrote a Collectio de Scandalis Ecclesiae (Collection of Church scandals), addressed to pope Gregory X, taking an adversarial position to the Knights Templars and Knights Hospitallers, suggesting that they be united into a single institution. He also castigated the negligence of Christians towards the Holy Land, and called for a new Crusade. (Runciman (1954), pp. 339, 495)
- Via ad Terram Sanctam was an anonymous document on suggestions and plans for the retaking of the Holy Land written around 1289. It is also known as Memoria Terre Sancte. (Runciman (1954), p. 497)
- De Excidio Urbis Acconis. De Excidio Urbis Acconis (Destruction of the City of Acre) is an anonymous account of the siege of Acre of 1291, with earlier material based on William of Tyre's Historia. De Excidio presents a more popular view (as opposed to nobleman) of the history and of the Knights Hospitaller's last stand. The work takes a dim view of the Knights Templar and, in particular, Otto de Grandson, master of the English knights at Acre. For other works on the siege, see Gestes des Chiprois and Hystoria de desolacione civitatis Acconensis. (Runciman (1954), pp. 419, 495)
- Galvano da Levanto, a physician in the papal court of Boniface VIII, was a propagandist who wrote Liber Sancti Passagii Christocolarum contra Saracenos pro recuperatione Terra Sanctae in 1295 dedicated to Philip IV of France called for a new Crusade. He was influenced by Thaddeus of Naples' account of the fall of Acre. (Runciman (1954), pp. 431, 495)
- Ramon Lull (1232/1236–1315), also known as Raymond Lully or Llull, was a Spanish missionary to the Arab world who in 1295 presented pope Boniface VIII with the document Liber de Fine proposing a new crusade and the combining the military orders into a single organization. Lull was stoned to death in Tunisia in 1315. (Runciman (1954), pp. 431, 496)
- Peter of Dusburg (died after 1326) was a German chronicler of the Teutonic Knights though his history Chronicon terrae Prussiae that includes a discussion of the origin of the order in 1192 at Acre and its history in Outremer.
- Tabulae Ordinis Teutonici. Tabulae Ordinis Teutonici (1869) is a collection of original documents related to the Teutonic Knights. Edited by German archivist Ernst Strehlke (1834–1869), completed posthumously by Philipp Jaffé. (Runciman (1954), pp. 266n, 494)
- Jacques de Molay. In 1306, Jacques de Molay (c. 1240 – 1314), last Grand Master of the Knights Templar, provided a report to pope Clement V recommending against the merging of the Templars and Hospitallers. Reprinted in Étienne Baluze's, Vitae Paparum Avenionensium. (Runciman (1954), pp. 434n, 496)
- Foulques de Villaret (died 1327) was Grand Master of the Knights Hospitaller when he wrote Mémoire de Foulques de Villaret sur la croisade. At the time of the Council of Vienne in 1311-1312, Foulques wrote to Philip IV of France of the Hospitaller's preparation for any future crusade. (Runciman (1954), pp. 434, 497)
- William Durand (died 1328/1330) was bishop of Mende who wrote in 1311 a three-volume work De modo celebrandi concilii et corruptelis for pope Clement V, who later issued papal bull Vox in excelso. His work Informatio brevis de Passagio futuro, in Historie littéraire de la France, XXXV, a treatise published in 1312 on a possible Crusade to the Holy Land. (Runciman (1954), pp. 433, 495)
- La Devise des Chemins de Babiloine. La Devise des Chemins de Babiloine is a document prepared for Foulques de Villaret (died 1327), Grand Master of the Knights Hospitaller, providing an assessment of Mamluk forces, as research for a possible invasion. When the document was written in 1306–1307, al-Nasir Muhammad was sultan of Egypt and Syria.
- Jean de Langhe. Jean de Langhe (died 1383), abbot of St. Bertin's from 1365–1383, was also known as John of Ypres or Johannes Iperius, and is believed by some to be the same person as John Mandeville. Langhe entered St. Bertins in 1340 and wrote his history of the abbey Chronicon Sythiense Sancti Bertini covering the years 590–1294. Thomas of Saint-Bertin sold the castle of La Fauconnerie south of Acre to the Knights Templar in 1276. Material before the 11th century is based on Folcuin's Gesta abbatum Lobiensium. (Runciman (1954), pp. 344, 496)
- Trials of the Knights Templar. The trials of the Knights Templar in Cyprus in 1311 are discussed in Gestes des Chiprois, the Chroniques d'Amadi et de Stromboldi and Historia overo commentarii de Cipro. (Runciman (1954), pp. 495, 496, 501)

=== Correspondence, charters and privileges ===
Crusaders and other travelers to the Holy Land have documented their experiences through personal correspondence, and many of these have been recognized by historians, for example the letters of Stephen, Count of Blois and Anselm of Ribemont. In addition, charters and privileges have been documented. Some of the more important documents are listed below. Correspondence from before 1100 can be found in Heinrich Hagenmeyer's Die Kreuzzugsbriefe aus den Jahren, 1088-1100 (DK) and in Trans/Rep, Volume 1.2.IV.

- Letter of Alexios I to Robert I of Flanders. Imperatoris Constantinopolis Epistola ad Robert Flandrie Comitem et Omnes Christianos, the so-called Epistula spuria of 1093 from Alexios I to Robert I of Flanders regarding the situation in the Holy Land and a request for help, was later used by Bohemond of Taranto against the emperor. (MPL 155, Runciman (1951), p. 104)
- Letters of the First Crusade. Two of the oft-cited letters from Crusaders are those of Stephen, Count of Blois, to his wife Adela of Normandy in June 1097 from Nicaea, and March 1098 from Antioch (a third letter has been lost), and that of Anselm of Ribemont to his superior Manasses II, archbishop of Reims, sent from Antioch in November 1097. (RHC, Oc., Volume 3.X, MPL 155, Runciman (1951), pp. 222, 333, 344, 346, DK IV, VIII, X)
- Letters of Godfrey of Bouillon. Patrologia Latina provides the Epistolæ I-V, 1096-1100, Concio ad Milites Christianos and Diplomata of Godfrey of Bouillon issued during the First Crusade. (MPL 155)
- Letters from Symeon II. Symeon II of Jerusalem (c. 1080–1099) sent a letter with Adhemar of Le Puy from Antioch to the Western church describing the progress of the Crusade. (Runciman (1951), pp. 222, 346, DK VI, IX)
- Correspondence of Bohemond. Bohemond of Taranto wrote a number of letters to fellow Crusader leaders including Raymond of Saint-Gilles, Godfrey of Bouillon, Robert Curthose, Robert II of Flanders and Eustace III of Boulogne. (Runciman (1951), p. 344, DK XII, XVI)
- Charters. Noteworthy charters include that entered into by Bohemond with the Genoese at Antioch following the capture of the city in 1098, granting them certain properties and privileges. Clementia of Burgundy recorded a charter concerning the relics returned by her husband Robert II of Flanders. (Runciman (1951), pp. 168n, 251n, 344-345, DK, VII, XIV)
- Privileges. Privileges were granted to Crusaders by Urban II, Eugene III, Philip II of France, the Fourth Lateran Council, emperor Frederick II and Louis IX of France, among others. Original documents for such privileges are found in Trans/Rep, Volume 1.2.III.
- Letter from the Clergy of Lucca. The clergy of Lucca wrote to their parishioners of the siege of Antioch of 1097-1098, describing the despair of the Crusaders and desertion of some of their members, in particular William de Grantmesnil (cognatus Boemundi), husband of Bohemond's half-sister Mabilla. (Runciman (1951), pp. 238n, 344, DK XVII)
- Letter of Dagobert on Jerusalem. In 1100, Dagobert of Pisa, Latin Patriarch of Jerusalem, wrote to Bohemond of Taranto offering him the lordship of Jerusalem in opposition to the knights of the city who supported Baldwin of Boulogne. The letter was intercepted and Bohemond captured shortly thereafter. (Runciman (1951), pp. 311–312, 345, DK XVIII, XXII)
- Correspondence of Paschal II. Pope Paschal II sent and number of letters to clergy concerning the Holy Land prior to 1100. In 1116, Paschal sent a letter reinstating Arnulf of Chocques to the post of patriarch of Jerusalem. (RHC Oc., Volume 5.VII.iv, MPL 163, Runciman (1951), p. 346, Runciman (1952), pp. 18n, 104, DK XIX, XXII, XXIII, AA, Vol XII, 24, p. 704)
- Letters from Conrad III of Germany. During the Second Crusade, Conrad III of Germany wrote of the crusade to Wibald, abbot of Corvey, about status of his contingent, especially after the devastating loss at the siege of Damascus in 1148.
- Letters on the Fall of Jerusalem. In 1187, after the siege of Jerusalem, a certain Ansbert wrote of Saladin's victory to the Master of the Hospitallers. A Templar known only as Terence provided a report to his brethren and Henry II of England. Aimery of Limoges, Latin Patriarch of Antioch, also sent a letter to Henry II about the travails in the East. Henry's response was unjustifiably optimistic. All are recounted in Roger of Howden's Gesta Regis Ricardi. (Runciman (1954), p. 4n)
- Communications of Frederick I. In 1189, early in the Third Crusade, Holy Roman Emperor Frederick I wrote to Leopold V of Austria and received from Sibylla of Jerusalem letters regarding the emperor Isaac II Angelos' dealings with Saladin. He also wrote to Saladin demanding return of Jerusalem, as recounted in Gesta Henrici Regis Secundi. Saladin's response offered Frankish prisoner release and restoration of Latin abbeys in the Holy Land. While crossing Bulgaria in the fall of 1189, Frederick I sent a letter to his son Henry VI of Germany concerning his problems with the emperor. The letter is included in Ansbert's Historia. (Runciman (1954), pp. 11–13)
- Epistolae Cantuarenses. Epistolae Cantuarenses include letters of the archbishops of Canterbury Baldwin of Forde and Hubert Walter of the later 12th century discussing the relationship with the Canterbury Cathedral and Baldwin's travel to the Holy Land in 1190. It includes a letter concerning the deaths of Sibylla of Jerusalem and her daughters. (Rolls Series, Runciman (1954), pp. 30, 495)
- Letters between Richard I and Saladin. In October 1191, Richard I of England and Saladin exchanged letters in an attempt to negotiate peace between the Crusaders and Ayyubids, as reported by Baha ad-Din ibn Shaddad's biography of the sultan. (Runciman (1954), pp. 58–59)
- Communications of Innocent III. After the Partitio terrarum imperii Romaniae in 1204, Innocent III exchanged letters with Baldwin I, Latin Emperor, on the status of Constantinople. The letter to him from the Greek clergy about the pillaging in the city is found in Cotelerius' Ecclesiæ Græcæ Monumenta. He also wrote to Aymar the Monk, Latin Patriarch of Jerusalem, on the marriage of Amalric I to Isabella of Jerusalem in 1198. (MPL 214 [Epistolae], RHF Vol XVIII, Runciman (1954), pp. 93n, 123n, 128, 495, 498)
- Regestum Innocentii III Papae. Regestum Innocentii III Papae super Negotio Romani Imperii provides the regesta, including papal letters and other documents, of Innocent III from 1098–1216. The pope purposely left most of his correspondence with Philip of Swabia out of the official register, adding selected ones after Philip's assassination in 1208. (Runciman (1954), pp. 112n, 494)
- Letters on the Sixth Crusade. After the retaking of Jerusalem in the Sixth Crusade in 1229, the event was seen from different viewpoints in the letters of Frederick II to Henry III of England and that of Gerold of Lausanne, Patriarch of Jerusalem, to the faithful. (Rolls Series, Runciman (1954), pp. 189–191)
- Insights on the Seventh Crusade. After the siege of Damietta in 1249, a knight named Guy in service of Louis IX of France during the Seventh Crusade wrote of the siege to his half-brother, providing a unique insight into the conflict.
- Letters from Jean Pierre Sarrasin. Jean Pierre Sarrasin (died 1275) was chamberlain to Louis IX of France. He published his Lettres françaises du XIIIe siècle. (Letters from the Seventh Crusade).
- Letter from Acre to Charles I of Anjou. In May 1260, the government of Acre sent the Lettre des Chrétiens de Terre Sainte à Charles d'Anjou to Charles I of Anjou warning of the Mongol invasion and requesting help. (ROL, Vol II, (Runciman (1954), pp. 307, 496)
- Letter from Joseph of Chauncy to Edward I. Following the Second Battle of Homs in 1281, Joseph of Chauncy, Prior of the English Hospitallers, wrote to Edward I of England concerning the activities of Hugh I of Jerusalem and Bohemond VII of Antioch. (PPTS V.5, Runciman (1954), pp. 392, 495)
- Letter from Jean de Villiers. Jean de Villiers, Grand Master of the Hospitallers, wrote a letter to Europe following the siege of Acre in 1291 trying to explain the loss of the city to the Mamluks. The letter recounts the story of Hospitaller Marshall Matthew of Clermont, who leapt into the midst of the Mamluks causing them to flee like "sheep from wolves." This story is also told in De Excidio Urbis Acconis, Thaddeus of Naples' Hystoria de desolacione civitatis Acconensis, and Gestes des Chiprois.

=== Genealogical studies ===
The genealogy of the ruling classes of Christians and Muslims in the Holy Land during the Crusades period is summarized below (refer to Vassals of the Kingdom of Jerusalem and Islamic Dynasties). Runciman's Volume II, Appendix III and Volume III, Appendix III provide the genealogical trees of the major families. Specific reference documents include the following.

- Lineages of Outremer. Lignages d'Outremer is a genealogical study laying out the pedigrees of prominent Crusader families written in 1270. The Lignages traces fifteen noble families of Outremer and Cyprus that descended from Guy and Stephanie of Milly, parents of Philip of Milly. (RHC Lois, Volume 2, Appendix III,
- Les familles d'outremer is an unpublished work by French philologist and historian Charles du Fresne, sieur du Cange (1610–1688). A genealogy of the prominent families of the Kingdom of Jerusalem through 1244, including those of the Knights Templar, Knights Hospitaller and Teutonic Order. The publication and completion of Du Cange's unfinished work was entrusted to N. R. Taranne. After the latter's death it was continued by E. G. Rey (1869).
- Genealogy of Godfrey of Bouillon. The genealogy of Godfrey of Bouillon is provided by Genalogia Comitum Buloniensium and in three Beatæ Idæ Vita about Godfrey's mother Ida of Lorraine (Acta Santcorum, 13 April) (MPL 155, Aa. Ss. 11, RHF 14)
- The Mohammedan Dynasties. The Mohammedan Dynasties: Chronological and Genealogical Tables with Historical Introductions (1894) by British orientalist and archaeologist Stanley E. Lane-Poole (1854–1931). Includes the dynasties of Egypt, the Levant, Persia, Afghanistan and the Mongols.
- The New Islamic Dynasties. Clifford E. Bosworth's work The New Islamic Dynasties: A Chronological and Genealogical Handbook provides complete lists of original sources for the dynasties relevant to the Crusades, including the Abbasid, Fatimid, Ayyubid, Mamluk and Seljuk caliphates, sultanates and khanates.

Additional genealogical sources. Additional sources for historical materials include Historiens orientaux from RHC whose Introduction provides detailed genealogies for the caliphates and sultanates active during the Crusades. Additional material on the Artuqids is found in the works of ibn al-Azraq al-Fariqi and the Seljuks from 1070 to 1154 in Taef Kamal El-Azhari's work The Seljuks of Syria during the Crusades. The discussion in Documents arméniens of RHC also includes information on the genealogy of the Armenian leaders. Thiou of Morigny's Chronicon Mauriniacense includes the genealogy of the houses of Montlhéry and Le Puiset, families with strong ties to the Crusader armies and the kingdom.

=== Archaeological studies ===
Archaeological exploration has contributed to the understanding of the history of the Crusades by verifying or refuting accounts presented in original sources. Particular emphasis has been on Crusader castles, history of the art of the period, and document analysis techniques such as palaeography, diplomatics and epigraphy. Some of the more important researchers and the work are

- Emmanuel Guillaume-Rey (1837–1913) was a French archaeologist, topographer and orientalist who wrote seminal works on the archaeology of the Holy Land including Etudes sur les monuments de l'architecture militaire des croisés (1871), Étude historique et topographique de la tribu de Juda (1862) and Étude sur la topographie de la ville d'Acre au XIIIe siècle (1879).
- Max van Berchem (1863–1921) was a Swiss epigraphist and historian whose work includes Matériaux pour un Corpus Inscriptionum Arabicarum (1894) and Epigraphie des Assassins de Syrie (1897). He was the pioneer in the use of Arabic inscriptions in historical analysis.
- Jean Mabillon (1632–1707) was a Benedictine monk who wrote De re diplomatica, an analysis of medieval documents and manuscripts back to the early 7th century that formed the foundational work for the fields of palaeography and diplomatics. He also wrote Acta Ordinis Sancti Benedicti, a collection of the lives of the Benedictine saints.
- Bernard de Montfaucon (1655–1741) was a Benedictine monk and scholar who is considered one of the founders of archaeology and palaeography. He wrote L'antiquité expliquée et représentée en figures (Antiquity Explained and Represented in Diagrams) and Bibliotheca Coisliniana, an examination of ancient and medieval Greek writings. (Runciman (1951), p. 343)
- Abd al-Latif al-Baghdadi (1162–1231) was an Arab physician, historian and traveler who wrote numerous works including Account of Egypt in two parts that is an early work on archaeology and Egyptology. His work was discovered by English orientalist Edward Pococke. Abd al-Latif's autobiography is found in Historiens orientaux. (RHC Or., Volume 3)
- Dame Kathleen Mary Kenyon (1906–1978) was a British archaeologist of Neolithic culture in the Fertile Crescent, one of the most influential archeologists of the 20th century. Among her dozens of published works is Archaeology in the Holy Land (1960).
- Moshe Sharon (b. 1937) is an Israeli historian whose Corpus Inscriptionum Arabicarum Palaestinae, published beginning in 1997, provides the epigraphy of the Holy Land relating to construction, dedication, religious endowments, epitaphs, Quranic texts, prayers and invocations. His work has been instrumental in the continued analysis of original texts of the Crusades.
- Sheila Blair (b. 1948) is an American scholar of Islamic art who wrote the article Arab Inscriptions in Persia, in Epigraphy (Encyclopædia Iranica, 1998) and Būyid Art and Architecture (Encyclopedia of Islam, 3rd ed., 2009)
- Hugh Kennedy (b. 1947) is a British historian whose Crusader Castles (1994) is an account of the history and architecture of Crusader castles in the Kingdom of Jerusalem, County of Tripoli and Principality of Antioch between 1099 and 1291.
- David Nicolle (b. 1944) is a British historian specializing in the military history of the Middle East. His Crusader Castles in the Holy Land, 1192–1302 (2005) examines the early fortifications erected by the Crusaders in Israel, the Palestinian territories, Jordan, Lebanon, Syria and Turkey.
- Denys Pringle (b. 1951) is a British archaeologist and medievalist whose work Secular Buildings in the Crusader Kingdom of Jerusalem: An Archaeological Gazeteer (1997) provides descriptive gazetteer of secular buildings (to include industrial sites) known to have existed within the Kingdom of Jerusalem.
- Camille Enlart (1862–1927) was a French archaeologist and art historian who wrote a seminal work L'art gothique et la Renaissance en Chypre (1899) on Crusader-era art.

Archaeological studies of the Middle East during the Crusader period include: Medieval Fortifications in Cilicia (2019) by Dweezil Vandekerckhove, covering Armenian structures from 1198–1375; Unknown Crusader Castles (2001) by Kristian Molin provides a military history of the Holy Land, Armenia, Cyprus and Greece from the First Crusade until 1380.

=== Numismatics and sigillography ===
The disciples of numismatics, the study of coins and other money, and sigillography, the study of seals of Byzantium and the Latin East, play an important role in interpreting histories. The coinage of Outremer that has been studied are the coins of the Kingdom of Jerusalem, the Frankish Syria, and those of the Islamic world, including Frankish imitations. Coins with Latin or Greek inscriptions and include the money the Crusaders took with them (Western European), money they encountered en route (primarily Byzantine) and coins minted in the kingdom. In the Holy Land, the Crusaders encountered monetary systems different than that in Western Europe and Byzantium. The Muslims used gold, silver and copper coinage, and the European also adopted Arabic gold and silver issues. Some researchers in this area include:

- Louis F. de Saulcy. Louis Félicien de Saulcy (1807–1880) was a French historian, numismatist and archaeologist whose study Numismatique des croisades (1847) was a pioneering work on the coins of the Crusader era.
- Gustave Schlumberger. Gustave Schlumberger (1844–1929) was a French historian and numismatist of the Crusades and Byzantine empire. His classic study of coins Numismatique de l'Orient Latin (1878) is the standard reference. His Sigillographie de l'empire byzantin (1884) is a compendium of Byzantine seals. He also wrote Sigillographie de l'Orient latin (1877), with a continuation by Ferdinand Chalandon (1875–1921), on the seals of the Kingdom of Jerusalem and Latin Empire of Constantinople.
- George C. Miles (1904–1975) was an Islamic numismatist whose work Fatimid Coins in the Collection of the University Museum, Philadelphia, cataloged of one major collection with references to previous work in the area.
- Paul Balog. Paul Balog (1900–1982) was an Italian Islamic numismatic and archaeologist. His works include The Coinage of the Ayyubids (1980) and The Coinage of the Mamluk Sultans of Egypt and Syria (1964), both regarded as classic studies in Islamic numismatics. Monnaies à lé genres arabes de l'Orient latin (1958) by Paul Balog and Jacques Yvon (1923–1983) is the standard reference for the classifications of coins in Arabic from the Crusader era.

=== Additional topics ===
Physical phenomena, such as earthquakes and comets, have relevance in the study of history because of their depiction in written sources and correlation with archaeological finds. In the Crusader period, both Western and Arabic sources have described the chronology and impact of these natural phenomena, and the comparative analyses done by modern historians and scientists have played a role in deciphering descriptions of events. In particular, the destruction of the Church of the Holy Sepulchre in 1009 was equated with many calamities including earthquakes (in 1015, 1016) and comets (in 1029).

- Scientific Disciplines. Archaeoseismology, the study of earthquakes' impact in archaeology, has a similar role in history in the correlation between scientific results as compared to historical documents. Numerous sources for the Crusades provide information on associated physical phenomena. Similarly, the observational history of comets and of solar eclipses can be useful in supporting or refuting suppositions in medieval texts.
- Earthquakes. Examples of earthquakes that have been noted in Crusader historical sources including Latin historians Fulcher of Chartres, Walter the Chronicler and William of Tyre, Syriac sources Michael the Syrian and the 1224 Chronicle, and Arab historians including ibn Qalanisi, Abu Shama, ibn al-Athir (who identified 25 earthquakes in his works), and ibn al-Jawzi. Significant events include the 1114 Syrian earthquake, the 1138 Aleppo earthquake, the 1157 Hama earthquake, the 1170 Syrian earthquake, the 1202 Syrian earthquake, and the 1287 earthquake that damaged the walls of Lattakieh.
- Comets and Meteors. The observations of comets and meteors in medieval histories includes both the physical and temporal traits of the objects as well as their view as portents of good or bad luck. The most famous of these is Haley's Comet appearing in 1066 prior to the Battle of Hastings, recorded in the Anglo-Saxon Chronicleamong other sources. Other known sightings of comets are in 1097, 1105-1106 and 1110, and meteor storms in 1063 and 1193, as recorded by ibn Qalanisi, ibn al-Athir and others. Speculation that a sighting of the 1222 apparition of Haley's Comet, recorded by ibn al-Athir, may have caused Genghis Khan's invasion of the west are unfounded.
- Solar and Lunar Eclipses. Solar eclipses and lunar eclipses were recorded in numerous historical texts including that of ibn al-Jawzi, ibn al-Athir and Michael the Syrian. Noted solar eclipses are those in 1061, 1176 and 1283, and lunar eclipses recorded in 1117 and 1226. (Runciman (1952), pp. 105, 463)
- Nicholas Ambraseys. Nicholas Ambraseys (1929–2012) was a Greek seismologist who was a pioneer in the study of medieval earthquakes in the Middle East. His 2004 study The 12th century seismic paroxysm in the Middle East: a historical perspective is most relevant to Crusader studies. He also wrote A history of Persian earthquakes (1982) and Seismicity of Egypt, Arabia and the Red Sea (1994).
- Al-Trabulsy. Hussain al-Trabulsy is a Saudi physicist and astronomer whose work Investigation of some astronomical phenomena in medieval Arabic chronicles is a study of Islamic observations and calculation of comets, meteors and meteor showers, and solar and lunar eclipses in the Middle Ages.
- Johannes de Sacrobosco. Johannes de Sacrobosco (c. 1195 – c. 1256) was a medieval scholar and astronomer who wrote his De sphaera mundi (The Sphere of the Cosmos or Tractatus de sphaera) around 1230. He is still called by the name John of Holywood, a name which was constructed by post-hoc reverse translation of the Latin sacro bosco,
- Al-Wabkanawi. Shams al-Munajjim Muhammad ibn Ali al-Wabkanawi was a 14th century Persian astronomer whose work al‐Zīj al‐muḥaqqaq is an astronomical handbook based on observations made at the Maragheh observatory established in 1259 by Persian polymath Nasir al-Din al-Tusi (1201-1274). Among his accomplishments was the calculation of the solar eclipse of 30 January 1283.

== See also ==
- Art of the Crusades
- Crusade Texts in Translation
- Crusader States
- Islamic view on the Crusades
- List of Crusader Castles
- Military History of the Crusader States
- Military Orders of the Crusades
- Recovery of the Holy Land
- Travelogues of Palestine
