= Thaddeus =

- Pronunciation: /θæˈdiːəs, ˈθædi-/
- Gender: Male
- Language: Aramaic

Other names
- Alternative spelling: Thaddaeus
- Nicknames: Thad; Thady; Tad; Ted; Teddy; Todd; Toddy; See hypocorisms for more
- Related names: Tadeusz; Taddei; Tadeo; Tadeu; Taddeo; Tadas; Tadei; Tadey; Faddey

Thaddeus (Latin: Thaddaeus, Ancient Greek: Θαδδαῖος, romanized: Thaddaîos, from Imperial Aramaic: תדי, romanized: Ṯaday) is a masculine given name.

As of the 1990 Census, Thaddeus was the 611th most popular male name in the United States, while Thad, its diminutive version, was the 846th.

== Alternate forms ==
- Taco – Dutch
- Tadeu (ind. Tade) – Albanian
- Թադէոս ("Tadeos"), Թադևոս ("Tadevos"), Թաթոս ("Tatos") – Armenian
- Tadija – Croatian
- Tadeáš – Czech
- Thaddée – French
- თადეოზი (tadeozi) Georgian
- Thaddäus – German
- Tádé – Hungarian
- Tadáias (Biblical), Tadhg (given name) – Irish
- Taddeo – Italian
- Taddeus (Biblical; old translation), Taday (modern translation) – Turkish
- Tadejs – Latvian
- Tadas – Lithuanian
- Тадеј (Tadej) – Macedonian
- Thadhewoos – Malayalam
- Tadeusz – Polish
- Tadeu – Portuguese
- Тадэвуш (Tadevuš) – Belarusian
- Фаддей ("Faddey") or Фадей ("Fadey") – Russian
- Тадей ("Тadey") – Ukrainian
- Тадеј (Tadej), Тадија (Tadija) – Serbian
- Tadej – Slovenian
- Tadeo – Spanish
- Tadewos – Amharic
- ததேயு (Thathéyu/Dhathéyu) – Tamil

== Biblical figures ==
- Thaddaeus, usually identified as Jude the Apostle, one of the Twelve Apostles of Jesus
- Thaddeus of Edessa, one of the Seventy Disciples

== Orthodox saints ==
References:'

- Apostle Jude son of James (Lebbaeus, Thaddeus), brother of Jesus,
- Thaddeus of Edessa, one of the Seventy Disciples, bishop of Beirut,
- Venerable Thaddeus of Lukh,
- New Hieromartyr Archbishop Thaddeus (Uspensky) of Tver,
- Venerable Thaddeus of Stepantsminda
- Venerable Thaddeus the Confessor of the Studion

== People ==
=== Thaddeus ===
- Thaddeus of Naples (fl. 1291), crusade chronicler
- Thaddeus (bishop of Caffa), 14th-century Armenian Catholic friar and bishop
- Thaddeus Bowman (1712–1806), American soldier in Revolutionary War
- Thaddeus Bullard, American professional wrestler better known as Titus O'Neil
- Thaddeus Cahill (1867–1934), American inventor of the telharmonium
- Thaddeus von Clegg, German-American clockmaker
- Thaddeus P. Dryja, American ophthalmologist and geneticist
- Thaddeus Grauer, Austrian art dealer
- Thaddeus William Harris (1795–1856), American entomologist, botanist and librarian
- Thaddäus Huber (1742–1798), Austrian violinist and composer
- Thaddeus B. Hurd, American architect and amateur historian
- Thaddeus Kirkland (born 1955), American politician
- Thaddeus Kosciuszko, Polish general in the American Revolution
- Thaddeus S. C. Lowe (1831–1913), American Civil War scientist and inventor
- Thaddeus Matthews (1958–2025), American pastor and broadcaster
- Thaddeus McCotter (born 1965), American politician
- Thaddeus Moss (born 1998), American football player
- Thaddeus O'Sullivan (born 1947), Irish film director, cinematographer, and screenwriter
- Ari Thaddeus Pilichowski, 20th-century French-British linguist and conference interpreter, better known as Teddy Pilley
- Thaddeus Coleman Pound (1833–1914), Lieutenant Governor of Wisconsin and grandfather of Ezra Pound
- Thaddeus Stevens (1792–1868), leader of the Radical Republicans during the American Civil War and Reconstruction
- Thaddeus Ward (born 1997), American baseball player
- Thaddäus Weigl (1776–1844), Austrian composer and music publisher
- Thaddeus A. Wood (1852–1936), American politician and Mississippi state senator
- Thaddeus Young, American basketball player for the Toronto Raptors
- Thaddeus Joy, boat captain of "Seneca Chief" on Erie Canal.

=== Thad ===
- Thad Jones (1923–1986), American jazz trumpeter and bandleader
- Thad Lewis (born 1987), American National Football League quarterback
- Thad Luckinbill, American actor on the soap opera The Young and the Restless
- Thad Starner, American computer scientist, professor at the Georgia Institute of Technology College of Computing, technical lead of Google Glass

== Fictional characters ==
- General Thaddeus E. "Thunderbolt" Ross, Marvel Comics character, mainly an antagonist of Hulk
- Agent John Thaddeus Myers, character in Hellboy (2004) by Guillermo Del Toro
- Doctor Thaddeus Bodog Sivana, DC Comics character, an antagonist of Captain Marvel
- Thaddeus Mcann, character in the novel Bog Child by Siobhab Dowd
- Thaddeus Sholto, character in The Sign of the Four by Sir Arthur Conan Doyle
- Tadzio, character in the film and novella Death in Venice by Thomas Mann
- Thaddeus Beaumont in The Dark Half by Stephen King
- Tadeus, character in "Requiem: a Halucination" by Antonio Tabucchi
- Thaddeus Caractacus Evillard "Pecker" Bird, major character in The Starbuck Chronicles by Bernard Cornwell
- "The Chief" in the CONTROL spy agency in Get Smart
- Thaddeus Thatch, paternal grandfather of Milo James Thatch in Atlantis: The Lost Empire
- Thaddeus Bile, a character in the 2001 Disney/Pixar animated film Monsters, Inc.
- Thaddeus, character in the film Your Highness
- Dr. Thaddeus Morocco, an antagonist in the animated series Transformers: Rescue Bots
- Thad Castle, on television series Blue Mountain State
- Thaddeus "Rusty" Venture, on the animated series The Venture Bros.
- Thaddeus Bradley, in the movie Now You See Me
- Brother Thaddeus, in the film Heaven Help Us
- Lieutenant/Captain Thaddeus Harris in the film Police Academy
- Captain Thadeus, of the Osiris, in the Final Flight of the Osiris in The Animatrix
- Dr. Thaddius Blakk, the main antagonist in the animated series Slugterra

== See also ==
- Addai
- Taddei
- Tadeo Gomez, an American musician
