= Tadeu =

Tadeu may refer to:

- José Tadeu Carneiro Cardoso (born 1956), aka Mestre Camisa, Capoeira master who created the organization ABADÁ-Capoeira
- Tadeu Hasdeu or Bogdan Petriceicu Hasdeu (1838–1907), Romanian writer and philologist
- Tadeu Jesus Nogueira, Jr. (born 1981), Brazilian footballer commonly known as Juninho
- Tadeu Jungle (born 1956), Brazilian multimedia artist
- Tadeu (footballer, born 1986), full name José Tadeu Mouro Júnior, Brazilian football forward
- Tadeu (footballer, born 1992), full name Tadeu Antônio Ferreira, Brazilian football goalkeeper
- Ely Tadeu Bravin Rangel (born 1982), Brazilian football forward commonly known as Ely Thadeu
- Tadeu Schmidt, host of Fantástico, a Brazilian weekly television newsmagazine
- Gilmar Tadeu da Silva (born 1970), Brazilian football manager and former football player commonly known as Gil Paulista
- Ygor Tadeu De Souza (born 1986), Brazilian striker who has recently played for Chengdu Blades in the China League One
- Tarcisio Tadeu Spricigo, Brazilian Roman Catholic priest jailed for 14 years for sexual abuse of children
- Eugenio Tadeu, Brazilian grappler, Vale Tudo and mixed martial arts fighter
- Tadeu Terra (born 1986), Brazilian footballer who is currently without a club

== Etymology ==
Tadeu is the equivalent form of the Aramic name Thaddeus in both Catalan and Portuguese languages.

== See also ==
- Esporte Clube São Judas Tadeu, Brazilian men's and women's football club based in Jaguariúna, São Paulo state
- Universidade São Judas Tadeu (USJT), a Brazilian private, for-profit university based in São Paulo
- Tadateru
- Tadeusz (disambiguation)
- Tardieu (disambiguation)
