= Taddeo =

Taddeo is a masculine given name which may refer to:

- Taddeo Alderotti (between 1206 and 1215–1295), Italian doctor and professor of medicine
- Taddeo Altini O.S.A. (1609–1685), Roman Catholic Bishop of Civita Castellana e Orte, and Titular Bishop of Porphyreon
- Taddeo Barberini (1603–1647), Italian nobleman, Prince of Palestrina, nephew of Pope Urban VIII, Gonfalonier of the Church and commander of the Papal Army
- Taddeo Carlone (died 1613), Swiss-Italian sculptor and architect
- Taddeo Crivelli (fl. 1451, died by 1479), also known as Taddeo da Ferrara, painter of illuminated manuscripts
- Taddeo d'Este (c. 1390–1448), condottiere (mercenary leader) almost exclusively in the service of the Republic of Venice
- Taddeo da Suessa (1190/1200–1248), Italian jurist
- Taddeo di Bartolo, Sienese painter active up to 1422
- Taddeo Gaddi (c. 1300–1366), Italian painter
- Taddeo Gaddi (cardinal) (1520–1561), Italian Roman Catholic cardinal and bishop
- Taddeo Kuntze, Taddeo Polacco and Tadeusz Kuntze, pseudonyms of the Silesian painter Tadeusz Konicz (1733–1793)
- Taddeo Landini (c. 1561–1596), Italian sculptor and architect
- Taddeo Luigi dal Verme (1641–1717), Roman Catholic cardinal
- Taddeo Lwanga (born 1994), Ugandan footballer
- Taddeo Manfredi (1431–c. 1486), Lord of Imola from 1448 until 1473 and a condottiere (mercenary leader)
- Taddeo Orlando (1885–1950), Italian general
- Taddeo Pepoli (died 1549), Roman Catholic Bishop of Carinola, and of Cariati e Cerenzia
- Taddeo Sarti (1540–1617), Roman Catholic Bishop of Nepi e Sutri
- Taddeo da Suessa or da Sessa (c. 1190/1200–1248), Italian jurist
- Taddeo Zuccari or Zuccaro (1529–1566), Italian painter

== See also ==
- Gianfranco de Taddeo (1928–2025), Swiss footballer

== See also ==
- Tadeusz (disambiguation)
- Thaddeus
