= Leonardo's robot =

Automaton designed by Leonardo da Vinci

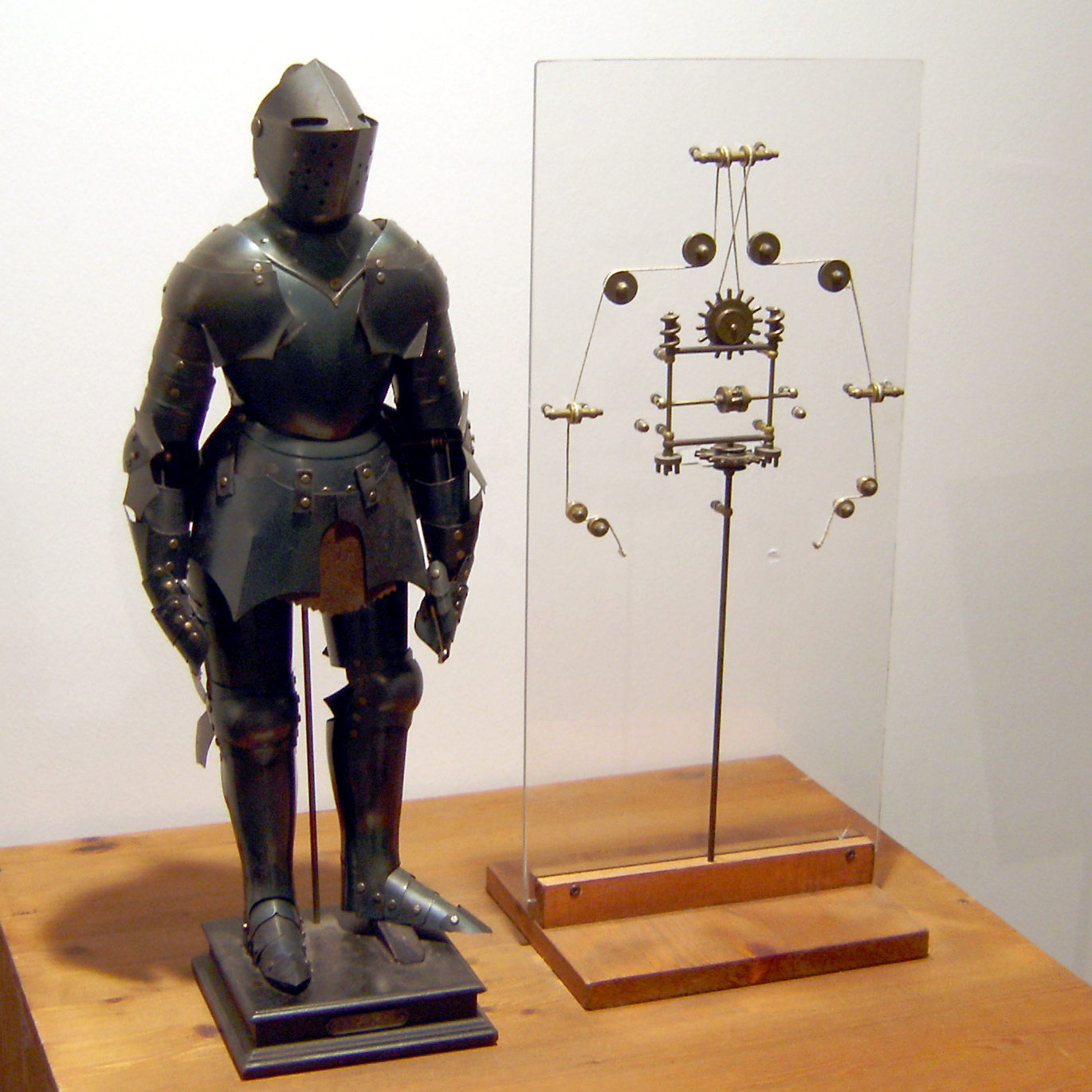
Model of Leonardo's robot with inner workings, on display in Berlin

Leonardo's robot, or Leonardo's mechanical knight (Italian: Automa cavaliere, lit. "Automaton knight"), is a humanoid automaton designed and possibly constructed by Leonardo da Vinci in the late 15th century.

The robot's design largely consists of a series of pulleys that allow it to mimic human movements. Operational versions of the robot have been reconstructed by multiple researchers after the discovery of Leonardo's sketches in the 1950s. Leonardo's designs may have served as inspirations for robotics projects backed by NASA and Intuitive Surgical.

== History ==
Leonardo possibly started sketching ideas for his robot before he began work on The Last Supper. Though no complete drawings of the automaton survived, Leonardo's notes suggest he may have constructed a prototype around 1495, while he was under the patronage of Ludovico Sforza, the Duke of Milan.

Leonardo's initial studies in anatomy and kinesiology, as recorded in his Codex Huygens, may have informed his desire to design an automated device. The principles of his humanoid robot can be found among a set of folios composed of anatomical sketches that are believed to follow his Vitruvian Canon of Proportions.

Leonardo's interest in engineering may have also inspired him to create his automaton, which appears in the form of a mechanical knight. Before Leonardo designed his mechanical knight, eyewitness accounts detail how he created a mechanical lion that could move independently of human intervention. The mechanical lion was displayed in many public venues including the wedding of Maria de Medici and at the arrival of the French King Francis I in Lyon in 1515.

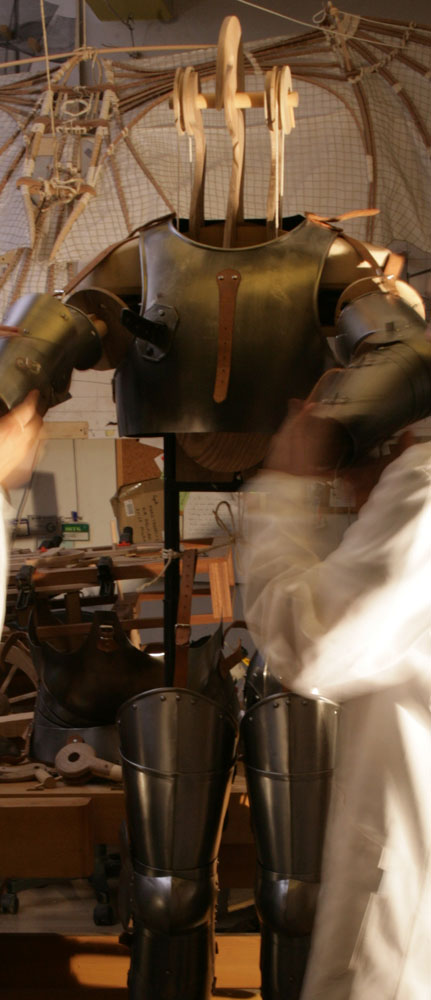
A modern reconstruction of the robot of Leonardo da Vinci in the Leonardo3 laboratories, in 2007

== Design ==
Leonardo's robot is largely controlled by a system of pulleys composed of a central driver, individual drivers, and supporting idler pulleys. The inside of the robot's chest contains a mechanical controller for the arms. This controller triggers the worm gears connected to the robot's pulley system, enabling the robot to wave its arms. The robot's legs are controlled with an external crank and cable system attached to key pivots on the ankles, knees, and hips. The robot's inner mechanisms are hidden behind a German-Italian suit of medieval armor.

The robot's head has a hinged jaw and is attached to a flexible neck. The robot's body can sit upright and move its arms around in various directions. The robot's lower body operates with three degrees of freedom while the arms utilize a four-degree-of-freedom system, possibly so the robot can perform whole-arm grasping.

Drums located inside of the robot produce sounds as the rest of the body moves. Like many other mechanical forms of palatial entertainment at the time, the robot may have been designed to scare audiences.

== Modern reconstructions ==
Around the 1950s, researcher Carlo Pedretti discovered sketchbooks containing Leonardo's notes on the mechanical knight, with numerous fragmented sketches and design details scattered across various pages.

After meeting Pedretti in 1993, roboticist Mark Rosheim collaborated with him to piece together the fragmented sketches and develop a CAD reconstruction of the robot.

In 2002, the BBC filmed Rosheim reconstructing Leonardo's robot. Rosheim combined his own designs with Leonardo's preliminary sketches for his reconstruction. He also used a photo of Renaissance armor to plan the exterior of the robot and ensure that all of the robot's fragments aligned. To account for the compressed filming schedule of two weeks, Rosheim simplified the design and used a stock suit of armor.

In 2007, Mario Taddei, technical director and researcher at the Leonardo3 (L3) research center and museum in Milan, also reconstructed Leonardo's robot. Both Taddei and Rosheim's reconstructions were operational.

== Legacy ==
NASA commissioned Mark Rosheim to design an advanced humanoid robot called Surrogate and nicknamed "Surge". Rosheim drew inspiration from Leonardo's robotic designs, integrating principles from Leonardo's exploration of human-like movement and mechanical function into Surge's design.

Intuitive Surgical launched the first da Vinci Surgical System in 2000. It is believed that the robotic-assisted surgical system was named after Leonardo da Vinci as an homage to his contributions to the fields of human anatomy, mechanics, and automation. Some also argue that the name of the surgical system commemorates how Leonardo's robot appears to be the first human automaton to prove that the mechanisms in human bodies could be replicated using machinery.
