= Addai (given name) =

- Pronunciation: Classical Syriac: [ʔaddaj], Assyrian Neo-Aramaic: [ʔaːdiː]
- Gender: Masculine

Origin
- Origin: Classical Syriac: ܐܕܝ (Addai)
- Meaning: Thaddeus

Addai (Syriac: ܐܕܝ) is a Syriac given name, equivalent to the Greek and Latin Thaddeus (Greek: Θαδδαῖος). It may refer to:

- Addai I, also known as Thaddeus of Edessa (1st/2nd century AD), saint and evangelist of Edessa
- Addai II Giwargis, patriarch of the Ancient Church of the East since 1970
- Addai Scher (1867–1915), the Chaldean Catholic archbishop of Siirt

== Theology ==
- Doctrine of Addai, book containing the purported teachings of Thaddeus of Edessa
- Liturgy of Addai and Mari, East Syriac liturgy named after Thaddeus of Edessa
- Qudasha of Saints Addai and Mari in the Holy Qurbana

== See also ==
- Addai (surname)
- Thaddeus
