= Tardieu =

Tardieu may refer to:

- Ambroise Tardieu (1788–1841) French engraver and cartographer.
- André Tardieu (1876–1945), three times Prime Minister of France (between 1929 and 1932)
- Auguste Ambroise Tardieu (1818–1879), forensic medical scientist of the mid 19th century; President of the French Academy of Medicine, Dean of the Faculty of Medicine and Professor of Legal Medicine at the University of Paris
- Carine Tardieu (born 1973), French filmmaker
- Charlotte Tardieu (1829-1890), French composer
- Élisabeth-Claire Tardieu (1731-1773), French engraver
- Jacques-Nicolas Tardieu (1716–1791), French engraver
- Jean Tardieu (1903–1995), French artist, musician, poet and dramatic author
- Jean-Charles Tardieu (1765–1830), French painter
- Jerry Tardieu (born 1967), Haitian congressman
- Pierre François Tardieu (1711–1771), French engraver and cartographer.
- Marie-Anne Tardieu (1732–1826), married name of Marie-Anne Rousselet, French engraver
- Marie Laure Tardieu (1902–1998), French botanist
- Michel Tardieu (born 1938), French scholar
- Nicolas-Henri Tardieu (1674–1749), French engraver
- Pierre Alexandre Tardieu (1756-1844), French engraver
