= Tancrède (tragedy) =

1760 tragedy in five acts by Voltaire

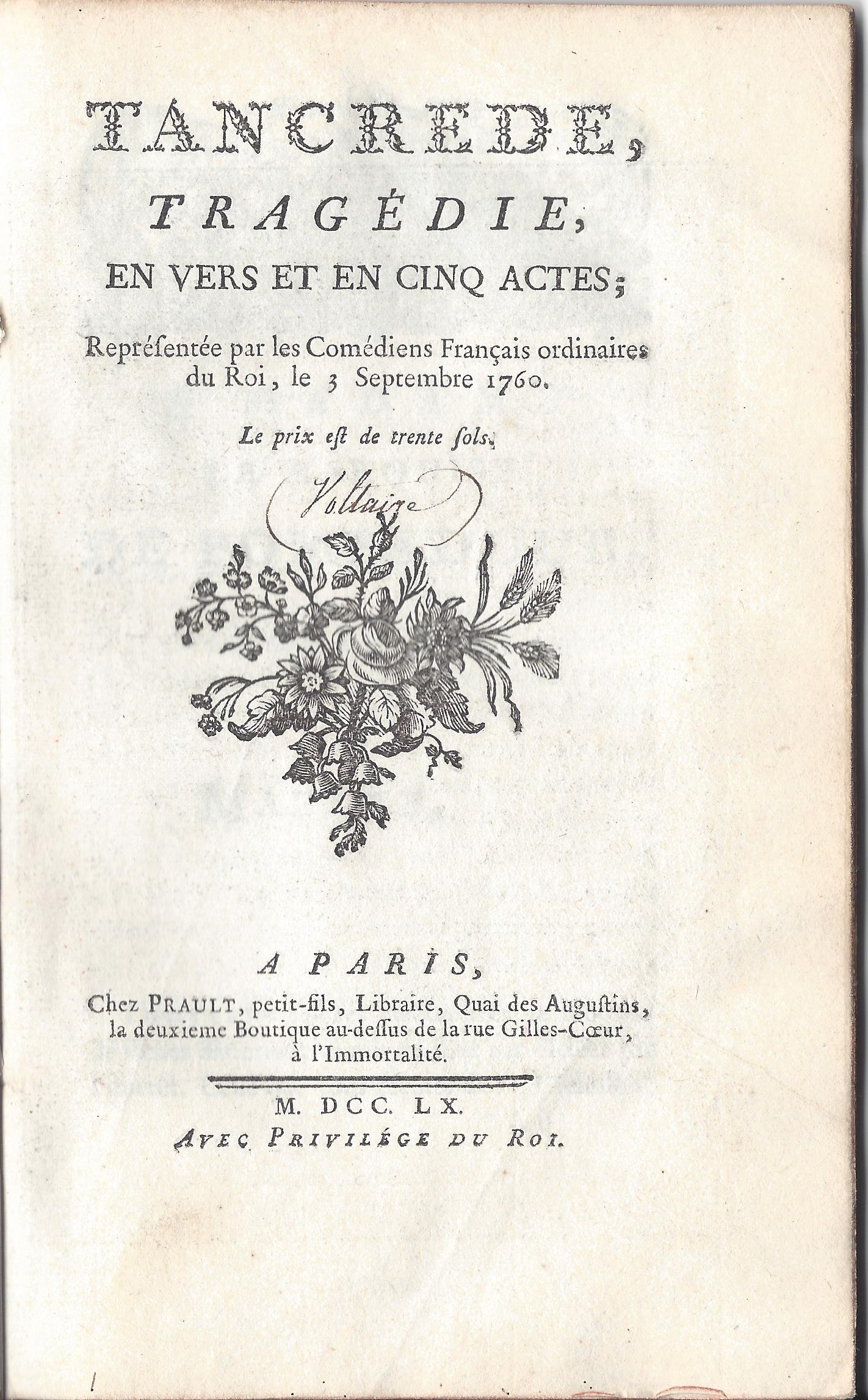
Tancrède, first (Prault) edition, Paris 1760

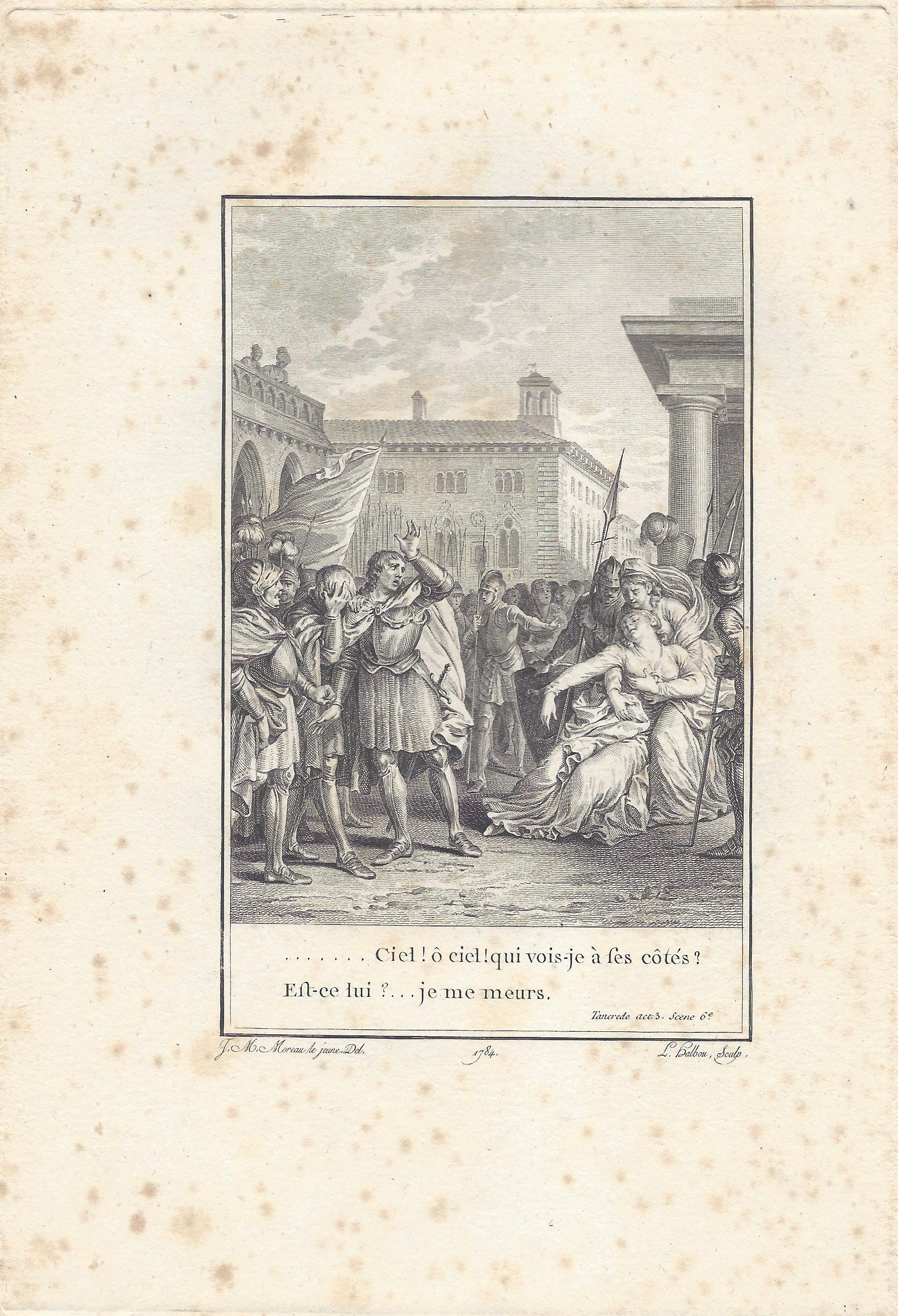
Jean-Michel Moreau: Illustration of Tancrède 1784

Tancrède is a tragedy in five acts by Voltaire that premiered on 3 September 1760.

== Plot ==
The character names Tancrède and Aménaïde are taken from Torquato Tasso's Jerusalem Delivered, but the plot does not owe anything to this work. The action takes place in the year 1105 in Norman-ruled Syracuse at the time Sicily was throwing off the rule of the Saracens. Aménaïde, daughter of Argire, is betrothed to Orbassan. However she loves Tancrède, who has gone into hiding after being placed under Imperial ban at the initiative of Orbassan. A letter from Aménaïde to Tancrède is intercepted and falsely said to be intended for the Saracen Solamir; she is then held prisoner until she can be tried. Tancrède, thinking he has been deceived by Aménaïde, seeks death in an attack on Solamir, whom he kills. As Tancrède too dies, Aménaïde declares her innocence and her love before escaping her father and dying of a broken heart next to Tancrède's body.

== Composition ==
In 1759 there was a change in the practices of the Comédie-Française which Voltaire had long advocated - the removal of rows of spectators from the stage. This meant that for the first time the full width of the stage could be used; a grander spectacle could be presented, with more action in each scene. This change prompted Voltaire to write a drama that would take full advantage of these new performance conditions, creating an elaborate visual spectacle. Together with his emphasis on action rather than intense exploration of character, the play produced a somewhat operatic effect. Voltaire began work on the play in 1759 and claimed to have written it in just four weeks.

Tancrède was a departure from some of the other norms of French tragedy established by Racine. Until 1760 all of Voltaire's tragedies had been written in rhyming Alexandrine couplets, the normal form of dramatic poetry in the French theatre of the time. Tancrède however was written in 'vers croisés' which gave the language a somewhat more natural and less declamatory quality. Voltaire also concentrated on filling the action with pathos, tenderness and chivalric sentiment. When Jean-François Marmontel visited Ferney before the manuscript was sent to the actors in Paris, Voltaire gave him a copy to read. When he returned it Voltaire said to him 'your tears tell me eloquently what I most desired to know.' As well as for its moving action, the play was noted for some particular instances of realism unusual at the time. For example, after being arrested Aménaïde appeared on stage in fetters, and Tancrède actually threw down a gauntlet when he challenged Orbassan to combat.

== Performances and critical reception ==
After initial rehearsals in Tournai there was a private performance at Voltaire's house theatre in Ferney in October 1759; following alterations the play had its public premiere on 13 September 1760. The premiere in the Comédie-Française with Lekain in the title role and Claire Clairon as Aménaïde was a success and prompted the creation of two parodies by Antoine-François Riccoboni in the Théâtre-Italien: La nouvelle joute and Quand parlera-t-elle? However as a result of various intrigues the play was taken off the stage after only thirteen performances.

As well as enjoying public success, Tancrède was also appreciated at court. When a play was required for the celebration of the wedding of the dauphin (the future Louis XVI) and Marie Antoinette in 1770, Tancrède was selected and performed. The accession of Louis XVI in 1775 thus offered Voltaire some hope that the court would no longer be so firmly opposed to his return to Paris. While the new king remained implacable however, Marie Antoinette was better disposed towards Voltaire and in 1776 she requested that Lekain perform Tancrède at court once again.

Denis Diderot attended the premier and wrote to Voltaire afterwards with his critical views. He praised many aspects of the play, notably the third act; he admired the scene where Aménaïde faints when she unexpectedly sees Tancrède. He found the mute scene particularly powerful, because the acting alone, he felt, imparted the tragedy more effectively than words could have; it reminded him of Poussin's painting (es) Esther before Ahasuerus. His main criticisms were around the reactions by two characters in the play which did not seem probable to him. The first was in Act 2 when Aménaïde's father Argire appears to have no qualms about agreeing that his daughter is a traitor and readily assenting to her punishment. 'Make him more of a father', he wrote to Voltaire. The other fault he found was in Act 4 where Aménaïde is indignant that Tancrède too is so ready to believe her a traitor; in Diderot's view she should have been able to better appreciate how matters appeared to him. Élie Catherine Fréron also praised the play, welcoming the feelings of chivalry which it inspired and describing it as a new kind of spectacle.

Dorothea Celesia produced an adaptation of Tancrède in English under the title "Almida" which was staged at Drury Lane in 1771. Johann Wolfgang von Goethe published a German translation in 1802 and Gioacchino Rossini made his great international breakthrough with his opera Tancredi in 1813, inspired by Voltaire's tragedy.

== Printed editions ==
The play was printed by Prault in 1760, together with a dedication by Voltaire to Madame de Pompadour, an admirer of Tasso. This dedication secured the assistance of Madame de Pompadour in ensuring that first minister Étienne-François de Choiseul allowed the book to be published. Numerous reprints and pirated prints followed immediately.

- Tancrede, tragédie, en vers et en cinq actes; représentée par les Comédiens franc̜ais ordinaires du Roi, le 3 septembre 1760 Prault, petit fils, Paris 1760, with two copperplates by Pierre François Tardieu
- Tancrede, tragédie, en vers croisés, et en cinq actes; représentée par les Comédiens franc̜ais ordinaires du Roi, le 3 septembre 1760 Prault, petit fils, Paris 1761, 8°, (12)
- Almida, a Tragedy, as It is Performed at the Theatre Royal in Drury-Lane. By a Lady. (London: T. Becket and Co. in the Strand, 1771): free translation of Tancrède by Dorothea Celesia.
- Tancred, translated and edited by Johann Wolfgang von Goethe. Cotta, Tübingen 1802
