= Tadas (name) =

- Gender: Male
- Language: Lithuanian

Origin
- Region of origin: Lithuania

Other names
- Related names: Thaddeus; Tad

Tadas is a Lithuanian masculine given name. It is a cognate of the name Thaddeus and may refer to:

- Tadas Blinda (1846–1877), Lithuanian folk hero of the 19th century
- Tadas Gražiūnas (born 1978), Lithuanian footballer
- Tadas Ivanauskas (1882–1970), Lithuanian zoologist, biologist and a founder of Vytautas Magnus University
- Tadas Kijanskas (born 1985), Lithuanian footballer
- Tadas Klimavičius (born 1982), Lithuanian basketball player
- Tadas Kumeliauskas (born 1990), Lithuanian ice hockey player
- Tadas Labukas (born 1984), Lithuanian footballer
- Tadas Langaitis (born 1977), Lithuanian civic activist and entrepreneur
- Tadas Murnikas (born ????), Lithuanian cyclist and Olympic competitor
- Tadas Papečkys (born 1978), Lithuanian footballer
- Tadas Šuškevičius (born 1985), Lithuanian race-walker and Olympic competitor

As a middle name:

- Linas Tadas Karosas (born 1964), Lithuanian businessman and entrepreneur
