= Thad =

Thad is a masculine given name, often a short form (hypocorism) of Thaddeus. It may refer to:

- Thad Allen (born 1949), United States Coast Guard admiral
- Thad Altman (born 1955), American politician
- Thad Balkman (born 1971), American politician, lawyer, and judge
- Thaddeus Thad Bingel, American educator and political consultant
- Thaddis Thad Bosley (born 1956), American baseball player
- Thaddeus Thad F. Brown (1902–1970), American police chief
- Thad Busby (born 1974), American football player
- Thaddeus Thad Carhart (born 1950), American writer
- Thad Castle, character in the TV series Blue Mountain State
- William Thad Cochran (1937–2019), United States Senator from Mississippi
- Thad Cockrell, American singer-songwriter
- Thaddeus Thad A. Eure (1899–1993), American politician
- Thad McIntosh Guyer (born 1950), American lawyer
- Thad Heartfield (1940–2022), American lawyer and federal judge
- Thaddeus Thad Hutcheson (1915–1986), American attorney and politician
- Thad J. Jakubowski (1924–2013), American Roman Catholic bishop
- Thad Jaracz (born 1946), American basketball player
- Thaddeus Thad Jones (1923–1986), American jazz trumpeter and bandleader
- Thad Krasnesky (fl. 2000s–2020s), American children's author
- Thad Levine (born 1971), American baseball executive
- Thaddeus Thad Lewis (born 1987), American football player
- Thaddeus Thad Luckinbill (born 1975), American actor and film producer
- Thad Matta (born 1967), American men's basketball coach
- Thad McArthur (born 1928), American Olympic modern pentathlete
- Thad McClammy (1942–2021), American politician
- Thaddus Thad McFadden (American football) (born 1962), American football player
- Thaddus Thad McFadden (basketball) (born 1987), American basketball player
- Thaddeus Thad Moffitt (born 2000), American racing driver
- Thaddeus Thad Mumford (1951–2018), American television writer and producer
- Thaddeus Thad Spencer (1943–2013), American heavyweight boxer
- Thad Starner (fl. 1980s–2010s), American computer scientist
- Thaddeus Thad Stem Jr. (1916–1980), American author and poet
- Thaddeus Stevens (1792–1868), United States Representative from Pennsylvania
- Robert Thaddeus R. Thad Taylor (1925–2006), American theatre director
- Thaddeus Thad Tillotson (1940–2012), American baseball pitcher
- Thad Vann (1907–1982), American football player and coach
- Thad Viers (born 1978), American politician
- Thad Vreeland Jr. (1924–2010), American materials scientist
- Thad Weber (born 1984), American baseball pitcher
- Thad, one of the side characters from the webseries Murder Drones (2021-2024)
