= Marco A. López Jr. =

American politician (born 1978)

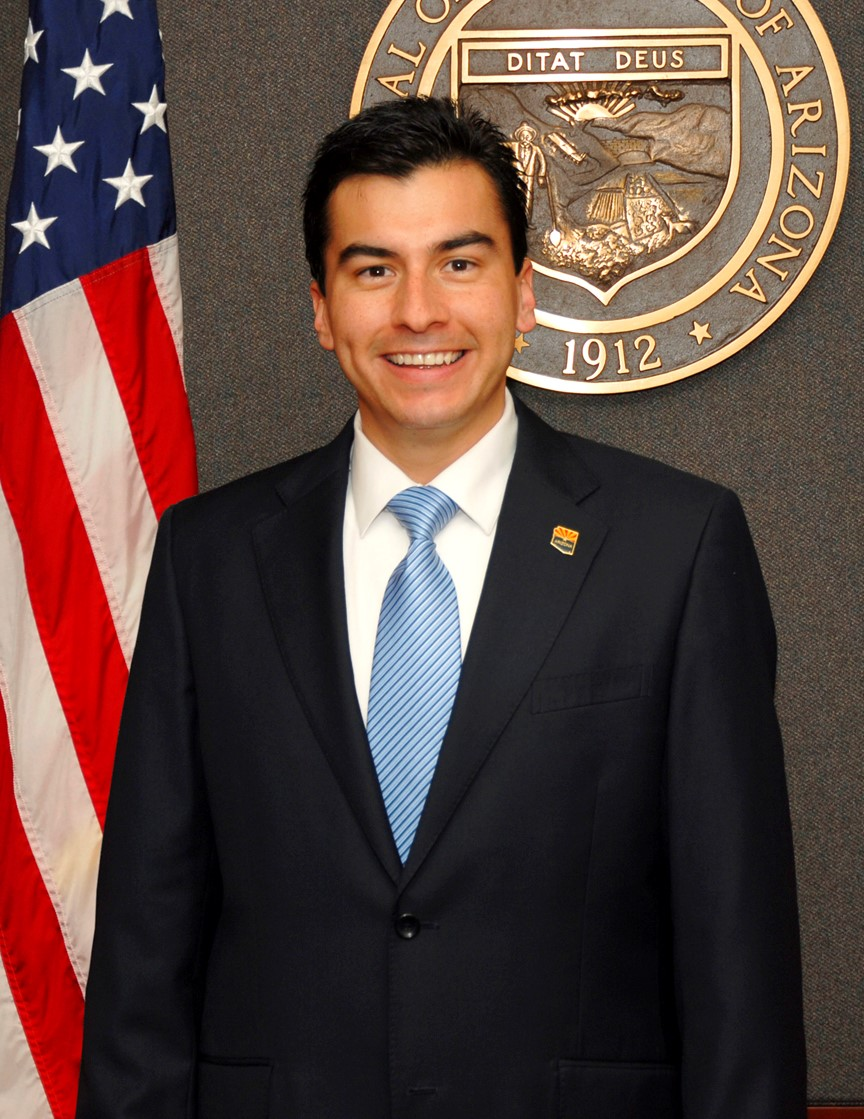

Chief of Staff of U.S. Customs and Border Protection
- In office January 21, 2009 – 2011
- President: Barack Obama
- Preceded by: Thad Bingel

Director of the Arizona Department of Commerce
- In office January 6, 2008 – January 20, 2009
- Governor: Janet Napolitano
- Preceded by: Jan Lesher
- Succeeded by: Kent Ennis (Acting)

Mayor of Nogales, Arizona
- In office 2001–2004
- Preceded by: Cesar G. Rios
- Succeeded by: Albert Kramer

Personal details
- Born: Marco Antonio López Jr. April 7, 1978 (age 46); Nogales, Mexico
- Political party: Democratic
- Education: University of Arizona (BA)

Marco Antonio López Jr. (born April 7, 1978) is an American politician. He has served in both elected and non-elected public offices, including as mayor of Nogales, Arizona, executive director of the Arizona-Mexico Commission, policy advisor to Arizona Governor Janet Napolitano for Mexico and Latin America, and director of the Arizona Department of Commerce. He is best known as a previous chief of staff of United States Customs and Border Protection who served from 2009 to 2011 under CBP Commissioner Alan Bersin, and as senior advisor to the U.S.-based foundation of billionaire Carlos Slim focused on broadband connectivity for all and free online education.

== Early life and education ==
Born in Nogales, Sonora, Mexico, and raised in Nogales, Arizona, United States, Lopez became a United States citizen through naturalization. Lopez earned a bachelor's degree in liberal studies and political science from the University of Arizona.

== Career ==
In 1994, Lopez began his career as a congressional page for Congressman Ed Pastor. Lopez joined the Al Gore 2000 presidential campaign in 1999.

=== Mayor of Nogales, Arizona ===
Lopez won his first election in 2001, becoming mayor of Nogales, Arizona, a border town with a population of approximately 21,000. He served as Mayor of Nogales until 2004, earning the distinction of "America's youngest mayor."

=== Napolitano administration ===
In December 2003, Lopez was appointed by Arizona Governor Janet Napolitano as the executive director of the Arizona-Mexico Commission. He was designated as state Policy Adviser for Latin America, which is a Cabinet-level division of the governor's office responsible for overseeing and coordinating all international Latin American affairs for the State of Arizona. In late-2006, Governor Napolitano promoted Lopez to be her senior adviser, where he advised her at the Arizona State Capitol on the state's political relationship with other countries and Arizona's trade relationship with Mexico, Canada, Europe, the Asia-Pacific, and Japan. In late-2008, Lopez was appointed by Napolitano to serve as Director of the Arizona Department of Commerce, overseeing the state's economic development efforts and managing Arizona's investment policies.

=== U.S. Customs and Border Protection (CBP) ===
A few months after Arizona Governor Janet Napolitano was announced by President Barack Obama as the third United States Secretary of Homeland Security, Lopez was appointed to serve as the chief of staff for United States Customs and Border Protection. He served in the position until 2011.

=== Business ===
==== Intermestic Partners ====
In 2011, Lopez founded Intermestic Partners, one of the top international business development and political advisory firms in North America. Through Intermestic Partners, Lopez represents numerous Fortune 100 companies doing business between the United States and Latin America. Aside from advising top businesses and executives, he has worked with numerous political leaders in the United States and Latin America.

==== International Business Solutions ====
Lopez is the president and CEO of International Business Solutions, Inc., a business advisory firm that provides consultancy services to domestic and international organizations.

==== Carlos Slim Foundation ====
According to multiple references in print and online media, since 2011, Marco Lopez has served as a senior advisor to the U.S. Foundation of Mexican billionaire Carlos Slim Helu, who was ranked from 2010 to 2013 by Forbes magazine as the richest person in the world. The foundation's work initiated with the launch of Connect2Compete a low-cost broadband adoption program to connect eligible working-class families to the internet. Lopez is a member of the Council on Foreign Relations.

=== 2022 Arizona gubernatorial campaign ===
On March 16, 2021, López became the first candidate to announce his campaign for the 2022 Arizona gubernatorial election. López lost the primary election to Katie Hobbs.

== Personal life ==
Lopez is a licensed private pilot.
