= Vreeland (disambiguation) =

Vreeland is a city in the Netherlands.

Vreeland may also refer to:

- Vreeland (surname)
- USS Vreeland (FF-1068)
- Vreeland House
- Vreeland Avenue (NYS&W station)
