= Tacko =

Tacko is a given name. Notable people with the name include:

- Tacko Diabira (born 1999), Mauritanian footballer
- Tacko Fall (born 1995), Senegalese basketball player
- Tacko Fatim Thiam, Miss Senegal in 2011

== See also ==
- Taco (disambiguation)
- Tako (disambiguation)
