= Dorothea Celesia =

Poet and playwright

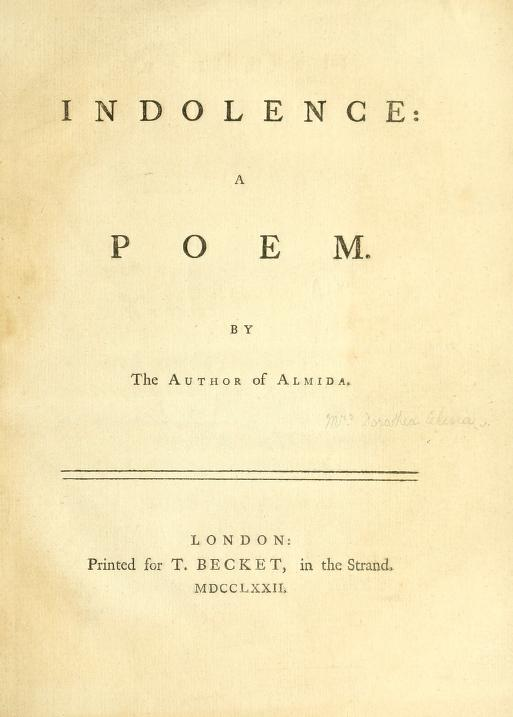
- Title page of Dorothea Celesia's Indolence; a poem (London: Becket, 1772; Internet Archive).
- Born: Dorothea Mallet baptised on 11 Oct. 1738 baptised at Chiswick, Middlesex
- Died: September 1790; Genoa
- Occupation: writer
- Spouse: Pietro Paolo Celesia
- Relatives: David Mallet (father); Susanna Mallet (mother)
- Writing career
- Pen name: "A lady"
- Language: English
- Notable works: Almida, a Tragedy (1771)

Dorothea Celesia (bap. 1738, died 1790) was a poet and playwright best known for Almida, her free translation of Voltaire's Tancrède (1760) notable for its emphasis on the heroine.

== Life and work ==
Dorothea Mallet was the youngest child of David Mallet (ca. 1701–1765), playwright and poet, and his first wife, Susanna (d. 1742). She was educated at home, and in 1758 she married Pietro Paolo Celesia (d. 1806), Ambassador to England (1755 to 1759). She moved with her husband to Genoa in 1759 and remained there for the rest of her life. David Garrick visited her when in Italy and produced her blank verse tragedy, Almida, at the Drury Lane Theatre. The play premiered on 1 January 1771 and had a successful run of ten nights, which afforded Celesia with some short-lived celebrity. Her version of the story is notable for its shift of focus from the warrior Tancred, as in Voltaire's original, to Almida, the heroine, and the latter's assertion of her right to choose her own spouse. Celesia's second major work was a long poem in heroic couplets, Indolence (1772). Her proposed translation of Voltaire's heroic tragedy Sémiramis (1746) never materialized.

Celesia was praised by Mary Scott in The Female Advocate (1775), her celebration of female writers and intellectuals.

== Selected works ==
- Almida, a Tragedy, as It is Performed at the Theatre Royal in Drury-Lane. By a Lady. (London: T. Becket and Co. in the Strand, 1771): free translation of Tancrède (1760) by Francois-Marie Arouet (Voltaire). The play sold successfully and went into several editions.
- Indolence: A Poem. By the author of Almida. (London: T. Becket and Co. in the Strand, 1771)

=== Etexts ===
- Almida, a Tragedy, as It is Performed at the Theatre Royal in Drury-Lane. By a Lady. Vol. I (London: T. Becket and Co. in the Strand, 1771) (Google Play)
- Indolence: A Poem. By the author of Almida. (London: T. Becket and Co. in the Strand, 1771) (Internet Archive)

== Sources ==
- Breen, Jennifer. "Celesia, Dorothea (bap. 1738, d. 1790)." Oxford Dictionary of National Biography. Ed. H. C. G. Matthew and Brian Harrison. Oxford: OUP, 2004. 22 Jan. 2007.
