= Taco (disambiguation) =

A taco is a traditional Mexican dish.

Taco or TACO may also refer to:

== People ==
- Taco (given name), a list of people with the given name or nickname
- Taco (musician) (born 1955), Indonesian-born Dutch singer Taco Ockerse
- Taco Hemingway (born 1990), stage name of Polish rapper, songwriter, and musician Filip Tadeusz Szcześniak
- Travis "Taco" Bennett (born 1994), American actor, DJ, and member of the music collective Odd Future
- Harry Bowman (1949–2019, alias "Taco"), American criminal

== Arts and entertainment ==
- "Tacos", a song by The Balham Alligators

== Science and technology ==
- Transfusion-associated circulatory overload (TACO), a transfusion medicine complication
- 14917 Taco, an asteroid

== Other uses ==
- Bete-ombro, also known as taco, a Brazilian game related to cricket
- Trump Always Chickens Out (TACO), a pejorative for Donald Trump's behavior

== See also ==
- Taco rice, an Okinawan food
- French tacos, a French food
- Tako (disambiguation)
- Tacko Fall (born 1995), Senegalese basketball player
