= Vreeland (surname) =

Vreeland is a surname. Notable people with the surname include:

- Albert L. Vreeland (1901–1975), American politician from New Jersey
- Byron Vreeland (1844–1889), American architect
- Caroline Vreeland (born 1987), German-American singer, actress, and model
- Charles E. Vreeland (1852–1916), American admiral
- Delmart Vreeland (born 1966), American associated with the September 11 attacks
- Diana Vreeland (1903–1989), American magazine editor, Vogue
- Edward B. Vreeland (1856–1936), American politician from New York
- Francis Vreeland (1879–1954), American painter
- Frederick Vreeland (1927–2026), American diplomat
- Gerard Joan Vreeland (1711–1752), Dutch colonial administrator
- James Vreeland (born 1971), American political scientist
- James P. Vreeland (1910–2001, American politician from New Jersey
- John Beam Vreeland (1852–1923), American politician and attorney from New Jersey
- Lisa Immordino Vreeland (fl. 2010s–present), American author and film director
- Nicholas Vreeland, Tibetan Buddhist monk
- Richard Vreeland or Disasterpeace (born 1986), American composer and musician
- Susan Vreeland (1946–2017), American author
- Shannon Vreeland (born 1991), American swimmer
- Thad Vreeland Jr. (1924–2010), American materialist scientist

== See also ==
- David Vreeland Kenyon (1930–2015), American federal judge from California
