= Thady =

Thady is a male given name—either a diminutive of Thaddeus or derived from the Irish Tadhg—it may refer to:

- Thady Connellan (1780–1854), Irish school-teacher, poet and historian
- Thady Coughlan (born 1951), former Limerick City Councillor and former Mayor of Limerick
- Thady Gosden (born 1995), British racehorse trainer
- Thady Ryan (1923–2005), Olympic Equestrian chef d'équipe for Ireland during the Summer Olympics of the 1960s
- Thady Wyndham-Quin, 7th Earl of Dunraven and Mount-Earl (1939–2011), Irish peer

== See also ==
- Thady Quill, popular traditional Irish song
