= Taddei =

Taddei is an Italian surname. Notable people with the surname include:

- Alessandro De Taddei (born 1971), Italian speed skater
- Claudio Taddei (1966–2019), Uruguayan-Swiss singer-songwriter and painter
- Frédéric Taddeï (born 1961), French journalist and television and radio host
- Giuseppe Taddei (1916–2010), Italian baritone
- Guadalupe Taddei (born 1963), Mexican civil servant
- Marc Taddei, conductor based in New Zealand
- Marco Taddei Né (born 1983), Ivorian football midfielder
- Mario Taddei (born 1972), Italian historian of science
- Max Taddei (born 1991), Italian professional footballer
- Nazareno Taddei (1920–2006), Italian Jesuit priest, linguist, author and film critic, after whom the Nazareno Taddei Award of the Venice International Film Festival is named
- Paolino Taddei (1860–1925), Italian politician
- Patrizia Taddei (born 1948), Sammarinese artist
- Pier Paolo Taddei (born 1949), Sammarinese sports shooter
- Riccardo Taddei (born 1980), Italian association footballer
- Rodrigo Taddei (born 1980), Brazilian footballer
- Rosa Taddei (1799–1869), Italian actress and poet
- Samuele Taddei (born 2003). Italian rugby player
- Taddeo Taddei (1470–1528), Florentine humanist and patron, after whom the Taddei Tondo is named
- Valdir Antônio Taddei (died 2004), Brazilian zoologist and expert on Neotropical bats

== See also ==
- Taddei Tondo, a relief sculpture by Michelangelo
