= Addai (surname) =

Addai or Addae is a surname of Ashanti origin. Notable people with this surname include:

- Alex Addai (born 1993), English footballer
- Bright Addae (born 1992), Ghanaian footballer
- Catherine Addai, Ghanaian-Canadian fashion designer
- Cynthia Addai-Robinson (born 1985), American actress
- Jeff Addai (born 1993), Canadian soccer player
- Joseph Addai (born 1983), American football player
- Kwame Addae, Ghanaian diplomat
- Levi David Addai (born 1983), British playwright
- Richard Addai (born 1986), Ghanaian footballer
- Richard Addai (born 1991), Ghanaian footballer
