= Tad (given name) =

Tad is a male given name or shortened version of Tadhg, Thaddeus, Thomas or other names. It may refer to:

== People ==
- Tad Boyle (born 1963), University of Colorado men's basketball head coach and former player
- Tad Crawford (born 1984), Canadian Football League player
- Tad Devine (born 1955), American political consultant
- Tad Dorgan (1877–1929), American cartoonist
- Edward T. Foote II (1937–2016), fourth president of the University of Miami
- Tad Friend (born 1962), American journalist
- Tad Gormley (1884–1965), Louisiana State University men's basketball head coach and trainer
- Tad Hilgenbrink (born 1981), American actor
- Tad Jones (politician) (born 1972), American politician
- Tad Kornegay (born 1982), collegiate football and Canadian Football League player
- Tad Lincoln (1853–1871), youngest son of Abraham and Mary Lincoln
- Tad J. Oelstrom (born 1943), retired US Air Force lieutenant general
- Tad Mosel (1922–2008), American Pulitzer Prize-winning playwright and dramatist
- Tad Richards (born 1940), American writer and visual artist
- Tad Robinson, (born 1956), American soul blues singer
- Tad Schmaltz (born 1960), professor of philosophy at the University of Michigan
- Tad Stones (born c. 1952), American animator, screenwriter, producer and director best known for his work for The Walt Disney Company
- Tad Wieman (1896–1971), American collegiate football player, coach and athletic director

== Fictional characters ==
- Thaddeus "Tad" Martin, on the American soap opera All My Children
- Wayne Terrence "Tad" Reeves, on the Australian soap opera Neighbours
- General Thaddeus Ross, from Marvel Comics, enemy of the Hulk
- Tad Hamilton, in the movie Win a Date with Tad Hamilton!
- Tad Spencer, a wealthy resident of Bullworth and member of the Prep clique from Bully (video game)
- Tad, a longnose butterflyfish in the Finding Nemo franchise
- Tad Ghostal, the real name of Space Ghost in Space Ghost: Coast to Coast
- Dr. Thaddeus "Rusty" Venture from the American animated television series The Venture Bros.
- Tad Strange, most average citizen in the town of Gravity Falls, Oregon
- Tad Cooper, Dragon from the tv show Galavant

== See also ==
- Thad
