= Tako =

Tako may refer to:

- Tako, Chiba, a town in Japan
- Tako (band), a Yugoslav progressive rock band
- Ibrahim Tako, Nigerian frontier politician
- Ido Tako, Israeli actor

== See also ==
- Taco (disambiguation)
- Tacko, a given name
