= Thaddeus (bishop of Caffa) =

Thaddeus (or Tadeos) was an Armenian bishop and friar. He was consecrated as the Armenian Apostolic bishop of Caffa (Note: See Armenians in Crimea.) by the Caucasian Albanian catholicos Stepanos IV in or before 1321. The papal bull Doctor gentium egregius of Pope John XXII, dated 22 November 1321, refers to him as "the son of perdition ... who separated from unity with the church." He opposed the sitting Latin bishop, Jerome of Catalonia. In 1322, however, he converted to Roman Catholicism and joined the Dominican Order. He may have been promised in exchange the right to succeed Jerome when the latter died. The question of the chronology of the Catholic bishops of Caffa in this period is somewhat confused. (Note: According to Patrick Zutshi, documents of indulgence from 1322–1323 and 1327 show both Jerome and Thaddeus as bishop. Zutshi suggests that they were joint bishops until Thaddeus was appointed to Corycus in 1328. The indulgence Zutshi dated to 1327 is dated to July–September 1326 by Peter Linehan, who published an edition of the text. It lists a Thadeus Caphensis, but no Jerome. According to Linehan, Thaddeus had succeeded as bishop by April 1326. Sherman Roddy has Thaddeus succeeding Jerome in 1323.)

Later in 1322, Thaddeus travelled with Jerome to Avignon to see the pope. He was still there in 1323. In a letter to King Leo II of Armenia dated 1323, Marino Sanudo Torsello writes that "Brother Thaddeus and his associates, your envoys, who are now at the Roman curia, will be able to report to you orally when they return to you" about how Sanudo was pleading for assistance to the Armenian kingdom. In 1328, Thaddeus was appointed Latin bishop of Corycus. In 1334, he succeeded Jerome as bishop of Caffa. He served until his death in 1357.

Thaddeus translated part of the Dominican Breviary into Armenian. Paul Riant, in editing the Ystoria de desolatione et conculcatione civitatis Acconensis et tocius terre sancte, a Latin account of the fall of Acre in 1291, proposed that its author, Thaddeus of Naples, was identical to Thaddeus of Caffa. This hypothesis is considered very unlikely.
