= Reinhold Röhricht =

German historian (1842–1905)

Gustav Reinhold Röhricht
- Born: 18 November 1842; Bunzlau, Silesia (now Bolesławiec, Poland
- Died: 2 May 1905 (aged 62)
- Occupation: German art historian

Gustav Reinhold Röhricht (18 November 1842 – 2 May 1905) was a German historian of the Crusades.

== Biography ==
He was born in Bunzlau in Silesia (now Bolesławiec, Poland), the third son of a miller. He studied at the Gymnasium in Sagan (now Żagań) from 1852 to 1862, and then attended the Berlin Theological School, where he obtained his licentiate in 1866. He then taught at the Berlin School of Religion, teaching Hebrew and German to the upperclassmen and Latin and Greek to the younger students. From 1867 to 1868 he taught at the Dorotheenstädtische Realgymnasium, then at the Luisenstädtische Realschule until 1875. From then until 1904 he taught at the Humboldtgymnasium, first as Oberlehrer and after 1882 as Professor. In 1904, due to poor health, the Prussian Ministry of Education forced him to retire with a pension. The pension was the same as that given to any other Gymnasium professor, and although it was surprising to others who were aware of Röhricht's fame and importance, he himself "ne sollicita point les hommages et ne rechercha pas les profitables honneures". He died the next year.

== Crusade historian ==
As Hans E. Mayer says, Röhricht was "an antiquarian rather than a historian", but nevertheless laid the "foundation of all modern crusade research". According to his obituary in The American Historical Review, "his most important work was almost wholly on the crusades, the eight main works published since 1874 comprising probably the most important contribution by any one scholar in this field." "Nul aujourd'hui", wrote the Revue de l'Orient latin, "ne pourrait occuper avec les mêmes titres et la même autorité qui lui la grande place qu'il laissera vide dans le domaine spécial de nos études." His scholarly reputation was such that in 1940 American historian John L. La Monte described his Geschichte des Königreichs Jerusalem as "a masterful history which left little to be desired", although it was written in "ponderous German"; La Monte favoured it in comparison to the recently published French history by René Grousset. Although the Geschichte is now out of date, Röhricht's other magnum opus, the Regesta Regni Hierosolymitani, remains useful to modern crusade historians; it is a collection of over nine hundred charters and other documents issued from the royal chancery of the Kingdom of Jerusalem, which, until edited and published by Röhricht, had remained scattered throughout dozens of other medieval cartularies. He was also the first historian to collect all the medieval material pertaining to the Fifth Crusade.

== Bibliotheca Geographica Palaestinae ==
Among the books on Palestine, Bibliotheca Geographica Palaestinae: Chronologisches Verzeichniss der auf die Geographie des heiligen Landes bezüglichen Literatur von 333 bis 1878 und Versuch einer Cartographie (Berlin, 1890), enumerates 3515 books, issued between AD 333 and 1878. A contemporary notice in The Church Quarterly Review characterized the book thus:

The title indicates clearly enough the general character of this book. It professes to give a list of all the books relating to the geography of Palestine from the year A.D. 333 to A.D. 1878 and also a chronological list of maps relating to Palestine. But the title does not give any idea of the exhaustive method in which the subject has been treated; the completeness is such that the book, which has rightly been described as 'indispensable' to students of Palestinian geography, will be found of great service in many other fields.

== Works ==
=== Books ===
- Beiträge zur Geschichte der Kreuzzüge (2 vols., Berlin and Leipzig, 1874–1878) (online)
- Quinti Belli sacri scriptores minores (Geneva, 1879) (online)
- Arabische Quellenbeiträge zur Geschichte der Kreuzzüge (1879) (online)
- Études sur les derniers temps du royaume de Jérusalem (1881) (online)
- Testimonia minora de quinto bello sacro (1882) (online)
- An edition of the Annales de Terre Sainte, 1095–1291 (Paris, 1884), with Gaston Raynaud (online)
- Das Reisebuch der Familie Rieter (Stuttgart, 1884) (online)
- Bibliotheca geographica Palaestinae (Berlin, 1890) (online)
- Kleine Studien zur Geschichte der Kreuzzüge (Berlin, 1890)
- Studien zur Geschichte des fünften Kreuzzuges (Innsbruck, 1891) (online)
- Die Deutschen im Heiligen Lande (Innsbruck, 1894)
- Geschichte der Kreuzzüge im umriss (1898) (online)
- Geschichte des Königreichs Jerusalem (1100–1291) (Innsbruck, 1898) (online)
- Geschichte des ersten Kreuzzuges (Innsbruck, 1901) (online)
- Deutsche Pilgerreisen nach dem heiligen Lande (1900) (online)
- Regesta Regni Hierosolymitani, 1097–1291 (Innsbruck, 1893), with Additamentum (1904) (online)

=== Articles ===
- "Der Kreuzzug Königs Andreas II von Ungarn", Forschungen zur deutschen Geschichte 16 (1876)
- "Der Kinderkreuzzug von 1212", Historische Zeitschrift 36 (1876)
- "Acte de soumission des barons du royaume de Jérusalem à Frédéric II (7 mai 1241)", Archives de l'Orient latin 1 (1881), pp. 395–402 (online)
- "Burgundisches", Neues Archiv der Gesellschaft für ältere deutsche Geschichtskunde 8 (1883), pp. 194–6
- "Hans Hundts Rechnungsbuch (1493-1494)", Neues Archiv für sächsische Geschichte und Altertumskunde 4 (1883), pp. 37–100
- "Lettres de Ricoldo de Monte-Croce sur la prise d'Acre (1291)", Archives de l'Orient latin 2 (1884), pp. 258–296 (online: see pp. 765 ff. of Google PDF)
- "Die Pastorellen (1251)", Zeitschrift für Kirchengeschichte 6 (1884)
- "Zur Geschichte der Kreuzzüge", Neues Archiv der Gesellschaft für ältere deutsche Geschichtskunde 11 (1886) pp. 571–9
- "Aus den Regesten Honorius III.", Neues Archiv der Gesellschaft für ältere deutsche Geschichtskunde 12 (1887), pp. 415–8
- "Zur Geschichte der Kirche S. Maria Latina in Jerusalem", Neues Archiv der Gesellschaft für ältere deutsche Geschichtskunde 15 (1890) pp. 203–6
- "Die Jerusalemfahrten der Grafen Philipp, Ludwig (1484) und Reinhard von Hanau (1550)", Zeitschrift des Vereins für hessische Geschichte und Landeskunde 26 (1891)
- "Bemerkungen zu Schillerschen Balladen", Zeitschrift für deutsche Philologie 26 (1894)
- "Karten und Pläne zur Palästinakunde aus dem 7.-16. Jahrhunderts", Zeitschrift des deutschen Palästina-Vereins 18 (1895)
- "Marino Sanudo sen. als Kartograph Palästinas", Zeitschrift des deutschen Palästina-Vereins 21 (1898), pp. 84–126
