= Paul Riant =

French medievalist (1836–1888)

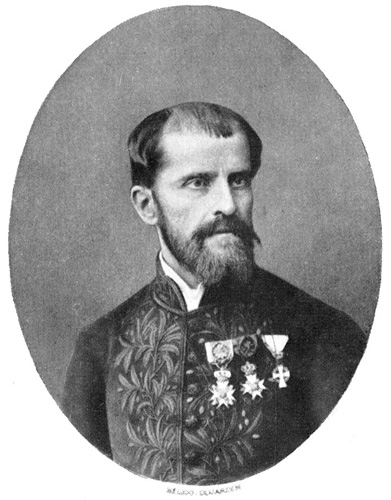
Paul Riant

Paul Edouard Didier Riant (7 August 1836, Paris – 17 December 1888, Château La Vorpillière in Massongex) was a French historian and scientific editor specializing in the Crusades.

He exercised a great activity of scientific editor of primary sources related to the Crusades and the Latin States of the East. He created and chaired the Société de l'Orient latin, as well as its official journal, the Revue de l'Orient latin, which continued to publish new issues until 1911. As a historian, he made a significant contribution to the study of the Northern Crusades, particularly those in the Scandinavian region.

== Biography ==
Paul Riant was the son of Didier-Nicolas Riant (1790–1864), municipal councillor of Paris and general councillor of the Seine, and Joséphine Anne Françoise Fayard de Bourdeille (1809–1881). Riant had two half-brothers, Charles and Théodore, born from his father's first marriage to Louise Mignon (1795–1833).

Riant studied at the Jesuit college of Vaugirard in the 15th Arrondissement of Paris. In 1859, he undertook a study trip to Denmark, Norway, Sweden and Finland, and a second trip in 1862. In 1865, he earned his doctorate in philosophy at La Sorbonne, presenting a thesis Expeditions and pilgrimages of the Scandinavians to the Holy Land during the Crusades.

On 8 March 1864, his well-regarded thesis led to Riant being conferred by pope Pius IX the title of Roman Count (comes Romanus). From that date, he referred himself Count Paul Riant. His heraldic arms are those of Jacques Riant, captain of a company of one hundred men of ordinances under Louis XII of France.

In 1875, Riant founded the Société de l'Orient latin devoted to the discovery and publication of documents relating to the Crusades. He served as secretary-treasurer and played a central role in the conduct of its work. Riant financed almost exclusively the publication of the Archives de l'Orient latin (1881 and 1884) and the Revue de l'Orient latin in twelve volumes (published from 1893 to 1911). He also supported the work of other researchers including the celebrated German historian Reinhold Röhricht. For Röhricht's work, Bibliotheca geographica Palaestinae, Riant provided numerous scarce documents and Röhricht dedicated this work to his memory when it was published in 1890, writing a commemorative article in the publication of the German Association for Palestine. Riant maintained relations with other authors of the school of German historians of the Crusade. For example, he was the author of a preface for the French translation of the 1883 edition of Heinrich Hagenmeyer's book on Pierre l'Ermite (Peter the Hermit).

In 1880, Riant was appointed member of the Académie des Inscriptions et Belles-Lettres. His role there dealt with issues of editing sources of the Crusades. On 8 September, 1868, he married Antoinette Cornuau d'Offémont (1845–1910), daughter of Baron d'Offémont. They had four children. For health reasons, he spent part of his time at his Château de Vorpillière in Massongex, Switzerland. In 1882, he made it his permanent residence and died there six years later. He is buried in the Basilica of Saint Maurice.

The day after his death, his half-brother Théodore announced his death in a letter to the Académie des Inscriptions et Belles-Lettres. Throughout his life, Riant accumulated books and documents, having a monumental research library of more than 40,000 volumes.

== Publications ==
His numerous publications include the following. A bibliography of his works was published as a part of Catalogue de la bibliothèque de feu M. le comte Riant, 2 volumes (1896).

- Expéditions et pèlerinages des Scandinaves en Terre Sainte au temps des croisades, 2 volumes (1865–1869). Scandinavian expeditions and pilgrimages to the Holy Land during the Crusades.
- Hystoria de desolacione et conculcacione civitatis Acconensis et tocius Terre Sancte, in A. D. 1291 (1874). By Italian magister Thaddeus of Naples. Edited by P. Riant.
- Notes sur les oeuvres de Gui de Bazaches (1877). Notes on the works of French cleric and Third Crusader Guy de Bazoches.
- "La charte du maïs" (1877) in Revue des questions historiques, Librairie de Victor Palmé, Volume XXI.
- Le changement de direction de la quatrième croisade: d'après quelques travaux récents. (1878). In Revue des questions historiques, Librairie de Victor Palmé, Volume XXIII.
- Inventaire critique des lettres historiques des croisades, 768-1100 (1880). A collections of letters relevant to the Crusades, 768–1110.
- "Un récit perdu de la première croisade" (1882). Extrait du Bulletin de la Société nationale des Antiquaires de France, Séance du 19 avril 1882, pp. 203–212.
- "Un dernier triomphe d'Urbain II" (1883), in Revue des questions historiques, juillet 1883, XXXIV, pp. 247–255.
- La Part de l'évêque de Bethléem dans le butin de Constantinople en 1204, (1886).
- Les Possessions de l'église de Bethléem en Gascogne (1887).
- Exuviae Sacrae Constantinoploitanae (1877–1888). A collection of documents edited by Riant relating to the status of relics at Constantinople before 1204 and their disposition after the Fourth Crusade. A further study, La croix des premiers croisés; la sainte lance; la sainte couronne, was published by French archaeologist and art historian Fernand de Mély in 1904.
- Études sur l'histoire de l'église de Bethléem, 3 volumes (1889, 1896).
