= Tadeusz =

Tadeusz is a Polish first name, derived from Thaddaeus.

Tadeusz may refer to:

- Tadeusz Bednarowicz (1906–1939), Polish footballer
- Tadeusz Bór-Komorowski (1895–1966), Polish military leader
- Tadeusz Borowski (1922–1951), Polish writer and The Holocaust survivor
- Tadeusz Boy-Żeleński (1874–1941), Polish gynaecologist, writer, poet, art critic, translator of French literary classics and journalist
- Tadeusz Brzeziński (1896–1991), Polish consular official and the father of President Jimmy Carter's national security adviser, Zbigniew Brzezinski
- Tadeusz Czeżowski (1889–1981), Polish philosopher and logician
- Tadeusz Dąbal, Polish-American US Army non-commissioned officer
- Tadeusz Dołęga-Mostowicz (1898–1939), Polish journalist and author of over a dozen popular novels
- Tadeusz Drzazga (born 1975), Polish weightlifter
- Tadeusz Figiel (1948–2025), Polish mathematician
- Tadeusz Fijas (born 1960), Polish ski jumper
- Tadeusz Hollender (1910–1943), Polish poet, translator and humorist
- Tadeusz Rozwadowski (1866–1928), Polish military commander, diplomat, and politician, a founder of the modern Polish Republic
- Tadeusz Kantor (1915–1990), Polish artist and theatre-maker
- Tadeusz Kassern (1904–1957), Polish composer
- Tadeusz Wladyslaw Konopka, birth name of Ted Knight (1923–1986), American actor
- Tadeusz Konwicki (1926–2015), Polish writer
- Tadeusz Kościuszko (1746–1817), Polish–Lithuanian military leader and national hero, and American Revolutionary War general
- Tadeusz Kotarbiński (1886–1981), pupil of Kazimierz Twardowski
- Tadeusz Krwawicz (1910–1988), Polish pioneer in medicine
- Tadeusz Kurcyusz (1881–1944), commandant of Narodowe Sily Zbrojne
- Tadeusz Łomnicki (1927–1992), Polish actor
- Tadeusz Michalik (born 1991), Polish Olympic bronze medalist in Greco-Roman wrestling at the 2020 Olympics
- Tadeusz Miciński (1873–1918), Polish poet and playwright
- Tadeusz Pietrzykowski (1917–1991), Polish boxer and Polish Armed Forces soldier, known as the "boxing champion of Auschwitz"
- Tadeusz Piotrowski (mountaineer) (1940–1986), mountaineer and writer
- Tadeusz Piotrowski (sociologist) (born 1940), sociologist and author of books about Holocaust and the history of Poland
- Tadeusz Rejtan (1742–1780), Polish nobleman
- Tadeusz Romer (1894–1978), Polish diplomat and politician
- Tadeusz Różewicz (1921–2014), Polish poet and writer
- Tadeusz Rut (1931–2002), Polish hammer thrower
- Tadeusz Sapierzyński (born 1958), Polish army officer
- Tadeusz Sendzimir (1894–1989), Polish engineer and inventor
- Tadeusz Swietochowski (1934–2017), American historian and Caucasologist
- Tadeusz Ślusarski (1950–1998), Polish Olympic gold medalist in pole vault at the 1976 Olympics
- Tadeusz Tański (1892–1941), Polish automobile engineer and the designer of, among others, the first Polish serially-built automobile
- Tadeusz Tomaszewski (born 1959), Polish politician, Member of the Parliament
- Tadeusz Ważewski (1896–1972), Polish mathematician
- Tadeusz Wojciechowski (1838–1919), Polish historian, professor
- Tadeusz Wojciechowski (1925–2026), Polish economist, professor, and Warsaw Uprising participant
- Tadeusz Zawadzki (1921–1943), Polish anti-Nazi resistance fighter
- Tadeusz Żychiewicz (1922–1994), Polish journalist, art historian and publicist

== Fictional characters ==
- Tadeusz Soplica, the titular character of Pan Tadeusz, an 1834 epic poem by Adam Mickiewicz
