= Marie-Anne Rousselet =

French artist (1732–1826)

- Born: 6 December 1732; Paris, France
- Died: 1826; Paris, France
- Other names: Marie-Anne Tardieu, Widow Tardieu, Veuve Tardieu, MRV Tardieu
- Known for: Engraving
- Spouse: Pierre François Tardieu

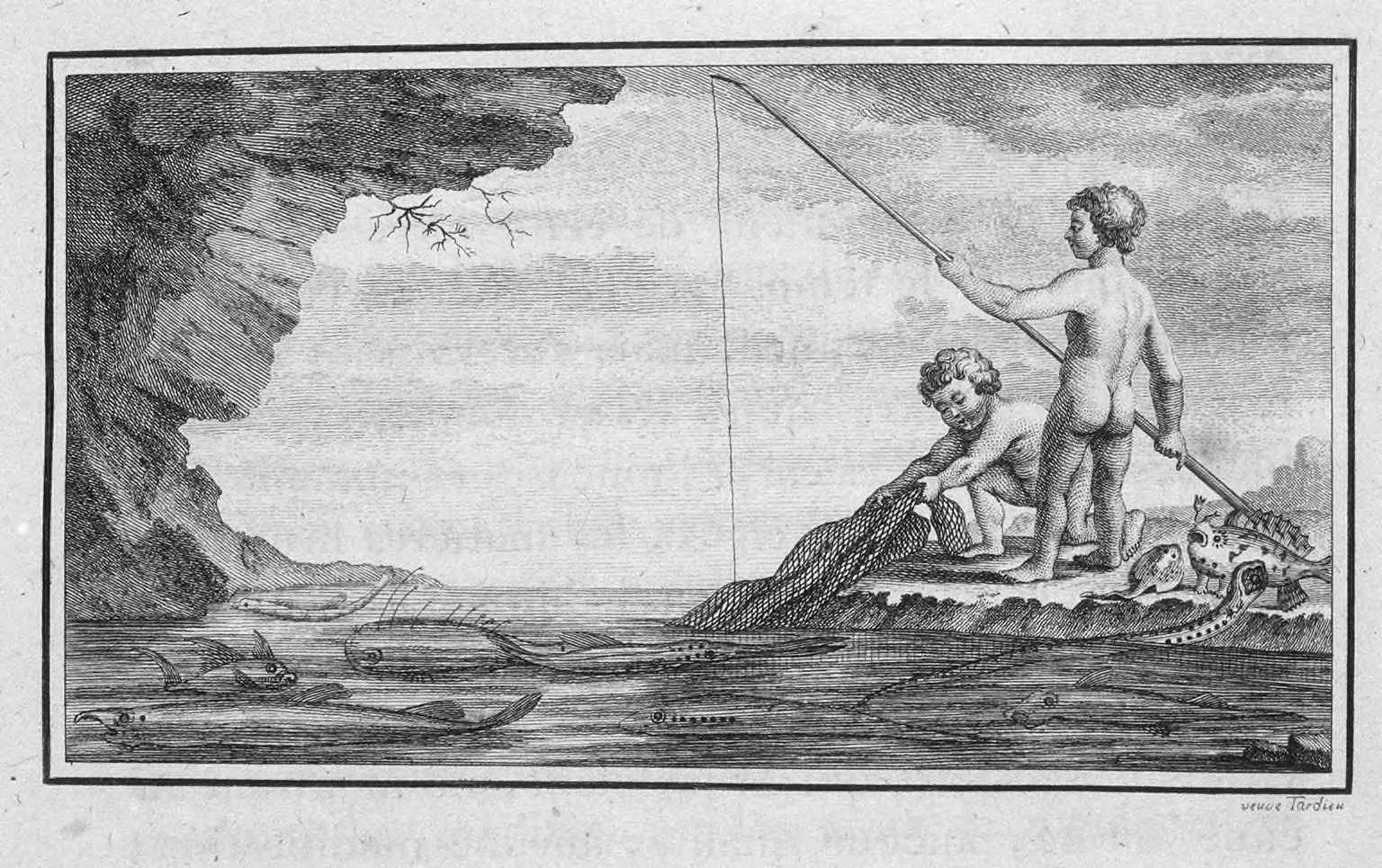
Image by Rousselet, from the Bernard Germain de Lacépède book, Illustrations de Histoire naturelle des poissons (1798–1803).

Marie-Anne Rousselet, also known as Marie-Anne Tardieu, Veuve Tardieu (Widow Tardieu), (1732–1826) was a French engraver and illustrator.

== About ==
Marie-Anne Rousselet was born in Paris, France on 6 December 1732 to medal engraver Alexis Étienne Rousselet. All four of her siblings were also engravers. She was related to engraver, Gilles Rousselet (1614–1686), and the sculptor, Jean Rousselet (1656–1693), both of whom were members of the Académie royale de peinture et de sculpture.

In 1757, she married engraver and cartographer, Pierre François Tardieu, as his second wife. The couple worked together at times. After her husband's death in 1771, she achieved recognition for her work and contributions. Marie-Anne made several engravings of historical and genre subjects, including Saint John the Baptist (1756) after Jean-Baptiste van Loo.

She died in Paris on 1826.

Her work is in public collections including the Nationalmuseum of Stockholm, Rijksmuseum, among others.

== Publications ==
These are known publications that featured engraving work by Rousselet.

- Lacépède, Bernard Germain (1798–1803). Illustrations de Histoire naturelle des poissons. Paris, France: Chez Passan.
- Leclerc de Buffon, Georges-Louis (1781). Illustrations de Histoire naturelle des oiseaux. Paris, France: Imprimerie royale.
- Leclerc de Buffon, Georges-Louis (1788). Illustrations de Histoire naturelle des quadrupèdes ovipares et des serpents. Paris, France: Hotel de Thou.
- de Lamarck, Jean-Baptiste (1803). Histoire naturelle des végétaux classés par familles, Avec la citation de la classe et de l'ordre de Linné etc. Paris, France: chez Deterville. doi:10.5962/bhl.title.58719. ISBN 0665500815.
- Latreille, Pierre André (1805). Histoire naturelle, générale et particulière des crustacés et des insectes. Paris, France. doi:10.5962/bhl.title.15764.
