= Tadeusz Bednarowicz =

Polish footballer (1906–1939)

Personal information
- Date of birth: 28 August 1906
- Place of birth: Sułkowice, Poland
- Date of death: 20 February 1944 (aged 37)
- Place of death: Gross-Rosen concentration camp
- Height: 1.75 m (5 ft 9 in)
- Position: Goalkeeper

Senior career*
Years	Team	Apps	(Gls)
–1924	Cracovia		
1924–1927	Legia Warsaw	1	(0)
1928–1929	Polonia Warsaw		
- * Club domestic league appearances and goals

Tadeusz Bednarowicz (28 August 1906 – 20 February 1944), also known as Marian Bednarowicz, was a Polish footballer who played as a goalkeeper. In 1943, he was imprisoned in the Fort VII in Poznań, before being transferred to the Gross-Rosen concentration camp on 19 February 1944, where he is believed to have died the following day.
