= Thad Bingel =

American government official

Chief of Staff for U.S. Customs and Border Protection
- In office 2007–2008
- Succeeded by: Marco A. López Jr.

Personal details
- Born: Thaddeus Bingel; 1960 (age 65–66) Plattsburgh, New York, U.S.
- Party: Republican
- Education: College of the Holy Cross (BA); Georgetown University (JD)

Thaddeus M. Bingel (born 1960) is an American lawyer working as a principal at Command Consulting Group. From 2007 to 2008, Bingel served as chief of staff for U.S. Customs and Border Protection.

== Early life and education ==
A native of Plattsburgh, New York, Bingel received his bachelor's degree from College of the Holy Cross. He went on to graduate from Georgetown University Law School.

== Career ==
As chief of staff at U.S. Customs and Border Protection, Bingel worked closely with Commissioner W. Ralph Basham. In this capacity, Bingel was in charge of keeping the Commissioner informed of any intelligence and making sure news was disseminated appropriately.

Bingel was also majority counsel to the House Judiciary Committee in the 108th and 109th Congresses. Bingel served as a consultant and policy analyst under Dick Armey, the former Majority Leader in the 107th Congress.
