= Revue de l'Orient Latin =

The Revue de l'Orient Latin is a 12-volume set of medieval documents which was published from 1893 to 1911. It was a continuation of the Archives de l'Orient Latin, two earlier volumes, which were published from 1881 to 1884. Various medieval documents and letters from the sets are often cited in scholarly works about the Crusades. While the Revue is often abbreviated ROL and the "Archives" are abbreviated AOL, the two sets of medieval documents are usually referred to together, as a set.

The Archives were published in Paris. The Revue was the official journal of the archaeological foundation "Société de l'Orient latin" founded in 1875 by Count Paul Riant (1836–1888), and was published at the society's headquarters in Geneva. Initial publications were divided into geographical and historical series. The geographical portions contained the itineraries of pilgrims. The historical series included chronicles, letters, and charters.

== See also ==
- Text publication society
