= Pierre François Tardieu =

French engraver and cartographer (1711–1771)

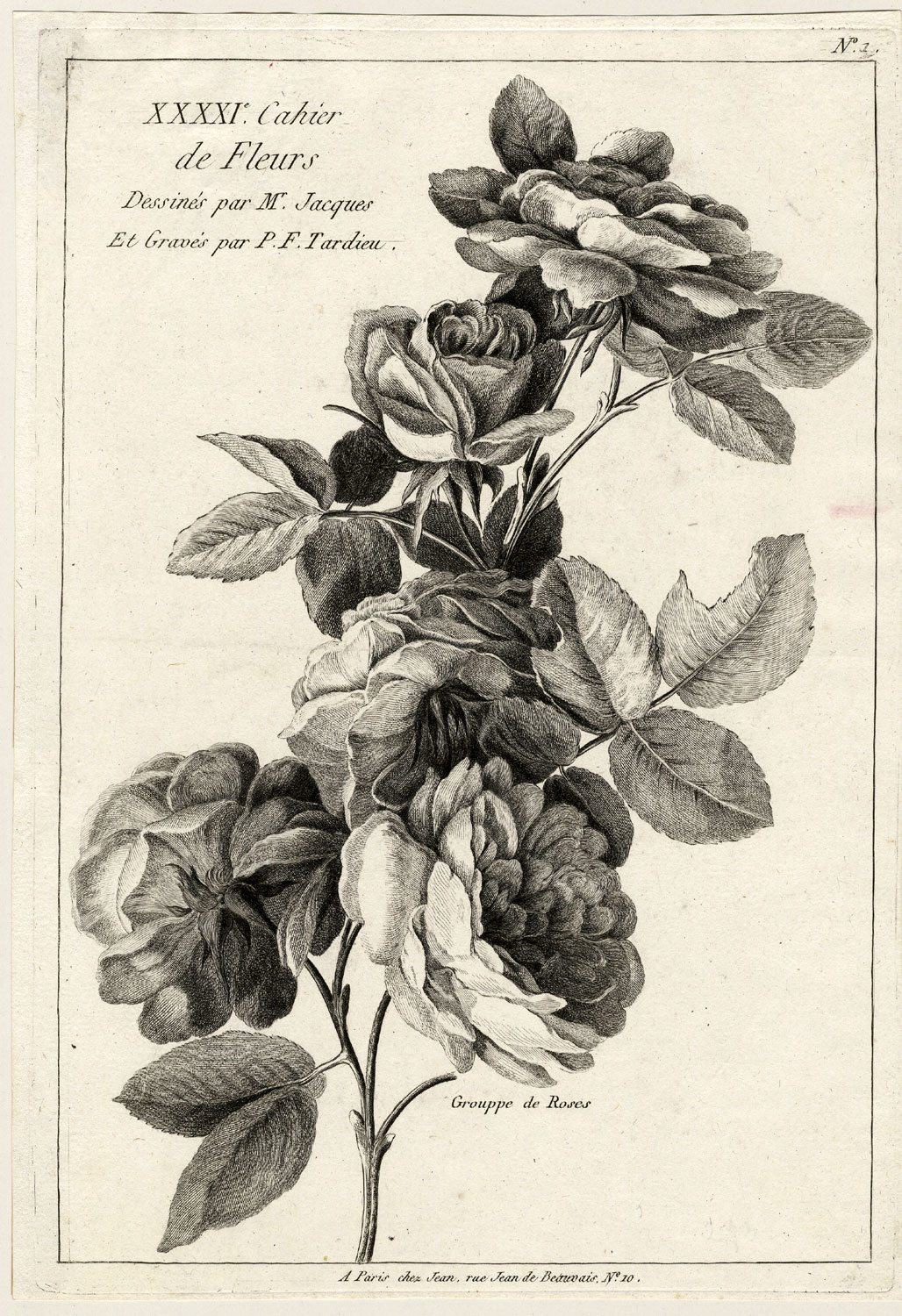
- Engraving by Pierre François Tardieu, 1749.
- Born: 1711; Paris, France
- Died: 1771 (aged 59–60); Paris, France
- Education: Nicolas Henri Tardieu
- Known for: Engraving, Cartography
- Spouse: Marie-Anne Rousselet

Pierre François Tardieu (1711–1771) was a French engraver and cartographer, nephew of Nicolas-Henri Tardieu.

Pierre Francois Tardieu was born around 1711 in Paris, son of Jean Tardieu. His uncle, Nicolas Henri Tardieu, taught him the art of engraving. He produced historical and genre works. He is noted for two excellent engravings after Peter Paul Rubens, the Judgement of Paris and Persée et Andromache. He did much work on the engravings for the Fables de la Fontaine after drawings by Oudry.

Tardieu's second wife, Marie-Anne Rousselet (1733-1826), was from the family of the engraver Gilles Rousselet and the sculptor Jean Rousselet, both of whom were members of the Academy.
