= Taco (given name) =

Taco is a given name and a nickname. Notable people with the name include:

== Given name ==
- Taco Dibbits (born 1968), Dutch art historian
- Taco Kuiper (1941–2004), South African investigative journalist
- Taco Ludigman, legendary, possibly fictitious, second potestaat (magistrate governor) of Friesland, elected about 819
- Taco Mesdag (1829–1902), Dutch painter
- Taco Ockerse (born 1955), Indonesian-born Dutch singer
- Taco Remkes (born 1984), Dutch golfer
- Taco Scheltema (1766–1837), Dutch portrait painter
- Taco van den Honert (born 1966), Dutch former field hockey player
- Taco van der Hoorn (born 1993), Dutch cyclist

== Nickname ==
- Taco Charlton (born 1994), American National Football League player
- Kenneth Cockrell (born 1950), American retired astronaut and engineer
- Taco Dowler (born 2003), American football player
- Antonio Larreta (1922–2015), Uruguayan writer, critic and actor
- Taco Wallace (born 1981), American former National Football League player
- Taco Hemingway (born 1990), Polish rapper

== See also ==
- Tacko, given name
