= Tadateru =

- Gender: Male

Origin
- Origin: Japanese
- Meaning: Different meanings depending on the kanji used

Tadateru (written: 忠輝, 忠英 or 忠照) is a masculine Japanese given name. Notable people with the name include:

- Hachisuka Tadateru (蜂須賀 忠英) (1611–1652), Japanese daimyō
- Tadateru Konoe (近衛 忠煇; 1939–2026), Japanese humanitarian, president of the International Federation of Red Cross and Red Crescent Societies
- Matsudaira Tadateru (松平 忠輝) (1592–1683), Japanese daimyō
- Nishio Tadateru (西尾 忠照) (1613–1654), Japanese daimyō
- Torii Tadateru (鳥居 忠英) (1665–1716), Japanese daimyō
