= Tadeo Gomez =

Guitar builder

Tadeo Gomez (1902–1986) was a worker at Fender Musical Instrument Manufacturing Company in Fullerton, California in the 1950s. He has become famous amongst players and collectors of electric guitars for the high quality of his work and his habit of signing his name or initials on the guitars he helped to craft.

His initials appear on famous guitars such as Eric Clapton's Brownie.
