= Arizona-Mexico Commission =

Bilateral non-profit organization

- Abbreviation: AMC
- Founded: June 15, 1972; 54 years ago
- Tax ID no.: 23-7290803
- Legal status: 501(c)(4) nonprofit organization
- Headquarters: Phoenix, Arizona, United States
- Coordinates: 33.448116°N 112.09703°W
- President: Jessica Pacheco
- Chair: Katie Hobbs
- President: Todd Sanders
- Revenue: $303,943 (2013)
- Expenses: $333,884 (2013)
- Employees: 0 (2013)
- Volunteers: 46 (2013)
- Website: www.azmc.org
- Formerly called: Arizona-Mexico West Trade Commission

The Arizona-Mexico Commission (AMC), is a public/private, 501(c)(4) non-profit organization that works to improve the economic prosperity and quality of life in Arizona through binational collaborations with Mexico. Chaired by the Governor of Arizona, the Arizona-Mexico Commission works to strengthen Arizona's ties to Mexico through strong, public/private collaborations in advocacy, trade, networking and information.

Former Arizona Governor Doug Ducey is the current chair of the Arizona-Mexico Commission. Jessica Pacheco was appointed by Arizona Governor Doug Ducey to serve as the President of the Arizona-Mexico Commission Board of Directors in February 2017 and Juan Ciscomani, Senior Advisor for Regional and International Affairs to Governor Ducey serves as the organization's Vice Chair.

== History ==
The Arizona-Mexico Commission was founded in March 1959 as the Arizona-Mexico West Trade Commission by Governor Paul J. Fannin and his Sonoran counterpart, Álvaro Obregón Tapia, at the University of Arizona's first Arizona-Sonora International Conference on Regional Development.

In 1972, Arizona Governor Jack Williams, announced the restructuring of the Arizona-Mexico West Coast Commission into the present-day AMC, establishing a formal mechanism under the Office of the Governor that promotes greater private sector involvement in the Arizona-Mexico relationship. With this transformation came the creation of six bilateral committees: Trade, Tourism, Banking and Finances, Health, Agriculture, and Livestock.

Two years later, in July 1974, in Guaymas, Sonora, these committees met formally at the first Plenary Session between the AMC and its sister organization, the Comisión Sonora-Arizona. (CSA). Since then, the AMC and the CSA have held bi-annual plenary sessions, alternating in location between Sonora and Arizona, to discuss and collaborate on programs targeting the vital relationships shared between the two states.

== Structure ==
The Arizona-Mexico Commission is governed by a gubernatorial Board of Directors and chairs by the Governor of Arizona. The organization also has a membership base of approximately 400 members from the public and private sectors.

The work of the Arizona-Mexico Commission is driven by 16 binational working committees including: Agribusiness & Wildlife, Art and Culture, Community and Social Organizations, Economic Development; Education, Emergency Management, Energy, Environment & Water, Financial, and Legal Services, Health Services, Mining, Real Estate, Security, Tourism, Transportation, Infrastructure, and Ports, and Sports (Ad-Hoc). Each committee is led by both a private and a public co-chair.

== Past accomplishments ==
- 2011: The AMC signs “A Shared Vision for Arizona and Sonora.”
- 2007: Supported by the work of the AMC Emergency Management Committee, Arizona acquires a web-based alert and notification system now available to the State of Sonora and its communities.
- 2004: AMC Transportation Committee investigates and assesses the viability of the Port of Guaymas as a maritime addition to the CANAMEX Trade Corridor.
- 1996: The AMC puts forth recommendation and advocates for the creation of the CANAMEX Trade Corridor.
- 1994: Support by petitions from the AMC, the President of the U.S. and Department of the Interior resume and complete the Central Arizona Project.
- 1993: In collaboration with the University of Arizona, the AMC creates the Arizona Economic Indicators Report.
