= Gilles Rousselet =

French burin engraver, print dealer and draftsman

- Born: 1610; Paris, France
- Died: 15 July 1686 (aged 75–76); Paris, France
- Other names: Aegidius Rousselet, Ægidius Rousselet, Edigious Rousselet
- Years active: 1634–1678
- Era: Baroque
- Spouse: Judith Le Goux

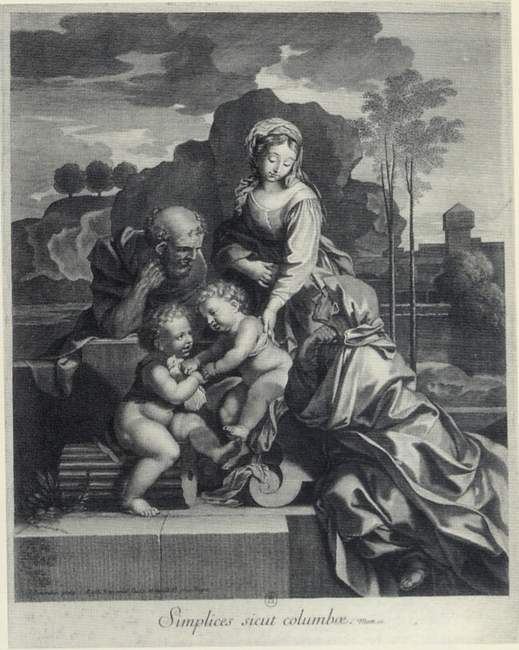
Simplice Sicut Columbae, engraved by Gilles Rousselet, after Sébastien Bourdon's "Sainte Famille, sainte Elisabeth et saint Jean-Baptiste dans un paysage"

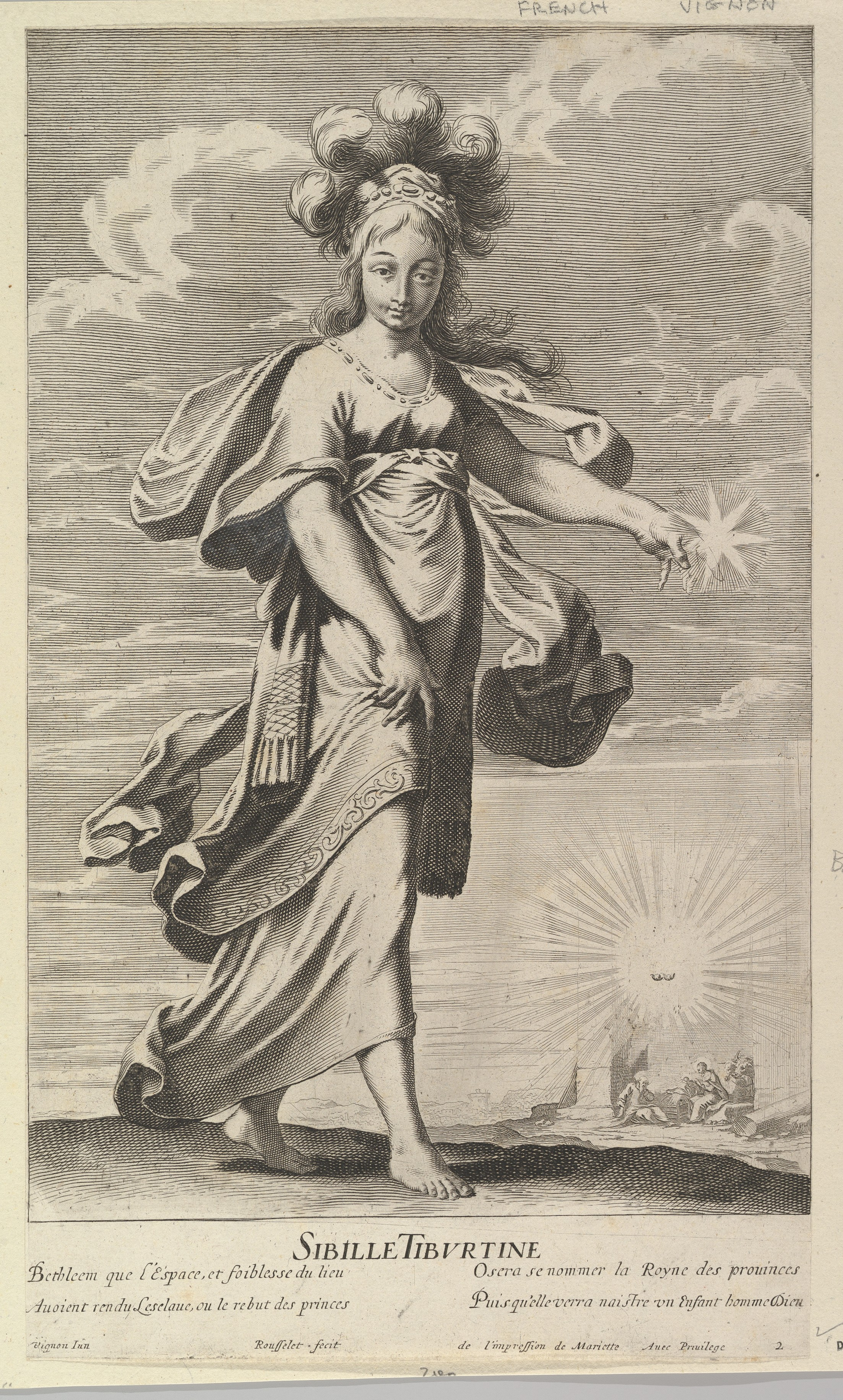
Sibille Tiburtine or Sibylle Tiburtine, from the series Douze Sybilles, engraved by Gilles Rousselet after Abraham Bosse

Gilles Rousselet, also known as Aegidius Rousselet (1610–1686) was a French burin engraver, print dealer, and draftsman, active during the Baroque-era. He was one of the most skilled engravers of the seventeenth century and a member of the Académie.

== About ==
Gilles Rousselet, born in 1610 in Paris, France. His father was a bookseller and possibly a printmaker. It is unknown with whom he studied engraving under, but his work was inspired by Abraham Bloemaert.

Gilles Rousselet married in 1645 to Judith Le Goux in the Saint-Nicolas-des-Champs church, and together they had fourteen children. He was the father of sculptor, Jean Rousselet (1656–1693).

A lot of Rousselet's engraving work was a reproduction of works by other artists. During his career he reproduced work by artists, including Grégoire Huret, Claude Vignon, Jacques Stella, Laurent de La Hyre, Raphael, Pietro da Cortona, Guido Reni, Valentin de Boulogne, Nicolas Poussin, and his friend Charles Le Brun. Unlike Rousselet, many of the known engravers of the 17th century created their own original artworks and were held at higher esteem, such as Jacques Callot, Claude Mellan, Robert Nanteuil, and Israel Silvestre.

The Académie royale de peinture et de sculpture had always considered printmakers and engravers inferior to painters, and starting in 1663, the first engravers were admitted, starting in April with François Chauveau. On 7 August 1663 Rousselet was the second engraver to enter the Académie royale de peinture et de sculpture. Charles LeBrun had supported Rousselet's entrance to the Académie. He exhibited his works at the Salons exhibition of 1664 and of 1673.

== Death and legacy ==
In 1678, Rousselet went blind and was no longer able to work.

He died on 15 July 1686 in Paris, France, and was buried eleven days later. On July 22, 1686, an inventory was made of his belongings, which included all of his prints and engraving plates.

He was related to engraver Marie-Anne Rousselet.

== Collections ==
His work is included in the public museum collections at Harvard Art Museums, the Metropolitan Museum of Art, Fine Arts Museums of San Francisco, the National Portrait Gallery, London, Rijksmuseum, National Gallery of Art, the National Gallery of Victoria, Minneapolis Institute of Art, Art Gallery of New South Wales, Victoria and Albert Museum, Philadelphia Museum of Art, National Gallery of Ireland, among others.
