= Catherine Addai =

Ghanaian-Canadian fashion designer

Catherine Addai is a Ghanaian-Canadian fashion designer and founder of the women's clothing brand Kaela Kay.

== Career ==
Addai has a degree in health informatics. She worked as a decision support consultant while working on her fashion line. She launched the label in 2013 while on maternity leave with her daughter Makaela.

Early in her journey, clothing alterations and fittings were completed in Addai's basement in Mississauga. With no formal training in design, fashion, she hired seamstresses from Toronto to help her learn the trade. She quit her consulting job in 2017 to work on her brand full-time. In 2019, Addai opened up her first brick-and-mortar boutique in North York. The brand is named after one of her daughters.

She works primarily with Ankara fabric, a West African fabric method of dying cotton material, and experienced some "cultural resistance" to her designs initially. Celebrities including Busy Philipps and Tracy Moore have worn her designs, exposing them to a wider audience.

In 2019, Addai was one of six female Canadian entrepreneurs highlighted in a digital video series Startup and Slay.

== Awards ==
In 2018, Addai was given the People's Choice Award for Fashion Designer of the Year from ByBlacks.com. Addai was also named African Fashion Industry Awards Ladies Wear Designer of the Year three separate times.

== Personal life ==
Addai was born in Ghana, lived in Amsterdam until she was three and moved to Canada when she was seven. Now based in Toronto, she is a wife and mother to three young children.
