= Thaddeus of Naples =

Italian author (fl. 1291)

Start of Thaddeus' History in the manuscript Madrid 9201. The red text (rubric) names the author and the work. The decorative initial U begins the address Universis Christi fidelibus, "to all Christ's faithful".

Thaddeus of Naples (fl. 1291) was an Italian author who wrote the History of the Desolation and Treading Down of the City of Acre and of the Whole Holy Land, an account of the fall of Acre in May 1291.

Thaddeus was probably born around the middle of the 13th century. He was a citizen of Naples and a magister (teacher). He was highly educated and wrote in a rhetorical style in eloquent but difficult Latin. He displays his wide reading by quoting from Augustine, Boethius, Horace, Jerome, Orosius and Statius. He wrote his History in Messina in December 1291. He claimed to have lived in Outremer for several years, although he was not present at the siege of Acre. His date of death is unknown. Paul Riant suggested that Thaddeus was the same person as the Thaddeus who was the bishop of Caffa from 1324, but this hypothesis is extremely unlikely.

The History is written in the form of a letter addressed to all of Christendom. It is based on eyewitness accounts. Thaddeus expresses admiration for the Templars, Hospitallers and Teutonic Knights. He is critical of the city's inhabitants, accusing them of disunity. He is especially critical of the merchant class, singling out the Pisans and Venetians for special opprobrium and accusing them of collaboration with the enemy. Ultimately, he blames the fall of Acre on the sins of Christendom. His favoured passages from the Bible are in Jeremiah and Isaiah. His favourite medieval author was Joachim of Fiore, whose prophetic ideas were influential in the Kingdom of Naples.

Structurally, the History is divided into four parts. The first is a prologue (lines 1–46). The second is a description of the siege (47–772). It is followed by a prophetic interpretation of events, including a planctus and prayers for the fallen city (773–1527). The final section is an exhortation to conquer Jerusalem addressed to the pope and all Christian sovereigns (1528–1610).

The History is preserved complete in five manuscripts and partially in a sixth. All date to the 14th and 15th centuries and all were copied in France or Spain. The best copy, which served as the base text for the most recent critical edition, is London, British Library, Add. MS 22800, copied in northern France.

== Editions ==
- Magister Thadeus Neapolitanus (2004). "Ystoria de desolatione et conculcatione civitatis Acconensis et tocius terre sancte". In Robert B. C. Huygens (ed.). Excidium Acconis gestorum collectio. Brepols.
- Magister Thadeus Neapolitanus (1873). Paul Riant (ed.). Hystoria de desolacione et conculcacione civitatis acconensis et tocius terre sancte. J. G. Fick.

== Bibliography ==
- Atiya, Aziz Suryal (1938). The Crusade in the Later Middle Ages. Methuen.
- Atiya, Aziz Suryal (1975). "The Crusade in the Fourteenth Century". In Harry W. Hazard (ed.). A History of the Crusades, Volume III: The Fourteenth and Fifteenth Centuries. University of Wisconsin Press. pp. 3–26.
- Damian-Grint, Peter (2010). "Thadeus Neapolitanus". In Graeme Dunphy (ed.). Encyclopedia of the Medieval Chronicle. Vol. 2. Brill. pp. 1417–1418.
- Edgington, Susan B. (2006). "Thaddeus of Naples". In Alan V. Murray (ed.). The Crusades: An Encyclopedia. Vol. 4. ABC-CLIO. p. 1169.
- Runciman, Steven (1954). A History of the Crusades. Vol. 3: The Kingdom of Acre and the Later Crusades. Cambridge University Press.
- Russo, Luigi (2019). "Taddeo di Napoli". Dizionario Biografico degli Italiani, Volume 94: Stampa–Tarantelli (in Italian). Rome: Istituto dell'Enciclopedia Italiana. ISBN 978-8-81200032-6.
- Shagrir, Iris (2019). "Thadeus of Naples on the Fall of Acre". In John France (ed.). Acre and Its Falls: Studies in the History of a Crusader City. Brill. pp. 148–165.
