= Thad Vreeland Jr. =

- Born: October 20, 1924; San Marino, California, U.S.
- Died: August 9, 2010 (aged 85); Arcadia, California, U.S.
- Education: California Institute of Technology
- Known for: Research in Dislocation Mechanics in metals
- Scientific career
- Fields: Materials Science
- Workplaces: California Institute of Technology
- Doctoral advisor: David S. Wood

Thad Vreeland Jr. (October 20, 1924 – August 9, 2010) was an American materials scientist. He was Professor of Materials Science at the California Institute of Technology.

== Career ==
Vreeland's career at Caltech began with his B.S., earned in 1949 and his Ph.D. in 1952. He served as Professor of Mechanical Engineering and then Professor of Materials Science from 1954 to 1991, and afterward Professor Emeritus.

Vreeland's work on the mechanics of plastic deformation in solids and especially on dislocation behavior during the 1950s and through 1960s and 1970s was widely cited. He collaborated with his colleagues at Caltech, including David Wood. He was active in the study of shock wave consolidation in powdered metals and developing methods for the measurement of strain in multilayer semiconductors using x-rays in the 1980s.

== Partial list of accomplishments ==
- Served as Corporal in the 89th Chemical Mortar Battalion in World War II
- Bachelors, Masters, and Doctoral degrees from Caltech, 1946-1952
- Wrote numerous journal articles in materials science
- Co-authored "The Analysis of Stress and Deformation" with George W. Housner.
