= Mario Taddei =

Italian academic (born 1972)

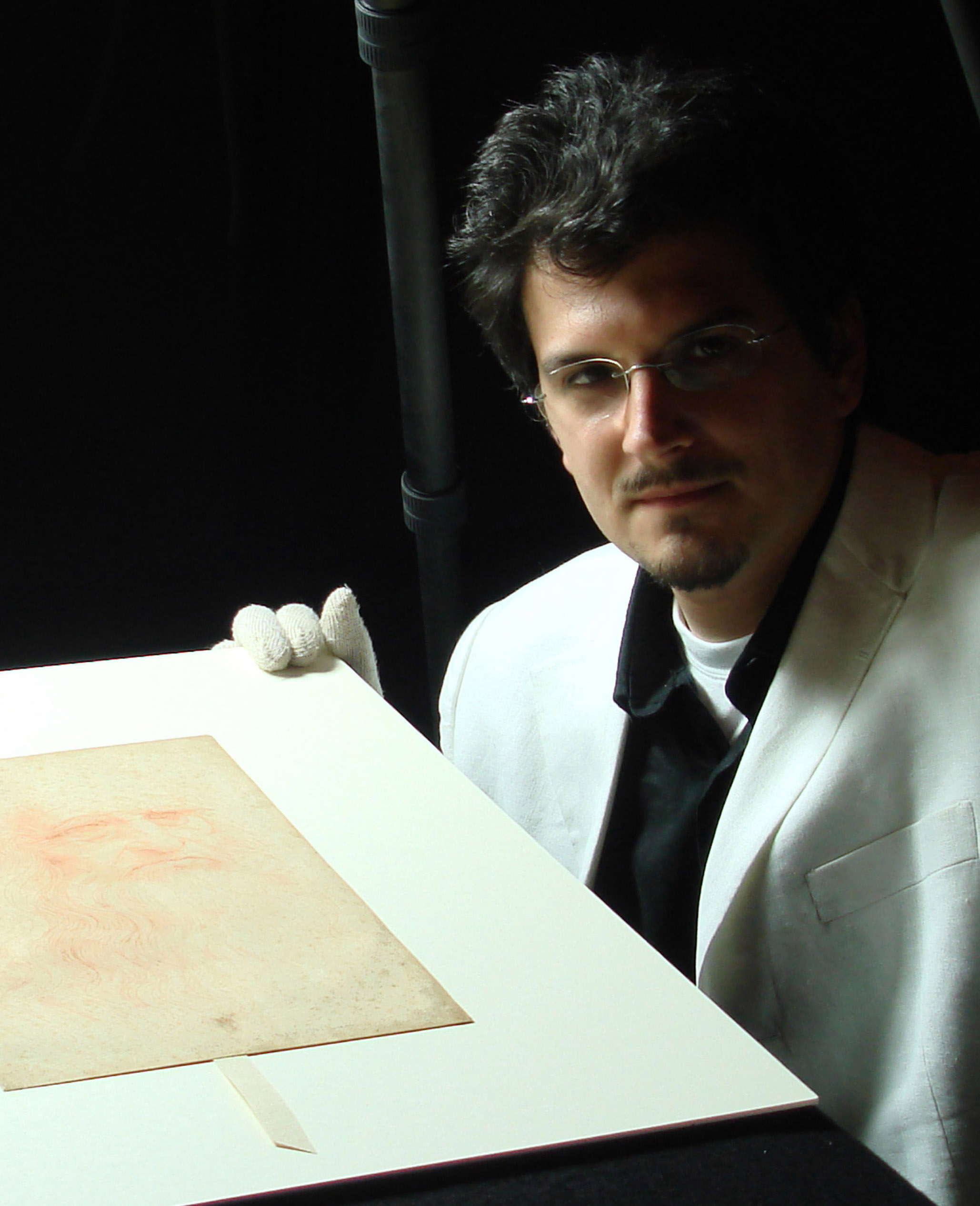
- Born: September 28, 1972; Bologna, Italy
- Known for: Leonardo da Vinci scholar
- Children: 1

Mario Taddei (born September 28, 1972) is an Italian academic. He is an expert in multimedia and edutainment for museums, a Leonardo da Vinci devotee and scholar, and an expert in the codexes and machines of da Vinci and ancient books of technology.

== Biography ==
Born in Bologna, Italy, Taddei graduated in Industrial Design, Politecnico di Milano. He has headed many projects about innovative installations for museums. He has been studying da Vinci for years and has authored new discoveries.

In 2008, he studied for the first time in depth The Book of Secrets (Kitab al-Asrar) by the 1000 CE Arabic engineer and scientist Ibn Khalaf al-Muradi. The complete and unique study of all The Book of Secrets, all his machines and the pages are shown in the Museum of Islamic Art in Doha. In 2013 was co-founder of Leonardo3 Museum in Milan Italy. In 2013 During the event for the 150th anniversary of the Milan Polytechnic he received the CULTURE award with the following motivation: “Minds Shaping the World welcomes Mario Taddei among its members for the scientific rigor and the extraordinary diffusion capacity that allowed him to make unprecedented discoveries to Leonardo da Vinci and spread them all over the world. Mario Taddei is considered today one of the greatest international experts of the genius of Vinci: his exhibitions and installations have been over the years presented with great success both in Italy and abroad (Germany, USA, Canada, Mexico, Brazil, Qatar, Japan)."

In 2023 he received The "Leonardo Da Vinci 2023 Honorary Award" in San Francisco.

Professor of Design, Architecture, Virtual scenography & Virtual reality, ACME Academy of Fine Arts and Media Leonardo da Vinci (Milan) and Pantheon institute (Milan)

== Prizes, awards, reviews ==
- 2005 eScience Category Award - World summit on information technology Geneva 2003 – Tunis 2005
- 2005 Telecom Award "Contagiare Bellezza," Italy
- 2010 ARCA International Award, Italy
- 2013 CULTURE Prize from Polytechnic of Milan (150 year anniversary) Alumnipolim awards 2013.
- 2019 Best Exhibition Event (Gold) -Best Cultural Event (Silver) (Hong Kong)
- 2020 Professions of the future: virtual architects and set designers(Politecnic of Milan)
- 2023 The Leonardo Da Vinci 2023 Honorary Award, San Francisco, USA

== Exhibitions ==
- 2019 Think Like Leonardo da Vinci -香港創新基金呈獻 : 奧海城 想 ‧ 像達文西500週年展 - Olympian City 2, Hong Kong
- 2019 The Lion of Leonardo da Vinci, Le Lion mécanique de Léonard de Vinci, Istituto Italiano di Cultura IIC (Paris)
- 2019 Exposición Da Vinci 500, Universidad Pontificia Bolivariana, Medellin Colombia
- 2016 Davinci Codex Seoul South Korea

== Work ==
=== The robot of Leonardo ===
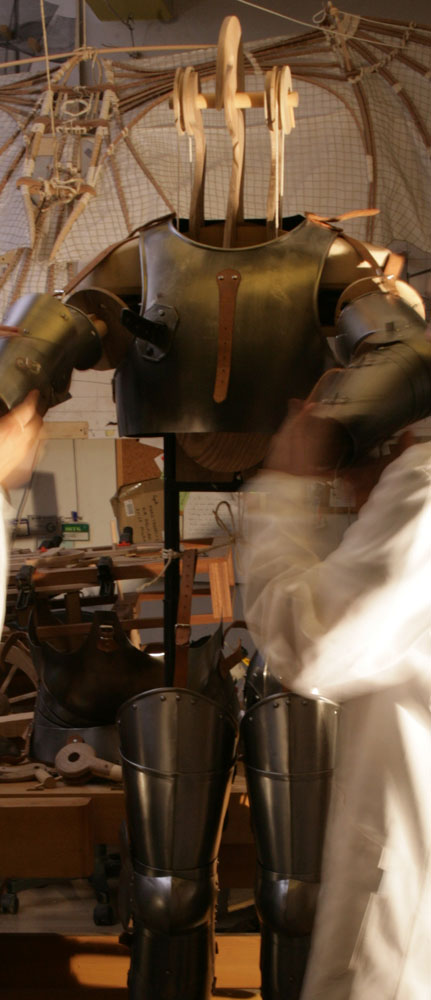
Building the robot of Leonardo da Vinci in the Leonardo3lab.

Among the vast number of projects of Leonardo, there is a “mechanical knight” that has entered into the common imagination. Studies on the subject mention that manuscripts relating to Leonardo’s idea for the robot are in the Codex Atlanticus, specifically folio 579r. Mario Taddei's further research indicated folios 1077r, 1021r and 1021v as possible sources for the mechanisms of this mysterious humanoid robot.

In the 2007 Mario Taddei made a new research on the original documents of Leonardo finding new pieces of information to build a new model of the soldier robot, correctly related to the drawings of Leonardo. The Model is shown in exhibition around the world and the work of research is published in the "Leonardo da Vinci's robots" book.

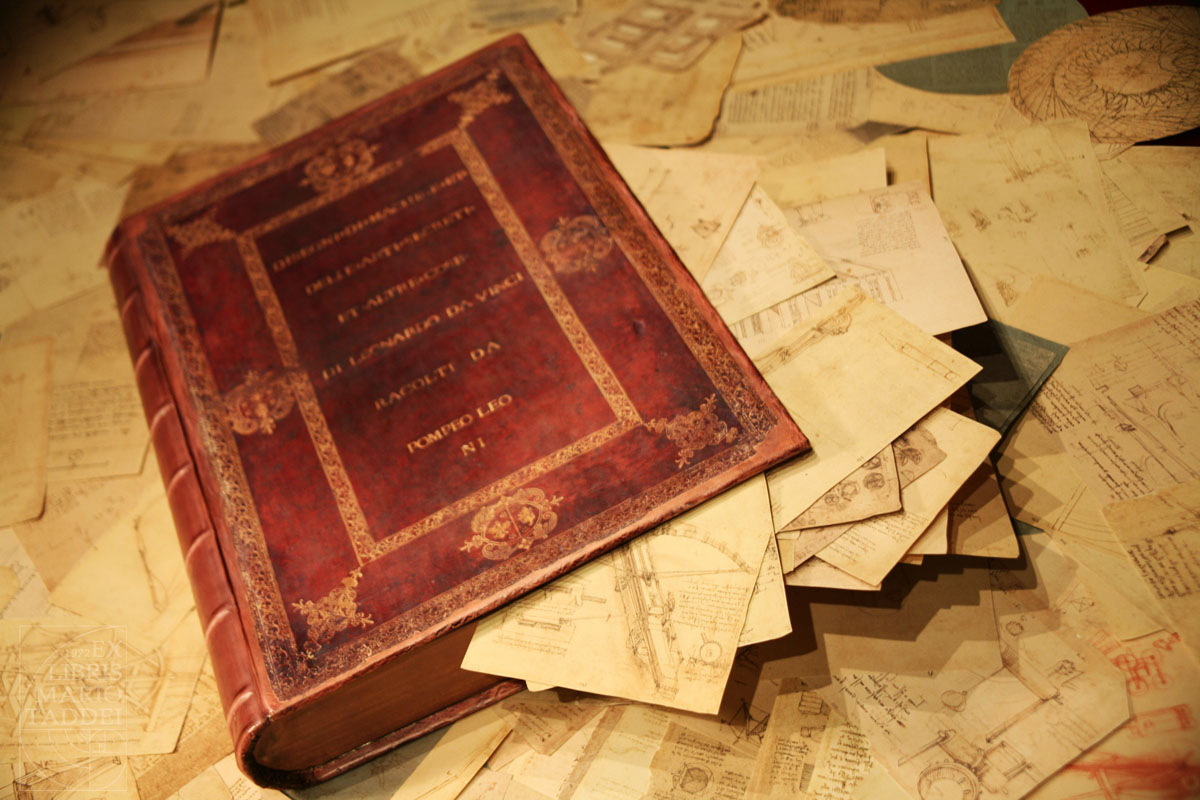
The rebuilt copy of Leonardo da Vinci's Codex Atlanticus as a box. Made by Mario Taddei for museum purposes.

== Books ==
- Taddei Mario, Edoardo Zanon: "Creare videogiochi ". Ed. Jackson Libri 2002. 300 p. ISBN 88-256-2030-6
- Taddei, E. Zanon, Bernardoni: "Leonardo, Water and the Renaissance ". Ed. Federico Motta 2004. 120 pp. ISBN 88-7179-430-3
- Taddei, E. Zanon, Laurenza: "Leonardo's Machines. Secrets and Inventions in the Da Vinci Codices ". Ed. Giunti Editore 2005. 240 pp. ISBN 0-7153-2444-6
- Taddei, E. Zanon, Laurenza: "Leonardo's Machines: Da Vinci's Inventions Revealed ". David & Charles PLC 2006. 240 pp. ISBN 88-09-04363-4
- Taddei, E. Zanon, Lisa: "Leonardo da Vinci's Codex Atlanticus". Ed. Leonardo3 2005. 144 p. ISBN 978-88-6048-005-7
- Taddei, E. Zanon, Pinotti: "Rappresentazioni Grafiche". Ed. Atlas 2005. 336 p. ISBN 978-88-6048-000-2
- Taddei, E. Zanon, Bernardoni: "Leonardo bridges". Ed. Leonardo3 2005. 144 p. ISBN 978-88-6048-000-2
- Taddei, E. Zanon, Lisa: "Leonardo's workshop". Ed. Leonardo3 2006. 160 p. ISBN 978-88-6048-002-6
- Taddei Mario: "Las maquinas de Leonardo". Ed. Leonardo3 2006. 160 p. ISBN 9788430556694
- Taddei Mario: "Машины Леонардо да Винчи. Тайны и изобретения в рукописях ученого". Ed. Ниола-Пресс 200t. ISBN 978-5-366-00338-4
- Taddei, E. Zanon, Lisa: "The Book of Secrets (Kitab al-Asrar)". Ed. Leonardo3 2007. 420 p. ISBN 978-88-6048-013-2
- Taddei Mario: "Da Vinci 's Robots. Self-propelling cart". Ed. Leonardo3 2008. 480 p.+16 p. ISBN 978-88-6048-009-5)
- Taddei Mario: "Da Vinci 's Robots. New mechanics and new automata found in codices". Ed. Leonardo3 2008. 480 p. ISBN 978-88-6048-008-8
- Taddei Mario: "Atlas ilustrado de las máquinas de Leonardo secretos e invenciones en los Códices da Vinci". Ed. Susaeta 2009. 480 p. ISBN 9788430556694
- Taddei Mario: "Illustrated Atlas of Leonardo’s Robots La mecanica y los nuevos automatia encontrados en los codices ". Ed. Susaeta 2009. 480 p. ISBN 8467704128
- Taddei Mario "The Last Supper. Secrets, techniques and errors of a masterpiece as never seen before". Ed. Leonardo3 2007. 420 p. ISBN 978-88-6048-017-0
- Taddei Mario "圖解達文西機器人". Ed. 出版日期 2010. 300p. ISBN 9789866363733
- Taddei Mario "Secret Note of Leonardo da Vinci – 다빈치의 비밀노트". Ed. UNJUNSA 2017. 300 p. ISBN 9788970301150
- Taddei Mario, Paolo Mosca: "LEONARDO DA VINCI È MORTO! Come fare soldi con l’ARTE DIGITALE e gli NFT". Ed. Amazon 2021. 204 p. ISBN 979-8525055032
- Taddei Mario, Paolo Mosca: "LEONARDO DA VINCI IS DEAD - How to make money with DIGITAL ART and NFT". Ed. Amazon 2021. 188 p. ISBN 979-8542166650
- Taddei Mario, "LEONARDO DA VINCI & LA REALTA’ VIRTUALE DALLA GIOCONDA AL METAVERSO". Ed. Amazon 2021. 190 p. ISBN 979-8779181631
- Taddei Mario, "LEONARDO DA VINCI & VIRTUAL REALITY - FROM MONA LISA TO THE METAVERSE". Ed. Amazon 2021. 190 p. ISBN 979-8796061497
- Taddei Mario, "I ROBOT E L'ANDROIDE DI LEONARDO DA VINCI". Ed. Amazon 2021. 170 p. ISBN 979-8541060010
- Taddei Mario, "THE ROBOTS AND ANDROID OF LEONARDO DA VINCI". Ed. Amazon 2021. 170 p. ISBN 979-8795402864
- Taddei Mario, "1651 TRATTATO DELLA PITTURA DI LEONARDO DA VINCI - editio princeps". Ed. Amazon 2023. 154 p. ISBN 979-8373637985
- Taddei Mario, "AI - Intelligenza Artificiale Creativa - Rivoluzione - Inganno - Strumento: ChatGPT, Dalle-E, Midjourney, Stable Diffusion. Tutorial, consigli". Ed. Amazon 2023. 212 p. ISBN 979-8387322990
- Taddei Mario, "Leonardo da Vinci. The Last Supper 3D". Ed. Giunti 2023. 160 p. ISBN 978-8809935860
- Taddei Mario, "Leonardo da Vinci. Il Cenacolo 3D". Ed. Giunti 2023. 160 p. ISBN 978-8809935853
- Taddei Mario: "1586 LA ANATOMIA DEL CORPO UMANO di Valverde completa: Anastatica completa, con le tavole proibite, analisi e ricostruzioni 3D". Ed. Amazon 2024. 438p. ISBN 979-8878927543
- Taddei Mario: "1586 Valverde's ANATOMY OF THE HUMAN BODY complete: Complete anastatic, with forbidden plates, analysis and 3D reconstructions". Ed. Amazon 2024. 438p. ISBN 979-8883249180
- Taddei Mario: "Leonardo da Vinci. Le macchine 3D". Ed. Giunti 2024. 240 p. ISBN 978-8809935839
- Taddei Mario: "Les machines de Léonard de Vinci: De nouvelles études pour découvrir ses inventions". Ed. Gründ 2024. 240 p. ISBN 978-2324036033
- Taddei Mario: "Leonardo da Vinci. The 3D machines". Ed. Giunti 2024. 240 p. ISBN 978-8809935846
- Taddei Mario: "MICHELANGELO, PASSIONE E POESIA: Rime, pensieri e confessioni illustrate con opere inedite e fantastiche, tra mistero, amore e sofferenza dell’artista universale". Ed. Amazon 2025. 210 p. ISBN 979-8296457332
- Taddei Mario: "MICHELANGELO, PASSION AND POETRY: Illustrated Rhymes, Reflections, and Confessions with New and Fantastical Artworks, Exploring the Mystery, Love, and Torment of a Timeless Genius". Ed. Amazon 2025. 210 p. ISBN 979-8296755186
- Taddei Mario, Song Yingxing: "1637 The Secrets of Ancient China: Harnessing the Works of Nature - 天工開物 Tiangong Kaiwu: Facsimile edition with analysis and commentary". Ed. Amazon 2025. 514 p. ISBN 979-8315089148
- Taddei Mario, Song Yingxing: "1637 I segreti dell'antica Cina - Utilizzare le Opere della Natura 天工開物 Tiangong Kaiwu: Edizione anastatica dell’opera con analisi e commenti". Ed. Amazon 2025. 514 p. ISBN 979-8315055983
- Taddei Mario, Giacomo Barozzi Vignola: "Regola dei Cinque Ordini di Architettura — Vignola 1562–1736 Facsimile Tavole Restaurate, Studi e Ricostruzioni 3D: Due edizioni storiche a confronto". Ed. Amazon 2025. 208 p. ISBN 979-8283724690
- Taddei Mario, Giacomo Barozzi Vignola: "The Rule of the Five Orders of Architecture — Vignola 1562–1736 Restored Facsimiles, Studies and 3D Reconstructions". Ed. Amazon 2025. 208 p. ISBN 979-8283844121
- Taddei Mario: "SAPIENS.EXE: Storia, saggi, racconti e profezie sull’apocalisse dell’intelligenza artificiale, la rivoluzione tecnologica in attesa della singolarità". Ed. Amazon 2025. 160 p. ISBN 979-8276465449
