= Citadel of Safed =

Citadel in Safed, Northern Israel

- מצודת צפת (Hebrew)
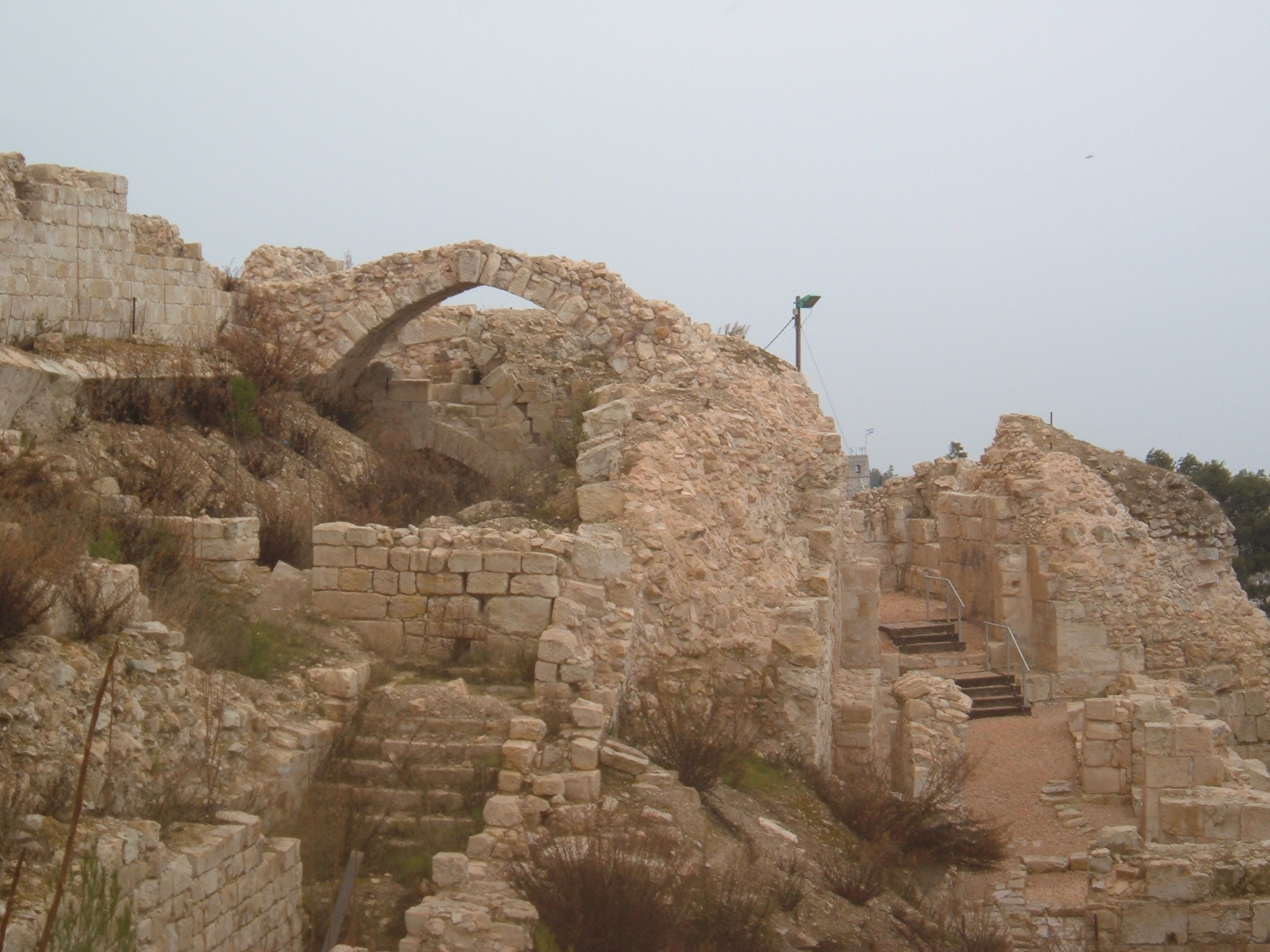
- Interactive map of Citadel of Safed
- 32°58′04″N 35°29′43″E
- Cultures: Second Temple, Crusader, Mamluk

Site notes
- Architectural styles: Prominent: Gothic, Mamluk

The Citadel of Safed (also styled Saphet) is a ruined castle above the modern city of Safed, Israel. It stands on the site of fortifications from the late period of the Second Temple as well as the Roman Empire. However most of the remains left in the place are from the Crusader, Mamluk and Ottoman periods. The citadel was an important administrative center of the crusaders. The citadel was severely damaged in the strong earthquake that struck Safed in 1837. During the last few decades, extensive archaeological excavations have been carried out at the site, revealing remains and ancient findings from all periods of the citadel's existence. The citadel garden was established in 1950, designed by landscape architect Shlomo Oren Weinberg. A memorial was erected to the Safed residents who lost their lives in the 1948 Palestine War.

== Ancient history ==
In excavations conducted in the area of Giv'at HaMitzuda, evidence of the existence of a Canaanite settlement from the Bronze Age was discovered. Characteristic burial caves for the period were exposed, indicating that burial practices at the site spanned over several centuries. Additionally, remnants from the Iron Age, contemporaneous with the Israelites' settlement in the land according to biblical narrative, were found after they entered the region. While the city of Safed is within the borders of the inheritance of the tribe of Naphtali, it is not mentioned in the Bible, at least not by that name.

== First Jewish Roman War ==
In anticipation of the Great Revolt, Galilee commander Yosef ben Matityahu decided to build a number of strong fortresses in strategically important locations in the Galilee. In his work 'The Jewish Wars', Yosef enumerates that he fortified 'Sela Akbara, Safed, Yavne'el, and Meron'. Safed is likely the fortress mentioned. Yosef chose to build the fortress on the mountain adjacent to Safed, a peak that rises 834 meters above sea level, overlooking its surroundings with abundant slopes. In this way, he aimed to protect the Jewish settlement from Roman soldiers expected to attempt to conquer the Galilee initially.

== Crusader period ==
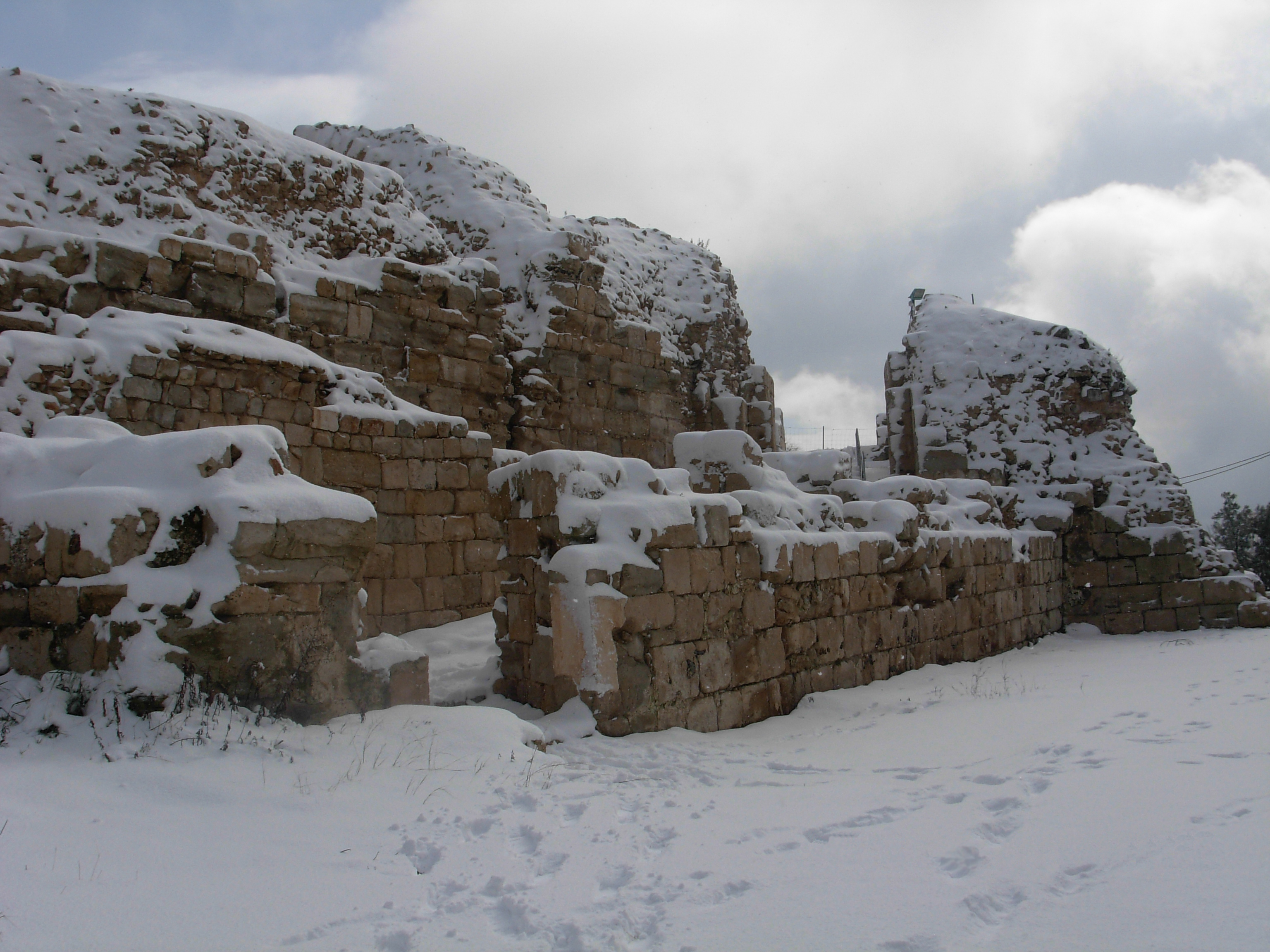
The ruins under snow.

Prior to the Crusader period, the tower was known as Burj Yatim, and described by thirteenth-century Muslim historian Ibn Shaddad as standing above a "flourishing village." Although Ibn Shaddad ascribes the tower's creation to the Knights Templar, it was most likely built during the early Muslim period, before the creation of the Templars. William of Tyre, a Frankish chronicler, noted this tower, or burgus, in 1157, which he referred to as 'Sephet' or 'Castrum Sephet.' In 1102, a fortress was first constructed. In 1140, the fortress was expanded under the orders of Fulk of Anjou, the King of Jerusalem. In 1168 King Amalric I purchased the castle, reinforced its defenses, and instructed the transfer of the stronghold to the care of the Knights Templar, who held it for two decades. The reconstruction of the fortified citadel by the Templars lasted two and a half years and cost over a million gold coins.

In 1187, Saladin annihilated the crusader army in the Battle of Hattin. Nevertheless, the Templars continued to hold the fortress for an additional year and a half until December 1188. After an extended siege and the retreat of the crusaders, the fortress finally succumbed to Muslim forces. The fortress remained under Ayyubid control for approximately fifty years. Al-Mu'azzam Isa, emir of Damascus, ordered the castle to be destroyed during the 1218-1219 siege of Damietta to prevent it from falling into crusader hands.

In 1240, the crusaders returned to Safed, according to diplomatic agreements between Theobald I of Navarre and al-Salih Ismail, then emir of Damascus. They rebuilt and transformed the fortress into one of the largest crusader citadels in the Middle East. A follower of the bishop of Marseille Benoît d'Alignan wrote De constructione castri Saphet, a detailed report on the fortress and its siege in 1264, describing a citadel which sprawled over an area of about forty dunams, with a length of 252 meters and a width of 112 meters, surrounded by a double wall for comprehensive defense. The circumference of the inner wall reached 580 meters, with a height of 28 meters, while the outer wall had a circumference of approximately 850 meters and a height of 28 meters. Between the walls, a trench was excavated at a depth of 15–18 meters and a width of 13 meters (the outer trench currently crosses Jerusalem Street). Seven solid towers, 26 meters high, were built in the outer wall to safeguard the citadel. The fortress itself included numerous structures, such as walls with fixed arrow slits, a suspended gate tower, vaulted halls, numerous rooms, and wells.

The Templars effectively utilized the fortress. Historian Abu al-Fida reports in his book Compendium of Human History or Chronicles that there were eighty knights, servants, and fifteen commanders stationed in the citadel. Each of them had fifty orders, as well as laborers. With the capture of the fortress, it housed a thousand knights. Estimates suggest that during times of peace, around 1,700 people resided there, and during wartime, approximately 2,200 individuals.

Historian Shams al-Din al-Uthmani wrote in 1372: "The fortress of Safed was among the most robust of the Frankish fortifications and was the one most closely tied to the Muslims. The Templars resided in it, knights like real eagles, ready to launch raids on cities from Damascus to Daria, [likely Deiraya in the southern Hebron hills] and its surroundings, and from Jerusalem to Karak, and its region."

From the Crusader period, impressive remnants have been uncovered: a hall with a Gothic vault, similar to those found at Montfort and other places; columns adorned with floral motifs, resembling those found in other Crusader fortresses in the Middle East; a straight wall made of hewn stones, 25 meters long and 2 meters wide, with arrow slits and loopholes; an octagonal wall, 6 meters long and 3.2 meters wide; wide stones with engraved figures of a gargoyle and a sundial; paved passages with drainage channels; a well plastered with lime to prevent water leakage, and more.

== Mamluk period ==
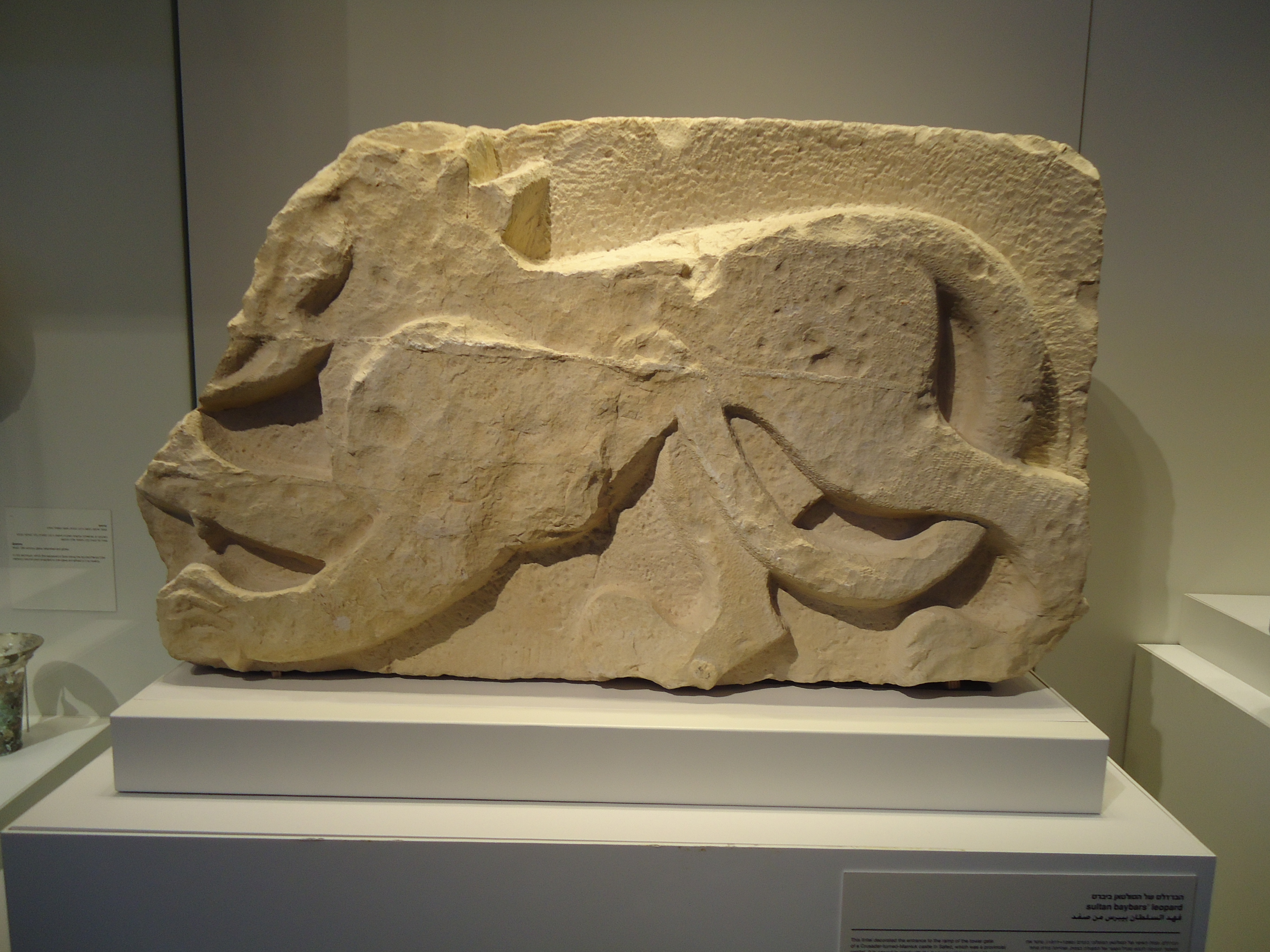
Symbol of Sultan Baybars found in the fortress of Safed. Currently housed in the Israel Museum.

In 1266, the army of the Mamluk Sultan Baibars besieged the fortress of Safed. On July 23, after six weeks of siege, the Mamluks successfully captured the fortress and slaughtered its defenders. The conquerors, who turned Safed into the capital of the Galilee district, feared the remaining Crusaders in Acre and also the Mongols who, at that time, had seized substantial parts of Asia. These concerns prompted the Mamluks to initiate an impressive reconstruction in the fortress.

The additions made by the Mamluks to the fortress of Safed are described in detail in the book of Al-Otmani. According to him, two giant towers were added to the fortress; one is a round victory tower, resembling a chess piece, in the southern part of the fortress. Its dimensions were enormous by all standards: 60 meters in height and 35 meters in diameter. Inside the tower, a massive well was dug, supplying drinking water to thousands of soldiers in the fortress. The remnants of the tower and the well are now located beneath the monument at the summit of the fortress.

The second tower built by Bibars is a solid gate tower, measuring 15 by 20 meters, in the southwest of the fortress. Remnants of this tower also exist to this day.

The Arab geographer al-Dimashqi, who wrote his book "Selected Times and Wonders on Land and Sea" in the year 1300, and also described the Mamluk fortress.

From the Mamluk period, numerous additional remnants have been discovered, shedding light on the extent of their investment in the fortress: utility buildings connected by a rectangular corridor; a paved access road to the gate tower, 24 meters in length and 7–8 meters in width; arches and archivolts; large square stones, one of which bears the carved image of a roaring lion, likely a symbol of Sultan Baybars; a circular well, with a depth of 10.5 meters and a diameter of 10 meters; many pottery artifacts, some locally made and some imported from various places; Mamluk and Venetian coins, and more. Facilities suitable for artistic activity have also been discovered, dating to the late Mamluk or early Ottoman period. Additionally, ceramic artifacts from the sixteenth century have been uncovered.

It is assumed that significant Mamluk structures were destroyed in the earthquake that struck the region in 1303. The fortress remained abandoned for a long period, but in 1475, the Mamluk Sultan Qaitbay ordered its renovation and restoration.

== Ottoman period ==
The citadel was refortified in the 18th century by Ali al-Daher, a son the regional strongman and tax farmer Daher al-Umar who governed the town on behalf of his father. Ali's contributions were largely built along the lines of the Crusader-period fortifications, though they are difficult to trace due the heavy damage from the 1837 Galilee earthquake, the theft of stones over the years, and planting of trees.

== For further reading ==
- Denys Pringle, Safad, in Secular buildings in the Crusader Kingdom of Jerusalem: an archaeological Gazetteer, Cambridge University Press, (1997), pp. 91–92

== See also ==
- Safed
- Crusader castles
- Mamluk Architecture
- Gothic Architecture

== Bibliography ==
- Ellenblum, R. (2007). Crusader Castles and Modern Histories. Cambridge: Cambridge University Press. ISBN 9781139462556.
- Luz, Nimrod (2014). The Mamluk City in the Middle East: History, Culture, and the Urban Landscape. Cambridge: Cambridge University Press. ISBN 978-1-107-04884-3.
- Petersen, Andrew (2001). A Gazetteer of Buildings in Muslim Palestine (British Academy Monographs in Archaeology). Oxford University Press. ISBN 978-0-19-727011-0. Archived from the original on 2021-05-28.
- Pringle, Denys (1985). "Reconstructing the Castle of Safad". Palestine Exploration Quarterly. 117: 139–49. doi:10.1179/peq.1985.117.2.139.
