= Siege of Safed =

Siege of Safed or Siege of Safad may refer to:

- Siege of Safed (1188), during Saladin's invasion of the Kingdom of Jerusalem
- Siege of Safed (1266), during Baybars' invasion of the Crusader states
