= Great Chronicle of Limoges =

The Great Chronicle of Limoges (French: Grande chronique de Limoges; Latin: Maius chronicon Lemovicense), also called the Chronicle of Saint-Martial of Limoges (French: Chronique de Saint-Martial de Limoges; Latin: Chronicon sancti Martialis Lemovicensis), is a collection of 13th- and 14th-century historical notices and chronicles of Limoges preserved in three related manuscripts. Beginning in the 18th century, the material in the manuscripts was mistakenly perceived as fragments of a single large chronicle of the abbey of Saint-Martial. They were first critically edited as a unified chronicle in the 19th century. They are today recognized mostly as notes made by the monks of Saint-Martial as continuations of the copious historical notes made by Bernard Itier (died 1225).

The three manuscripts from which the Great Chronicle is derived are all now in the Bibliothèque nationale de France:

- MS lat. 11019, historical notes added to the margins from 1310 at Saint-Martial
- MS lat. 5452, compiled in the abbey of Saint-Martin in the late 14th or early 15th century
- MS lat. 12764, copied by the Maurist Claude Estiennot de la Serre in the 17th century

All three manuscripts contain many texts in common, including the chronicle of Saint-Martin by its abbot, Pierre Coral. The first continuation of Bernard Itier, begun in 1310, covers the period 1207–1320, which overlaps with Itier's own notes for the years 1207–1224. The focus of the text is Limoges and Saint-Martial and it begins with the arrival in the city of Franciscans and Dominicans. Two other continuations of Itier's notes made by Hélie Autenc are also included. They cover 1235–1277 and 1274–1315. The first of these relies on the universal chronicle of Gerald Frachet, but the focus of both remains local. There is also a rough attempt at a chronicle covering the years 1235–1299, entitled Brevissimum chronicon in modern editions.

There is no single published edition of all the texts in the three manuscripts, but most of the material has been published.

== Bibliography ==
- Bate, Keith (2010). "Chronicon S. Martialis Lemovicensis (Chronicle of St. Martial of Limoges)". In Graeme Dunphy (ed.). Encyclopedia of the Medieval Chronicle. Vol. 1. Brill. pp. 418–419.
- Becquet, Jean (1990). "Pierre Coral et la chronique de Saint-Martial de Limoges au XIII^{e} siècle". Bulletin de la Société archéologique et historique du Limousin. 118: 32–51.
- Duplès-Agier, Henri (1874). Chroniques de Saint-Martial de Limoges. Société d'Histoire de France.
- Guigniaut, J. D.; de Wailly, J. N., eds. (1855). "Majus Chronicon Lemovicense a Petro Coral et aliis conscriptum". Recueil des Historiens des Gaules et de la France. Vol. 21. Imprimerie royale. pp. 761–802.
- Jones, Chris (2007). Eclipse of Empire? Perceptions of the Western Empire and its Rulers in Late-Medieval France. Brepols.
- Lewis, Andrew W., ed. (2012). The Chronicle and Historical Notes of Bernard Itier. Clarendon Press.
- Rech, Régis (2006). "Le Limousin entre Capétiens et Plantagenêt chez les chroniqueurs de Saint-Martial au XIII^{e} siècle". In Claude Andrault-Schmitt (ed.). Saint-Martial de Limoges: ambition politique et production culturelle (X^{e}–XIII^{e} siècles). Presses Universitaires de Limoges. pp. 115–132.
