= Siege of Safed (1266) =

Siege in the later Crusades

- Part of the Crusades
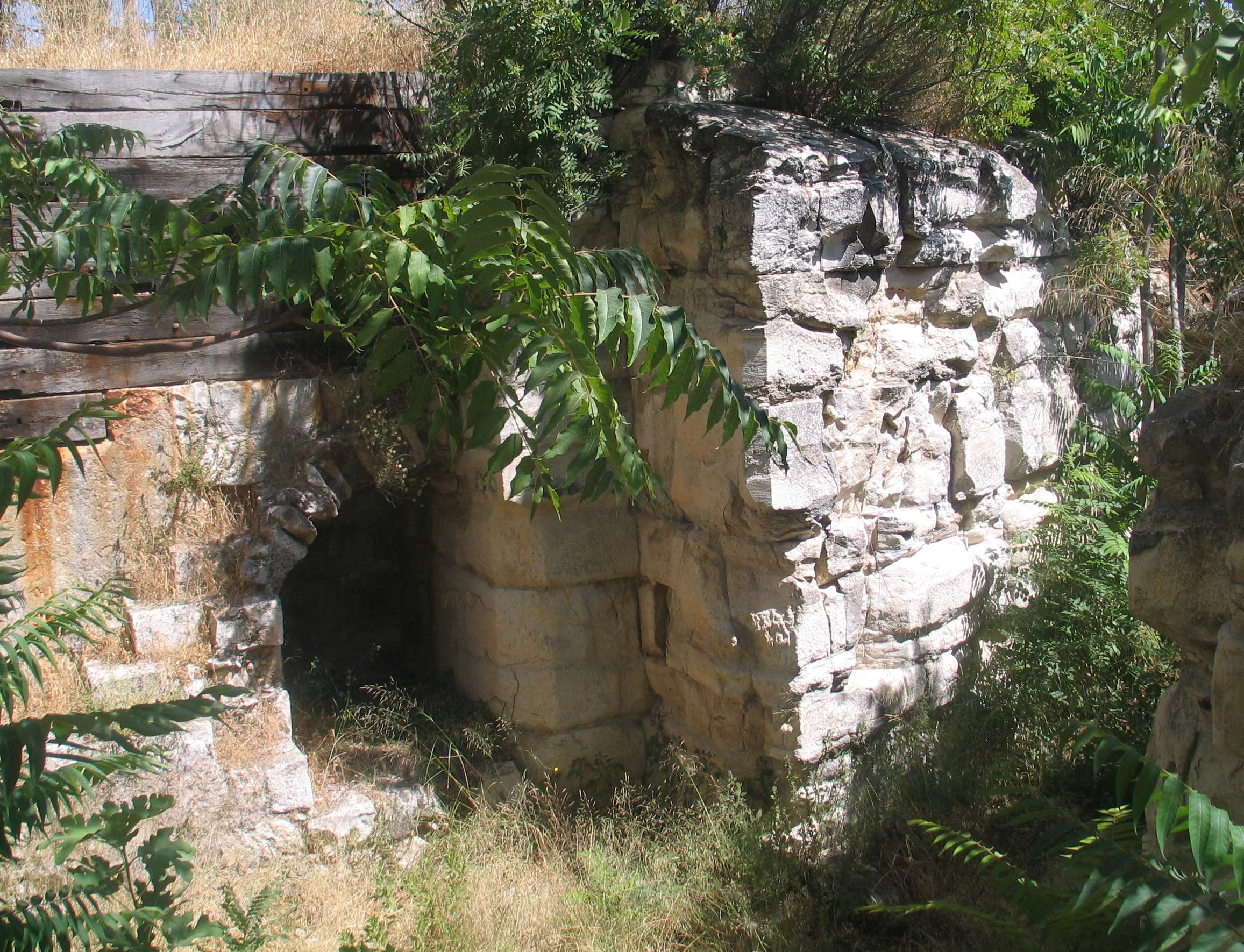
- Remains of the Crusader fortress
Date	13 June – 23 July 1266
Location	Safed
Result	Mamluk victory

Belligerents
Mamluk Sultanate	Knights Templar

Commanders and leaders
Baybars I	

Strength
Unknown	2,000+

Casualties and losses
Unknown	800–2,000

The siege of Safed (13 June – 23 July 1266) was part of the campaign of the Mamluk sultan Baybars I to reduce the Kingdom of Jerusalem. The castle of Safed belonged to the Knights Templar and put up strong resistance. Direct assault, mining and psychological warfare were all employed to force the garrison to surrender. The castle was ultimately captured through treachery and the Templars were massacred. Baybars repaired and garrisoned the castle.

The main sources for the siege from the Muslim perspective are Ibn ʿAbd al-Ẓāhir's biography of Baybars, Badr al-Dīn al-ʿAynī's String of Pearls and to a lesser extent Ibn al-Furāt's History of Dynasties and Kingdoms. From the Christian perspective, there are the Gestes des Chiprois, Estoire d'Eracles, Annales de Terre Sainte and Maius chronicon Lemovicense.

== Preparations ==
According to De constructione castri Saphet, an account of the construction of the castle of Safed probably written around 1260, the peacetime garrison was 1,700 men. This included 50 knights of the Templar Order, 30 brother sergeants and 50 turcopoles (native Syrians) with horses and arms, plus 300 crossbowmen, 820 workers and servants and 400 slaves. In wartime, this should have risen to 2,200. Crossbows, arrows, siege engines and other weapons were manufactured within the castle.

The additional 500 troops prescribed for wartime in De constructione castri Saphet were probably hired mercenaries. The actual size of the garrison at the start of the siege in 1266 is unknown, but it was certainly larger than the 1,700 expected in peacetime. No Templar reinforcements are known to have come to the fortress prior to the siege, but there seems to have been a force of Knights Hospitaller present. The Franciscan vicar-general in the Holy Land, Fidentius of Padua, sent two of his friars to serve the garrison as chaplains. Writing around 1290, Fidentius recalled a garrison of 2,000 men at the start of the siege.

As part of his strategy, Baybars launched several raids throughout Palestine to distract his opponents, confuse them about the main target of the campaign and prevent them from sending reinforcements to Safed. He personally harassed Acre and its vicinity for a week before going to Safed. His forces also raided Tripoli, where they capturing three forts; Tyre, where they took a substantial booty of camels, cattle, sheep and high-ranking prisoners; Sidon; and Montfort, before their full weight was brought against Safed.

== Siege ==
The siege of Safed began on 13 June 1266 (8 Ramadān 664 AH) and lasted six weeks. Baybars' siege engines were constructed near Acre and Damascus and had to be transported overland by camel. Their weight proved too much for the camels, and men of both low rank and high were forced to help move them to Safed. Among the types of engine employed were mangonels, but the engines had to be supplemented by other tactics.

Baybars ordered a preliminary assault on the walls in order to push back the defenders and give the sappers time to drill into the base of the wall and the towers. So-called "dart-casters" threw containers of tar at the gate and burnt it down. The walls were also undermined. At one point, a Templar counter-mine broke through the ceiling of the besiegers' mine, leading to an underground mêlée. The Templars appear to have withdrawn progressively further into the fortress as is outer defences were overcome. According to Ibn al-Furāt, Baybars offered 100 gold dinars each to the men who removed the first ten stones from the wall of the citadel.

With direct assaults causing unacceptable losses, Baybars switched to psychological warfare. He ordered his men to concentrate their attacks solely on the Templars. He sent offers of safe conduct to the Syrian sergeants and archers in order to sow distrust in the garrison. The tactic was successful. A certain Leo, a Syrian Christian brother sergeant described as the castellan in the Chronicon Lemovicense, was sent to seek terms. Baybars informed him that he was not granting terms, but that if Leo convinced the Templars to surrender, he would be spared. As a result of Leo's treachery, the Templars came out in the mistaken belief that they had a safe conduct. In this way the castle fell to Baybars on 23 July 1266 (18 Shawwāl 664 AH).

== Aftermath ==
Baybars did not honour the safe conduct he had induced Leo to present to the Templars. According to Ibn ʿAbd al-Raḥīm and Siegfried of Ballhausen, he ordered the slaughter of some 2,000 Christians. Other sources give the victims as 10 knights, 27 brother sergeants, 767 other soldiers and 4 Franciscan friars. According to the Chronicon Lemovicense, there were 3,000 survivors of the garrison. According to Fidentius of Padua, the garrison had been reduced to 500 or 600 by the time it surrendered. The Hospitallers were spared. The massacre of the Templars was a notable exception to Baybars' usual practice of granting safe conduct to those who surrendered.

After the siege, Leo remained with Baybars and became a Muslim. Baybars had Safed repaired and garrisoned with his own troops. He was still at Safed overseeing the repairs as late as June 1267, when he received an embassy from the Lordship of Tyre. Although an embassy from Lord Philip of Tyre that arrived during the siege the previous year had been rebuffed, Baybars now renewed his truce with Tyre for ten years. Envoys from the Lordship of Beirut had also arrived at the siege of Safed and been rebuffed.

Already in October 1266, Pope Clement IV could mention the fall of Safed when ordering the preaching of a new crusade and the raising of funds for 500 crossbowmen to be sent to the Holy Land by March 1267. The Templars' heroic defence of Safed had become legendary by the early 14th century, when it was cited at the trial of the Templars in Cyprus.

== Bibliography ==
- Boas, Adrian J. (2017). "Archaeological Evidence for the Mamluk Sieges and Dismantling of Montfort: A Preliminary Discussion". In Adrian J. Boas (ed.). Montfort: History, Early Research and Recent Studies of the Principal Fortress of the Teutonic Order in the Latin East. Brill. pp. 41–.
- Holt, P. M. (1995). Early Mamluk Diplomacy (1260–1290): Treaties of Baybars and Qalāwūn with Christian Rulers. E. J. Brill.
- Khamisy, Rabei G. (2017). "Montfort Castle (Qalʿat Al-Qurayn) in Mamluk Sources". In Adrian J. Boas (ed.). Montfort: History, Early Research and Recent Studies of the Principal Fortress of the Teutonic Order in the Latin East. Brill. pp. 28–40.
- Marshall, Christopher (1992). Warfare in the Latin East, 1192–1291. Cambridge University Press.
- Riley-Smith, Jonathan (2014) [1987]. The Crusades: A History (3rd ed.). Bloomsbury.
- Shachar, Uri Zvi (2020). "Enshrined Fortification: A Trialogue on the Rise and Fall of Safed". The Medieval History Journal. 23 (2): 265–290. doi:10.1177/0971945819895898. S2CID 212846031.
- Thorau, Peter (1992). The Lion of Egypt: Sultan Baybars I and the Near East in the Thirteenth Century. Longman.
