= Claude Chantelou =

French Benedictine monk and scholar

Claude Chantelou (1617 in Vion, France – November 28, 1664 in Paris) was a Benedictine Patristic scholar and writer.

Having spent some time in the Order of Fontevrault, he left it to become a Benedictine in the Congregation of Saint-Maur, in which he made his profession, February 7, 1640, at Toulouse. When the General Chapter of 1651 ordained that two religious be entrusted with the preparation of a history of the congregation, Chantelou was one of the appointees, and from that time until his death resided at Saint-Germain-des-Prés.

== Works ==
He is the author of the following works: Bibliotheca Patrum ascetica (Paris, 1661–64), a collection of extracts from the writings of the Church Fathers regarding the spiritual life; S. Benedicti abbatis Clarevallensis Paræneticon (Paris, 1662), an edition of sermons of St. Bernard preceded by a life of the saint written by Alain, Bishop of Auxerre (a life of St. Malachy, Archbishop of Armagh, concludes the work); S. Basilii Cæsareæ Cappadociæ archiepiscopi regularum fusius disputatarum liber (Paris, 1664), answers of St. Basil to questions proposed by his monks respecting the monastic life; Carte géographique de la France bénédictine, published by Le Chevalier in 1726. Marin de Caraurais edited and completed Chantelou's manuscript, History of the Abbey of Montmajour, near Arles (Marseilles, 1878). Nobilleau published his Analyses du cartulaire tourangeau de Marmoutier (Tours, 1879). Chantelou was also a collaborator in the publication of important Benedictine historical collections, e.g. the Spicilegium of Luc d'Achery.
