= Siege of Damascus (1229) =

Part of Ayyubid was of succession

Date	March/May 1229 – 15 June 1229
Location	Damascus
Result	Ayyubid victory

Belligerents
Ayyubid Sultanate	Emirate of Damascus

Commanders and leaders
al-Kāmil al-Ashraf	al-Nāṣir Dāʾūd

The siege of Damascus in 1229 was part of an Ayyubid succession war over Damascus that broke out following the death of al-Muʿaẓẓam I in 1227. The late ruler's son, al-Nāṣir Dāʾūd, took de facto control of the city in opposition to al-Kāmil, the Ayyubid sultan in Egypt. In the ensuing war, al-Nāṣir lost Damascus but preserved his autonomy, ruling from al-Karak.

== Sources and background ==
The main sources for the siege are Ibn Wāṣil's Mufarrij and Taʾrīkh al-Ṣāliḥī, Abū Shāma's al-Dhayl ʿalaʾl-rawḍatayn, Ibn al-Athīr's al-Kāmil fi ʾl-tāʾrīkh, Kamāl al-Dīn Ibn al-ʿAdīm' Zubdat al-Ḥalab min tāʾrīkh Ḥalab, Sibṭ ibn al-Jawzī's Mirʾāt al-Zamān, Ibn Abi ʾl-Dam's al-Shamārīkh and al-Makīn ibn al-ʿAmīd's chronicle. Ibn Wāṣil, Abū Shāma and Sibṭ ibn al-Jawzī were eyewitnesses of the siege. Abū Shāma provides the most precise dating.

Within the Ayyubid realm, the sultan of Egypt was suzerain over the emir of Damascus, although the latter was largely autonomous. When al-Muʿaẓẓam I died in 1227, he was succeeded by his son, al-Nāṣir Dāʾūd, without any opposition from the sultan, al-Kāmil. This soon changed. When the sultan moved north in 1229 to confront the army of the Sixth Crusade, he planned to secure Damascus as well. To that end, while negotiating with the crusaders, he also opened negotiations with his brother al-Ashraf, who agreed to cede Ḥarrān to al-Kāmil in exchange for Damascus, after the latter was taken from al-Nāṣir, who immediately showed his intention to resist. In the negotiation with the crusaders, al-Kāmil promised access to Jerusalem in exchange for European pressure on Damascus to submit to Egypt's authority.

== Siege ==
=== al-Ashraf's attack (March–May) ===
In March 1229, al-Ashraf marched up to the walls of Damascus. He had under his command his personal troops, a contingent from Aleppo, the army of Homs and troops of al-Ṣāliḥ Ismāʿīl and al-Mughīth Maḥmūd. He was not equipped for an assault or a siege and probably intended only to pen up al-Nāṣir Dāʾūd. He cut off the two streams that supplied the city with water, but a sally by the garrison supported by local volunteers restored them. The suburbs of Qaṣr Ḥajjaj and Shaghur were burnt in the subsequent fighting.

In response to repeated calls for reinforcements from al-Ashraf, al-Kāmil sent 2,000 regular cavalry in two contingents under Fakhr al-Dīn ibn al-Shaykh and al-Muẓaffar Maḥmūd. These probably arrived in late March or early April. The troops of Homs loyal to the Emir al-Mujāhid Shīrkūh thus fought side by side with the pretender to Homs, al-Muẓaffar Maḥmūd.

In response to the attack engineered by al-Kāmil, al-Nāṣir Dāʾūd ordered Sibṭ ibn al-Jawzī to preach a sermon in the Umayyad Mosque denouncing the treaty of Jaffa finalized in February between the sultan and the Christian emperor Frederick II. Al-Kāmil probably delayed going to Damascus in person so as to supervise the fulfillment of the treaty. In late April, possibly earlier, he finally march north with the bulk of the army of Egypt.

=== al-Kāmil's siege (May–June) ===
The Egyptian army arrived on 6 May and al-Kāmil encamped near the mosque of Qadam. The following day, al-Nāṣir sent two envoys, the fuqahāʾ Jamāl al-Dīn al-Hasirī and Shams al-Dīn ibn al-Shīrāzī, to the sultan to discuss terms. On 8 May, representatives met for formal negotiations. Al-Kāmil's representative was ʿImād al-Dīn, brother of Fakhr al-Dīn, while al-Nāṣir was represented by ʿIzz al-Dīn Aybak.

Negotiations soon broke down. On 13 May, there was heavy fighting in the suburb by the Bāb Tūmā. It was burnt. A week later, al-Nāṣir expelled the refugees from the Ghūṭa because the city did not have enough provisions for them. By 3 June, the besiegers had completely surrounded the city and controlled all territory up to the walls. Nevertheless, al-Nāṣir launched daily sallies against the enemy front lines without success.

During the siege, al-Kāmil launched a strike against al-Karak, where al-Nāṣir's mother was staying. She ordered a sortie, which scattered the strike force and captured its commanders, two former emirs of al-Muʿaẓẓam.

=== al-Nāṣir's defence ===
The population of Damascus played an energetic role in its defence. Ibn Wāṣil credits this to their devotion to al-Nāṣir and his late father, al-Muʿaẓẓam. The Damascenes were almost certainly also fighting for the autonomy or independence that only a local dynasty could provide. The local militias that took part in the siege of 1229 are never heard of again.

There were two instances of dissension within the city. A small detachment of the Damascene army deserted to the enemy, and al-Nāṣir imprisoned his kātib (secretary) Fakhr al-Quḍāt and his cousin al-Mukarram on suspicion of conspiring with the enemy. The most serious problem for al-Nāṣir, however, was his lack of money, since his treasury was in al-Karak. He quickly used up his local funds and had to melt down his gold and silver to mint coin. The jewellery and fine clothing of the women of his court he sold, but he did not extort a loan from the merchants of the city.

== Surrender on terms ==
On 14 June, al-Nāṣir secretly slipped out of Damascus with a small guard entered the besiegers' camp to seek terms. He was ordered back into the city. On 16 June, Fakhr al-Dīn arrived at the citadel to escort him to al-Kāmil. A peace treaty was signed and al-Nāṣir returned to the city. The gates of Damascus were opened on 25 June 1229 to al-Kāmil and the Egyptian army.

According to the terms of the treaty, al-Nāṣir would govern Transjordan, the Jordan Valley between the Dead Sea and the Sea of Galilee, the city of Nablus and the districts around Jerusalem, which city al-Kāmil had handed over to Frederick II in the treaty of Jaffa. Al-Kāmil would retain control of Ascalon, Gaza, Hebron, Tiberias and the Transjordanian castle of al-Shawbak. ʿIzz al-Dīn Aybak retained his iqṭāʿ of Ṣalkhad. After a short while, al-Kāmil relinquished Damascus to al-Ashraf, who went on to seize Baalbek.

== Bibliography ==
- Burns, Ross (2005). Damascus: A History. Routledge.
- Drory, Joseph (2003). "Al-Nāsir Dāwūd: A Much Frustrated Ayyūbid Prince". Al-Masāq. 15 (2): 161–187. doi:10.1080/0950311032000117467. S2CID 155744029.
- Humphreys, R. Stephen (1977). From Saladin to the Mongols: The Ayyubids of Damascus, 1193–1260. State University of New York Press.
- Slack, Corliss K. (2013). Historical Dictionary of the Crusades. Scarecrow Press. ISBN 978-0-8108-7830-3.
