= Ibn al-Jawzi (disambiguation) =

Ibn al-Jawzi may refer to:

- Abu'l-Faraj ibn al-Jawzi (1116–1201), Arab historian and Hanbali jurist
- Sibt ibn al-Jawzi (died 1256), Arab scholar and Hanafi jurist, grandson of Abu-al-Faraj ibn al-Jawzi
- Ibn Qayyim al-Jawziyya (1292–1350), Arab scholar
