= Nicolas Marie Thérèse Jolyclerc =

French Benedictine and botanist (1746-1817)

Nicolas Marie Thérèse Jolyclerc (1746, Lyon – 6 February 1817, Paris) was a French Benedictine and botanist.

He belonged to the Congregation of Saint Maur in Lyon. At the time of the Revolution, he left the church and became an instructor of botany, first in Tulle (Corrèze) and later at the École centrale de l'Oise in Beauvais.

As an instructor in Beauvais, he gave a course in botany attended by young girls. Reportedly, after explaining the role of reproductive organs in plants, his female students were distressed to the extent that the affronted mothers withdrew their daughters from the course.

== Published works ==
He was the author of "Systeme sexuel des vegetaux: Suivant les classes, les ordres, les genres et les especes" (1798), a French translation of Linnaeus's work on plant systematics. In 1797 he released an augmented edition of Joseph Pitton de Tournefort's "Élémens de botanique". Other significant writings by Jolyclerc include:

- Apologie des prêtres mariés, ou Abus du célibat prouvé aux prêtres catholiques par l'Évangile, par la raison et par les faits (Paris, 1797).
- Principes de la philosophie du botaniste, ou Dictionnaire interprète et raisonné des principaux préceptes et des termes que la botanique, la médecine, la physique, la chimie et l'agriculture ont consacrés à l'étude... des plantes. (Paris, 1797).
- Phytologie universelle, ou Histoire naturelle et méthodique des plantes... (with others, 5 volumes) Paris, (1799).
- Cours de minéralogie, rapporté au tableau méthodique des minéraux, etc. (Paris, 1802).
- Dictionnaire raisonné et abrégé d'histoire naturelle, par d'anciens professeurs : ouvrage consacré aux progrès des sciences, de l'agriculture et des arts. Paris : Chez Fournier frères, imprimeurs-libraires, rue des Rats, no 14, MDCCCVII (1807).
