= Trinity Abbey, Vendôme =

Benedictine monastery in Vendôme, France

Coordinates: 47°47′28″N 1°4′8″E

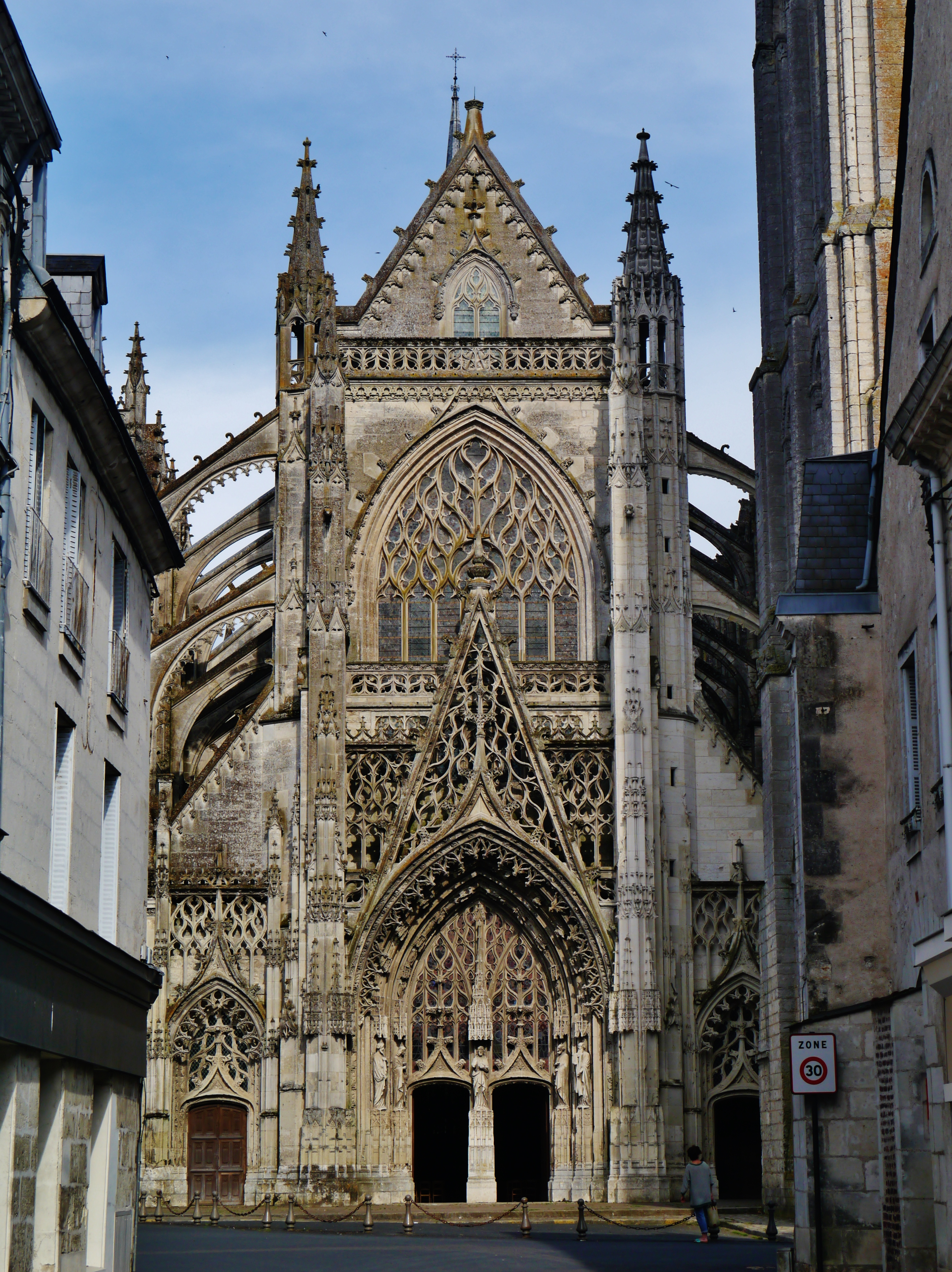
West façade with flamboyant tracery

Trinity Abbey, Vendôme, was a Benedictine monastery founded in 1035 in Vendôme by Geoffrey Martel and his first wife, Agnes of Burgundy. It was consecrated on 31 May 1040, one month before Geoffrey became Count of Anjou.

The abbey was under the direct authority of the Pope and nobody else. This fact was accepted by Thierry of Chartres and by King Henry I of France in 1056. In 1063, its abbot was given the rights of being a cardinal. It was often in conflict with the counts of Vendôme and some, like Geoffrey Jordan, were excommunicated.

In the 17th century, Vendôme was part of the Maurist congregation. One of the most famous Maurists, Luc d'Achery, was professed in Vendôme.

The cloister buildings were substantially demolished by the military users at the onset of the twentieth century, but what remains houses a small museum devoted to the Vendômois. The monastery manuscripts are mainly conserved at the town library. The church until recently functioned for one midweek mass.

== Architecture ==
(NB., This is translated from de.wikipedia.org)

Although the abbey church in its present form is basically Flamboyant Gothic, it still contains elements of the simple first church in the transepts and the pillars of the crossing. The apse was rebuilt in High Gothic at the end of the 13th century (in the abbey's heyday); the two easternmost bays of the nave were built in the mid-14th century. After a long interruption caused by the Hundred Years' War, the work was resumed; the third and fourth bays of the nave were completed in 1492. The rest of the work was completed in the 16th century. The striking Flamboyant west façade was completed in 1507 probably by Jean de Beauce, the architect who designed the north spire of Chartres Cathedral. The openwork Flamboyant tracery effectively dissolves the central gable. All of the tympana also feature Flamboyant stained glass.

Several different architectural styles are represented in the nave due to the long construction period, as evidenced in the abutment and the change of the profile types and ornaments in the crossing.

In regard to special features, the four Romanesque crossing piers with traces of their original painted decoration can be observed. The sixteenth-century stained-glass windows are among the special features of the church building. The choir stalls, also from the 16th century, are decorated with grotesque animal figures and scenes of the incurred in running work.

The exterior contrasts the transitional late-Romanesque/early-Gothic bell tower from the 12th century to the flames of decorative tracery on the west façade. From the cloister of the 14th century the south wing remains. Part of the former monastery building is now a museum, in which are exhibited murals from the Loire Valley and regional religious art from the Middle Ages and the Renaissance.
