= Pierre Coral =

French monk and historian

Pierre Coral (died 1286) was a French monk and historian. He was the prior of Saint-Martin de Limoges, then abbot from 1247 until 28 August 1276, when he became the abbot of Tulle (as Pierre III), a position he held until his death. He was buried in Tulle next to the altar of Saint Martin.

Pierre wrote in Latin the first chronicle of the abbey of Saint-Martin de Limoges. He had access to a now lost cartulary, the Liber beate Marie, and also to charters of Bishop Hilduin, a passionary and a necrology. He acquired the Chronicle of Adhemar of Chabannes from neighbouring monasteries. Pierre's chronicle begins with the refoundation of the abbey by Hilduin in 1012, although it mentions events going back to its legendary founding by Saint Eligius in 648. It continues down to 1275.

The autograph manuscript of Pierre's chronicle is lost. It survives in four manuscripts, BnF lat. 5452 (fols. 104^{r}–112^{v}), 11019, 12764 (fols. 1–24) and 171116 (fols. 35–47). In the first three it is mixed with other historical material in what is known as the Great Chronicle of Limoges. MS 5452 contains some additions beyond 1275. A copy of the autograph made in 1275, now lost, was used by Claude Estiennot de la Serre and Jean Bandel in copying MSS 12764 and 171116, respectively, in the 17th century.

== Bibliography ==
- Becquet, Jean (1979). "Les premiers abbés de Saint-Martin de Limoges (XI^{e}–XII^{e} siècles)". Revue Mabillon. 59: 375–392.
- Becquet, Jean (1990). "Pierre Coral et la chronique de Saint-Martial de Limoges au XIII^{e} siècle". Bulletin de la Société archéologique et historique du Limousin. 118: 32–51.
- Guigniaut, J. D.; de Wailly, J. N., eds. (1855). "Majus Chronicon Lemovicense a Petro Coral et aliis conscriptum". Recueil des Historiens des Gaules et de la France. Vol. 21. Imprimerie royale. pp. 761–802.
- Lewis, Andrew W., ed. (2012). The Chronicle and Historical Notes of Bernard Itier. Clarendon Press.
- Molinier, Auguste (1902). "1459. Majus chronicon Lemovicense". Collections numériques de la Sorbonne. 2: 107.
- Rech, Régis (2006). "Le Limousin entre Capétiens et Plantagenêt chez les chroniqueurs de Saint-Martial au XIII^{e} siècle". In Claude Andrault-Schmitt (ed.). Saint-Martial de Limoges: ambition politique et production culturelle (X^{e}–XIII^{e} siècles). Presses Universitaires de Limoges. pp. 115–132.
- Rupin, Ernest (1904). Roc-Amadour: Étude historique et archéologique. Librairie G. Baranger Fils.
