= Ibn Wasil =

13th century Syrian scholar and diplomat

Ibn Wāṣil (AD 1208–1298 [AH 604–697]) was a Syrian judge, scholar and writer. He was a courtier and diplomat of the Ayyubids and their successors, the Mamlūks. Although trained as a religious scholar, in his own time he was renowned as a logician and today is most famous as a historian, especially of the Ayyubids. He also wrote works on poetry, medicine and astronomy.

== Life ==
Abū ʿAbd Allāh Jamāl al-Dīn Muḥammad ibn Sālim ibn Naṣr Allāh ibn Sālim ibn Wāṣil, commonly known simply as Ibn Wāṣil, was born in Ḥamā on 20 April 1208. His father was the qāḍī (judge) of Ḥamā and later al-Maʿarra, and worked as a mudarris (teacher) at the school known as the Nāṣiriyya by the Golden Gate in Jerusalem. He studied under his father. When the latter was away on the Ḥajj from 1227 to 1229, he took over some of his duties at the Nāṣiriyya. He witnessed the siege of Damascus in the spring of 1229. In 1230–1231, he studied in Damascus and Aleppo, where he was taught by Ibn Shaddād. His main education was a religious one. He studied fiqh (jurisprudence) and ḥadīth (tradition), and issued opinions as a muftī.

In 1232, Ibn Wāṣil joined the court of al-Nāṣir Dāʾūd, emir of Karak. There he studied under Shams al-Dīn al-Khusrūshāhī. In 1234, he joined the court of al-Muẓaffar II, emir of Ḥamā, who ordered him to help ʿAlam al-Dīn Qayṣar in constructing an astronomical observatory and an astrolabe. In 1236, he returned to Damascus, the ruled by the Emir Ḥusām al-Dīn ibn Abī ʿAlī, who became his patron.

In 1243–1244, Ibn Wāṣil travelled with his relative Ibn Abi ʾl-Dam first to Baghdad and thence to Cairo. In Egypt, he studied under the physician Ibn al-Nafīs. In 1252, he performed the Ḥajj in the company of Ḥusām al-Dīn ibn Abī ʿAlī. He returned to Cairo. In August 1261, he was sent by the Sultan Baybars on an embassy to King Manfred of Sicily. He met Manfred in Barletta. In 1264 or 1265, he moved back to Ḥamā, where he was appointed chief qāḍī. He spent most of his time writing. He was blind in old age, dying aged 93 years according to the Islamic calendar.

== Works ==
Pages from Ibn Wāṣil's commentary in verse on Ibn al-Ḥājib

Ibn Wāṣil wrote in Arabic. He wrote four works on logic, only two of which survive; four works of history; two works on poetry; and works on philosophical theology, astronomy and medicine, the last two being lost.

Ibn Wāṣil belonged to the "western" school of logic associated with Fakhr al-Dīn al-Rāzī. In his work against logic, Ibn Taymiyya referred to Ibn Wāṣil as a "leading philosopher". His works on logic include two commentaries on the work of the Egyptian logician al-Khūnajī. The commentary on al-Khūnajī's al-Jumal fiʾl-manṭiq ('The Sum of Logic') was his most popular logical work and survives in four manuscript, including three bearing the dates AH 680 (AD 1281), 738 (1337–1338) and 746 (1345). The other commentary on al-Khūnajī does not survive. Ibn Wāṣil also wrote a logical treatise, al-Risāla al-anbrūriyya ('The Imperial Treatise'), for King Manfred of Sicily. This survives in a single manuscript from 1281 under the title Nukhbat al-fikar fī tathqīf al-naẓar. Ibn Wāṣil later revised this treatise under the title Nukhbat al-fikar fiʾl-manṭiq ('The Pick of Reflection on Logic').

The first of Ibn Wāṣil's histories is Taʾrīkh al-Ṣāliḥī ('The Ṣāliḥī History'), a general history of Islam from the time of Muḥammad to the year AH 636/637 (AD 1239/1240). It was first dedicated to Sultan al-Ṣāliḥ Najm al-Dīn Ayyūb sometime between 1244 and 1249, and then re-dedicated to al-Muʿaẓẓam Tūrānshāh after the death of al-Ṣāliḥ in 1249. The second is Naẓm al-durar fi ʾl-ḥawādith wa ʾl-siyar, dedicated to Sultan Tūrānshāh (1249–1250). The third is Mufarrij al-kurūb fī akhbār Banī Ayyūb ('The Dissipater of Anxieties on the Reports of the Ayyubids'), a history of the Ayyubids down to 1263 and his most valuable work for later historians. It was written at Ḥamā between 1272 and 1285. Although ending in 1263, it contains a reference to the battle of Benevento in 1266. It survives in four incomplete manuscripts, but the complete text can be reconstructed from these.

Ibn Wāṣil wrote two works on poetry. The Tajrīd al-Aghānī (or Mukhtaṣar al-Aghānī) is a summary of the 10th-century Kitāb al-aghānī, a collection of poems performed at various courts. It was commissioned by the Emir al-Manṣūr II during Ibn Wāṣil's later period at Ḥamā. Three manuscript copies are known. He also wrote a commentary on a work on Arabic prosody by his teacher Ibn al-Ḥājib. Two copies are known, but the work spawned a series of commentaries in the following century.

Although he received a religious education, Ibn Wāṣil's interest lay in the rational sciences. His only work on religion falls in the realm of kalām (speculative theology). This was the Mukhtaṣar al-arbaʿīn fī uṣūl al-dīn ('The Summary of Forty Questions on the Bases of Religion'), a commentary on a work by al-Rāzī. It has not survived. Ibn Wāṣil's scientific works were no more popular. No copies of his two works on astronomy and medicine have survived. His work on astronomy, Nukhbat al-amlāk fī hayʾat al-aflāk, was dedicated to Tūrānshāh. His medical work was a summary of his teacher Ibn Bayṭār's al-Mufrada.

== Bibliography ==
- El-Shayyal, Gamal El-Din (1971). "Ibn Wāṣil". In Lewis, B.; Ménage, V. L.; Pellat, Ch. & Schacht, J. (eds.). The Encyclopaedia of Islam, Second Edition. Volume III: H–Iram. Leiden: E. J. Brill. p. 967. OCLC 495469525.
- Ibn Wāṣil al-Ḥamawī (2022). Khaled El-Rouayheb (ed.). Commentary on the Jumal on Logic. Brill.
- Hirschler, Konrad (2014). "Ibn Wāṣil: An Ayyūbid Perspective on Frankish Lordships and Crusades". In Alex Mallett (ed.). Medieval Muslim Historians and the Franks in the Levant. Brill. pp. 136–160. doi:10.1163/9789004280687.
- Humphreys, R. Stephen (1977). From Saladin to the Mongols: The Ayyubids of Damascus, 1193–1260. State University of New York Press.
- Waddy, Charis (1934). An Introduction to the Chronicle Called "Mufarrij al Kurūb fī Akhbār Banī Ayyūb" by Ibn Wāṣil (PDF) (PhD dissertation). SOAS, University of London.
