= Ibn Abi al-Dam =

13th-century Arab historian and Islamic Jurist

Shihāb al-Dīn Abū Isḥāq Ibrāhīm ibn ʿAbd Allāh ibn ʿAbd al-Munʿim ibn Abī al-Dam al-Ḥamawī (Note: Arabic: أبو إسحاق شهاب الدين إبراهيم بن عبد الله الحموي. For the full name, see Rosenthal 1968, p. 492, and Krauss-Sánchez 2016.) (29 July 1187 – 18 November 1244), known as Ibn Abī al-Dam, (Note: ابن أبي الدم, also romanized Ibn Abi ʾl-Dam or Ibn Abī al-Damm.) was an Arab historian and Shāfiʿī jurist.

== Life ==
Ibn Abī al-Dam was born in Ḥamāt under Ayyūbid rule on 29 July 1187. He studied in Baghdad, the capital of the ʿAbbāsid Caliphate; taught in the Ayyūbid cities of Ḥamāt, Aleppo and Cairo; and was in 1225 appointed qāḍī (chief judge) of Ḥamāt. In his own writings, he insists that he played no role in the coming to power of his patron, Emir al-Nāṣir Qilij Arslān, in 1221.

Ibn Abī al-Dam belonged to the Shāfiʿī school of jurisprudence (fiqh). Al-Muẓaffar II, who replaced al-Nāṣir as emir of Ḥamāt in 1229, sent him on a diplomatic mission to Baghdad in AH 641 (1243/1244). The following year, he was sent back to inform the Abbasid court of al-Muẓaffar's death. He fell ill with dysentery on the journey at al-Maʿarra and returned to Ḥamāt, where he died on the same day he entered the town, 18 November 1244.

== Works ==
Ibn Abī al-Dam wrote several works in Arabic. His only preserved historical work, al-Shamārīkh min al-Taʾrīkh, (Note: Richards 1993, p. 184, Kitāb al-Shamārīkh fī al-tawārīkh.) is a short annalistic history from the time of Muḥammad down to AH 628 (1230/31). It is found in at least two manuscripts: Oxford, Bodleian Library, ms. Marsh 60 (Uri 728) and Alexandria, Municipal Library, ms. 1292b. It is dedicated to al-Muẓaffar II. Ibn Abī al-Dam includes in it a copy of the diploma by which the Sultan al-Kāmil invested al-Muẓaffar with Ḥamāt. He defended the sultan's policy towards the Sixth Crusade, which resulted in the return of Jerusalem to crusader rule in 1229.

Ibn Abī al-Dam's other known work of history, a massive biographical dictionary in six volumes entitled al-Taʾrīkh al-Muẓaffarī, is lost. It is probably the "large history" (al-taʾrīkh al-kabīr) that he refers to in the Shamārīkh. It was written first and was dedicated to al-Muẓaffar at his accession in 1229. According to al-Sakhāwī's Iʿlān, it was arranged alphabetically beginning with "a biography of the Prophet, followed, successively, by the caliphs, philosophers-theologians, ḥadîṯ scholars, ascetics, grammarians, lexicographers, Qurʾân commentators, wazîrs, (army) leaders, and poets." Persons with the name Muḥammad were listed first and women last.

Besides his historical works, Ibn Abī al-Dam wrote commentaries on al-Ghazālī's Wasīṭ and Abū Isḥāq al-Shīrāzī's Tanbīh. His Tadqīq al-ʿināya fī taḥqīq al-riwāya is on the transmission of ḥadīth. He also wrote works on Islamic sects and the conduct of judges (adab al-qaḍāʾ). His legal opinions were discussed by Taqī al-Dīn and Tāj al-Dīn al-Subkī.

=== Excerpts ===
The following is the account in al-Shamārīkh of the siege of Damascus in 1229:

This year al-Malik al-Ašraf returned from Tall al-ʿAğūl and camped about Damascus at the beginning of Rabīʾ I, putting it under siege for [the months of] Rabīʾ and the two Ğumādā-s. The Sultan al-Malik al-Kāmil arrived and camped there, and there were many engagements, which are well-known, until the situation of the city's garrison became serious. There was nothing left for al-Malik al-Nāsir [Dāʾūd] but to throw himself on the mercy of the Sultan al-Malik al-Kãmil and to sue for his clemency. So he went out to meet him fearfully and fell to the ground before him and kissed his feet.

== Bibliography ==
- Al-Jomard, Jazeel Abdul Jabbar (1984). A Critical Edition of "al-Taʾrīkh al-Islāmī al-Mukhtaṣar" by Shihāb al-Dīn Abū Isḥāq Ibrāhīm ibn ʿAbdullāh ibn ʿAlī ibn Abī al-Dam al-Ḥamawī (583/1187–642/1244) (PhD diss.). University of St. Andrews.
- Krauss-Sánchez, Heidi R. (2016). "Ibn Abī al-Dam". In Graeme Dunphy; Cristian Bratu (eds.). Encyclopedia of the Medieval Chronicle. Brill Online. doi:10.1163/2213-2139_emc_SIM_01369.
- Massignon, Louis (1982). The Passion of Al-Hallaj, Mystic and Martyr of Islam, Volume 4: Biography and Index. Princeton: Princeton University Press. ISBN 978-0-691-65723-3.
- Richards, Donald S. (1993). "The Crusade of Frederick II and the Ḥamāh Succession: Extracts from the Chronicle of Ibn Abī al-Damm". Bulletin d'études orientales. 45: 183–200. JSTOR 41608365.
- Rosenthal, Franz (1968). A History of Muslim Historiography (2nd ed.). E. J. Brill.
- Rosenthal, Franz (1971). "Ibn Abi ʾl-Dam". In Lewis, B.; Ménage, V. L.; Pellat, Ch. & Schacht, J. (eds.). The Encyclopaedia of Islam, Second Edition. Volume III: H–Iram. Leiden: E. J. Brill. p. 683. OCLC 495469525.
- Tanzil-ur-Rahman (1966). "Adab al-Qādī". Islamic Studies. 5 (2): 199–207. JSTOR 20832838.
