= Nur al-Din Ali ibn Abd al-Rahim =

Syrian historian

Nūr al-Dīn ʿAlī ibn ʿAbd al-Raḥīm ibn Aḥmad al-Kātib al-Malakī al-Muẓaffarī Ibn al-Mughayzil (died 1302) was a Syrian historian of the Mamlūk period. His main work is Dhayl mufarrij al-kurūb fī akhbār banī Ayyūb.

ʿAlī was a native of Ḥamā. His maternal grandfather, Sharaf al-Dīn al-Anṣārī, who died in 1264, settled in the town and married his daughters into the prominent al-Mughayzil family. ʿAlī's date of birth is unknown, but he was already an adult early in the reign of Sultan Baybars I (1260–1277). He served as a secretary (kātib) under Sultan Qalāwūn (1279–1290) before becoming the principal secretary of Emir al-Muẓaffar III of Ḥamā in 1284. He may have been a student of the historian Ibn Wāṣil. He was the scribe to whom Ibn Wāṣil dictated his history, Mufarrij al-kurūb. He certainly took over Ibn Wāṣil's historical project, which the latter abandoned when he went on an embassy to Sicily in 1260–61, either with or without Ibn Wāṣil's blessing. There exist two extensions—continuations or supplements—of Ibn Wāṣil, one that is the work of ʿAlī ibn ʿAbd al-Raḥīm and another that may be as well. ʿAlī died in 701 AH (1302).

The Dhayl mufarrij al-kurūb covers the years 660–695 AH, corresponding to 1261/2–1295/6. The Dhayl is more limited in scope and less continuous than the Mufarrij. It is mostly about events in and around Ḥamā, although it contains some information on affairs elsewhere in the Mamlūk empire. The Dhayl describes the death of Al-Manṣūr II (1284) and how ʿAlī came to serve as al-Muẓaffar's principal secretary in considerable detail. It contains large chronological gaps between episodes, which are told in detail. ʿAlī frequently reports from memory or from what he had been told. He evidently had some direct dealings with the Franks, making him a useful source for the final period of the Crusades in Syria. He is also an eyewitness to the Mongol invasion of Syria, having accompanied Baybars on his anti-Mongol campaign of 1277. He was apparently also an eyewitness to the siege of al-Marqab (1285). Among other sources, he cites his relative Najm al-Dīn al-Ghaffār and the vizier of Ḥamā, Najm al-Dīn ibn al-Tāj.
