= Luc d'Achery =

French Benedictine monk and scholar

Luc d'Achery (1609 – 29 April 1685) was a learned French Benedictine of the Congregation of St. Maur, a specialist in the study and publication of medieval manuscripts.

== Life ==
D'Achery was born at Saint Quentin in Picardy. He entered the Order of St. Benedict at an early age and was professed at the Trinity Abbey, Vendôme, on 4 October 1632, but his health soon obliged him to remove to Paris. He became a member of the monastery of St. Germain des Prés in 1637, which in nearly fifty years he scarcely ever left, and he died there aged about 75.

As librarian of the monastery he was soon acquainted with its rich treasures of medieval history and theology. By a continuous correspondence with other monasteries, both in and out of France, he made himself a bibliographical authority of the first rank, especially in all that pertained to the unedited or forgotten writings of medieval scholars.

== Works ==
His first important work was an edition (Paris, 1645) of the Epistle of Barnabas, whose Greek text had been prepared for the press, before his death, by the Maurist Hugo Menardus. D'Achery's "Asceticorum vulgo spiritualium opusculorum Indiculus" (Paris, 1645) served as a guide to his colleague, Claude Chantelou, in the preparation of the five volumes of his "Bibliotheca Patrum ascetica" (Paris, 1661). In 1648 he published all the works of Blessed Lanfranc of Canterbury.

He published and edited for the first time the works of Abbot Guibert of Nogent (Paris, 1661) with an appendix of minor writings of an ecclesiastical character. In 1656 he edited the "Regula Solitaria" of the ninth century priest Grimlaicus (Grimlaic), a spiritual guide for hermits. His principal work, however, is the famous "Spicilegium, sive Collectio veterum aliquot scriptorum qui in Galliae bibliothecis, maxime Benedictinorum, latuerunt" (Paris, 1655–1677), continued by Baluze and Martène, who produced an enlarged and improved edition (Paris, 1723).

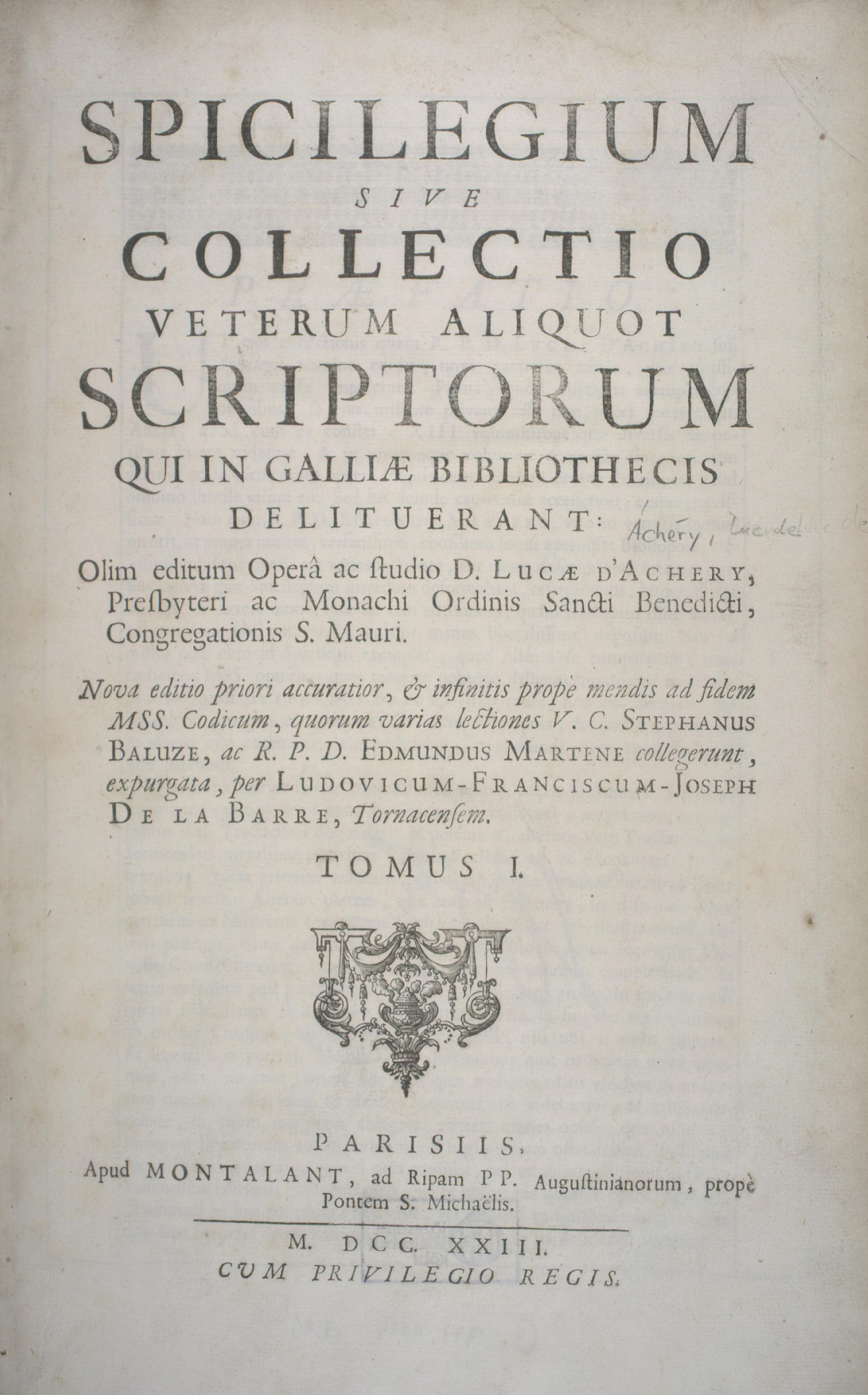
Spicilegium sive collectio veterum aliquot scriptorum (1723 edition), title page.

D'Achery collected the historical materials for the "Acta Ordinis S. Benedicti" but Mabillon added so much to it in the way of prefaces, notes, and "excursus" that it is justly accounted as his work.

D'Achery's correspondence is preserved in the Bibliothèque Nationale at Paris.
