= Laurent Bénard =

Laurent Bénard (1573–1620) was a French Benedictine monk and main founder of the Congregation of Saint-Maur.

Bénard was born in Nevers and joined the Cluniac Benedictines at Nevers, became a Doctor of the Sorbonne and later Prior of the Cluny College, Paris, which he reformed with the help of two monks of the recently established Congregation of St. Vanne.

Refusing the abbacy of St. Etienne, Caen, and the grand-priorship of Cluny, Bénard passed through a second novitiate at St. Vannes, and renewed his profession there in 1615. At his suggestion the Congregation of Saint Maur was formed, to be for France what that of St. Vannes was for Lorraine. Royal letters patent were obtained for it in 1618 and the project was warmly supported by Cardinal de Retz and others. Bénard's works include "Parénèses", "De l'esprit des ordres religieux", "Instructions Monastiques", "L'éloge Bénédictin", and "Police régulière", all published in Paris between 1616 and 1619.

Bénard died in Paris, 1620.
