= Sibt ibn al-Jawzi =

Islamic scholar (1185–1256)

- سبط ابن الجوزي

Personal life
- Born: 581 AH (1185/1186 CE)
- Died: 654 AH (1256/1257 CE)
- Era: Islamic golden age
- Region: Iraq and Syria
- Main interest(s): History and Fiqh
- Notable work(s): Mir’at al-zaman, The Defense and Advocacy of the True School of Law, Tazkirat ul-Khawas

Religious life
- Religion: Islam
- Jurisprudence: Hanafi

Muslim leader
- Influenced by: Abu-al-Faraj ibn Al-Jawzi

Shams al-Din Abu al-Muzaffar Yusuf ibn Kizoghlu (c. 581AH/1185–654AH/1256), popularly known as Sibṭ ibn al-Jawzī (Arabic: سبط ابن الجوزي) was a writer, preacher and historian.

== Biography ==
Born in Baghdad, the son of a Turkish freedman and Ibn al-Jawzi's daughter, Sibt ibn al-Jawzi was raised by his grandfather. After his grandfather's death he moved to Damascus, where he worked under the Ayyubids Sultans al-Mu'azzam, an-Nasir Dawud, and al-Ashraf. In 1229, on an-Nasir's command, he gave a fiery sermon in the Umayyad Mosque denouncing the treaty of Jaffa with the Crusaders as Damascus prepared for the coming siege at the hands of al-Ashraf.

He is the grandson of the Hanbali scholar Abul-Faraj Ibn Al-Jawzi. His title "Sibt ibn al-Jawzi" denotes that he was the sibṭ (grandson) of Ibn al-Jawzi from his daughter's side.

Unlike his Hanbali grandfather, he was of the Hanafi madhhab, which was the judicial school common to those of Turkish descent and preferred by the Ayyubid Sultans. He has also been described as having Shia tendencies, most notably by al-Dhahabi. His historical writings, which include more critical accounts of Uthman compared to other sources, and Ibn Kathir's obituary of him have been given as evidence supporting this.

== Works ==
- Mir’at al-Zamān fī Tawarīkh al-'Ayān (مرآة الزمان في تواريخ الأعيان) 'Mirror of time in histories of the notables'; 23-volume encyclopedic biographical History. www.archive.org (Beirut, 2013, in Arabic.)
- The Defense and Advocacy of the True School of Law (Arabic: al-Intisar wa al-Tarjih li al-Madhhab al-Sahih) - in praise of Abu Hanifa and his school.
- Tazkirat ul-Khawasتذکرۃ الخواص-Introduced eminence of the heirs of Muhammad The Prophet of Islam

For more information on him and his works see:

- Abjad Al-Ulum - Siddiq Hasan Al Qunuji
- Kashf al-Zunun
- Mu'jam al-matbu'at
