= Dom Jacques Alexandre =

Dom Jacques Alexandre (24 January 1653 at Orléans, France – 23 June 1734 at Bonne-Nouvelle) was a learned Benedictine monk of the Congregation of St. Maur. He made his profession in the abbey of Vendôme on 26 August 1673, and after completing his philosophical and theological studies, was sent to the monastery of Bonne-Nouvelle, where he spent the remainder of his life.

== Biography ==
Alexandre died as sub-prior of the monastery. Though somewhat delicate in health, he was a man of great industry and all his leisure was devoted to the study of mathematics and physical and mechanical science. He wrote much, though apparently without thought of publication, for most of his writings were merely transcribed into a large folio volume which was preserved in the library of Bonne-Nouvelle.

Alexandre is known chiefly by two works, Traité du flux et du reflux de la mer and the Traité général des horloges. The former had already been written when the Academy of Bordeaux proposed the cause of the tides as the subject of a prize essay. Alexandre submitted an extract which was deemed worthy of the prize and his success led him to publish the entire work at Paris, 1726. This treatise, based as it is upon the supposed rotation of the earth about the moon, is of interest only from an historical point of view, as a contribution to the solution of a problem which has engaged the attention of the most skilful analysts since the time of Newton. The Traité général des horloges, Paris, 1734, as its name indicates, is a general treatise on the history and the art of constructing time-pieces. It contains a catalogue of writers on the subject with a brief account of their principal works. Besides his manuscript works on subjects in mathematics, mechanics, etc., Alexandre added a sixth part to Huygens' treatise "De horologio oscillatorio", in which he describes a clock the length of whose pendulum was automatically varied to enable it to indicate apparent solar instead of mean solar time. A description of the pendulum mechanism, which never came into practical use, may be found in Berthoud's "Essai sur l'horlogerie", Paris, 1786, I, xvii, where some of its defects are pointed out.
