= Monasticon Gallicanum =

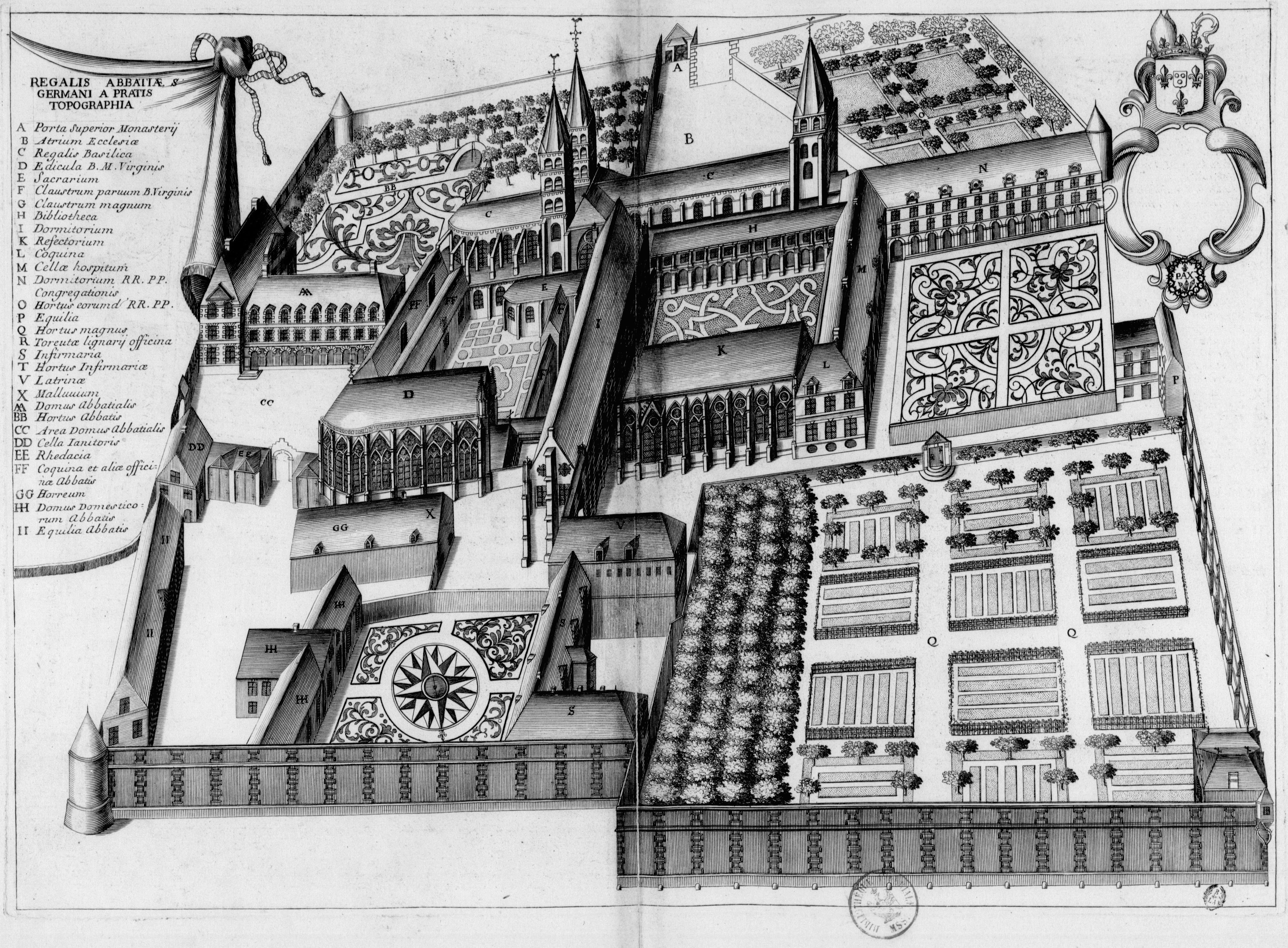
Late 17th-century engraving of the Abbey of Saint-Germain-des-Prés, a typical plate from the Monasticon Gallicanum

The Monasticon Gallicanum is a collection of 168 engravings of topographical views, with two maps, representing 147 French monasteries belonging to the reformist Benedictine Congregation of St. Maur. Commissioned by Dom Michel Germain, the engravings were prepared between 1675 and 1694, but not published in full until 1870.

== Creation 1675–1694 ==
The members of the Congregation of St. Maur had a strong interest in monastic history and produced many notable historiographical works on individual religious houses There was a need however for a work covering all the monasteries of the Congregation.

Dom Michel Germain, a monk at the Abbey of Saint-Germain-des-Prés and a friend of Jean Mabillon, undertook the task. From 1675 he wrote individual historical texts about, and commissioned the accompanying plates of, all the Maurist monasteries, but although by the time of his death in 1694 the plates had been engraved and most of the texts written, the work did not proceed to publication.

The texts remained in manuscript, in the form of booklets and loose leaves. Over time they became disordered and some were lost; those surviving eventually found their way to the Bibliothèque nationale de France.

As for the engravings, which Dom Germain commissioned from several different unknown engravers, a small number of prints were made at the time, which circulated loose, and the copper plates were then dispersed without trace. A very few sets were assembled and bound by different individuals from 1694 through the 18th century; these however included various additional prints foreign to the set.

== Publication 1870–1871 ==
Achille Peigné-Delacourt, an antiquary and collector of mediaeval documents, realised the importance of Germain's illustrations, since so many of the original buildings had been lost in the interval. In 1860 he published reproductions of the engravings relating to the monasteries in the province of Reims, with the promise to publish the complete set of the engravings after taking care to remove the other illustrations that had been added to them by the various amateur collectors who had preserved them. The task of verifying which engravings were genuinely among those commissioned by Germain was undertaken by Louis Courajod, archivist and palaeographer attached to the Department of Prints and Photographs of the Bibliothèque Nationale (then the Bibliothèque Impériale) for the complete edition of the illustrations of the Monasticon Gallicanum published in 1870–71, which successfully reproduced the prints at half-size without losing sharpness of detail.

A couple of facsimile editions were published in the later 20th century.
