= Jehan de Beauce =

French architect

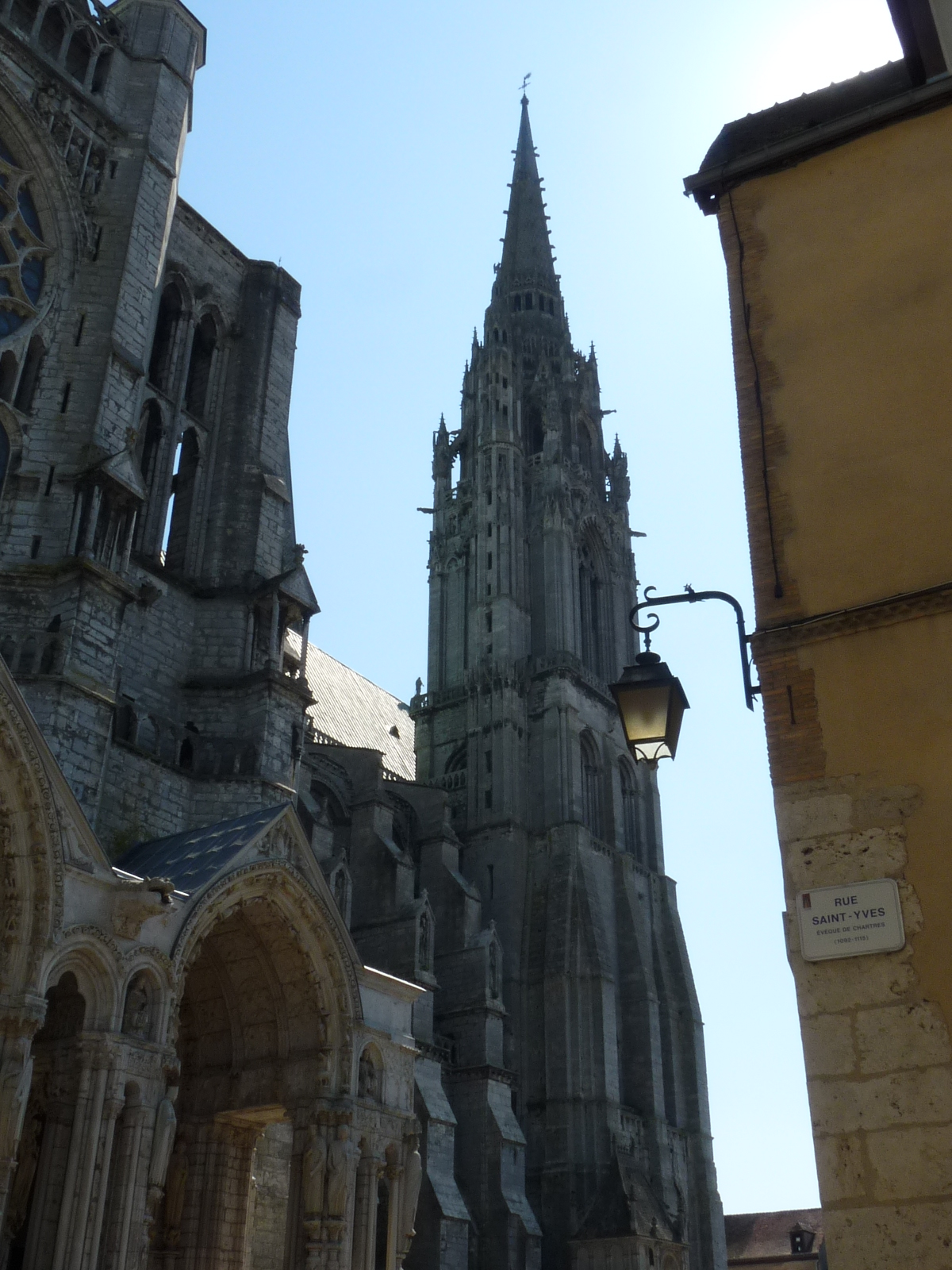
Northern spire of the Chartres Cathedral, in the flamboyant Gothic style. Rebuilt by Jehan de Beauce from 1507 to 1513 (height 115 m).

Jehan (Jean) Texier or Le Texier (before 1474 – 29 December 1529 in Chartres), better known as Jehan (Jean) de Beauce was a 15th/16th-century French architect. He is known for his works of religious architecture, notably on the Chartres Cathedral of which he reconstructed the northern spire.

== Biography ==
Jehan possibly traces his family roots back to the small town of La Ferté-Bernard where several members of the Le Texier family are documented, including a homonymous stone mason who is probably Jehan de Beauce's cousin . The name Jehan Texier appears in the town ledgers of Le Mans in 1474 where he possibly worked as a stonemason at the castle.

Until 1506 he resided at Vendôme where he participated in the building of the Trinity Abbey.

In 1506, he was commissioned to rebuild the northern bell tower of the Chartres Cathedral destroyed by lightning on 26 July 1506.

In Chartres, Jehan de Beauce also built:

- The renovation of the Église Saint-Aignan de Chartres between 1513 and 1525.
- The construction of the pavillon of the Horloge astronomique de Chartres in 1520.
- The construction of the arch extending the collégiale Saint-André de Chartres above the Eure river.

== Bibliography ==
- Couturier, Marcel (1994). "Un Maître d'œuvre au XVIe siècle: Jehan de Beauce". Mémoires de la Société archéologique d'Eure-et-Loir. pp. 225–239. (available at Gallica)
- Isabelle Isnard, Être architecte à la fin du Moyen Âge: la carrière protéiforme de Jean de Beauce, "maître maçon de l'oeuvre de l'église de Chartres", in: Revue de l'Art, n°151/2006-l, p. 9-23
