= Claude Estiennot de la Serre =

French Benedictine scholar

Claude Estiennot de la Serre (or de la Serrée) (17 February 1639 – 20 June 1699) was a French Benedictine scholar of the Congregation of Saint-Maur.

== Life ==
He was born at Toutry. He joined the Benedictines at Vendôme and was professed there in 1658. After teaching humanities for a short time to the junior monks at Pontlevoy, he was, at the instance of Luc d'Achery, sent to the Abbey of St-Germain-des-Prés, Paris.

There he met Jean Mabillon, whose intimate friend and fellow-worker he became. Together they journeyed on foot through Flanders, visiting all its chief monastic libraries. In 1670 he was made sub-prior of St-Martin's, Pontoise.

In 1684 he was appointed procurator for his congregation in the Curia Romana, which post required his residence in Rome for the remainder of his life. During the fifteen years he lived in Italy he saw to many matters of ecclesiastical business. He enjoyed the confidence of several popes and other high officials of the Catholic Church.

He died at Rome in 1699, and was buried in the church of the Minims of SS. Trinità de' Monti.

== Works ==
A history of St-Martin's, Pontoise, in three volumes, was his first published work. Between 1673 and 1682 he compiled his chief work, entitled "Antiquités Bénédictines", in which the monastic traditions of France are treated under the headings of the different dioceses. Besides, he collected sixteen volumes of "Fragments historiques".

On his way to Rome he visited monasteries and collected literary material, which he sent back to Mabillon, and most of which found its way into the "Annales O.S.B." or the Gallia Christiana. Though he did not publish much under his own name, he continued to research in the chief libraries of Italy, all of which were open to him, and to forward the results.
