= Abu Shama =

Damascene historian

Abū Shāma Shihāb al-Dīn al-Maḳdisī (Note: Full name: Abū Shāma Shihāb al-Dīn Abuʾl-Ḳāsim ʿAbd al-Raḥmān ibn Ismāʿīl ibn Ibrāhīm ibn ʿUthmān ibn Abī Bakr ibn Ibrāhīm ibn Muḥammad al-Maḳdisī (or al-Maqdisī).) (10 January 1203 – 13 June 1267) (Note: Ahmad 1960 gives the Hijrī dates 23 Rabīʿ II 599 – 19 Ramaḍān 665, but gives the Gregorian year of his death as 1268.) was an Arab historian.

Abū Shāma was born in Damascus, where he passed his whole life save for one year in Egypt, a fortnight in Jerusalem and two pilgrimages to the Ḥijāz. He was an eyewitness to and provides the most precise information about the siege of Damascus in May–June 1229. He received a diverse Sunnī education and wrote on a variety of topics. In 1263, he became a professor in the Damascene madrasas of al-Rukniyya and al-Ashrafiyya. He died five years later in Damascus.

Five works by Abū Shāma survive. All the rest have been lost, some in a fire that destroyed his library. He is best known today for his three historical writings, especially his two volumes on Syria in the Zengid and Ayyubid periods:

- Kitāb al-rawḍatayn fī akhbār al-dawlatayn al-Nūriyya wa-l-Ṣalāḥiyya (The Book of the Two Gardens, Concerning Affairs of the Reigns of Nūr al-Dīn and Ṣalāḥ al-Dīn), a chronological account of the reigns of Nūr al-Dīn (1146–1174) and Ṣalāḥ al-Dīn (1174–1193). He is careful to cite his sources. His main ones are al-Barḳ al-Shāmī of ʿImād al-Dīn al-Iṣfahānī, Sīrat Ṣalāḥ al-Dīn of Ibn Abī Ṭayy and the epistles (Rasāʾil) of al-Ḳāḍī al-Fāḍil. He usually quotes his sources verbatim, with the exception of ʿImād al-Dīn.
- al-Dhayl ʿalaʾl-rawḍatayn (Sequel to the Two Gardens), a continuation of the previous work down to contemporary events. His main source in the first part is the Mirʾāt al-Zamān of Sibṭ ibn al-Jawzī and in the second part himself as eyewitness.
- Taʾrīkh Dimashḳ (History of Damascus), a summary of the eponymous work of Ibn ʿAsākir (died 1175). It survives in two versions.

Abū Shāma's works are important sources for the history of the Crusades. There are partial translations in French (Note: In Recueil des Historiens des Croisades, Historiens Orientaux 4 (Paris, 1898).) and German. Abū Shāma also wrote commentaries on:

- the Ḳaṣīda al-Shāṭibiyya of al-Shāṭibī (died 1194)
- seven poems on Muḥammad by his teacher ʿAlam al-Dīn al-Sakhāwī (died 1245)
