= Charis Waddy =

Australian-born British Islamic scholar and author

- Born: 24 September 1909; Parramatta, New South Wales, Australia
- Died: 29 August 2004 (aged 94); Oxford, Oxfordshire, England
- Citizenship: Australia/United Kingdom
- Education: Lady Margaret Hall, Oxford; SOAS University of London
- Occupations: Author; Islamic scholar
- Awards: Sitara-i-Imtiaz

Charis Waddy (24 September 1909 – 29 August 2004) was an Australian-born British author, lecturer and Islamic scholar. She worked full-time with the Oxford Group from 1935 after which it became Moral Re-Armament (MRA; now Initiatives of Change). Waddy wrote her first book, Baalbek Caravans, in 1967 on her experiences of staying long-term in Lebanon. She wrote The Muslim Mind in 1976 and authored Women in Muslim History four years later. Waddy received the Pakistani Sitara-i-Imtiaz (Star of Distinction) in 1990 and was highly regarded worldwide by Muslims.

== Early life and education ==
On 24 September 1909, Waddy was born in Parramatta, New South Wales, Australia. She was the daughter of the clergyman Percival Stacy, who was headmaster of The King's School, Parramatta, and the journalist Etheldred Stacy (née Spittal). Waddy had four other siblings. In 1919, following the conclusion of the First World War, she relocated from Sydney to join her father in Jerusalem, and enrolled at Jerusalem Girls' College. She matriculated to Lady Margaret Hall, Oxford, graduating in 1931 with a Bachelor of Arts first degree in Oriental Languages (Arabic and Hebrew). Waddy thus became the first woman to graduate from an Oxford college with an Oriental Languages degree. She then earned her Doctor of Philosophy degree studying the 13th-century historian Ibn Wasil at the SOAS University of London in 1934 and was the first woman to obtain this feat.

== Career ==
Waddy joined the Oxford Group as a full-time worker in 1935, before it became Moral Re-Armament (MRA; now Initiatives of Change), which supported construction faith communities worldwide. For the next half a century, she helped to host the MRA's international conference centre in Caux, Switzerland, as well as doing work to reconcile Europe post-war. Waddy spent three years in West Africa in the mid-1950s with the writers of the 1957 feature film Freedom. She went back to the Middle East in the 1960s and wrote her first book, Baalbek Caravans, in 1967 about her experiences of a long-term stay in Lebanon.

Waddy published, The Muslim Mind, after her heavy travelling of the Middle East in 1976 and would be published in three editions. Her objective was to explore the approach of Muslims to contemporary and practical issues such as family life, forgiveness, the meaning of Jihad, the Quran, war and women's rights and featured quotes from several friends of hers and high-figure officials in the Middle East. The book received critical acclaim for "a work that had the power of alleviating misunderstanding and prejudice among those of differing faiths."

She lectured as a visiting professor on Mediterranean History at Cairo University in 1977. Three years later, Waddy authored Women in Muslim History. She chronicled the lives of Muslim women across history whose achievements are not known to an average Western citizen and used English secondary sources. Three weeks following Indira Gandhi's assassination in 1984, Waddy was invited to lecture at the Bengali poet Rabindranath Tagore's Shantiniketan ashram in Calcutta and went on to give a talk at the Islamic medical institute Hamdard Pakistan. She received the Sitara-i-Imtiaz (Star of Distinction) in 1990, one of the most decorated awards in Pakistan, "for her contribution to the understanding of Pakistan, and particularly its women, in the West."

During the 1990s, Waddy assisted in the hosting of the invitation of Prince Hassan bin Talal becoming the first non-Christian to preach at Christ Church, Oxford. She helped with the re-development of the Oxford Centre for Islamic Studies. Waddy was a member of the British Society for Middle Eastern Studies, the Committee for British-Arab University Visits and the Council for Arab-British Understanding. She contributed to several Middle East studies journals and the Times Educational Supplement.

== Personal life ==
Waddy was a Christian. She died in Oxford on 29 August 2004. Waddy did not marry.

== Legacy ==
She was regarded highly worldwide by Muslims. Waddy became trusted with academic and religious leaders in several of the Middle Eastern countries she visited and it "was with a deepened faith and a skilled discernment of the human heart." Khan wrote of Waddy: "Her work helps to break down stereotypes, replaces many inaccurate images and gives an understanding of Muslims in all aspects of their lives." Khan added: "She had a special quality of listening and appreciating the best in others... To Charis Waddy, the study of the Muslim world called 'for an attitude in the non-Muslim which it must be acknowledged has often been lacking: a respect for a way of life which has already lasted for 14 hundred years, which has nurtured more than one great civilization, and which is at present in a state of upheaval and expansion."
