= Siege of Safed (1188) =

1188 siege by Saladin against Jerusalem

- Part of the Crusades
Date	November–December 1188
Location	Safed
Result	Ayyubid victory

Belligerents
Ayyubid Sultanate	Knights Templar; Knights Hospitaller

Commanders and leaders
Saladin; Saphadin	

The siege of Safed (November–December 1188) was part of Saladin's invasion of the Kingdom of Jerusalem.

The siege of the Templar-held citadel of Safed (also spelt Saphet) began in early November 1188. Saladin was joined by his brother, Saphadin. Saladin employed a large number of trebuchets and extensive mines. He also maintained a very tight blockade. According to Bahāʾ al-Dīn, the conditions were rainy and muddy. At one point, Saladin specified the placement of five trebuchets, mandating that they be assembled and in place by the morning.

A letter written while the siege was ongoing by the Hospitaller provisor Hermengar to Duke Leopold V of Austria records the Hospitaller's "fear for the Templars' castle of Safad [since] we do not know how long they can endure continual sieges and life-threatening hardships." A relief force of Hospitallers was intercepted and routed. In an incident recorded by Ibn al-Athīr, two Hospitallers were captured and sentenced to be executed by Saladin. One of them expressed shock at the sentence in terms flattering to the sultan, who then spared their lives and imprisoned them instead.

The failure of the relief force had consequences. It was the exhaustion of their supplies and not the attacks on the walls that induced the Templar garrison to sue for peace on 30 November. On 6 December, the garrison walked out on terms. They went to Tyre, which Saladin had failed to capture in an earlier siege.

Other historians who mention the siege include Abū Shāma and ʿImād al-Dīn.

== Bibliography ==
- Barber, Malcolm; Bate, Keith, eds. (2013). Letters from the East: Crusaders, Pilgrims and Settlers in the 12th–13th Centuries. Ashgate.
- Ellenblum, Ronnie (2007). Crusader Castles and Modern Histories. Cambridge University Press.
- Fulton, Michael S. (2018). Artillery in the Era of the Crusades: Siege Warfare and the Development of Trebuchet Technology. Brill.
- Kennedy, Hugh (1994). Crusader Castles. Cambridge University Press.
- Phillips, Jonathan (2019). The Life and Legend of the Sultan Saladin. Yale University Press.
