= Robert Guérard =

French monk and scholar

Robert Guérard (1641 – 2 January 1715) was a French Benedictine scholar of the Congregation of St. Maur.

== Life ==
Guérard was born at Rouen. For some time, he collaborated at Saint-Denys in the Maurist edition of the works of Augustine of Hippo. In 1675, however, he had to leave Saint-Denys by order of Louis XIV, who wrongly suspected him of having had a hand in the publication of L'Abbé commendataire, a work which severely criticized the practice of holding and bestowing abbeys, etc., in commendam.

His superior sent him to the monastery of Notre Dame at Ambronay, in the Diocese of Belley. While in exile, he discovered at the Carthusian monastery of Portes a manuscript of Augustine's Opus imperfectum against Julian of Eclanum, which was afterwards used in the Maurist edition of Augustine's works.

After a year of exile, he was recalled, and spent the rest of his life successively at Fécamp Abbey and at the monastery of Saint-Ouen, where he died.

== Works ==
He is the author of a biblical work entitled "L'Abrégé de la sainte Bible en forme de questions et de réponses familières", which he published at Rouen in 1707 (later edition, Paris, 1745).
