= Nicolas-Hugues Ménard =

French scholar

Nicolas-Hugues Ménard (Hugo Menardus) (1585 in Paris – 21 January 1644) was a French Benedictine scholar.

His father was private secretary to Catherine de' Medici, his mother was a native of Blois. After a liberal education Ménard entered the Order of St. Benedict, 3 February 1607, at St. Denis, and made his religious profession 10 September 1612.

In the next year, he joined the reform movement of St. Vannes in Verdun which some years later developed into the Congregation of St. Maur; and he became one of its main helps. After some time he was called to Paris, where he soon became a favourite preacher and frequently occupied the principal pulpits. For sixteen years he taught rhetoric at the College of Cluny. By word and deed he sought to induce his fellow religious to unite an exemplary life with love for study especially of Church history and patrology.

On account of failing health he was placed by his superiors in the abbey of St. Germain des Prés, where he lived in great seclusion. In his small circle of intimate friends the Jesuit Sirmond stood foremost.

== Works ==
- Martyrologium Sanctorum ordinis St. Benedicti, to which he added several biographies and explanatory notes which greatly enhance the value of the work (Paris, 1629)
- Concordia regularum, auctore St. Benedicto Anianae abbate, from a manuscript found in the Abbey of Fleury, which is supplemented by a life of St. Benedict of Aniane (Paris, 1638)
- St. Gregorii I Papae Liber Sacramentorum, from a manuscript Missal of St. Eligius (Paris, 1642). This also appears in the edition of the works of St. Gregory of the year 1705. The commentary on the book is highly praised by Muratori (Dissert. de rebus liturgicis, ch. 6), who states that Tomasi and Mabillon would have preferred the text of Pamelius but the Maurists, when publishing the notes of Ménard had also to use his text
- De unico Dionysio Areopagita Athenarum et Parisiorum episcopo, a defence of the identity of the Areopagite and first Bishop of Paris, written (at first anonymously) against Jean Launoy, in defence of Millet (Paris, 1643)
- S. Barnabae Apostoli (ut fertur) Epistola Catholica, ab antiquis olim ecclesiae patribus sub ejusdem nomine laudata et usurpata (Paris, 1640). The Greek text had been found by Sirmond at Rome, and Ménard discovered a Latin translation at the Abbey of Corbie.
