= Toutry =

- Commune
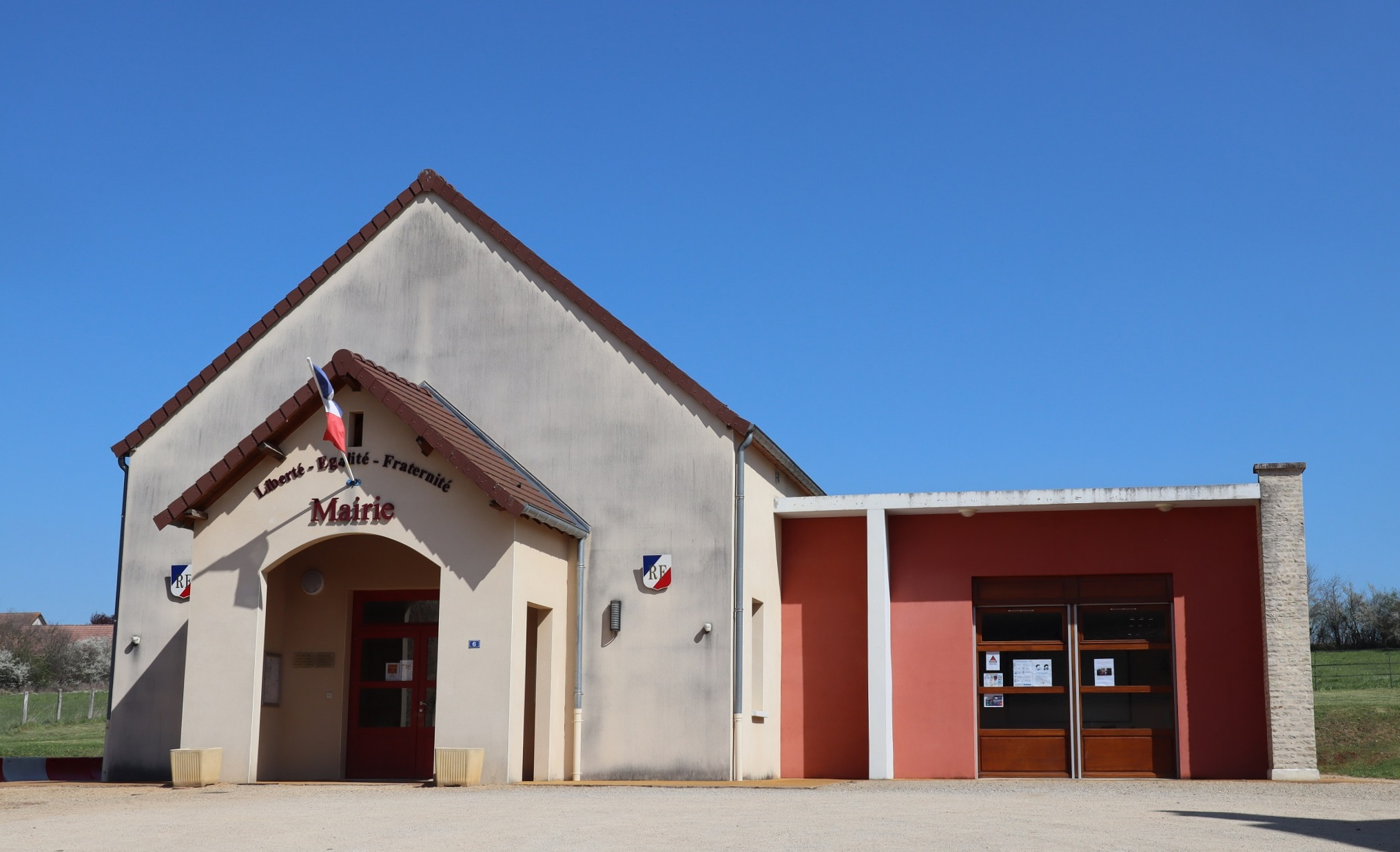
- Town hall

- Coat of arms
- Location of Toutry
- Location within France Location within Bourgogne-Franche-Comté
- Coordinates: 47°30′06″N 4°07′21″E
- Country: France
- Region: Bourgogne-Franche-Comté
- Department: Côte-d'Or
- Arrondissement: Montbard
- Canton: Semur-en-Auxois

Government
  - Mayor (2020–2026): Bernard Clerc
- Area^{1}: 6.42 km^{2} (2.48 sq mi)
- Elevation: 230 m (750 ft)
- Highest elevation: 278 m (912 ft)
- Lowest elevation: 215 m (705 ft)
- Population (2023): 402
  - Density: 62.6/km^{2} (162/sq mi)
- Time zone: UTC+01:00 (CET)
  - Summer (DST): UTC+02:00 (CEST)
- INSEE/Postal code: 21642 /21460
- ^{1} French Land Register data, which excludes lakes, ponds, glaciers > 1 km^{2} (0.386 sq mi or 247 acres) and river estuaries.

Toutry (French pronunciation: [tutʁi]) is a commune in the Côte-d'Or department in eastern France.

== Population ==
Historical population
| Year | Pop. | ±% p.a. |
|---|---|---|
| 1968 | 687 | — |
| 1975 | 724 | +0.75% |
| 1982 | 503 | −5.07% |
| 1990 | 496 | −0.18% |
| 1999 | 452 | −1.03% |
| 2007 | 482 | +0.81% |
| 2012 | 456 | −1.10% |
| 2017 | 442 | −0.62% |
| 2023 | 402 | −1.57% |
Source: INSEE

== See also ==
- Communes of the Côte-d'Or department
