= De constructione castri Saphet =

13th-century literature

De constructione castri Saphet ("On the Construction of the Castle of Ṣafad") is a short anonymous Latin account of the re-building of the fortress of Ṣafad by the Knights Templar between 1241 and 1244. There is no other account of its kind from the Crusader Levant and its historical value is considerable.

The text was written by someone in the following of Benedict of Alignan and possibly connected to the Templars. He may have been an eyewitness, but more likely he based his account on eyewitness reports. Although in all likelihood from Western Europe, he probably wrote in Acre. He wrote after Benedict's arrival in the Levant in 1260 and before the castle fell to the Muslims in 1266.

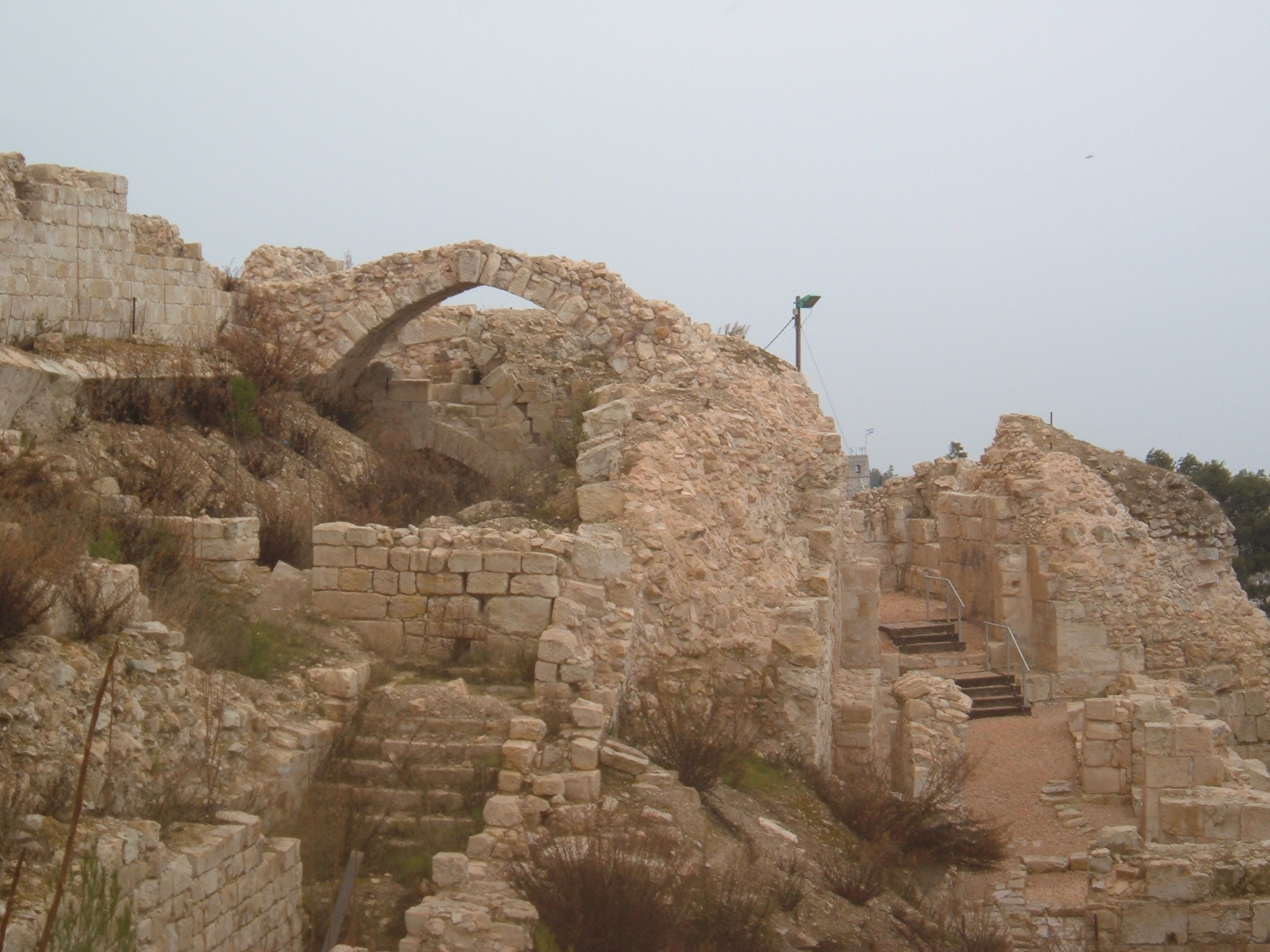
Ruins of the castle of Ṣafad today

There are two copies of the De constructione. One is found in a 14th-century manuscript kept in Paris and the other in an undated manuscript in Turin. Both manuscripts also contain the Historia Occidentalis of Jacques de Vitry. The Paris copy was published in 1713 and the Turin in 1749, but the first critical edition based on both only appeared in 1965. There have been two English translations based on this edition.

Ṣafad had been captured by the Ayyubids in December 1188. It was returned to Christian and Templar control in the summer of 1240 in accordance with a truce between the Barons' Crusade and Emir Ismāʿīl of Damascus. The text of De constructione presents the impetus for re-building the castle as coming from Benedict of Alignan, who visited the Holy Land for the first time in 1239–40. It stresses the cost of the re-building and upkeep, the strategic significance of the castle at the time of writing and the protection it provided to the Holy Places. It may have been served as a fundraising pamphlet for the use of preachers.

After a short introduction setting out the purpose of the work, it is divided into eight sections:

1. Why, when and how the building of the castle at Saphet was begun
2. How the bishop of Marseilles persuaded the Master of the Temple and his council to build the castle of Saphet
3. The joy at the building of the castle at Saphe
4. How a well of fresh water was found within the castle of Saphet
5. The wonderful construction of the castle of Saphet
6. The massive daily expenses for guarding the castle of Saphet
7. The excellence of the castle of Saphet
8. The usefulness of the castle and the surrounding places which are attached to it

== Bibliography ==
=== Editions and translations ===
- Barber, Malcolm; Bate, Keith, eds. (2002). "Rebuilding of the Castle of Safad (1241–44)". The Templars: Selected Sources. Manchester University Press. pp. 84–93.
- Huygens, R. B. C., ed. (1965). "Un Nouveau Texte du traite 'De constructione castri Saphet'". Studi medievali. 3rd ser. 6 (1): 355–387.
- Huygens, R. B. C., ed. (1981). De constructione castri Saphet: Construction et fonction d'un chateau fort franc en Terre Sainte. North-Holland.
- Kennedy, Hugh (1994). "Appendix: De constructione castri Saphet (translation)". Crusader Castles. Cambridge University Press. pp. 190–198.

=== Secondary literature ===
- Pringle, Denys (1985). "Review Article: Reconstructing the Castle of Safad". Palestine Exploration Quarterly. 117 (2): 139–149. doi:10.1179/peq.1985.117.2.139.
- Rubin, Jonathan (2018). Learning in a Crusader City: Intellectual Activity and Intercultural Exchanges in Acre, 1191–1291. Cambridge University Press.
