= Léger Marie Deschamps =

French philosopher

Léger Marie Deschamps (10 January 1716 – 19 April 1774), Benedictine monk, known under his Benedictine name of Dom Deschamps, was a French philosopher and utopian socialist, who taught a form of modified Spinozism.

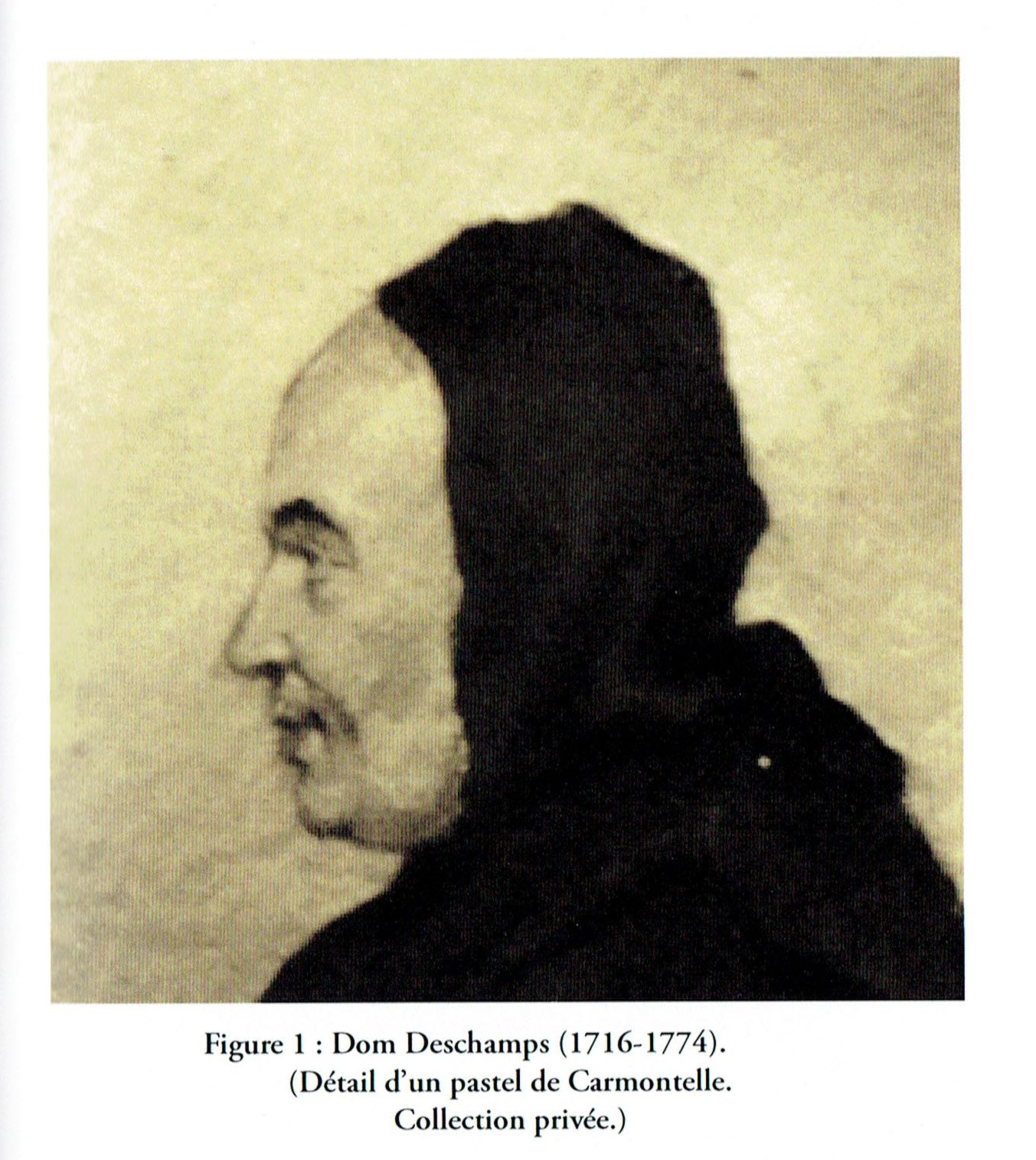
Léger-Marie Deschamps

== Metaphysics ==
During his lifetime he published very little, but corresponded with most of the leaders of the French Enlightenment. Rediscovered in 1862, he was hailed as a precursor of Hegel. His metaphysical system anticipates Hegel by asserting that truth includes contradictory elements, and he had much to say about how the concept Being collapses into that of Nothing. There was a further revival of interest in his work after 1974, and his collected works were finally published in 1993.

== Major work ==
Le Vrai Système ou le Mot de l'énigme métaphysique et morale, facsimile published by the Société des textes français modernes, by Jean Thomas and Franco Venturi, Paris, 1939
