= Abbey of Saint-Martin de Limoges =

Benedictine monastery in Limoges, France

Coordinates: 45.8312°N 1.2602°E

Saint-Martin de Limoges (or Saint-Martin-lez-Limoges) was a Benedictine monastery in Limoges from 1012 and a house of Feuillants from 1624 until 1791.

Drawing of a Limoges enamel cross of Saint-Martin, said to have belonged to Saint Eligius

== Older monastery in the same location ==
For the early years of the monastery before its re-foundation, there is no other source than the 13th-century chronicle of the Abbot Pierre Coral. He records that a monastery dedicated to Martin of Tours was founded around 640 by the parents of Saint Eligius, and that the latter's brother, Alicius, was the first abbot. It was subsequently destroyed by Pippin I of Aquitaine during the a civil war and then again by Vikings. How much of this history is true is impossible to say, but there was certainly an abandoned church outside the walls by the year 1000.

== History ==
Bishop Hilduin of Limoges established a Benedictine monastery at that place in 1012. This is mentioned by a contemporary, Ademar of Chabannes. Hilduin and his brother, the abbot of Saint-Martial, gave gifts to the monastery. The bishop endowed it with the relics of Saint Justus. He may even have procured royal and papal protection for his new foundation. He was buried at Saint-Martin. Pierre Coral claims that he still left the monastery poor and small. Soon after, Bishop Jordan praised the monastery before the peace council of 1031.

The first abbot, Rudolf, came from the abbey of Tulle. The second, Berengar, came from Saint-Augustin-lès-Limoges and died en route. The third, Donadieu, was consecrated in December 1074. Tradition associated him with the monastery's acquisition of a relic of Martin of Tours. The fourth abbot, Jordan, came from Vierzon. He resigned and was succeeded by Gerard. Gerard, a monk of Tulle, was succeeded in 1134 by the first abbot elected from among the monks of Saint-Martin, William I.

In 1155, William was succeeded by Pierre de Pierrebuffière, a native of the Limousin and the prior of Sauxillanges. During his abbacy, in 1182, the monastery was heavily damaged when Henry the Young King suppressed a local rebellion. The monks were given refuge in the city by Saint-Martial. Pierre soon left for Cluny and by 1195 the monks had elected William II. William died the following year and Richard the Lionheart imposed the provost of Saint-Augustin, Raymond de Treignac, as abbot. Although Richard favoured rebuilding the monastery, nothing was done in Raymond's term of four or five years as the abbot. The church was rebuilt by 1235. In 1247, Pierre Coral became abbot. He left to become abbot of Tulle in 1276.

During the Wars of Religion, the monastery was damaged by Huguenots in 1548 and 1563. It was repaired by the commendatory abbot Marchandon. In 1622, the Benedictines of Saint-Martin ceded their house to Marchandon, who converted it into a house of Feuillants by 1624 under the name Saint-Martin-Saint-Laurent. In 1791, the building was acquired by the government. It became the headquarters of the 12th Army Corps. Today no trace of the monastic building remains.

== Bibliography ==
- Besse, J.-M. (1912). Abbayes et prieurés de l'ancienne France. Vol. 5. Paris.
- Becquet, Jean (1979). "Les premiers abbés de Saint-Martin de Limoges (XI^{e}–XII^{e} siècles)". Revue Mabillon. 59: 375–392.
- Bonnaud, Louis (2001). "Les reliques de l'ancienne abbaye Saint-Martin-lez-Limoges". Bulletin de la Société Archéologique et Historique du Limousin. 129: 159–177.
- Guibert, Louis (1898). "Les sépultures de l'abbaye de Saint-Martin-lès-Limoges et la crosse de l'archevêque Geoffroi". Bulletin de la Société Archéologique et Historique du Limousin. 46: 242–253.
- Lecler, André (1890). Chroniques ecclésiastique du Limousin. Tulle.
- Jones, Anna T. (2009). Noble Lord, Good Shepherd: Episcopal Power and Piety in Aquitaine, 877–1050. Leiden: Brill.
