= Benedict of Alignan =

French Benedictine abbot

The Blessed Benedict of Alignan (died 1268) was Benedictine abbot of Nôtre Dame de la Grasse (1224) and Bishop of Marseille (1229).

== Biography ==
Benedict twice visited Palestine (1239–1242 and 1260–1262), where he helped the Knights Templar build the great castle of Safed.

Benedict founded a short-lived order, the Brothers of the Virgin, which was suppressed by the Council of Lyon (1274), and died a Franciscan. His writings include a letter to Pope Innocent IV and De Summa Trinitate et Fide Catholica in Decretalibus (circa 1260). Someone in his following wrote De constructione castri Saphet.

== Bibliography ==
- Baluze, Étienne. "ii". Miscellanea.
- Jonathan Rubin, "Benoit d’Alignan and Thomas Agni: Two Western Intellectuals and the Study of Oriental Christianity in 13th-century Kingdom of Jerusalem," Viator 44.1 (Spring, 2013), pp. 189–199.

Attribution:
