= Congregation of Saint Maur =

Benedictine congregation

The Congregation of St. Maur, often known as the Maurists, were a congregation of French Benedictines, established in 1621, and known for their high level of scholarship. The congregation and its members were named after Saint Maurus (died 565), a disciple of Saint Benedict credited with introducing the Benedictine rule and life into Gaul. The congregation was suppressed and its superior-general executed during the French Revolution.

== History ==
At the end of the 16th century the Benedictine monasteries of France had fallen into a state of disorganization and laxity. In the Abbey of St. Vanne near Verdun a reform was initiated by Dom Didier de la Cour, which spread to other houses in Lorraine, and in 1604 the reformed Congregation of St. Vanne was established, the most distinguished members of which were Ceillier and Calmet. A number of French houses joined the new congregation; but as Lorraine was still independent of the French crown, it was considered desirable to form on the same lines a separate congregation for France. At the suggestion of Laurent Bénard in 1621 thus was established the famous French Congregation of St. Maur.

Most of the Benedictine monasteries of France, except those belonging to Cluny, gradually joined the new congregation, which eventually embraced nearly two hundred houses. The chief house was Saint-Germain-des-Prés, Paris, the residence of the superior-general and center of the literary activity of the congregation.

The primary idea of the movement was not the undertaking of literary and historical work, but the return to a strict monastic régime and the faithful carrying out of Benedictine life; and throughout the most glorious period of Maurist history the literary work was not allowed to interfere with the due performance of the choral office and the other duties of the monastic life. Towards the end of the 18th century a tendency crept in, in some quarters, to relax the monastic observances in favor of study; but the constitutions of 1770 show that a strict monastic régime was maintained until the end.

The course of Maurist history and work was checkered by the ecclesiastical controversies that distracted the French Church during the 17th and 18th centuries. Some of the members identified themselves with the Jansenist cause; but the bulk, including nearly all the greatest names, pursued a middle path, opposing the lax moral theology condemned in 1679 by Pope Innocent XI, and adhering to those strong views on grace and predestination associated with the Augustinian and Thomist schools of Roman Catholic theology; and like all the theological faculties and schools on French soil, they were bound to teach the four Gallican articles.

Towards the end of the 18th century a rationalistic and freethinking spirit seems to have invaded some of the houses. The congregation (along with all Catholic religious orders) was suppressed in 1790 during the French Revolution, and the monks were scattered. The last superior general of the order (Ambroise Chevreux) and forty monks died on the scaffold in Paris in 1792, during the September Massacres. (Note: The former French Congregation of Benedictines, now the Solesmes Congregation, initiated by Dom Prosper Guéranger in 1833, was a new creation and has no continuity with the Congregation of St. Maur.)

== Works ==
Their historical and critical school produced a number of works of scholarship which still are of permanent value. The foundations of this school were laid by Dom Tarisse, the first superior-general, who in 1632 issued instructions to the superiors of the monasteries to train the young monks in the habits of research and of organized work. The pioneers in production were Ménard and Luc d'Achery.

The full Maurist bibliography contains the names of some 220 writers and more than 700 works. The lesser works in large measure cover the same fields as those in the list, but the number of works of purely religious character, of piety, devotion and edification, is very striking. What was produced was only a portion of what was contemplated and prepared for.

Some of their most important contributions are:

- a revision of Gallia Christiana,
- L'art de vérifier les dates,
- l'Histoire littéraire de la France.

The French Revolution cut short many undertakings, the collected materials for which fill hundreds of manuscript volumes in the Bibliothèque nationale de Paris and other libraries of France. There are at Paris 31 volumes of Berthereau's materials for the Historians of the Crusades, not one in Latin and Greek, but in the oriental tongues; from them have been taken in great measure the Recueil des historiens des croisade whereof 15 folio volumes have been published by the Académie des Inscriptions. There exist also the preparations for an edition of Rufinus and one of Eusebius, and for the continuation of the Papal Letters and of the Concilia Galliae. Dom Cafflaux and Dom Villevielle left 236 volumes of materials for a Trésor généalogique. There are Benedictine Antiquities (37 vols.) (Claude Estiennot de la Serre), a Monasticon Gallicanum and a Monasticon Benedictinum (54 vols.) Of the Histories of the Provinces of France barely half a dozen were printed, but all were in hand, and the collections for the others fill 800 volumes of manuscripts. The materials for a geography of Gaul and France in 50 volumes perished in a fire during the Revolution.

The output was prodigious, coming from a single society. The qualities that have made Maurist work proverbial for learning are its critical tact and its thoroughness.

== Prominent Maurists ==
- Dom Jacques Alexandre (1653–1734)
- Luc d'Achery (1609–1685)
- Dom Bédos de Celles (1709–1779)
- Ambroise Chevreux (1728–1792)
- Charles Clémencet (1703–1778)
- Pierre Coustant (1654–1721)
- Maurus Dantine (1688–1746)
- Léger Marie Deschamps (1716–1774)
- Ursin Durand (1682–1771)
- Michel Félibien (1665–1719)
- Jacques Du Frische (1640–1693)
- Robert Guérard (1641–1715)
- Guy Alexis Lobineau (1666–1727)
- Jean Mabillon (1632–1707)
- Edmond Martène (1654–1739)
- Nicolas-Hugues Ménard (1585–1644)
- Bernard de Montfaucon (1655–1741)
- Antoine-Joseph Pernety (1716–1796)
- Thierry Ruinart (1657–1709)
- Claude Estiennot de la Serre (1639–1699)
- René-Prosper Tassin (1697–1777)
- Charles-François Toustain (1700–1754)
- Joseph Vaissète (1685–1756)
