= Al-Mu'azzam Isa =

Ayyubid emir of Damascus from 1218 to 1227

Al-Muʿaẓẓam ʿĪsā
- Emir of Damascus
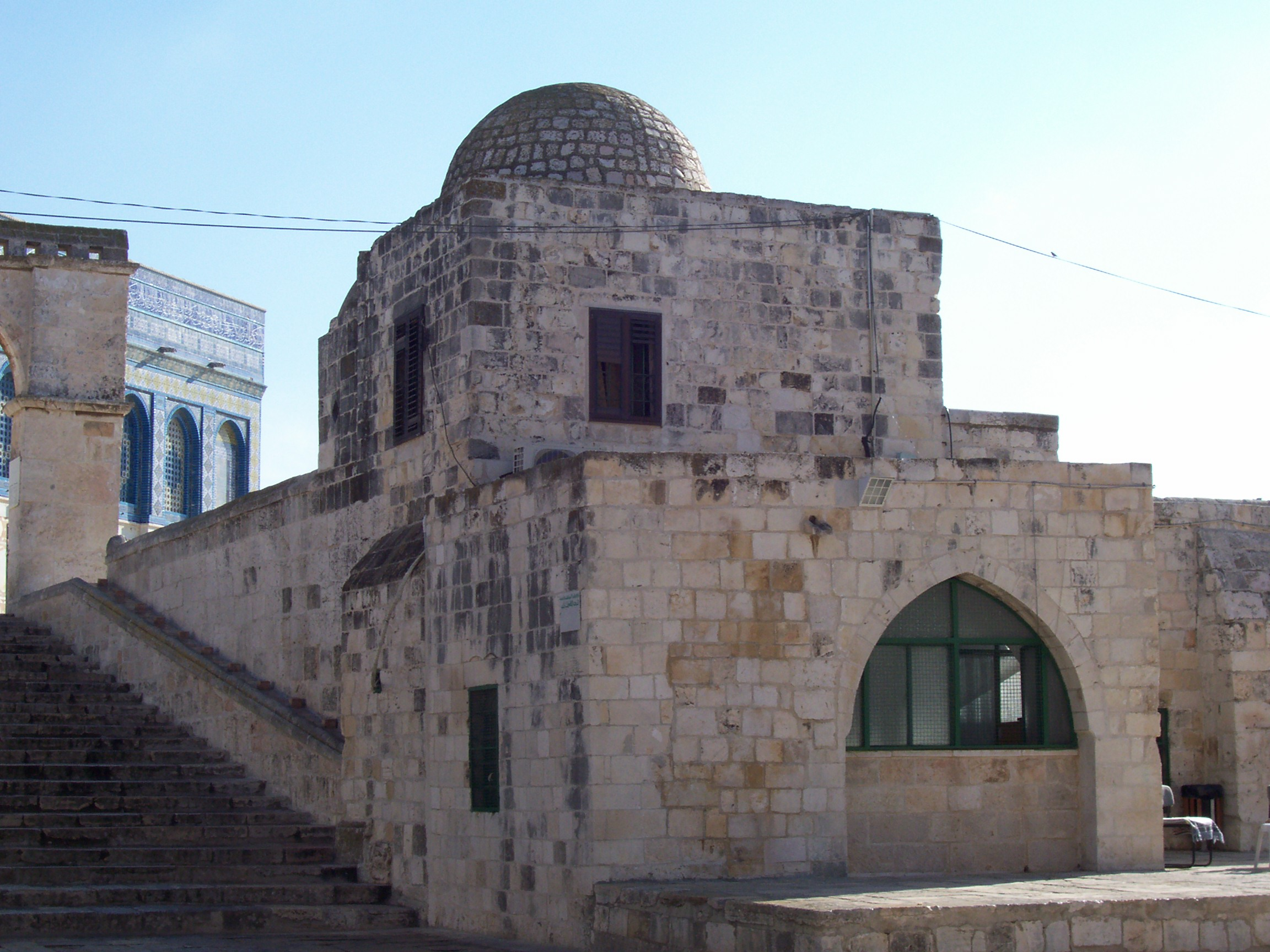
- The superstructure of the Al-Malik al-Muazzam Isa cistern, adjacent to the Dome of the Rock, Jerusalem
- Reign: 1218–1227
- Predecessor: Al-Adil I
- Successor: An-Nasir Dawud
- Born: 1176; Cairo
- Died: 12 November 1227 (aged 50–51); Damascus
- Dynasty: Ayyubid
- Religion: Sunni Islam

Sharaf ad-Dīn al-Muʿaẓẓam ʿĪsā (al-Malik al-Muʿaẓẓam ʿĪsā; 1176 – 1227) was the Emir of Damascus from 1218 to 1227. He was the son of Sultan al-Adil I and nephew of Saladin, founder of the Kurdish Ayyubid dynasty.

== Life ==
Al-Mu'azzam was installed by his father as governor of Damascus in 1198 or 1200. In 1217-1218 al-Mu'azzam was supporting his father in operations against the Crusaders of the Fifth Crusade. He occupied Nablus to screen Jerusalem from attack, then was instructed to destroy the fortifications of Mt.Tabor in order to free up its garrison for use elsewhere. He gained success in a minor battle near Ramla, but immediately afterwards returned to Damascus on receiving news of his father's death. He resumed the rule of Syria, though loyally acknowledging the suzerainty of his brother, Al-Kamil, the new sultan. After his father's death in 1218, al-Mu'azzam ruled the Ayyubid lands in Syria in his own name, down to his own death in 1227.

Al Mu'azzam moved his army to Egypt to reinforce the Sultan in his defence of Egypt against the Crusader operations against Damietta, February 1219. In 1220, al-Mu'azzam returned to Syria where he captured and destroyed Caesarea. Once again in Egypt with his troops, he was on hand for the surrender of Damietta by the Crusaders, in September 1221. With the Crusader threat lifted, the endemic strife between the leading members of the Ayyubid dynasty resurfaced. He laid siege to Hama, in January 1223, and took Maarat al-Numan and Salamya. Forced to desist and return his conquests by the sultan, al-Mu'azzam reacted by allying himself with Gökböri, the ruler of Erbil. His rebellion was largely aimed at al Ashraf, who governed the Jazira. In order to free himself from the restraint imposed by al-Kamil, he used his influence over the army in Egypt to paralyse the Sultan's ability to interfere militarily. In 1226 al-Mu'azzam attacked Homs, while Gökböri assaulted Mosul. The military pressure induced al Ashraf to make his submission to al Mu'azzam. However, in May 1227, al Ashraf succeeded in escaping from his captivity in Damascus. With all the Ayyubid princes now aligned against him and menaced by Emperor Frederick II's Crusaders, al Mu'azzam destroyed the fortifications of Jerusalem. On 12 November 1227, before any conflict with Frederick, he died, lamented by his soldiers and the citizens of Damascus. He was succeeded by his son, an-Nasir Dawud.

He was respected as a man of letters, and was interested in grammar and jurisprudence. By 1204, Jerusalem was his primary residence.

== Legacy ==
He ordered and contributed to the construction and restoration of many buildings inside the Ḥaram ash-Sharīf (the Noble Sanctuary), Jerusalem:

- Extending the Dome of the Rock terrace by 18 meters westward. (Note: p. 164: "extension of the whole west side of the Dome of the Rock terrace a full 18 m to the west, with the addition of some water tanks […] By extending the upper terrace, al-Muʿazzam created a prestigious site for a new building known as the "Grammar School" (al-Madrasa al-Nahwiyya).")
- Two water-distribution structures: as a donor, not as a patron (one who ordered them built):
  - 1210 or 1211: the Cistern of al-Muʿaẓẓam ʿĪsā, a water tank.
  - 1216 or 1217: the Shaʿlān Sebil, a sebil (fountain).
- 1217 or 1218: restoring the arched portico of al-Aqsa Mosque's façade, adding a pendentive dome over the main entrance.
- The Market of Knowledge (Sūq al-Maʿrifa): a Hanbalite prayer place in the southeast corner of the compound; demolished in the 19th century.
- 1213-14: ten cross-vaulted bays on piers in the central section of the compound's north portico (of the compound's northern wall).
- 1211-12: renovating the southeastern colonnade. (Note: p. 170: "the arcade [7] at the top of the eastern flight of steps on the south side of the Dome of the Rock terrace". But [7] (on p. 154) is mislabelled as "Southwest Arcade".)
- New door leaves for the Superintendant's Gate and Remission Gate.

He founded these madrasas:

- 1207: an-Naḥawiyya Madrasa (Grammarians' Madrasa), which is on the extended terrace he made.
- 1209–1218: al-Muʿaẓẓamīya Madrasa (al-Hanafiyya Madrasa), Jerusalem: specialized in Hanafi jurisprudence (now al-Mujāhidīn Mosque).
- 1214: an-Nāṣiriyya (an-Nāṣriyya): on top of the Golden Gate; named after his uncle, Saladin (al-Malik an-Nāṣir). It no longer exists.
- al-Muʿaẓẓamīya Madrasa, aṣ-Ṣāliḥiyyah, Damascus: also his family mausoleum.

Furthermore, he modified the walls of Jerusalem and Damascus:

- 1202, 1203, 1212 and 1213-14: repairing Jerusalem's walls' fortifications.
- 1219: dismantling Jerusalem's walls to preemptively reduce Jerusalem's military strength in case of it falling into the hands of the Crusaders.
- 1226: rebuilding Damascus's city wall, likely also refortifying it with a tower at the southeastern corner.

== Bibliography ==
- Gibb, H.A.R. (1962) "The Aiyubids", in History of the Crusades, Volume 2: The Later Crusades, 1189-1311, Wolff, R.L. and Hazzard, H.W. (eds.), Ch. XX, pp. 693–714, University of Pennsylvania Press, Philadelphia PA.

Regnal titles
Preceded by Al-Adil I	Emir of Damascus; 1218–1227	Succeeded by An-Nasir Dawud
