= An-Nasir Dawud =

Ayyubid emir of Damascus from 1227 to 1229

- Emir of Damascus
- An-Nasir (right) making a truce with Peter of Brittany, from Matthew Paris's chronicle
- Reign: 1227–1229
- Predecessor: Al-Mu'azzam Isa
- Successor: Al-Ashraf Musa
- Born: 1206
- Died: 1261 (aged 54–55)
- Dynasty: Ayyubid
- Religion: Sunni Islam

An-Nasir Dawud (1206–1261) was a Kurdish ruler of the Ayyubid sultan of Damascus from 1227 to 1229 and later emir of Al-Karak from 1229 to 1248.

== Life ==
An-Nasir Dawud was the son of Al-Mu'azzam, the Ayyubid Emir of Damascus from 1218 to 1227. On his father's death, An-Nasir succeeded, but soon faced opposition from his uncle, Al-Kamil of Egypt, who made war on him, conquering Jerusalem and Nablus. An-Nasir appealed for help to his other uncle, Al-Ashraf, ruler of Harran. Al-Ashraf, however, betrayed his nephew, coming to an agreement with Al-Kamil to divide An-Nasir's lands between them - Al-Ashraf would take Damascus and the north, while Al-Kamil took control of Palestine.

An-Nasir, however, realizing the deception in time, retreated to his capital of Damascus, where he was besieged by the combined armies of his uncles late in 1228. The siege of Damascus continued until 25 June 1229, when it surrendered to Al-Ashraf, who became its ruler, acknowledging the overlordship of his older brother. An-Nasir was compensated with the lordship of Kerak in the Transjordan region.

An-Nasir Dawud was to rule from Kerak for the next thirty years. In 1239 he returned briefly to prominence when his cousin As-Salih Ayyub, eldest son of Al-Kamil, just expelled from Damascus by rebellion, fell into his hands. An-Nasir held him prisoner, refusing to give him up to Al-Adil II, Ayyub's brother and the ruler of Egypt.

In November 1239, Peter I of Brittany (a leader of the Barons' Crusade) attacked a caravan moving up the Jordan to Damascus. An-Nasir was incensed, and marched on Jerusalem, which was almost undefended. He occupied the city, and the garrison of the citadel surrendered on 7 December. An-Nasir did not attempt to hold Jerusalem, however, but merely destroyed the fortifications and withdrew to Kerak.

In April 1240, An-Nasir, quarreling with Al-Adil, released Ayyub and allied with him against the Egyptians, in return for a promise that Ayyub would reinstall him in Damascus. Al-Adil was imprisoned by his own troops, and Ayyub and An-Nasir entered Cairo in triumph in June. When An-Nasir returned to Kerak the next month, however, he found himself under attack from the crusaders, who had entered into alliance with his enemy, as-Salih Ismail of Damascus. Meanwhile, Ayyub renounced his promises to restore An-Nasir in Damascus, leaving An-Nasir diplomatically isolated. In order to hold on to his lands, An-Nasir was forced to come to an agreement with Ismail, and then with the Crusaders.

In the Spring of 1241, Ayyub, having signed a truce with the Crusaders, launched a campaign to reconquer Syria. His army met the troops of An-Nasir in battle west of Jerusalem, and were defeated. Now, however, An-Nasir changed sides again, submitting to Ayyub. For the next two years, An-Nasir was faced with constant fighting against the Franks, and occasionally with Ismail as well, and received little in the way of concrete aid from Ayyub, so he changed sides once again, going over to his uncle Ismail's side in 1243. The arrival of a force of Khwarizmian freebooters from the north led to the abandonment of an attempted joint Crusader-Damascene invasion of Egypt, and An-Nasir again withdrew to Kerak.

When Ayyub sent an army to recover Damascus and Palestine in 1245, An-Nasir was deprived of his lands west of the Jordan, but was allowed to retire back to his original lands beyond the Jordan. He continued to rule Kerak until 1248, when he was finally deposed. He died some years later, in 1256.

== Sources ==
- Gibb, H. A. R. (1969). The Aiyūbids (PDF). A History of the Crusades (Setton), Volume II.
- Runciman, Steven (1954). A History of the Crusades, Volume Three: The Kingdom of Acre and the Later Crusades. Cambridge University Press. ISBN 978-0521347723.

Regnal titles
Preceded by Al-Mu'azzam	Emir of Damascus; 1227–1229	Succeeded by Al-Ashraf
Preceded by New Office	Emir of Kerak; 1229–1249	Succeeded by Badr al-Din Sawabi
