= History of libraries =

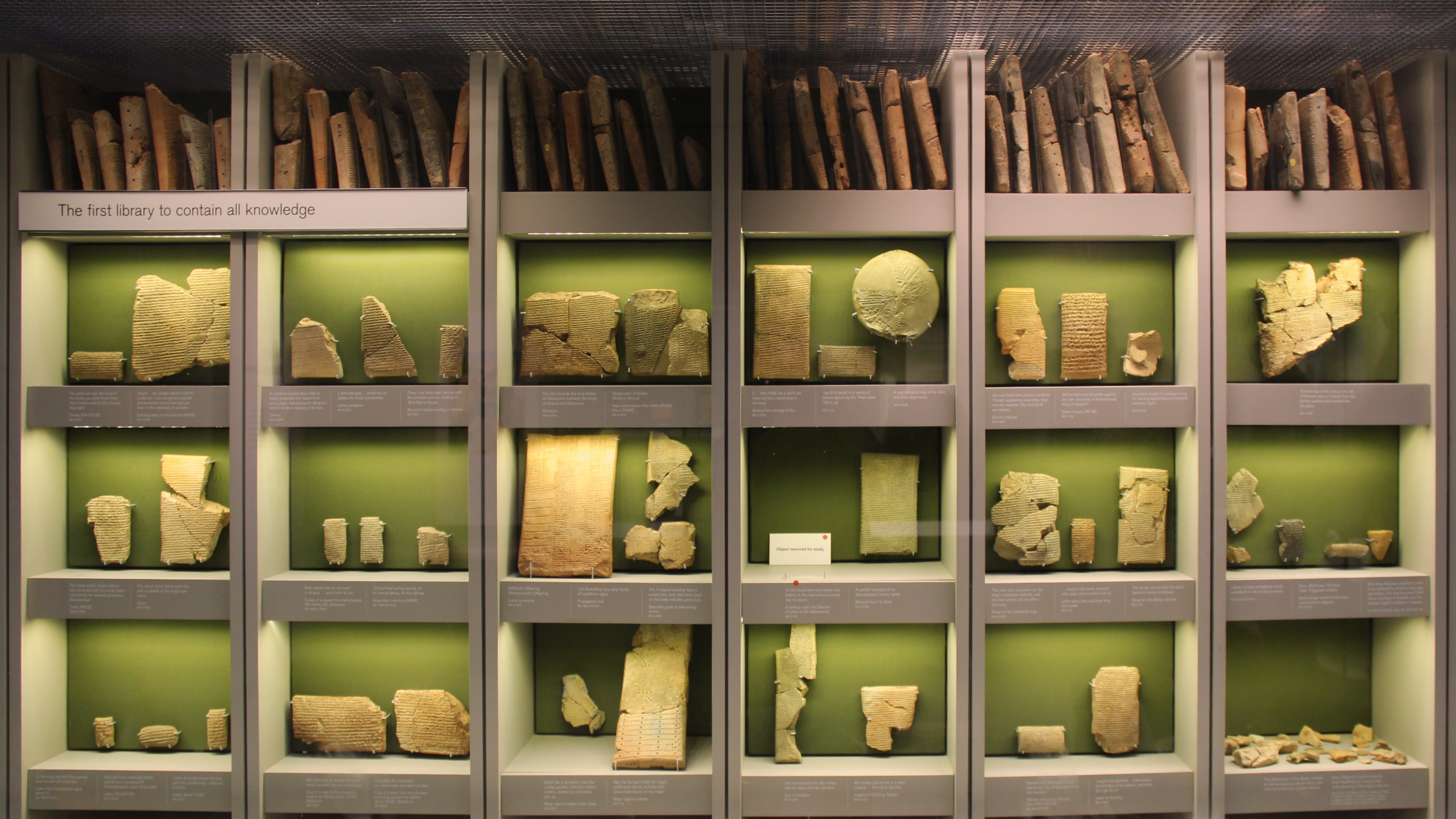
The 7th century BC Library of Ashurbanipal

The history of libraries began with the first efforts to organize collections of documents. Topics of interest include accessibility of the collection, acquisition of materials, arrangement and finding tools, the book trade, the influence of the physical properties of the different writing materials, language distribution, role in education, rates of literacy, budgets, staffing, libraries for targeted audiences, architectural merit, patterns of usage, and the role of libraries in a nation's cultural heritage, and the role of government, church or private sponsorship. Computerization and digitization arose from the 1960s, and changed many aspects of libraries.

== Early libraries ==
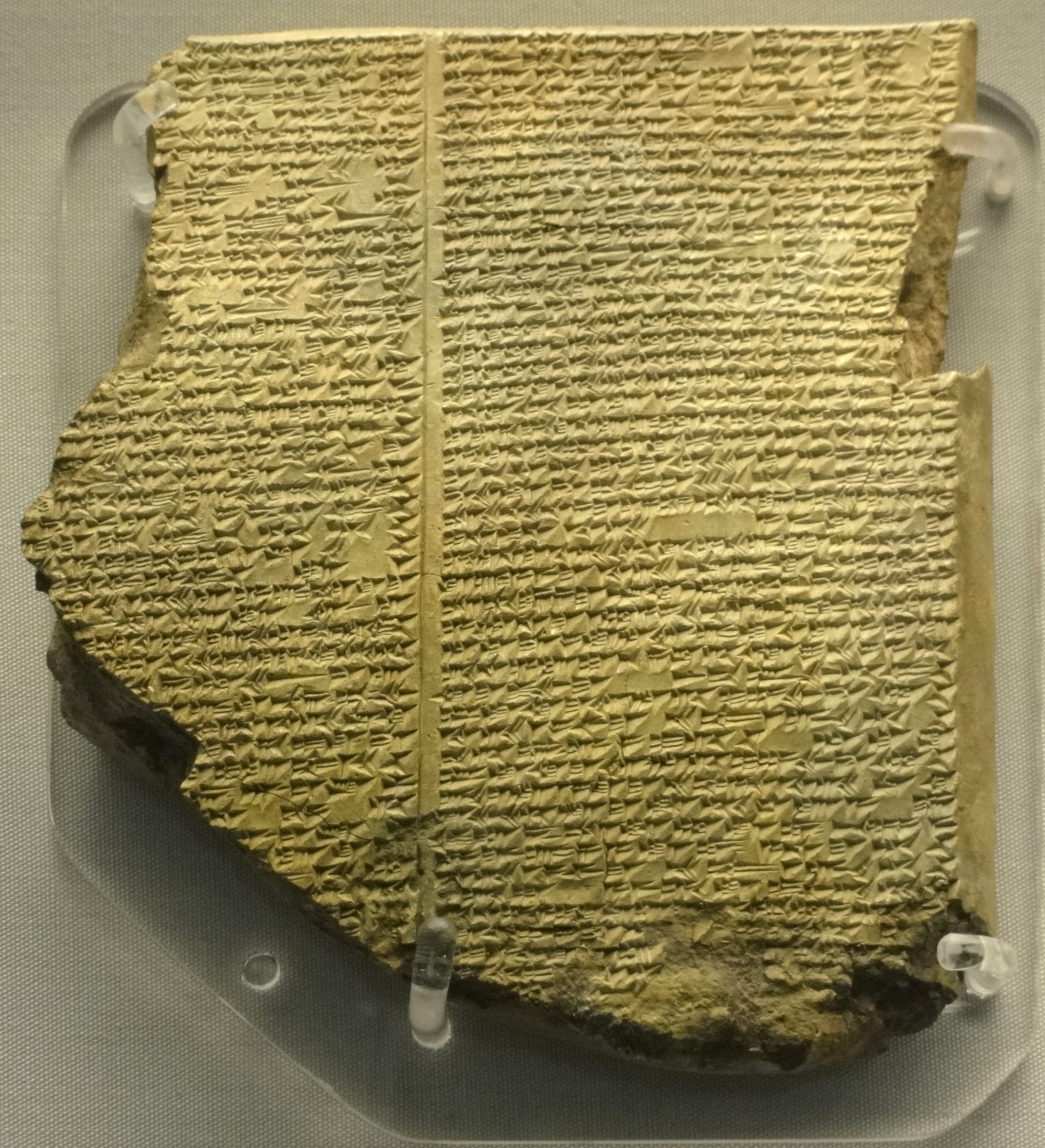
Tablet from the Library of Ashurbanipal containing part of the Epic of Gilgamesh

The first libraries consisted of archives of the earliest form of writing – the clay tablets in cuneiform script discovered in Ebla in present-day Syria; and in temple rooms in Sumer, present-day Iraq. About an inch thick, tablets came in various shapes and sizes. Mud-like clay was placed in the wooden frames, and the surface was smoothed for writing and allowed to dry until damp. After being inscribed, the clay dried in the sun or, for a harder finish, was baked in a kiln. For storage, tablets could be stacked on edge, side by side, the contents described by a title written on the edge that faced out and was readily seen. The first libraries appeared five thousand years ago in Southwest Asia's Fertile Crescent, an area that ran from Mesopotamia to the Nile in Africa. Known as the cradle of civilization, the Fertile Crescent was the birthplace of writing, sometime before 3000 BC. (Murray, Stuart A.P.) These archives, which mainly consisted of the records of commercial transactions or inventories, mark the end of prehistory and the start of history.

Things were very similar in the government and temple records on papyrus of Ancient Egypt. The earliest discovered private archives were kept at Ugarit; besides correspondence and inventories, texts of myths may have been standardized practice-texts for teaching new scribes.

Over 30,000 clay tablets from the Library of Ashurbanipal have been discovered at Nineveh, providing modern scholars with a wealth of Mesopotamian literary, religious and administrative works. Among the findings were the Enuma Elish, also known as the Epic of Creation, which depicts a traditional Babylonian view of creation, the Epic of Gilgamesh, a large selection of "omen texts" including Enuma Anu Enlil which "contained omens dealing with the moon, its visibility, eclipses, and conjunction with planets and fixed stars, the sun, its corona, spots, and eclipses, the weather, namely lightning, thunder, and clouds, and the planets and their visibility, appearance, and stations," and astronomic/astrological texts, as well as standard lists used by scribes and scholars such as word lists, bilingual vocabularies, lists of signs and synonyms, and lists of medical diagnoses.

The tablets were stored in various containers, such as wooden boxes, woven baskets of reeds, or clay shelves. The "libraries" were cataloged using colophons, which are a publisher's imprint on the spine of a book, or in this case, a tablet. The colophons stated the series name, the title of the tablet, and any extra information the scribe needed to indicate. Eventually, the clay tablets were organized by subject and size. Due to limited bookshelf space older tablets were removed, which is why some were missing from the excavated cities in Mesopotamia.

According to the legend, mythical philosopher Laozi was the keeper of books in the earliest library in China, which belonged to the Imperial Zhou dynasty. Also, evidence of catalogs found in some destroyed ancient libraries illustrates the presence of librarians.

== Classical period ==
Persia at the time of the Achaemenid Empire (550–330 BC) was home to some outstanding libraries that were serving two main functions: keeping the records of administrative documents (e.g., transactions, governmental orders, and budget allocation within and between the Satrapies and the central ruling State) and collection of resources on different sets of principles e.g. medical science, astronomy, history, geometry, and philosophy.

In 1933 University of Chicago excavated an impressive collection of clay tablets in Persepolis that indicated the Achaemenids' mastery of recording, classifying, and storing a broad range of data. This archive is believed to be the administrative backbone of their ruling system throughout the vast territory of Persia. The baked tablets are written in three main languages: Old Persian, Elamite, and Babylonian. The cuneiform texts cover various contents from records of sales, taxes, payments, treasury details and food storage to remarkable social, artistic and philosophical aspects of an ordinary life in the Empire. This priceless collection of tablets, known as the Persepolis Fortification Archive, is property of Iran. A part of this impressive library archive is now kept in Iran while a major proportion is still in the hands of the Chicago Oriental Institute as a long-term loan for the purpose of studying, analyzing, and translating.

Some scholars believed that massive resources of archives and resources in different streams of science were transferred from Persia's main libraries to Egypt upon the conquest of Alexander III of Macedon. The materials were later translated into Latin, Egyptian, Coptic, and Greek and shaped a remarkable body of science in the Library of Alexandria. The materials that were not transferred are said to have been set on fire and burnt by the Alexander militants.

Less historically tested claims have also reported a sizeable building in Isfahan, Jey, named Sarouyeh, which was being used by Iran's ancient dynasties to store collections of precious books and manuscripts. At least three Islamic scholars, al-Biruni, Abu Ma'shar al-Balkhi, and Hamza al-Isfahani, have named this hidden library in their works. The same references claimed that this treasury was discovered in early Islam and the valuable books were selected, bound, and transferred to Baghdad for later reading and translating. As reported by observers, at the time of unearthing the archive, the manuscripts' alphabet was entirely unknown to that ordinary people.

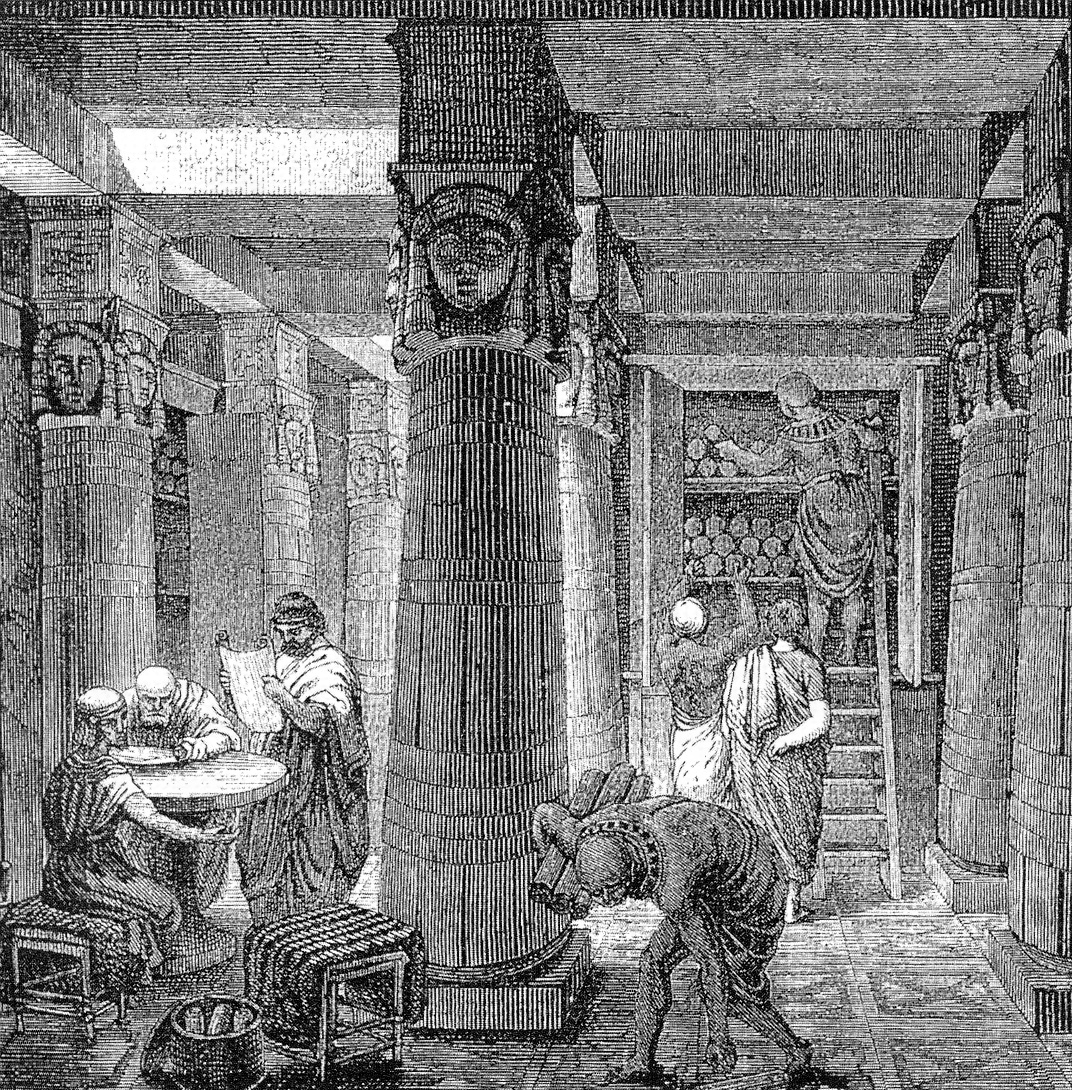
Artistic rendering of the Library of Alexandria, based on some archaeological evidence

The Library of Alexandria, in Egypt, was the largest and most significant great library of the ancient world. It flourished under the patronage of the Ptolemaic dynasty and functioned as a major center of scholarship from its construction in the 3rd century BC until the Roman conquest of Egypt in 30 BC. The library was conceived and opened either during the reign of Ptolemy I Soter (323–283 BC) or during the reign of his son Ptolemy II (283–246 BC). An early organization system was in place at Alexandria (compare the Pinakes).

The Library of Celsus in Ephesus, Anatolia, now part of Selçuk, Turkey was built in honor of the Roman Senator Tiberius Julius Celsus Polemaeanus (completed in AD 135) by Celsus' son, Tiberius Julius Aquila Polemaeanus (consul, 110). The library was built to store 12,000 scrolls and to serve as a monumental tomb for Celsus. The library's ruins were hidden under the debris of the city of Ephesus which was deserted in the early Middle Ages. In 1903, Austrian excavations led to this hidden heap of rubble that had collapsed during an earthquake. The donator's son built the library to honor his father's memory and construction began around 113 or 114. Unfortunately, the library was subject to both a fire and an earthquake that destroyed the majority of the building. Despite modern reconstructive efforts, only the façade (the front of the building) was able to be rebuilt.

Private or personal libraries made up of written books (as opposed to the state or institutional records kept in archives) appeared in classical Greece in the 5th century BC. The celebrated book collectors of Hellenistic Antiquity were listed in the late 2nd century in Deipnosophistae. All these libraries were Greek; the cultivated Hellenized diners in Deipnosophistae pass over the libraries of Rome in silence. By the time of Augustus there were public libraries near the forums of Rome: there were libraries in the Porticus Octaviae near the Theatre of Marcellus, in the temple of Apollo Palatinus, and in the Ulpian Library in the Forum of Trajan. The state archives were kept in a structure on the slope between the Roman Forum and the Capitoline Hill.

Private libraries appeared during the late republic: Seneca inveighed against libraries fitted out for show by illiterate owners who scarcely read their titles in the course of a lifetime, but displayed the scrolls in bookcases (armaria) of citrus wood inlaid with ivory that ran right to the ceiling: "by now, like bathrooms and hot water, a library is got up as standard equipment for a fine house (domus)". Libraries were amenities suited to a villa, such as Cicero's at Tusculum, Maecenas's several villas, or Pliny the Younger's, all described in surviving letters. At the Villa of the Papyri at Herculaneum, apparently the villa of Caesar's father-in-law, the Greek library has been partly preserved in volcanic ash; archaeologists speculate that a Latin library, kept separate from the Greek one, may await discovery at the site.

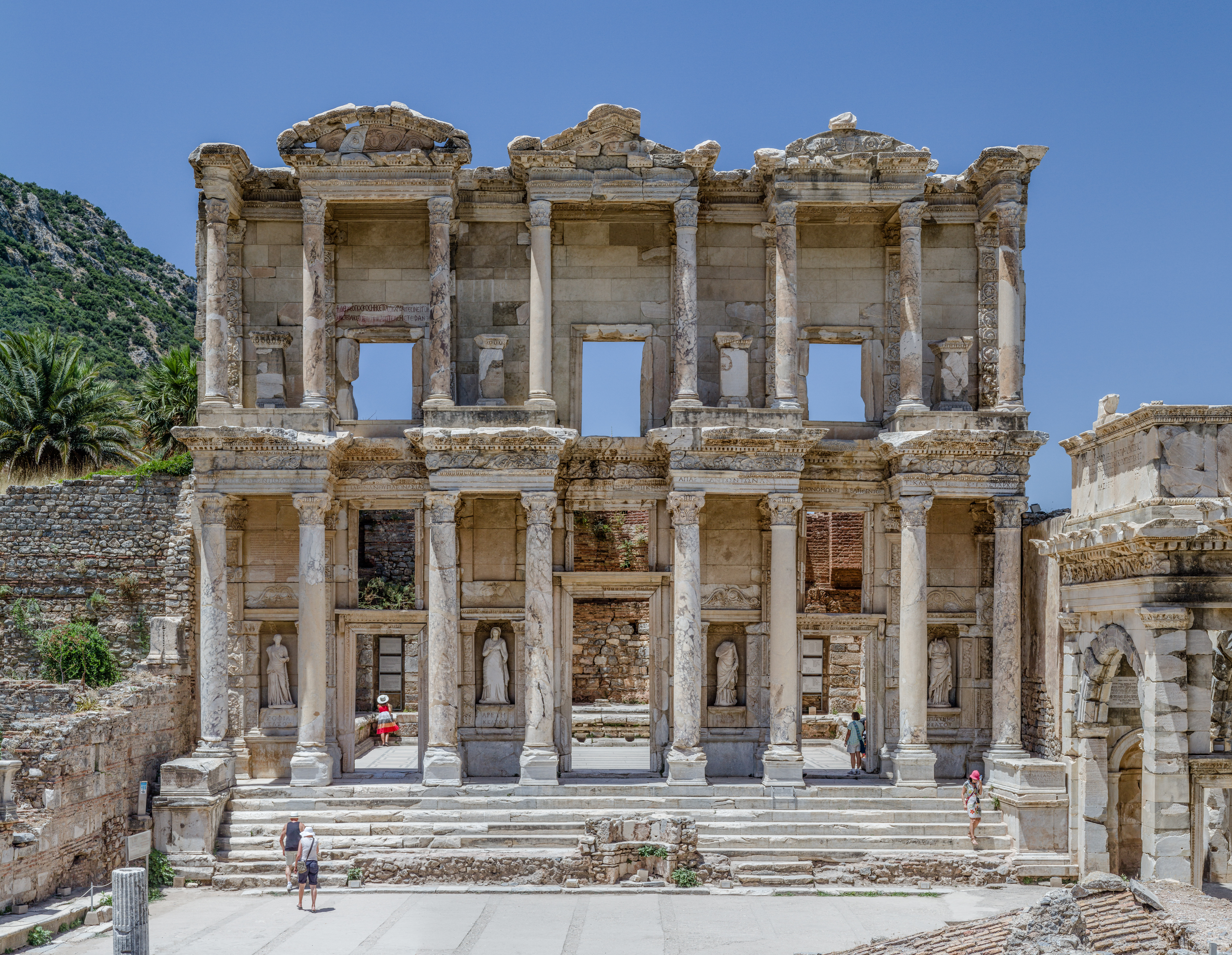
Remains of the Library of Celsus at Ephesus

In the West, the first public libraries were established under the Roman Empire as each succeeding emperor strove to open one or many which outshone that of his predecessor. Rome's first public library was established by Asinius Pollio. Pollio was a lieutenant of Julius Caesar and one of his most ardent supporters. After his military victory in Illyria, Pollio felt he had enough fame and fortune to create what Julius Caesar had sought for a long time: a public library to increase the prestige of Rome and rival the one in Alexandria. Pollios's library, the Anla Libertatis, which was housed in the Atrium Libertatis, was centrally located near the Forum Romanum. It was the first to employ an architectural design that separated works into Greek and Latin. All subsequent Roman public libraries will have this design. At the conclusion of Rome's civil wars following the death of Marcus Antonius in 30 BC, the Emperor Augustus sought to reconstruct many of Rome's damaged buildings. During this construction, Augustus created two more public libraries. The first was the library of the Temple of Apollo on the Palatine, often called the Palatine library, and the second was the library of the Porticus Octaviae, although there is some debate that the Porticus library was actually built by Octavia. Unfortunately, the library of the Porticus Octaviae would be later destroyed in the disastrous fire of Titus that broke out in AD 80.

Two more libraries were added by the Emperor Tiberius on Palatine Hill and one by Vespasian after 70. Vespasian's library was constructed in the Forum of Vespasian, also known as the Forum of Peace, and became one of Rome's principal libraries. The Bibliotheca Pacis was built along the traditional model and had two large halls with rooms for Greek and Latin libraries containing the works of Galen and Lucius Aelius. One of the best preserved was the ancient Ulpian Library built by the Emperor Trajan. Completed in 112/113 AD, the Ulpian Library was part of Trajan's Forum built on the Capitoline Hill. Trajan's Column separated the Greek and Latin rooms which faced each other. The structure was approximately fifty feet high with the peak of the roof reaching almost seventy feet.

Unlike the Greek libraries, readers had direct access to the scrolls, which were kept on shelves built into the walls of a large room. Reading or copying was normally done in the room itself. The surviving records give only a few instances of lending features. Most of the large Roman baths were also cultural centres, built from the start with a library, a two-room arrangement with one room for Greek and one for Latin texts.

Libraries were filled with parchment scrolls as at Library of Pergamum and on papyrus scrolls as at Alexandria: the export of prepared writing materials was a staple of commerce. There were a few institutional or royal libraries which were open to an educated public (such as the Serapeum collection of the Library of Alexandria, once the largest library in the ancient world), but on the whole collections were private. In those rare cases where it was possible for a scholar to consult library books there seems to have been no direct access to the stacks. In all recorded cases the books were kept in a relatively small room where the staff went to get them for the readers, who had to consult them in an adjoining hall or covered walkway. Most of the works in catalogs were of a religious nature, such as volumes of the Bible or religious service books. "In a number of cases the library was entirely theological and liturgical, and in the greater part of the libraries the non-ecclesiastical content did not reach one third of the total" In addition to these types of works, in some libraries during that time Plato was especially popular. In the early Middle Ages, Aristotle was more popular. Additionally, there was quite a bit of censoring within libraries of the time; many works that were "scientific and metaphysical" were not included in the majority of libraries during that time period. Latin authors were better represented within library holdings and Roman works were less represented. Cicero was also an especially popular author along with the histories of Sallust. Additionally, Virgil was universally represented at most of the medieval libraries of the time. One of the most popular was Ovid, mentioned by approximately twenty French catalogues and nearly thirty German ones. Surprisingly, old Roman textbooks on grammar were still being used at that time.

In 213 BC during the reign of Emperor Qin Shi Huang most books were ordered destroyed. The Han Dynasty (202 BC – 220 AD) reversed this policy for replacement copies, and created three imperial libraries. Liu Xin a curator of the imperial library was the first to establish a library classification system and the first book notation system. At this time the library catalog was written on scrolls of fine silk and stored in silk bags. Important new technological innovations include the use of paper and block printing. Wood-block printing, facilitated the large-scale reproduction of classic Buddhist texts which were avidly collected in many private libraries that flourished during the Tang dynasty (618–906 AD).

The Ming Dynasty in 1407 founded the imperial library, the Wen Yuan Pavilion. It also sponsored the massive compilation of the Yongle Encyclopedia, containing 11,000 volumes including copies of over 7000 books. It was soon destroyed, but similar very large compilations appeared in 1725 and 1772.

== Late antiquity ==
In Persia, collection of books once again attracted both rulers and priests throughout the Sassanid Empire (224 - 651 AD) once the country could gain a relatively political and economic stability. Priests intended to compile the existing Zoroastrianism manuscripts from all over the territory and rulers were keen on the consolidation and promotion of science. At the time, many Zoroastrian fire temples were co-located with local libraries that were designed to collect and promote the religious contents. Academy of Gundeshapur being built by Shapur I can well-represents the Sasanid Kings willingness for collection and consolidation of science resources. The academy comprised an extensive library, a hospital and an academy. Enriching the library resources, the academy constantly was sending ambassadors to widespread geographical regions e.g. China, Rome and India to inscribe the manuscripts, codices, and books; translate them to Pahlavi from diverse languages e.g. Sanskrit, Greek and Syriac and bring them back to the centre.

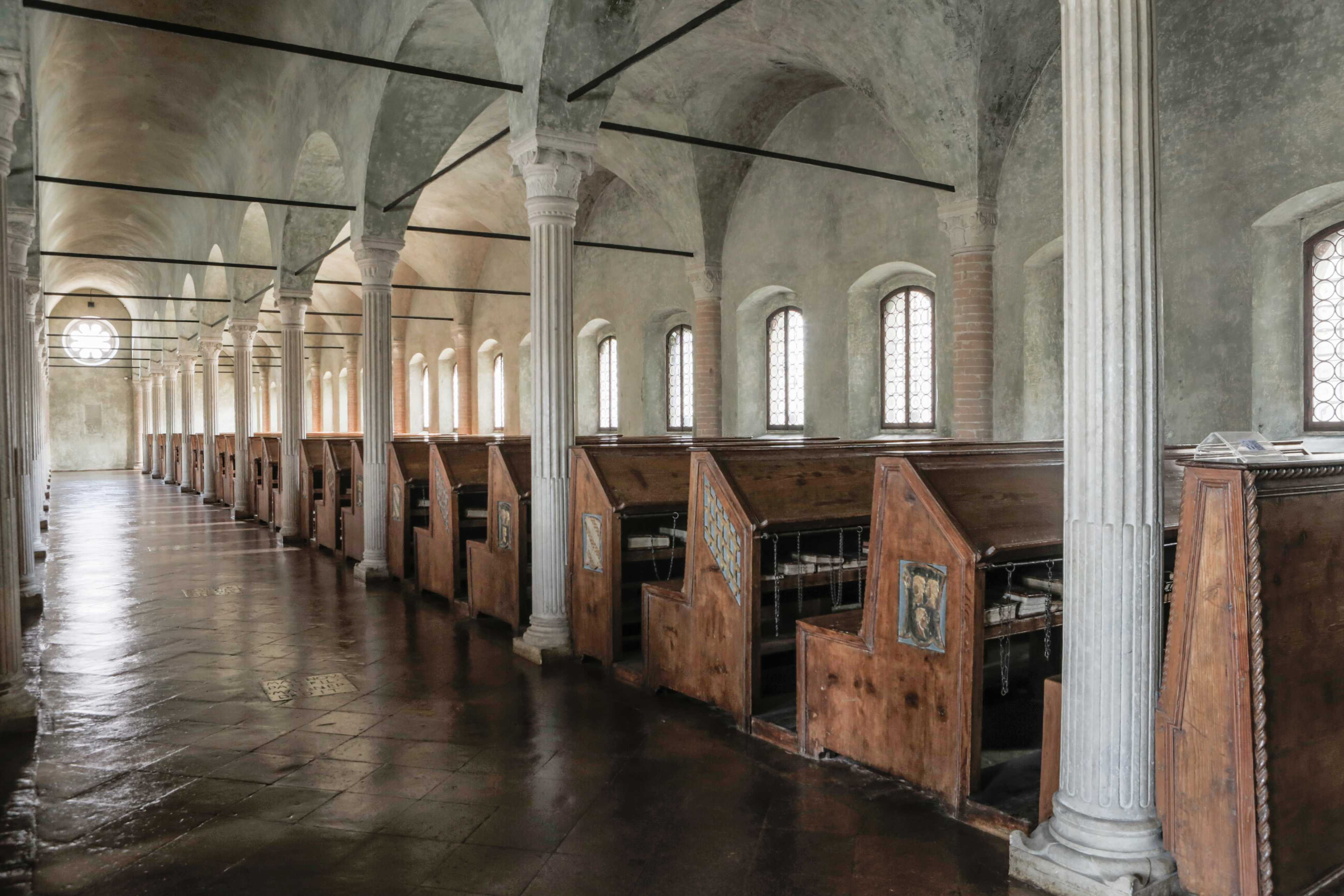
Malatestiana Library of Cesena, the first European civic library

During the Late Antiquity and Middle Ages periods, there was no Rome of the kind that ruled the Mediterranean for centuries and spawned the culture that produced twenty-eight public libraries in the urbs Roma. The empire had been divided then later re-united again under Constantine the Great who moved the capital of the Roman Empire in 330 AD to the city of Byzantium which was renamed Constantinople. The Roman intellectual culture that flourished in ancient times was undergoing a transformation as the academic world moved from laymen to Christian clergy. As the West crumbled, books and libraries flourished and flowed east toward the Byzantine Empire. There, four different types of libraries were established: imperial, patriarchal, monastic, and private. Each had its own purpose and, as a result, their survival varied.

In the West many classical Latin works were copied and were thought fit for preservation in a parchment or codex, the progenitor of the modern book, but few Greek works because of the growing unfamiliarity with the language. In the East, however, this was not the case as many of these classical Greek and Roman texts were copied. "[F]ormerly paper was rare and expensive, so every spare page of available books was pressed into use. Thus a seventeenth-century edition of the Ignatian epistles, in Mar Saba, had copied onto its last pages, probably in the early eighteenth century, a passage allegedly from the letters of Clement of Alexandria". Old manuscripts were also used to bind new books because of the costs associated with paper and also because of the scarcity of new paper.

In Byzantium, much of this work devoted to preserving Hellenistic thought in codex form was performed in scriptoriums by monks. While monastic library scriptoriums flourished throughout the East and West, the rules governing them were generally the same. Barren and sun-lit rooms (because candles were a source of fire) were major features of the scriptorium that was both a model of production and monastic piety. Monks scribbled away for hours a day, interrupted only by meals and prayers. With such production, medieval monasteries began to accumulate large libraries. These libraries were devoted solely to the education of the monks and were seen as essential to their spiritual development. Although most of these texts that were produced were Christian in nature, many monastic leaders saw common virtues in the Greek classics. As a result, many of these Greek works were copied, and thus saved, in monastic scriptoriums.

When Europe passed into the Middle Ages, Byzantine scriptoriums laboriously preserved Greco-Roman classics. As a result, Byzantium revived Classical models of education and libraries. The Imperial Library of Constantinople was an important depository of ancient knowledge. Constantine himself wanted such a library but his short rule denied him the ability to see his vision to fruition. His son Constantius II made this dream a reality and created an imperial library in a portico of the royal palace. He ruled for 24 years and accelerated the development of the library and the intellectual culture that came with such a vast accumulation of books.

Constantius II appointed Themistius, a pagan philosopher and teacher, as chief architect of this library building program. Themistius set about a bold program to create an imperial public library that would be the centerpiece of the new intellectual capital of Constantinople. Classical authors such as Plato, Aristotle, Demosthenes, Isocrates, Thucydides, Homer, and Zeno were sought. Themeistius hired calligraphers and craftsman to produce the actual codices. He also appointed educators and created a university-like school centered around the library.

After the death of Constantius II, Julian the Apostate, a bibliophile intellectual, ruled briefly for less than three years. Despite this, he had a profound impact on the imperial library and sought both Christian and pagan books for its collections. Later, the Emperor Valens hired Greek and Latin scribes full-time with from the royal treasury to copy and repair manuscripts.

At its height in the 5th century, the Imperial Library of Constantinople had 120,000 volumes and was the largest library in Europe. A fire in 477 consumed the entire library but it was rebuilt only to be burned again in 726, 1204, and in 1453 when Constantinople fell to the Ottoman Turks.

Patriarchal libraries fared no better, and sometimes worse, than the Imperial Library. The Library of the Patriarchate of Constantinople was founded most likely during the reign of Constantine the Great in the 4th century. As a theological library, it was known to have employed a library classification system. It also served as a repository of several ecumenical councils such as the Council of Nicea, Council of Ephesus, and the Council of Chalcedon. The library, which employed a librarian and assistants, may have been originally located in the Patriarch's official residence before it was moved to the Thomaites Triclinus in the 7th century. While much is not known about the actual library itself, it is known that many of its contents were subject to destruction as religious in-fighting ultimately resulted in book burnings.

During this period, small private libraries existed. Many of these were owned by church members and the aristocracy. Teachers also were known to have small personal libraries as well as wealthy bibliophiles who could afford the highly ornate books of the period.

Thus, in the 6th century, at the close of the Classical period, the great libraries of the Mediterranean world remained those of Constantinople and Alexandria. Cassiodorus, minister to Theodoric, established a monastery at Vivarium in the toe of Italy (modern Calabria) with a library where he attempted to bring Greek learning to Latin readers and preserve texts both sacred and secular for future generations. As its unofficial librarian, Cassiodorus not only collected as many manuscripts as he could, he also wrote treatises aimed at instructing his monks in the proper uses of reading and methods for copying texts accurately. In the end, however, the library at Vivarium was dispersed and lost within a century.

Through Origen and especially the scholarly presbyter Pamphilus of Caesarea, an avid collector of books of Scripture, the theological school of Caesarea won a reputation for having the most extensive ecclesiastical library of the time, containing more than 30,000 manuscripts: Gregory Nazianzus, Basil the Great, Jerome and others came and studied there.

== Islamic intervention ==
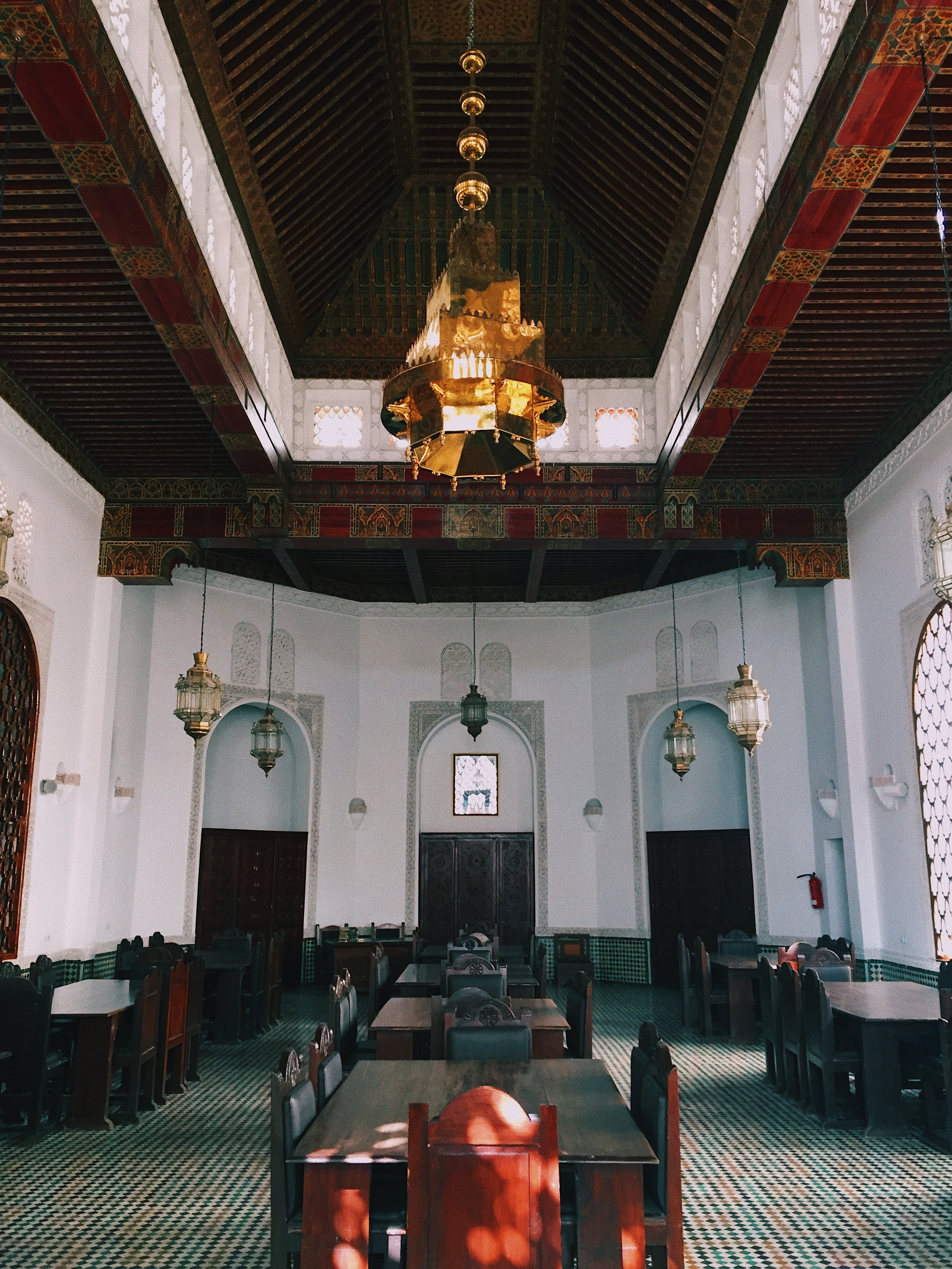
Reading room of Al-Qarawiyyin Library, Fez, Morocco

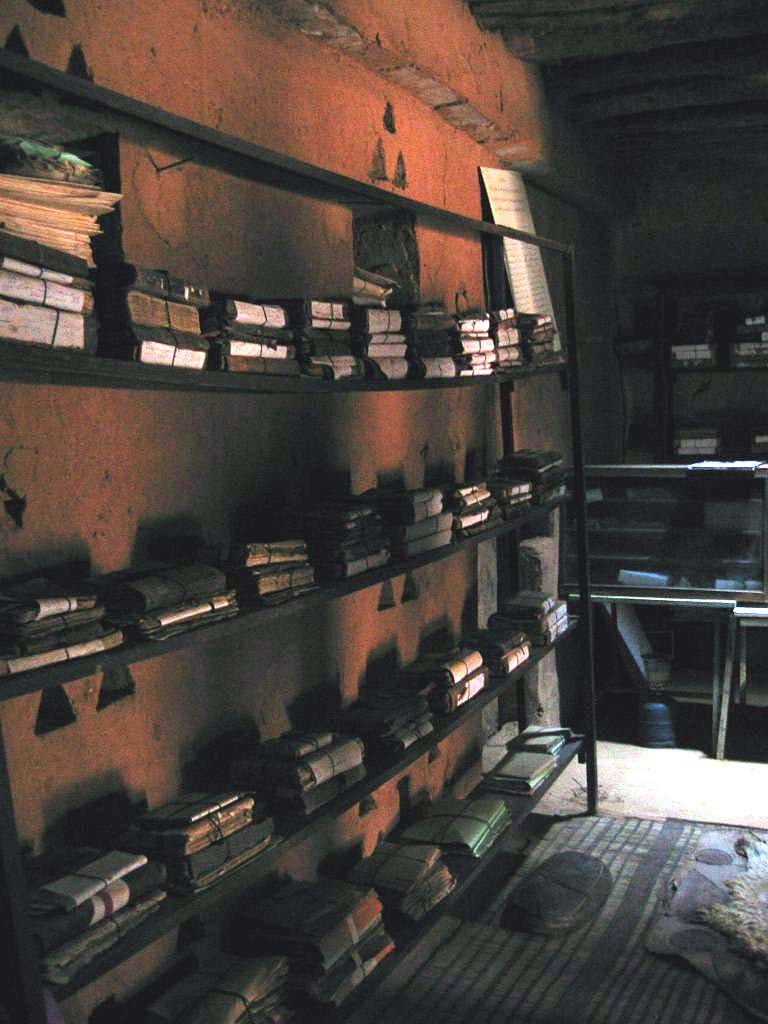
Inside a Qur'anic library in Chinguetti, Mauritania

The need for the preservation of the Quran and the Traditions of Muhammad is what primarily inspired Muslims to develop collections of writings. Mosques that were playing a central role in Muslims' day-to-day life gradually welcomed incorporated libraries that stored and preserved all types of knowledge, from devotional books like Quran to books on philosophy, geography and science.

The centrality of the Qurʾān as the prototype of the written word in Islam bears significantly on the role of books within its intellectual tradition and educational system. An early impulse in Islam was to manage reports of events, key figures and their sayings and actions. Thus, "the onus of being the last 'People of the Book' engendered an ethos of librarianship" early on and the establishment of important book repositories throughout the Muslim world have occurred ever since.

By the 8th century China's art of papermaking was acquired by Iranians and then developed across the whole Muslim world. From the art, Muslims developed papermaking into an industry. As a result of this technical enhancement, the books were more easily manufactured and they were more broadly accessible. Coincided with the encouragement of science and a breakthrough in the translation movement, public and private libraries started to boost all around Islamic lands. "libraries (royal, public, specialized, private) had become common and bookmen (authors, translators, copiers, illuminators, librarians, booksellers' collectors) from all classes and sections of society, of all nationalities and ethnic backgrounds, vied with each other in the production and distribution of books."

A series of libraries within the Islamic territories were founded and flourished alongside the Islam spread. Abbasid Caliphs were patrons of learning and collection of ancient and contemporary literature. This enthusiasm actualized as royal libraries in Baghdad, a ruling heart of Islamic lands. The Caliphs' support for retrieving, copying and collecting the resources expanded all sorts of expertise associated with books. The emergence of theological schools, later on, multiplied the libraries. These schools that were called Dar al Ilm, Madrasa or House of Knowledge were each endowed by Islamic sects with the purpose of representing their tenets as well as promoting the dissemination of knowledge. Rich libraries were inseparable components of 'Houses of knowledge'. The Nizamiyya of Baghdad, founded by Nizam al-Mulk, and the Mustansiriyya Madrasa, founded by al-Mustansir, were two most renowned and popular schools which attracted passionate students all across Muslim lands.

The Fatimids (r. 909–1171) and their successors at Alamut also possessed many great libraries within their domains, attracting scholars from every creed and origin. The historian Ibn Abi Tayyi' describes the Fatimid palace library, which probably contained the largest trove of literature on earth at the time, as a "wonder of the world". Similarly, at the torching of the Alamut library, the conqueror Juwayni boasts that its fame "had spread throughout the world".

Through these major knowledge expansion, libraries transformed into vibrant centers of the Islamic communities. These knowledge sharing centers were being attended constantly by varied patrons from mature scholars and enthusiastic students to poets and courtiers. Major libraries often employed translators and copyists in large numbers, in order to render into Arabic the bulk of the available Persian, Greek, Roman and Sanskrit non-fiction and the classics of literature. At the time libraries were the place that books and manuscripts were collected, read, copied, reproduced and borrowed by students, masters and even ordinary people. New resources could be acquired in a range of ways, with bequest, waqf, the major contributor. Based on this well-grounded tradition, many scholars and men of wealth bequeathed their book collections to the mosques, shrines, libraries and schools through which their private collection would be not only properly preserved but also made accessible to the whole community.

At the time even local rulers demonstrated their passion for knowledge by designing and developing public libraries that could stand out in both aesthetic features and creating a space that maximizes the patrons' comfort. Al-Maqdisi, a Muslim Geographer, once got stunned by stepping into one of these well-designed libraries in Shiraz:

a complex of buildings surrounded by gardens with lakes and waterways. The buildings were topped with domes, and comprised an upper and a lower storey with a total, according to the chief official, of 360 rooms....In each department, catalogues were placed on a shelf... the rooms were furnished with carpets...

Though this flowering of Islamic learning ceased centuries later when learning began declining in the Islamic world, after many of these libraries were destroyed by Mongol invasions. Others were victim of wars and religious strife in the Islamic world. Many of those priceless manuscripts were transferred into European libraries and museums during the colonial period. However, a few examples of these medieval libraries, such as the libraries of Chinguetti in West Africa, remain intact and relatively unchanged.

The contents of these Islamic libraries were copied by Christian monks in Muslim/Christian border areas, particularly Spain and Sicily. From there they eventually made their way into other parts of Christian Europe. These copies joined works that had been preserved directly by Christian monks from Greek and Roman originals, as well as copies Western Christian monks made of Byzantine works. The resulting conglomerate libraries are the basis of every modern library today.

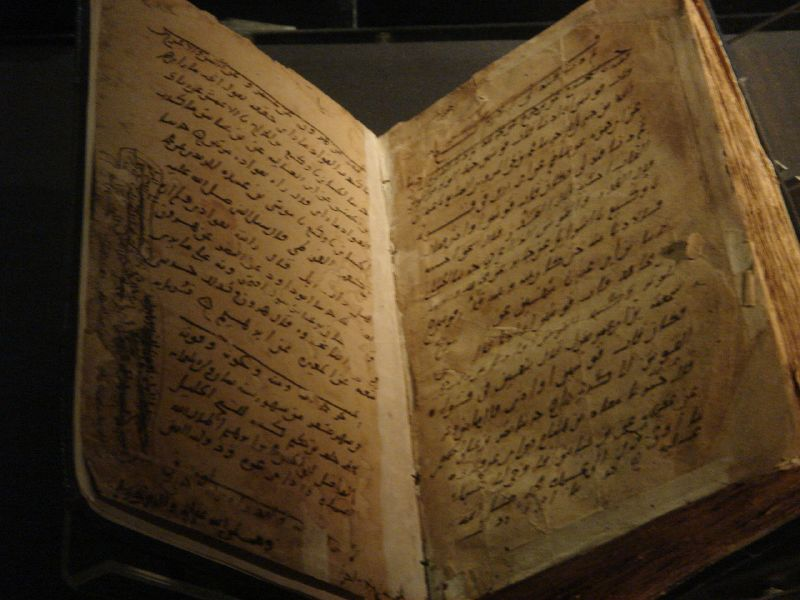
Qur'an manuscript on display at the Bibliotheca Alexandrina

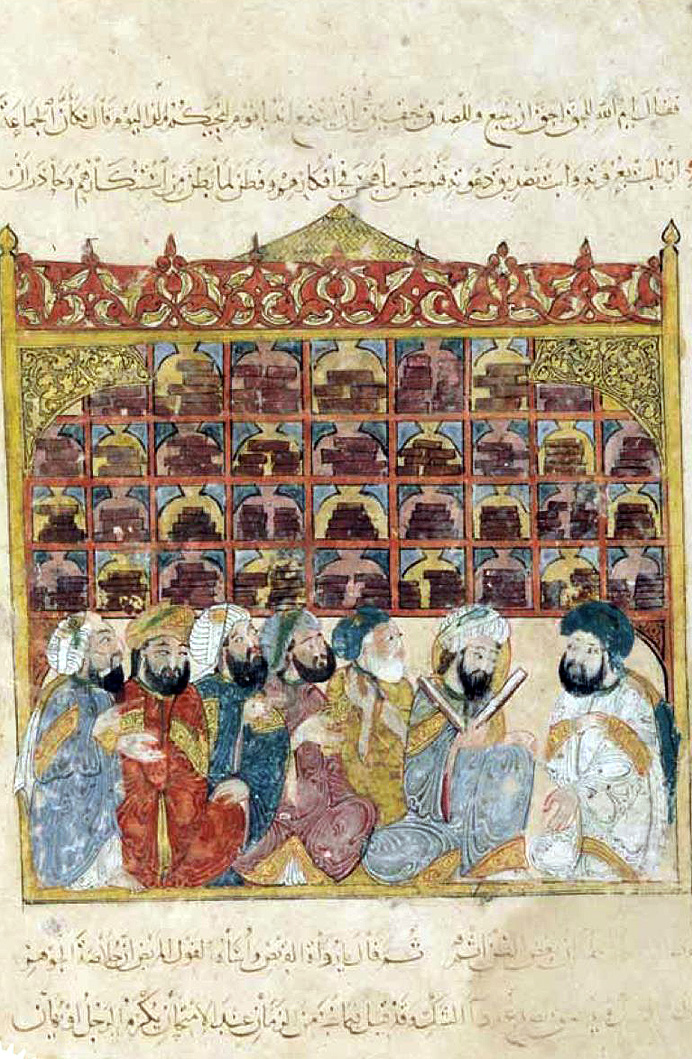
Miniature showing a library in Baghdad. 13th century manuscript of the celebrated book "The Assemblies" written by Hariri and illustrated by al-Wasiti.

=== Prominent libraries throughout the Islamic lands ===
- ‌Bait al Hikma (House of Wisdom) or Khizana al Hikma (Treasury of Wisdom)- Baghdad -9th Century: Al-Ma'mun, the seventh Abbasid caliph founded a splendid science center consisting of an observatory for astrologists and a rich library with some very rare and precious resources. Many of those resources were on other and older cultures, thus far, translation was the cornerstone of the institution with professional translators working on Greek, Persian, Indian and Syriac materials.
- Yahya ibn Abi Mansur (Ibn Munajem) Library- 9th century: As a Khalifah's Chief Astrologer, he was the owner of a luxurious palace containing a tremendous library with numerous books in different sets of disciplines and science, in particular, astrology. This library was called "Treasury of Wisdom" or "Khazanah Al-Hekmah".
- Nuh Ibn Mansour Samani Library- Bukhara-10th century: Samanid Empire rulers were famous for showing a considerable passion for culture and science and their consistent support for promoting libraries. Nuh II had a sizable library. Avicenna who was one of the visitors to Mansour's library in Bukhara has described it as extraordinary in terms of the number of volumes and the value of books. Looking for a certain item in medicine, he requested an entry permit from the Sultan to browse the library storage space. The book stack had been composed of plenty of rooms, each room had contained numerous boxes and each box had been filled with stacks of books as he reported.
- Baha al-Dowleh and Azod al-Dowleh Daylami Library-Shiraz- 10th century: These regional rulers from Iranian Daylamites Dynasty were owners of one of the most prominent libraries within the Islamic lands. As stated by al-Muqaddasi, a reputable Islamic historian and geographer, a copy of each and every book he had ever seen during his life and travels, all were presented in Azod al-Dowleh library.

al-Muqaddasi described the library as a complex of buildings surrounded by gardens with lakes and waterways. The buildings were topped with domes, and comprised an upper and a lower storey with a total, according to the chief official, of 360 rooms.... In each department, catalogues were placed on a shelf... the rooms were furnished with carpets.

- The Library of Abu-Nasr Shapur Ibn Ardeshir- Baghdad- 10th century: Abu-Nasr who was a Daylamites' Minister, founded a mega well-known public library in Baghdad that is claimed to hold 10 thousand volumes. The library was destroyed during Baghdad's big fire.
- Sahib ibn Abbad Library-Rey- 10th century: The Iranian Grand Vizier to Buyid rulers established a legendary public library holding around 200,000 volumes. Ibn Abbad who was so proud of this great collection of books once refused the invitation of Samanid rulers to become their Grand Vizier in Bukhara, giving the excuse of attachment to his books that would need around 400 camels to carry on. The library was partially destroyed in 1029 by the troops of the Ghaznavids. As evidence to a large amount of the resources, some scholars claimed that just the library catalogue was equal to 10 volumes.
- Greater Merv or Merv Shahijan set of libraries: Yaqut al-Hamawi, a renowned Moslem bibliographer and geographer, on a way to his continual travels, stopped by Merv and settled there for a while to make the best use of sets of impressive libraries to complement his research studies. He named ten distinct exceptional libraries some are stated to hold more than 12,000 books. Some of Merv's libraries resources were highly unique and precious not to be found anywhere else, as he stated. Patrons could easily check out a large number of items from these book collections. As Hamawi reported he was allowed to keep more than 200 books on a long period loan.
- Rab'-e Rashidi Library-Maragheh-13th century: Rashid al-Din Hamadani, the Iranian author of Universal History and the Grand Vizier of Sultan Ghazan, was a talented founder of charitable Rab'-e Rashidi Complex and Library. He has elaborated the conditions of using the library resources in a remaining valuable Deed for Endowment (Vaghfnameh) which is of great importance in regards to the applied administrative procedures for running the libraries during the Islamic period:

"This public library (Dar al-Masahef) shall deliver service to researchers for the purpose of studying and copying the resources. Books are allowed to be used within the library. Taking out the library books requires some refundable deposit equates to the half value of the borrowed item. The loan period is not allowed to exceed one month. The borrowed item shall get stamped by the librarian in order to be recognized as the property of the library".

The original Deed manuscript, being kept in National Museum of Tabriz, was added by UNESCO to its Memory of the World international register, recognising it as globally important documentary heritage.

- Timbuktu Library-Timbuktu-11th century: Islamic states in Africa began to see a rapid development in education from the 11th century. Libraries of particular importance would include that of Timbuktu, which held many manuscripts that were important for over 600 years in Ghanan, Mali and Songhai empires. One of the most notable authors was Ahmad Baba who wrote over 40 manuscripts – widely considered as being one of the most influential scholars from Timbuktu. Many of the manuscripts and buildings were destroyed by the Arab-European invasion in 1591 and writers, such as Ahmad Baba were taken into captivity. Despite this and the poor preservation conditions as many as 700,000 manuscripts still survive today.
- Sufiya Library-Aleppo-one of the oldest mosque libraries was located at the city's Grand Umayyad Mosque, contained a large book collection of which 10,000 volumes were reportedly bequeathed by the city's most famous ruler, Prince Sayf al-Dawla.

They were many other sizable libraries in major Islamic cities, e.g. Basrah, Damascus, Isfahan, Tous, Baghdad, Shoush, Mosul and Shiraz.

== Asia ==
Tianyi Ge, library located in Ningbo, Zhejiang Province, China was built in 1561

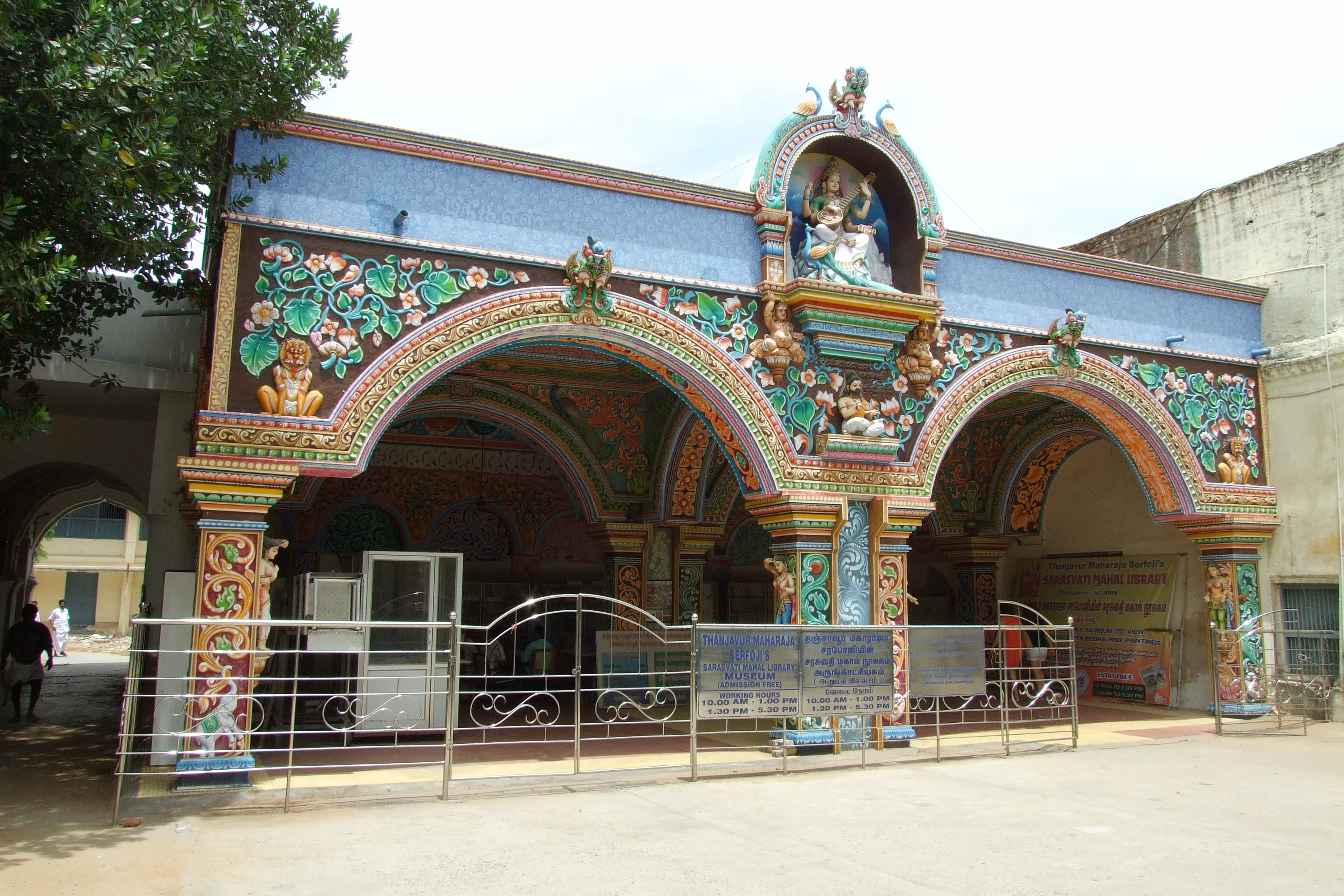
Sarasvati Mahal Library in Thanjavur, India is one of the oldest subsisting libraries in Asia

The spread of religion and philosophy throughout the South and East Asia spurred the development of both writing and books. Chinese emperors were very supportive of this culture. Chinese printing and paper making, which predate Western development, gave birth to a thriving book culture in East Asia. Several Asian religious and philosophical movements are responsible for stimulating learning, printing and book collecting: Buddhism, Confucianism, Taoism, and Jainism. Jainism, a major faith of the Indian subcontinent, had a tradition of religious, scientific, and cultural scholarship. Early practitioners of the faith not only produced scriptural writing the first century BC, but also established some of Asia's earliest libraries. Mainly housed in temples, these libraries later became known as "Jain Knowledge Warehouses" and is responsible for the preservation of hundreds of thousands handwritten manuscripts.

The invention of paper in China allowed the Chinese to create an early form of printing (stone-rubbing). Writings the sixth-century philosopher, Confucius, were originally inscribed on stone tablets. To achieve this early form of printing the Chinese would push soft paper onto the stone, apply ink to the back of the sheet, resulting in a black background with white letters. The Chinese also employed inked carved woodblock to produce printed materials. One of the major Buddhist canons, the Tripitaka, was published in 5,000 volumes using more than 130,000 individual woodblocks. In the eleventh century movable type was developed in China and Koreans established the first foundry for producing movable type. In spite of these developments, woodblock printing remained the norm in China, Korea, and Japan. Each ruler in China compiled its own official written archives. Every emperor decided which philosophical texts, which accounts of history, which rituals of faith, and what poetry and literature would be permitted in the empire; oftentimes chronicling their own version of the previous ruler's history. Confucian and Buddhist writings that were brought to Korea and Japan are directly responsible for the continued development of book publishing and library building in East Asia.

Buddhist scriptures, educational materials, and histories were stored in libraries in pre-modern Southeast Asia. In Burma, a royal library called the Pitakataik was legendarily founded by King Anawrahta; in the 18th century, British envoy Michael Symes, on visiting this library, wrote that "it is not improbable that his Birman majesty may possess a more numerous library than any potentate, from the banks of the Danube to the borders of China". In Thailand libraries called ho trai were built throughout the country, usually on stilts above a pond to prevent bugs from eating at the books.

== European Middle Ages ==
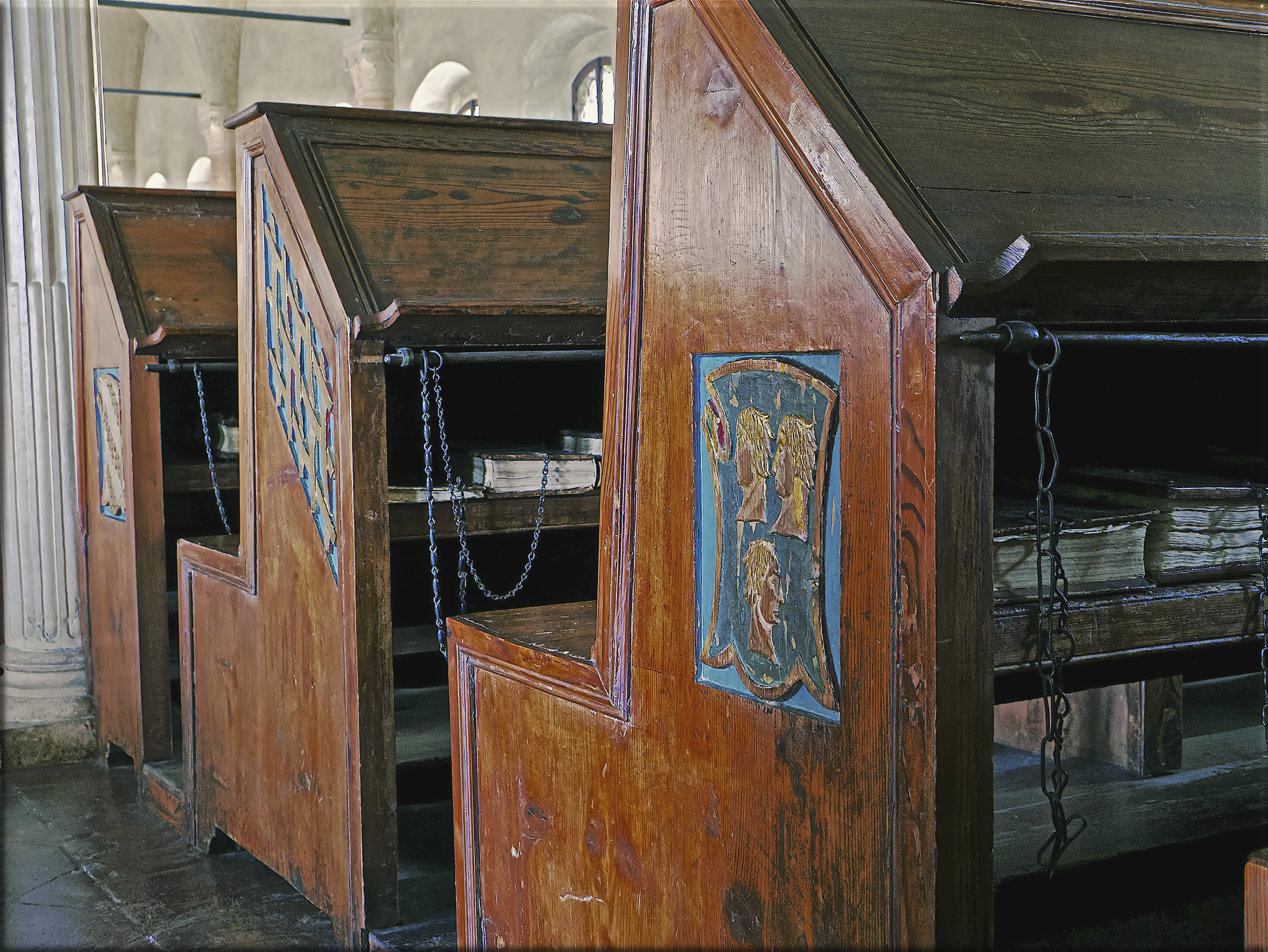
Books chained to the lecterns in the Malatestiana Library, Cesena, Italy

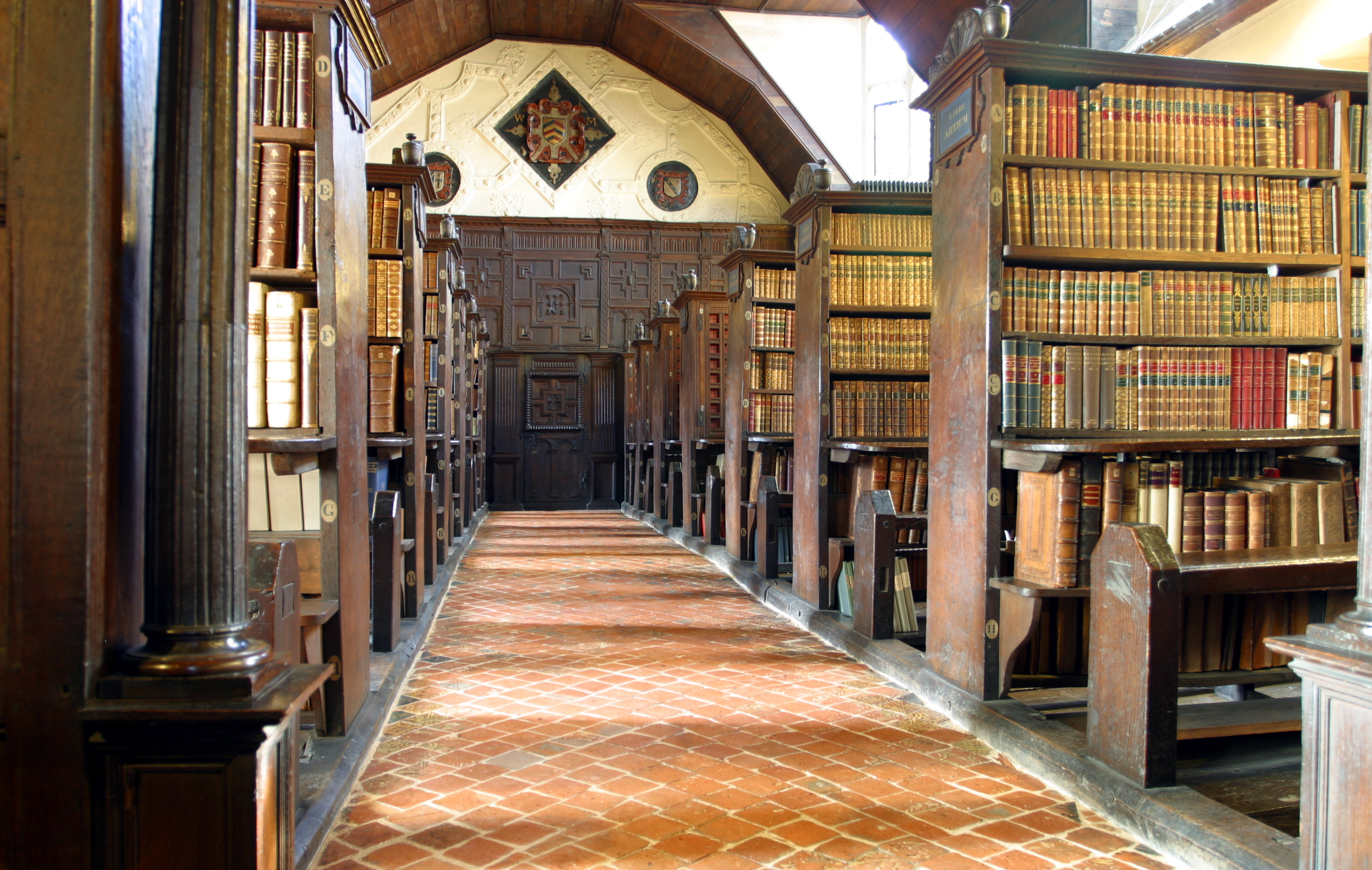
Merton College Library, Oxford, England, established in 1373

In the Early Middle Ages, monastery libraries developed, such as the important one at the Abbey of Montecassino in Italy. Books were usually chained to the shelves, reflecting the fact that manuscripts, which were created via the labour-intensive process of hand copying, were valuable possessions. This hand-copying was often accomplished by travelling monks who made the treks to the sources of knowledge and illumination they sought for learning or to copy the manuscripts held by other monasteries for their own monastic libraries. Besides chaining books to shelves and lecterns, scribes also often inserted a "book curse" to protect books from being stolen. After finishing copying, a scribe often added a curse to the final page that warned of eternal damnation or prolonged physical suffering if the book were stolen.

Despite this protectiveness, many libraries loaned books if provided with security deposits (usually money or a book of equal value). Lending was a means by which books could be copied and spread. In 1212 the council of Paris condemned those monasteries that still forbade loaning books, reminding them that lending is "one of the chief works of mercy." The early libraries located in monastic cloisters and associated with scriptoria were collections of lecterns with books chained to them. Shelves built above and between back-to-back lecterns were the beginning of bookpresses. The chain was attached at the fore-edge of a book rather than to its spine. Book presses came to be arranged in carrels (perpendicular to the walls and therefore to the windows) in order to maximize lighting, with low bookcases in front of the windows. This "stall system" (i.e. fixed bookcases perpendicular to exterior walls pierced by closely spaced windows) was characteristic of English institutional libraries. In European libraries, bookcases were arranged parallel to and against the walls. This "wall system" was first introduced on a large scale in Spain's El Escorial.

Book production was relegated almost exclusively to the larger monasteries, where both monks and lay brothers were copyists and bookbinders. Artists were employed to illuminate pages with elaborate designs, capital letters and pictures. A substantial monastery might have up to 40 scribes at work in the scriptoria; the average scribe would copy two books a year.

The Rule of St. Benedict advised that inventory must be taken of the monastery's possessions, including the books held in the monastic libraries. As a result, the books were cataloged and cared for by the monastic armarius, or librarian. The chief role of the armarius was to organize the use of the library and scriptorium, which involved keeping inventory, inspecting holdings, regulating the use of books, and overseeing the scribes. There are no records to suggest that the inventory or catalog of books followed any formal rules or system. The armarius simply kept inventory lists in order to keep track of what books were part of their collection. The entries on the inventory lists became more complex as time went on from just the author/title/condition of a book to including the portions of the text in order to prevent the volume from being swapped for a less valuable volume. It was intended that the inventory list begin with the Bible, followed by writings of Church Fathers, then works by medieval theologians, ancient authors and finally liberal arts works, however this loose organization system was rarely followed, and it is more likely they were placed in the order the books were displayed in the library reading room. Since there was no definitive way in which the volumes of text were grouped or arranged, users of the library tended to seek help from the armarius instead of locating what they needed on their own.

Also, in Eastern Christianity monastery libraries kept important manuscripts. The most important of them were the ones in the monasteries of Mount Athos for Orthodox Christians, and the library of the Saint Catherine's Monastery in the Sinai Peninsula, Egypt for the Coptic Church.

A special case is constituted by the Jewish medieval libraries. In the absence of institutions dedicated to the production and conservation of manuscripts (excepting the yeshivot), the vast majority of Jewish libraries were semiprivate or private.

== Renaissance ==
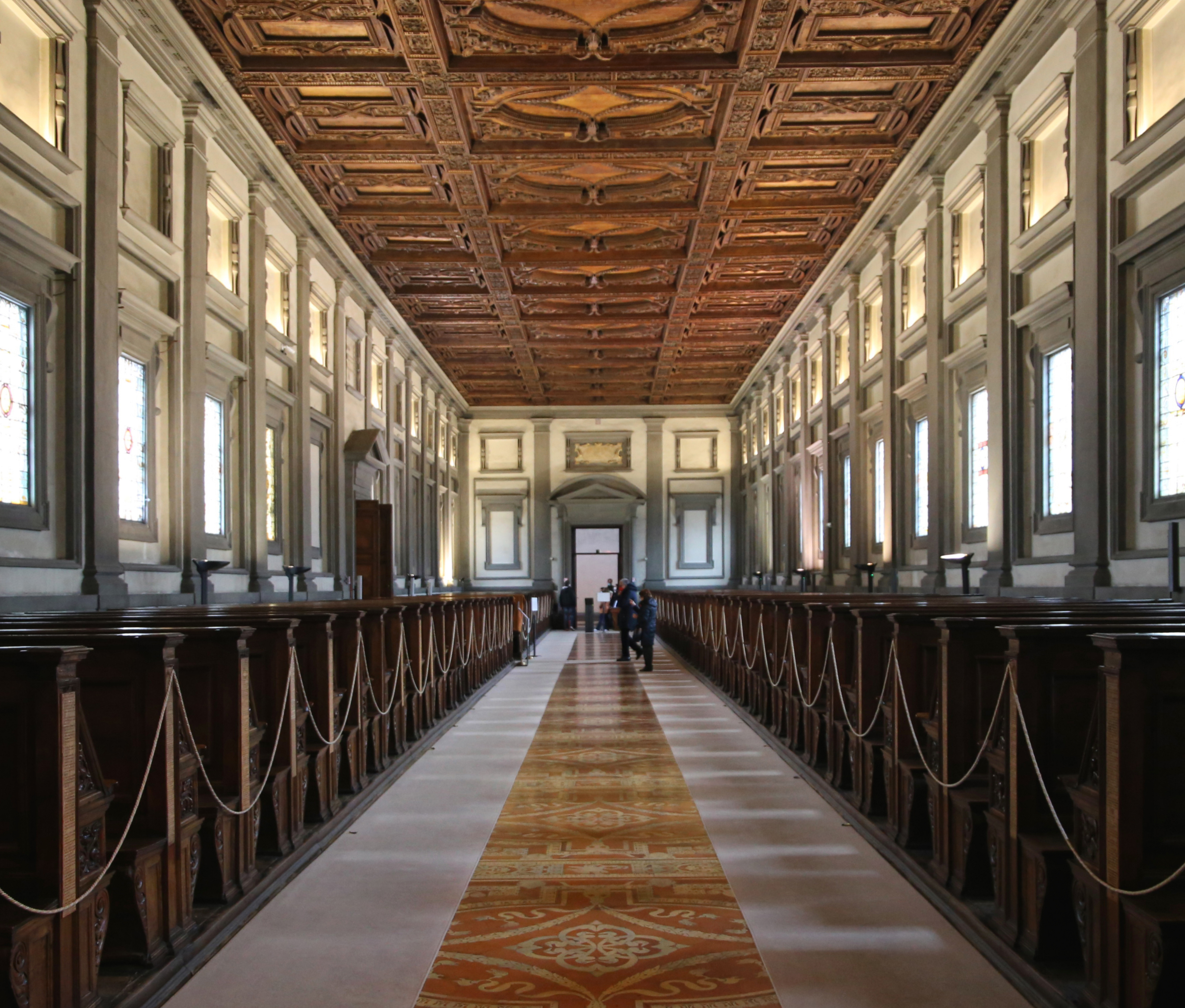
Reading room of the Laurentian Library

From the 15th century in central and northern Italy, libraries of humanists and their enlightened patrons provided a nucleus around which an "academy" of scholars congregated in each Italian city of consequence. Malatesta Novello, lord of Cesena, founded the Malatestiana Library. Cosimo de Medici in Florence established his own collection, which formed the basis of the Laurentian Library. In Rome, the papal collections were brought together by Pope Nicholas V, in separate Greek and Latin libraries, and housed by Pope Sixtus IV, who consigned the Bibliotheca Apostolica Vaticana to the care of his librarian, the humanist Bartolomeo Platina in February 1475.

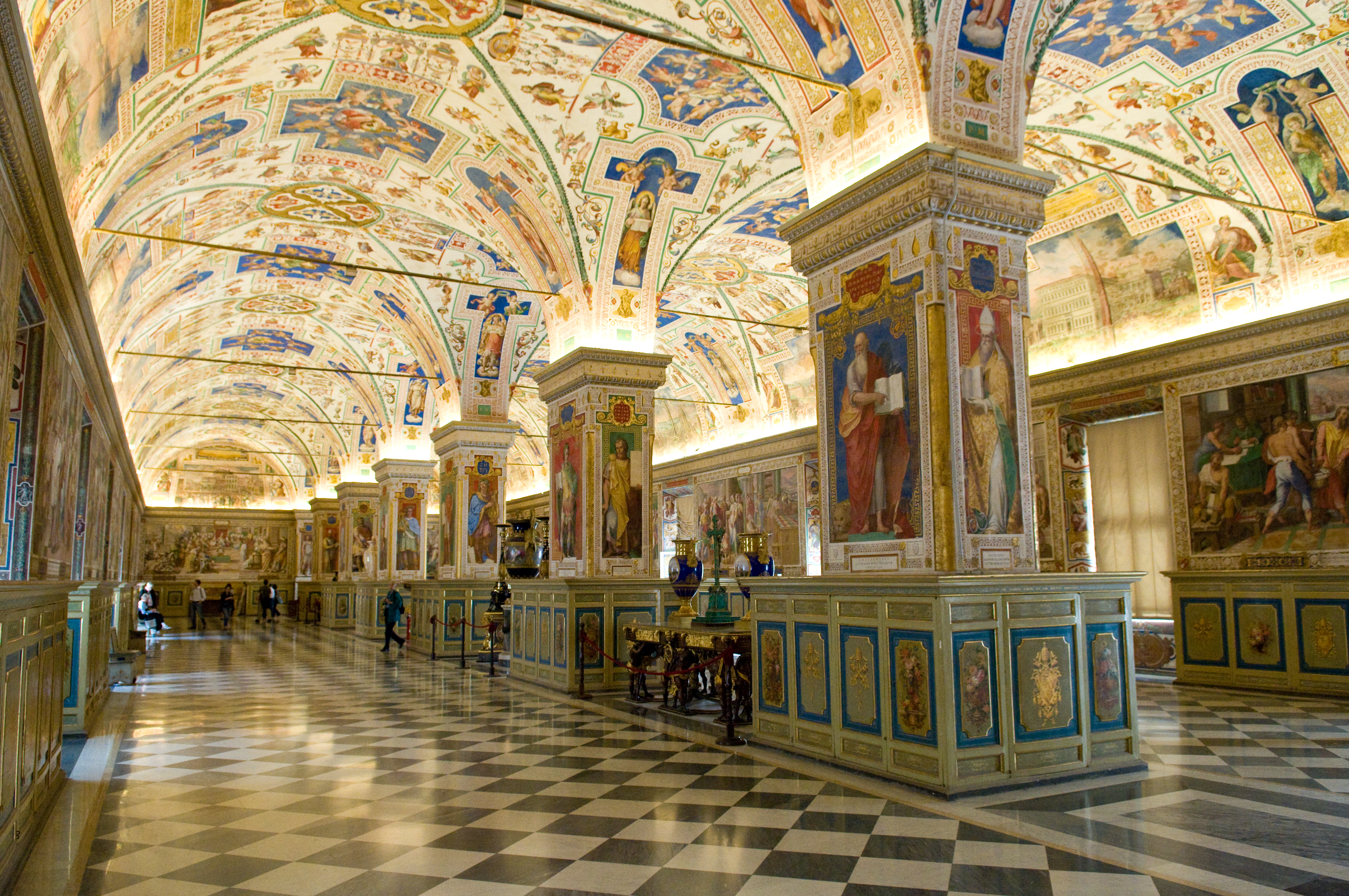
The Sistine Hall of the Vatican Library

The Hungarian Bibliotheca Corviniana was one of the first and largest Renaissance Greek-Latin libraries, established by Matthias Corvinus, King of Hungary between 1458 and 1490. In 1490, the library consisted of about 3,000 codices or "Corvinae". Beatrix of Aragon, Queen of Hungary, encouraged his work with the Bibliotheca Corviniana. After Matthias' death in 1490 many of the manuscripts were taken from library and dispersed, subsequently the Turkish invasion of Hungary in the 16th century saw the remaining valuable manuscripts taken to Turkey.

In the 16th century Sixtus V bisected Bramante's Cortile del Belvedere with a cross-wing to house the Apostolic Library in suitable magnificence. The 16th and 17th centuries saw other privately endowed libraries assembled in Rome: the Vallicelliana, formed from the books of Saint Filippo Neri, with other distinguished libraries such as that of Cesare Baronio, the Biblioteca Angelica founded by the Augustinian Angelo Rocca, which was the only truly public library in Counter-Reformation Rome; the Biblioteca Alessandrina with which Pope Alexander VII endowed the University of Rome; the Biblioteca Casanatense of the Cardinal Girolamo Casanate; and finally the Biblioteca Corsiniana founded by the bibliophile Clement XII Corsini and his nephew Cardinal Neri Corsini, still housed in Palazzo Corsini in via della Lungara. The Republic of Venice patronized the foundation of the Biblioteca Marciana, based on the library of Cardinal Basilios Bessarion. In Milan Cardinal Federico Borromeo founded the Biblioteca Ambrosiana.

This trend soon spread outside of Italy, for example Louis III, Elector Palatine founded the Bibliotheca Palatina of Heidelberg.

These libraries had fewer volumes than modern libraries; but they had many valuable manuscripts of Greek, Latin and Biblical works. After the invention of the printing press, many Renaissance libraries began to collect printed texts of useful information as well as historical manuscripts; this change occurred between about 1550 and 1650. This transition of collections during the Renaissance was not just a shift from manuscripts to printed texts, but also from books as expensive luxury aesthetic artifacts both in print and in manuscript form to an expenditure on multiple copies of printed texts which held valuable, practical information. One example is the library at the Ducal Palace in Urbino, Italy. For instance the Ducal Palace library of Urbino contains an older library with texts which mainly served to record the history of the Duke of Urbino's family and show his magnificence, and a newer library which was an information retrieval system for research and discussion by contemporary scholars. The ducal library also housed what we would consider as archival materials, such as Renaissance newsletter manuscripts, and diplomatic, engineering, military, and other political and moral documents.

Tianyi Chamber, founded in 1561 by Fan Qin during the Ming Dynasty, is the oldest existing library in China. In its heyday it boasted a collection of 70,000 volumes of antique books.

== Enlightenment era libraries ==
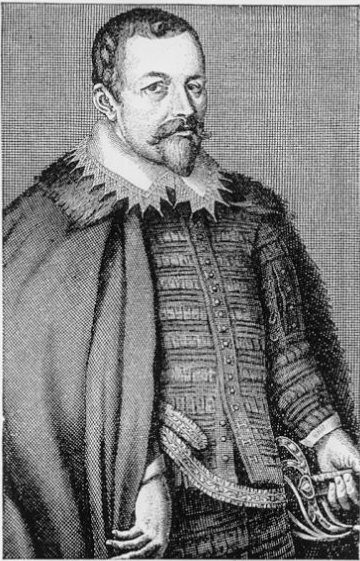
Thomas Bodley founded the Bodleian Library in 1602 as an early public library.

The 17th and 18th centuries include what is known as a golden age of libraries; during this some of the more important libraries were founded in Europe. Francis Trigge Chained Library of St. Wulfram's Church, Grantham, Lincolnshire was founded in 1598 by the rector of nearby Welbourne. This library is considered the "ancestor of public libraries" because patrons were not required to be members of a particular college or church to use the library. Trigge's library held over 350 books, and his inclusion of both Catholic and Protestant resources is considered unique for the time, since religious conflicts during the Reformation years were common.

Thomas Bodley founded the Bodleian Library, which was open to the "whole republic of the learned", Norwich City library was established in 1608 and the British Library was established in 1753. Chetham's Library in Manchester, which claims to be the oldest public library in the English-speaking world, opened in 1653. Other early town libraries of the UK include those of Ipswich (1612), Bristol (founded in 1613 and opened in 1615), and Leicester (1632). Shrewsbury School also opened its library to townsfolk.

A census of libraries in the eighteenth century was produced by Adalbert Blumenschein, a priest, which described libraries in hundreds of cities and towns from almost two dozen European countries or regions.

The Bibliothèque Mazarine was initially the personal library of cardinal Mazarin (1602–1661), who was a great bibliophile. His first library, arranged by his librarian, Gabriel Naudé, was dispersed when he had to flee Paris during the Fronde. He then began a second library with what was left of the first, assisted by the successor to Naudé, François de La Poterie. At his death he bequeathed his library, which he had opened to scholars since 1643, to the Collège des Quatre-Nations which he had founded in 1661. The Bibliothèque Sainte-Geneviève was also founded in Paris, the Austrian National Library in Vienna, the National Central Library in Florence, the Prussian State Library in Berlin, the Załuski Library in Warsaw and the M.E. Saltykov-Shchedrin State Public Library in St Petersburg.

This golden age brought accessibility and upgrades to European libraries. The Reformation inspired redistribution of wealth and knowledge. While the Thirty Years' War caused massive casualties, it also aided in the redistribution of this wealth and knowledge.

Often the plunder of this conflict included the recovery of books from looted monasteries and libraries. Given the large cost associated with the creation of the codex it should come as little surprise that books would be seen as a prize of both pecuniary and scholastic wealth, enough that a Bavarian noble named Maximilian I Duke of Bavaria sent the captured contents of the Palatine Library of Heidelberg to the Vatican as a trophy to the Pope Gregory XV. On the other side of the conflict, King Gustavus Adolphus of Sweden specifically targeted Jesuit schools and seminaries and had wagon loads of loot (seized books and manuscripts) returned to the libraries of his home. Large volumes of books changed hands during the Thirty Years' War and eventually found their way across Europe where new libraries sprang up to house these redistributed treasures.

In addition to stores of knowledge being shuffled around as spoils of war, the printing press created economies of scale that allowed for the exchange of books to become more commonplace. Book fairs were the most merchants most common choice of sale and catalogs were their most common choice of organization.

The collectors of this period helped shape the 'form' of libraries. We can see echoes of many of their innovations in the tropes of today's libraries. As noted previously, influenced by the ideals of Gabriel Naude, Cardinal Jules Mazarin proclaimed his library "open to everybody without exception". Also, possibly inspiring a trope, Sir Robert Bruce Cotton organized his library with the placement of busts of ancient Romans at the tops of his shelves, and cataloged his contents alphanumerically based on the name of the shelf (bust) and the book's physical position on the shelf (by number of books preceding it).

At the start of the 18th century, libraries were becoming increasingly public and were more frequently lending libraries. The 18th century saw the switch from closed parochial libraries to lending libraries. Before this time, public libraries were parochial in nature and libraries frequently chained their books to desks. Libraries also were not uniformly open to the public.

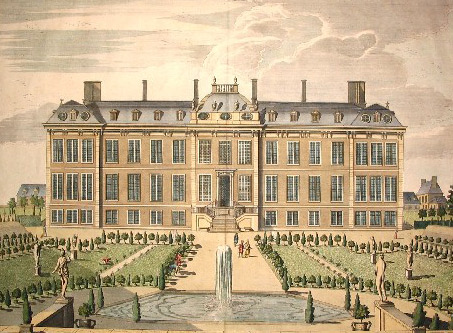
The British Museum was established in 1751 and had a library containing over 50,000 books.

Biblioteca Palafoxiana in Puebla City, Mexico, is recognized by UNESCO for being the first public library in the Americas. Founded in 1646 by Juan de Palafox y Mendoza

Even though the British Museum existed at this time and contained over 50,000 books, the national library was not open to the public, or even to a majority of the population. Access to the Museum depended on passes, of which there was sometimes a waiting period of three to four weeks. Moreover, the library was not open to browsing. Once a pass to the library had been issued, the reader was taken on a tour of it. Many readers complained that the tour was much too short.

Although most libraries followed this model of patron restriction, there were exceptions such as the Ducal Library at Wolfenbüttel, which was open every weekday morning and afternoon. The library had a diverse set of patrons of whom a large percentage were middle-class and non-academic users. Between 1714 and 1799, the library loaned 31,485 books, mostly fiction, to 1,648 patrons.

== Colonial British America ==
British America's first institutional library was founded by donations from a Puritan minister, John Harvard. Harvard left his collection of four hundred volumes and his estate to a small seminary now known as Harvard University located in Cambridge, Massachusetts. The collection of books helped the seminary find credibility and the library grew to be the largest in British America with 5,000 volumes in 1764. A fire struck later that year and the library was destroyed. The university worked to rebuild the library and the collection after the fire. The library benefited from the Loyalists fleeing Massachusetts after the American Revolutionary War in 1783 and many of the books left behind were donated to the collection The Harvard Library System now consists of several physical locations and has a combination of over 20 million items in the collection.

Benjamin Franklin helped to establish the first subscription library in Colonial British America. Franklin and many of his friends would meet on Fridays to discuss politics, science, and philosophy. The friends soon established a club and called themselves Junto. The members started sharing and exchanging books with one another. The idea arose and Franklin proposed that the meetings should be in one place where all of their collective books could be housed. In 1731, fifty members contributed money to establish the Library Company of Philadelphia. Members paid an initial fee and then annual dues. The idea of a subscription library was popular and dozens of libraries were established across the colonies. After the American Revolutionary War, the Library Company served members of the United States Congress until the capital of the United States of America was moved to Washington D.C. in 1800. The current Library Company of Philadelphia is now a research library with a non-circulating collection that is open to the public.

=== Subscription libraries ===
At the start of the 19th century, there were virtually no public libraries in the sense in which we now understand the term i.e. libraries provided from public funds and freely accessible to all. Only one important library in Britain, namely Chetham's Library in Manchester, was fully and freely accessible to the public. However, there had come into being a whole network of library provision on a private or institutional basis.

The increase in secular literature at this time encouraged the spread of lending libraries, especially the commercial subscription libraries. Many small, private book clubs evolved into subscription libraries, charging high annual fees or requiring subscribing members to purchase shares in the libraries. The materials available to subscribers tended to focus on particular subject areas, such as biography, history, philosophy, theology, and travel, rather than works of fiction, particularly the novel.

Unlike a public library, access was often restricted to members. Some of the earliest such institutions were founded in late 17th-century England, such as Chetham's Library in 1653, Innerpeffray Library in 1680 and Thomas Plume's Library in 1704. In the American colonies, the Library Company of Philadelphia was started in 1731 by Benjamin Franklin in Philadelphia, Pennsylvania. Franklin's Junto and subscription library gained popularity across the colonies and, "by the 1750s, a dozen more subscription libraries had appeared, established in Pennsylvania, Rhode Island, South Carolina, Massachusetts, New York, Connecticut, and Maine."

Parochial libraries attached to Anglican parishes or Nonconformist chapels in Britain emerged in the early 18th century, and prepared the way for local public libraries.

The increasing production and demand for fiction promoted by commercial markets led to the rise of circulating libraries, which met a need that subscription libraries did not fulfil. William Bathoe claimed that his commercial venture was 'the Original Circulating library', opening doors at two locations in London in 1737. Circulating libraries also charged subscription fees to users and offered serious subject matter as well as the popular novels, thus the difficulty in clearly distinguishing circulating from subscription libraries.

Subscription libraries were democratic in nature; created by and for communities of local subscribers who aimed to establish permanent collections of books and reading materials, rather than selling their collections annually as the circulating libraries tended to do, in order to raise funds to support their other commercial interests. Even though the subscription libraries were often founded by reading societies, committees, elected by the subscribers, chose books for the collection that were general, rather than aimed at a particular religious, political or professional group. The books selected for the collection were chosen because they would be mutually beneficial to the shareholders. The committee also selected the librarians who would manage the circulation of materials.

In Britain there were more than 200 commercial circulating libraries open in 1800, more than twice the number of subscription and private proprietary libraries that were operating at the same time. Many proprietors pandered to the most fashionable clientele, making much ado about the sort of shop they offered, the lush interiors, plenty of room and long hours of service. "These 'libraries' would be called rental collections today."

=== Private libraries ===
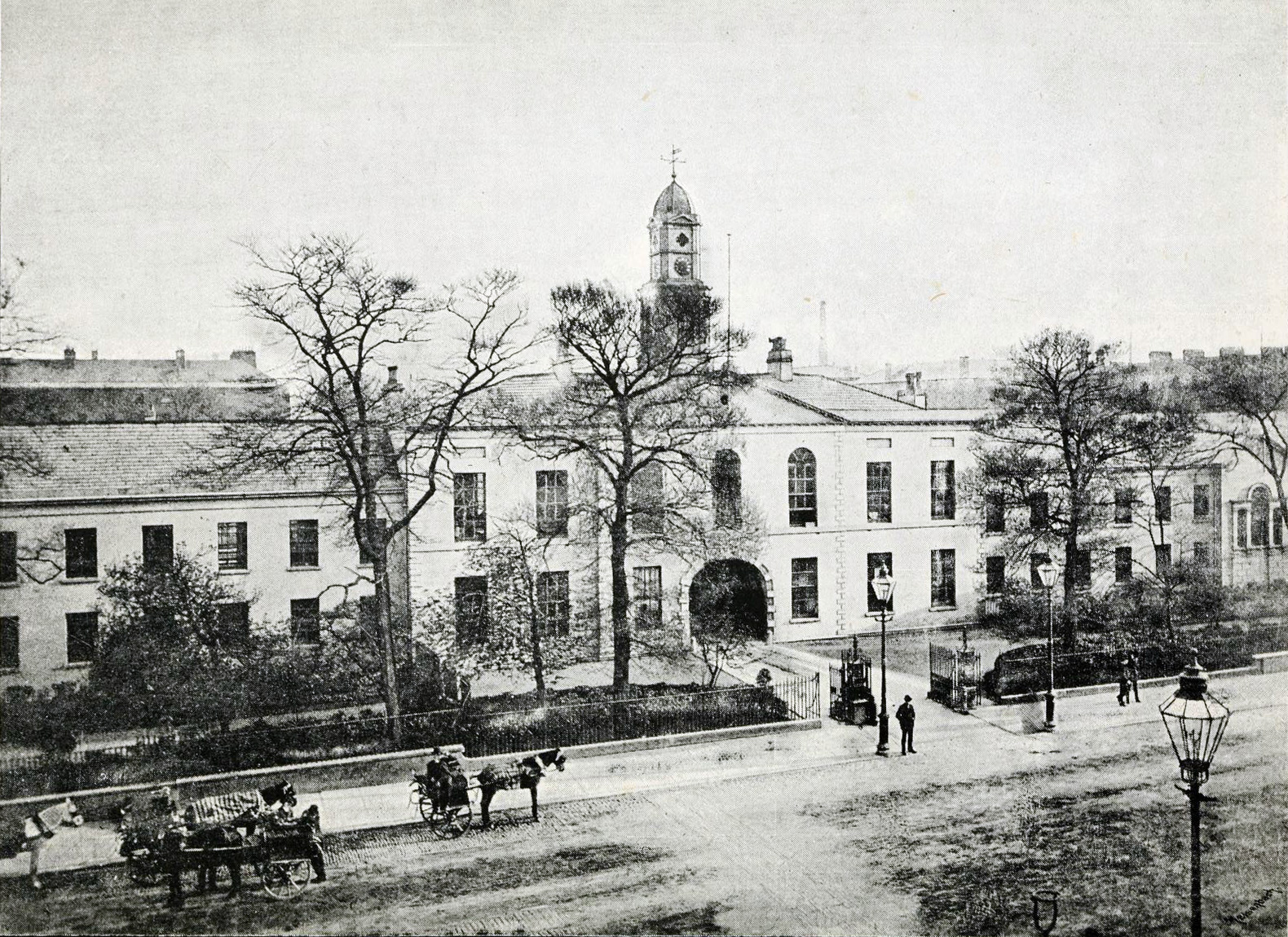
The Linen Hall Library was an 18th-century subscription library. Pictured in 1888, shortly before its demolition.

Private subscription libraries functioned much like commercial subscription libraries, with some variations. One of the most popular versions of the private subscription library was the gentlemen only library. Membership was restricted to the proprietors or shareholders, and ranged from a dozen or two to between four and five hundred.

The Liverpool Subscription library was a gentlemen only library. In 1798, it was renamed the Athenaeum when it was rebuilt with a newsroom and coffeehouse. It had an entrance fee of one guinea and an annual subscription of five shillings. An analysis of the registers for the first twelve years provides glimpses of middle-class reading habits in a mercantile community at this period. The largest and most popular sections of the library were history, antiquities, and geography, with 283 titles and 6,121 borrowings, and belles-lettres, with 238 titles and 3,313 borrowings.

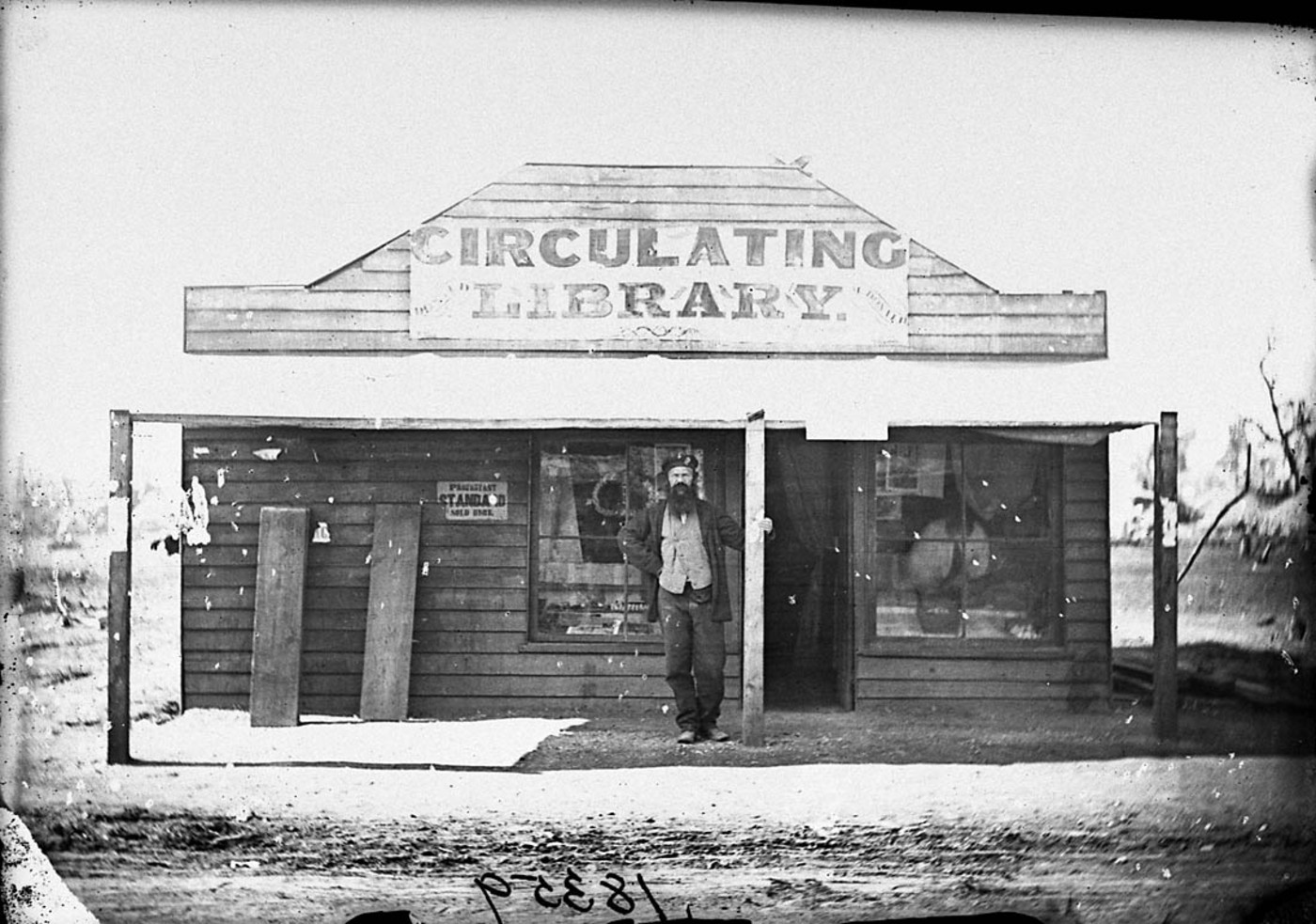
Circulating library and stationery shop, Gulgong, Australia 1870

Private subscription libraries held a greater amount of control over both membership and the types of books in the library. Cheap fiction was virtually absent. Subscription libraries prided themselves on respectability. The highest percentage of subscribers were often landed proprietors, gentry, and the old professions.

Towards the end of the 18th century and in the first decades of the 19th century the need for books and general education made itself felt among social classes created by the beginnings of the Industrial Revolution. The late 18th century saw a rise in subscription libraries intended for the use of tradesmen. In 1797, there was established at Kendal the Economical Library, "designed principally for the use and instruction of the working classes". There was also the Artizans' library established at Birmingham in 1799. The entrance fee was 3 shillings. The subscription was 1 shilling 6 pence per quarter. This was a library of general literature. Novels, at first excluded, were afterwards admitted on condition that they did not account for more than one-tenth of the annual income.

Benjamin Franklin led the founding of the first American subscription library. In Philadelphia, Franklin formed "a club of mutual improvements" calling themselves the "Junto", which meant a council or a combination of individuals organized for a specific purpose. Because the men in this club had a steady income, they could afford to be a part of this club and to purchase books. Only some had enough to be considered a library; together they shared what they all had.

== National libraries ==
=== Origins ===
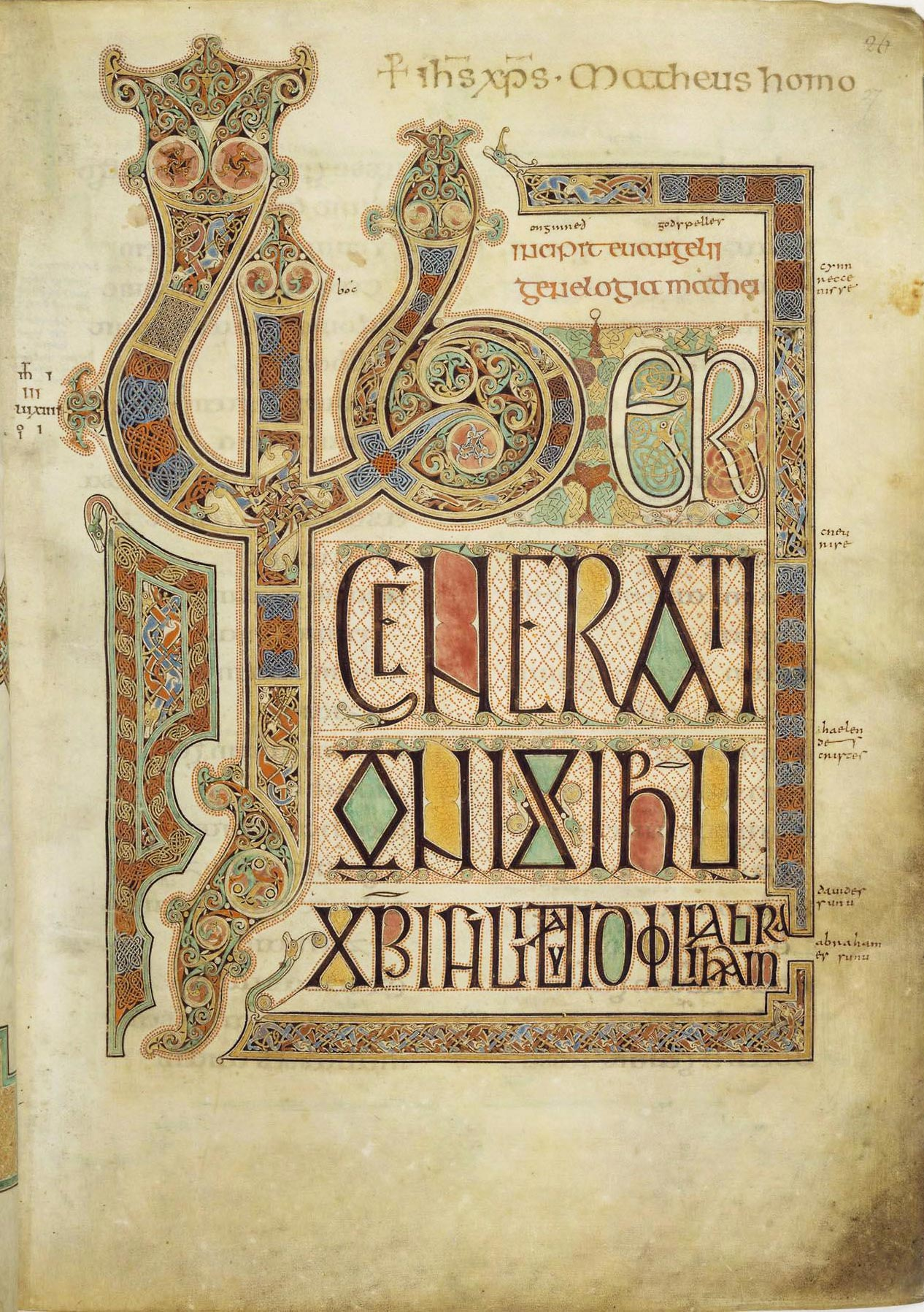
The Lindisfarne Gospels, collected by Sir Robert Cotton.

The first national libraries had their origins in the royal collections of the sovereign or some other supreme body of the state. This era is termed the "golden age of libraries", as libraries became national symbols of pride.

One of the first plans for a national library was devised by the Welsh mathematician John Dee, who in 1556 presented Mary I of England with a visionary plan for the preservation of old books, manuscripts and records and the founding of a national library, but his proposal was not taken up.

In England, Sir Richard Bentley's Proposal for Building a Royal Library published in 1694 stimulated renewed interest in the subject. Sir Robert Cotton, 1st Baronet, of Connington, a wealthy antiquarian, amassed the richest private collection of manuscripts in the world at the time and founded the Cotton Library. After the Dissolution of the Monasteries, many priceless and ancient manuscripts that had belonged to the monastic libraries began to be disseminated among various owners, many of whom were unaware of the cultural value of the manuscripts. Sir Robert's genius was in finding, purchasing and preserving these ancient documents. After his death his grandson donated the library to the nation as its first national library. This transfer established the formation of the British Library.

=== National libraries ===
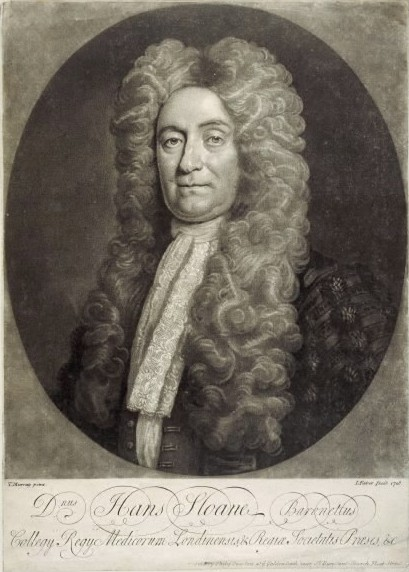
Sir Hans Sloane's collection of books and manuscripts was bequeathed to the British Museum.

The first true national library was founded in 1753 as part of the British Museum. This new institution was the first of a new kind of museum – national, belonging to neither church nor king, freely open to the public and aiming to collect everything. The museum's foundations lay in the will of the physician and naturalist Sir Hans Sloane, who gathered an enviable collection of curiosities over his lifetime which he bequeathed to the nation for £20,000.

Sloane's collection included some 40,000 printed books and 7,000 manuscripts, as well as prints and drawings. The British Museum Act 1753 also incorporated the Cotton library and the Harleian library. These were joined in 1757 by the Royal Library, assembled by various British monarchs.

The first exhibition galleries and reading room for scholars opened on 15 January 1759, and in 1757, King George II granted it the right to a copy of every book published in the country, thereby ensuring that the Museum's library would expand indefinitely.

Anthony Panizzi became the Principal Librarian at the British Library in 1856, where he oversaw its modernization, obtaining a significant appropriation from Parliament. During his tenure, the library's holdings increased from 235,000 to 540,000 volumes, making it the largest library in the world at the time. Its famous circular Reading Room was opened in 1857. Panizzi undertook the creation of a new book catalogue, based on his "Ninety-One Cataloguing Rules" (1841). These rules informed subsequent catalogue rules of the 19th and 20th centuries.

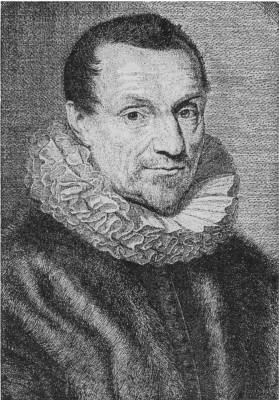
As librarian of the Bibliothèque Mazarine, Jacques Auguste de Thou transformed it into the largest library in the world at the time.

In France, the first national library was the Bibliothèque Mazarine, which evolved from its origin as a royal library founded at the Louvre Palace by Charles V in 1368. At the death of Charles VI, this first collection was unilaterally bought by the English regent of France, the Duke of Bedford, who transferred it to England in 1424. It was apparently dispersed at his death in 1435. The invention of printing resulted in the starting of another collection in the Louvre inherited by Louis XI in 1461. Francis I transferred the collection in 1534 to Fontainebleau and merged it with his private library.

The appointment of Jacques Auguste de Thou as librarian in the 17th century initiated a period of development that made it the largest and richest collection of books in the world. The library opened to the public in 1692, under the administration of Abbé Louvois, Minister Louvois's son. Abbé Louvois was succeeded by the Abbé Bignon, or Bignon II as he was termed, who instituted a complete reform of the library's system. Catalogues were made which appeared from 1739 to 1753 in 11 volumes. The collections increased steadily by purchase and gift to the outbreak of the French Revolution, at which time it was in grave danger of partial or total destruction, but owing to the activities of Antoine-Augustin Renouard and Joseph Van Praet it suffered no injury.

The library's collections swelled to over 300,000 volumes during the radical phase of the French Revolution when the private libraries of aristocrats and clergy were seized. After the establishment of the French First Republic in September 1792, "the Assembly declared the Bibliotheque du Roi to be national property and the institution was renamed the Bibliothèque Nationale. After four centuries of control by the Crown, this great library now became the property of the French people."

==== Expansion ====
In the newly formed United States, James Madison first proposed instituting a congressional library in 1783. The Library of Congress was established on 24 April 1800, when President John Adams signed an act of Congress providing for the transfer of the seat of government from Philadelphia to the new capital city of Washington. Part of the legislation appropriated $5,000 "for the purchase of such books as may be necessary for the use of Congress ..., and for fitting up a suitable apartment for containing them...." Books were ordered from London and the collection, consisting of 740 books and 3 maps, was housed in the new Capitol. In 1814, the majority of this first iteration of the Library of Congress burned as British troops sacked Washington D.C. Soon after, Thomas Jefferson pushed Congress to accept his personal library to replace what was lost. Within a year, the majority of his library had been purchased by Congress, doubling the number of books in the previous collection and greatly expanding its range of subjects. Jefferson's library formed the core of what would become the modern Library of Congress.

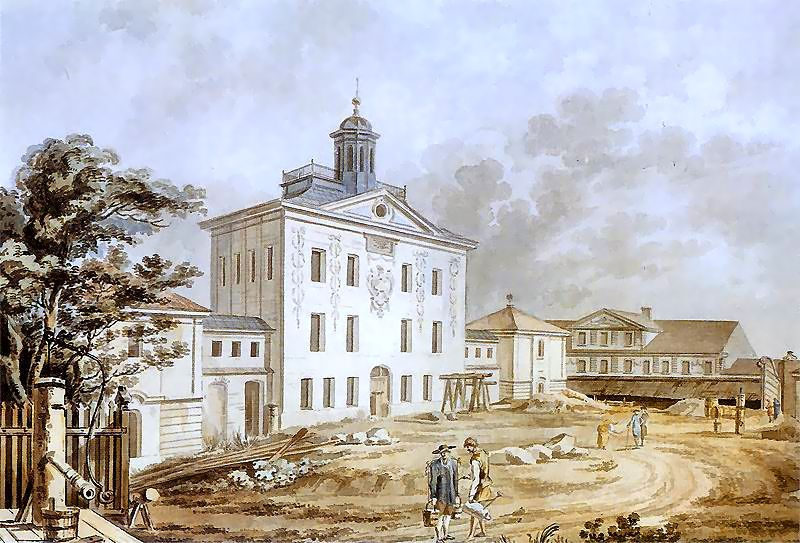
Załuski Library of Poland was taken by Russia after the country's partition, and the collection formed the nucleus of the Russian Imperial Public Library, established in 1795.

The Imperial Public Library of Russia was established in 1795 by Catherine the Great, whose private collections included the domestic libraries of Voltaire and Diderot, which she had purchased from their heirs. Voltaire's personal library is still one of the highlights of the collection. The plan of a Russian public library was submitted to Catherine in 1766 but the Empress did not approve the project for the imperial library until 27 May [O.S. 16 May] 1795, eighteen months before her death. The cornerstone of the foreign-language department came from the Polish–Lithuanian Commonwealth in the form of Załuski's Library (420,000 volumes), nationalized by the Russian government at the time of the partitions. The Polish-language books from the library (numbering some 55,000 titles) were returned to Poland by the Russian SFSR in 1921.

Although Germany was only united as a state in 1871, the first national library was set up in the context of the German revolutions of 1848. Various booksellers and publishers offered their works to the Frankfurt Parliament for a parliamentary library. The library, led by Johann Heinrich Plath, was termed the Reichsbibliothek ("Reich library"). After the failure of the revolution the library was abandoned and the stock of books already in existence was stored at the Germanisches Nationalmuseum in Nuremberg. In 1912, the town of Leipzig, seat of the annual Leipzig Book Fair, the Kingdom of Saxony and the Börsenverein der Deutschen Buchhändler (Association of German booksellers) agreed to found a German National Library in Leipzig. Starting 1 January 1913, all publications in German were systematically collected (including books from Austria and Switzerland).

== Modern public libraries ==
=== Canada ===
Personal collections were brought to Canada by early French settlers of the sixteenth century. In Quebec City in 1635 the Jesuit College was established. In 1882 the province of Ontario passed free public library legislation.

=== United Kingdom ===
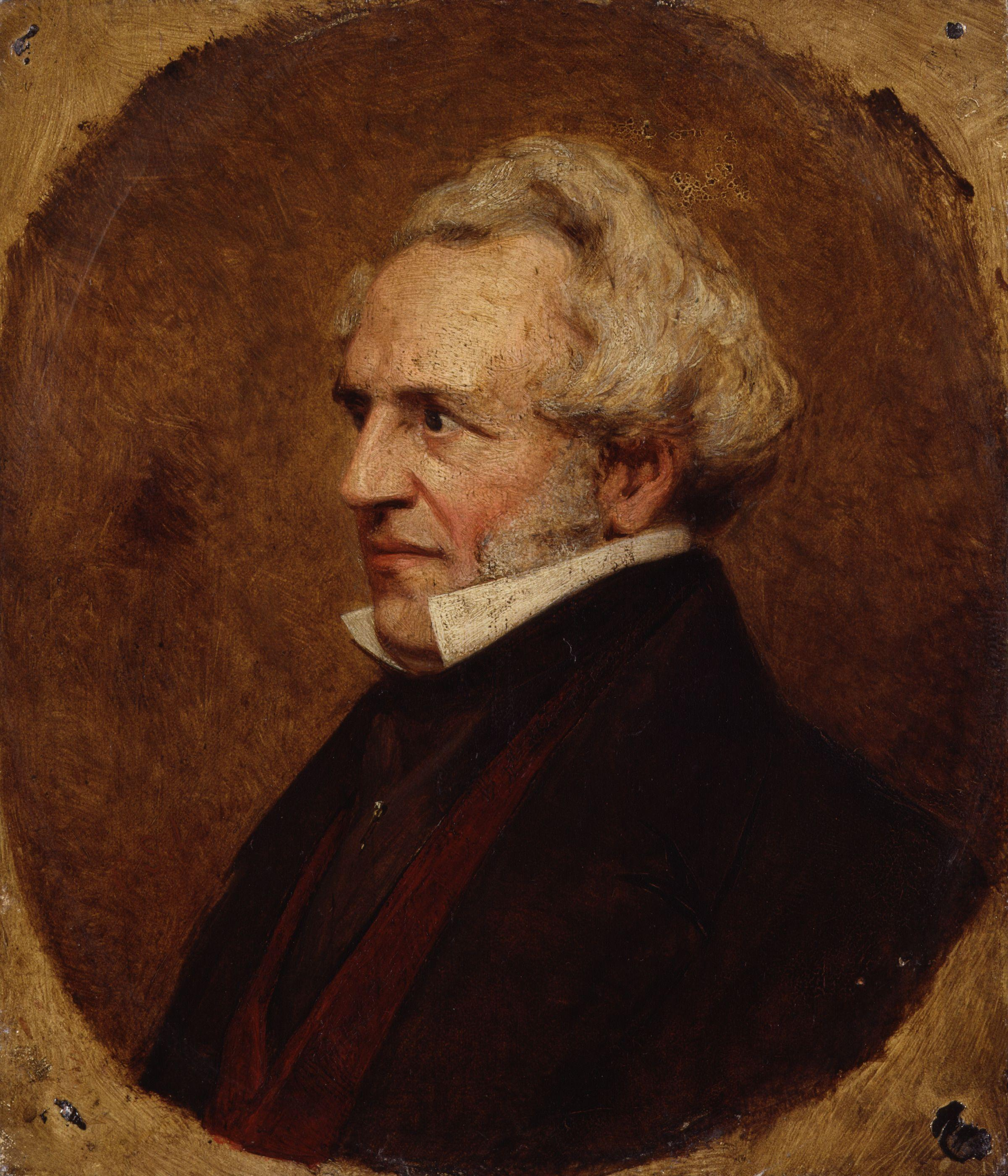
James Silk Buckingham led the campaign for public libraries in the mid-19th century.

Although by the mid-19th century England could claim 274 subscription libraries and Scotland, 266, the foundation of the modern public library system in Britain is the Public Libraries Act 1850. The act first gave local boroughs the power to establish free public libraries and was the first legislative step toward the creation of an enduring national institution that provides universal free access to information and literature. In the 1830s, at the height of the Chartist movement, there was a general tendency towards reformism in the United Kingdom. The Capitalist economic model had created a significant amount of free time for workers, and the middle classes were concerned that the workers' free time was not being well-spent. This was prompted more by Victorian middle class paternalism rather than by demand from the lower social orders. Campaigners felt that encouraging the lower classes to spend their free time on morally uplifting activities, such as reading, would promote greater social good.

In 1835, and against government opposition, James Silk Buckingham, MP for Sheffield and a supporter of the temperance movement, was able to secure the chair of the select committee which would examine "the extent, causes, and consequences of the prevailing vice of intoxication among the labouring classes of the United Kingdom" and propose solutions. Francis Place, a campaigner for the working class, agreed that "the establishment of parish libraries and district reading rooms, and popular lectures on subjects both entertaining and instructive to the community might draw off a number of those who now frequent public houses for the sole enjoyment they afford". Buckingham introduced to Parliament a Public Institution Bill allowing boroughs to charge a tax to set up libraries and museums, the first of its kind. Although this did not become law, it had a major influence on William Ewart MP and Joseph Brotherton MP, who introduced a bill which would "[empower] boroughs with a population of 10,000 or more to raise a ½d for the establishment of museums". This became the Museums Act 1845.

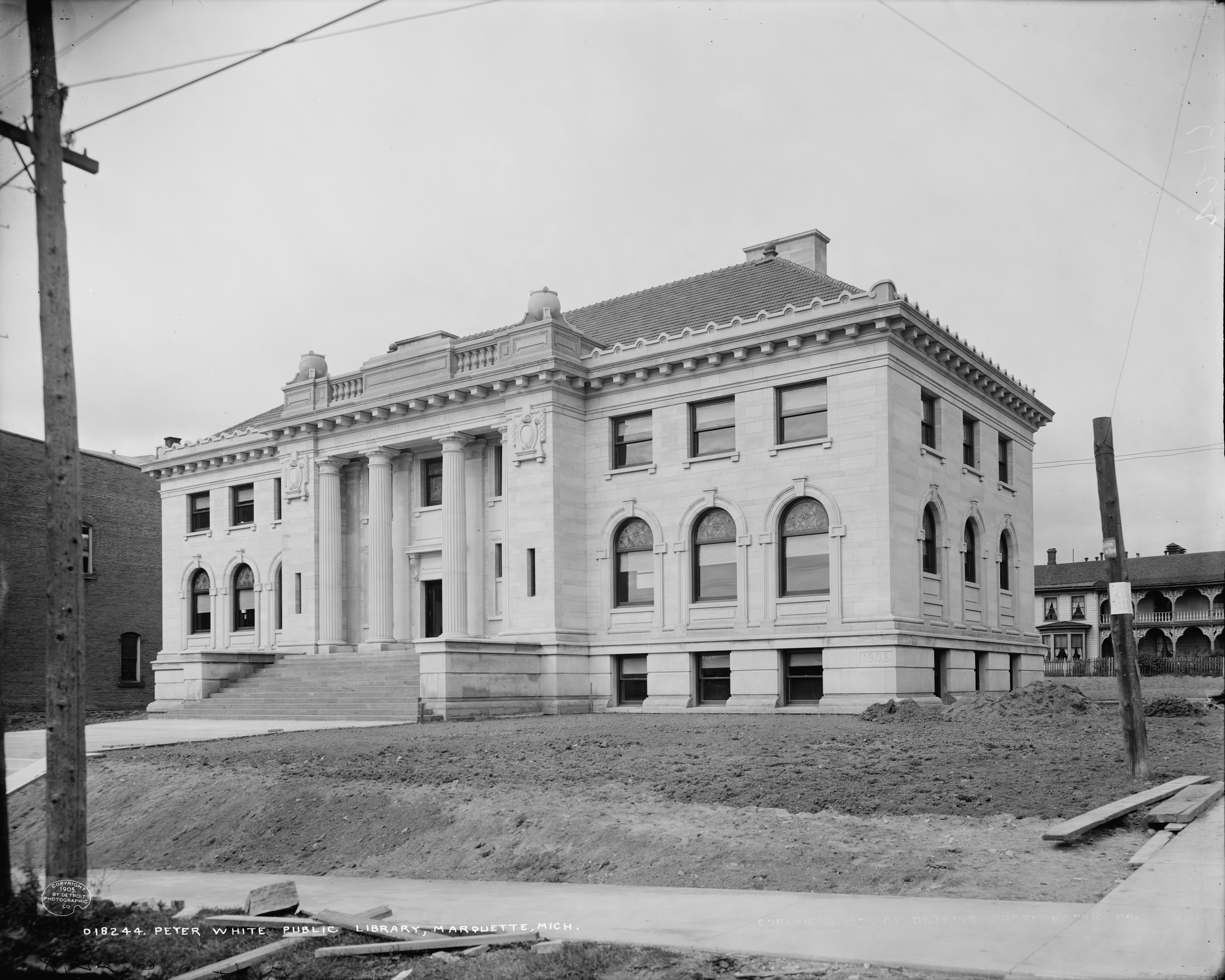
The turn of the 20th century witnessed a tremendous expansion in the provision of public libraries in the English-speaking world. Pictured, the Peter White Public Library, built in 1905.

The advocacy of Ewart and Brotherton then succeeded in having a select committee set up to consider public library provision. The report argued that the provision of public libraries would steer people towards temperate and moderate habits. With a view to maximising the potential of current facilities, the committee made two significant recommendations. They suggested that the government should issue grants to aid the foundation of libraries and that the Museums Act 1845 should be amended and extended to allow for a tax to be levied for the establishment of public libraries. The bill passed through Parliament as most MPs felt that public libraries would provide facilities for self-improvement through books and reading for all classes, and that the greater levels of education attained by providing public libraries would result in lower crime rates.

The earliest example in England of a library to be endowed for the benefit of users who were not members of an institution such as a cathedral or college was the Francis Trigge Chained Library in Grantham, Lincolnshire, established in 1598. The library still exists and can justifiably claim to be the forerunner of later public library systems. The Chetham's Library in Manchester, England was founded in 1653.

The beginning of the modern, free, open access libraries really got its start in the UK in 1847. Parliament appointed a committee, led by William Ewart, on public libraries. It was asked to consider the necessity of establishing libraries through the nation. They reported back in 1849, noting the poor condition of library service, it recommended the establishment of free public libraries all over the country, and it led to the Public Libraries Act 1850, which allowed all cities with populations exceeding 10,000 to levy taxes for the support of public libraries.

Salford Museum and Art Gallery first opened in November 1850 as "The Royal Museum & Public Library", as the first unconditionally free public library in England. The library in Campfield, Manchester was the first library to operate a free lending library without subscription in 1852. Norwich lays claims to being the first municipality to adopt the Public Libraries Act 1850 (which allowed any municipal borough with a population of 100,000 or more to introduce a halfpenny rate to establish public libraries – although not to buy books). Norwich was the eleventh library to open, in 1857, after Winchester, Manchester, Liverpool, Bolton, Kidderminster, Cambridge, Birkenhead and Sheffield.

Another important act was the Elementary Education Act 1870, which increased literacy and thereby the demand for libraries. By 1877, more than 75 cities had established free libraries, and by 1900 the number had reached 300. This finally marks the start of the public library as we know it. And these acts influenced similar laws in other countries, such as the US.

But World War II brought nightly bombing raids from the German air force, and libraries in England suffered. While libraries in London had mostly made provisions for evacuating their irreplaceable stock, libraries in smaller towns and cities were also under threat from the German Luftwaffe, especially cities such as Coventry and Plymouth. Valuable holdings in towns with a larger library system distributed their irreplaceable resources to branch libraries. Some libraries photographed resources and then sent the negatives to a country town. Others made microfilms.

Some libraries lost entire collections from the German bombs. Both Coventry and Plymouth lost most, if not all, of their holdings. At Coventry, many important manuscripts were lost, including the account books of many of the cities medieval trading guilds such as the Drapers' Company (1523–1764) and the Tanners' Company (1605-early 1800s). Also lost at Coventry were the complete files of the local newspapers. At Plymouth, after eight hours of bombing, nothing remained.

Librarians working at the Liverpool Central Library had placed their books in the building's basement while awaiting the books' evacuation to a more rural part of the country. But in May 1941, the library suffered a devastating bomb attack that destroyed many of the holdings, including the master catalog and other bibliographic tools.

=== United States ===
In the early decades after the formation of the United States, there were a growing number of community subscription libraries, along with mercantile and athenaeum libraries. The mercantile libraries were intended for members of trade groups and employees working in various industries. Athenaeums were typically formed by social or intellectual associations as combinations of libraries, art galleries, museums, music halls, and cultural event centers. The Boston Athenaeum, Athenaeum of Philadelphia, Portsmouth Athenaeum in New Hampshire, and the Salem Athenaeum in Massachusetts were all started before 1815. The Redwood Library and Athenaeum boasts its origins as far back as 1747.

The identity of the evolving American culture incorporated a strong belief that independent thought, democratic government, and religious morality relied heavily on access to information, and the ability to read. It's not surprising then, that as the population grew and expanded into its enlarging territory, libraries followed. For the same reasons, public education was beginning to grow in this era as well, further driving the need for available collections of books in communities – either in school rooms, or available to the entire community. The American School Library was a 50 book set covering the breadth of topics considered essential for a basic education . It was published by Harper & Brothers in 1839 on behalf of the American Society for the Diffusion of Useful Knowledge, and mandated by the State of New York to be purchased by every school district in the state.

The first wholly tax-supported public library in the United States was Peterborough, New Hampshire (1833). It was first funded by a Town Meeting supported by state funds from the State Literary Fund, which was originally collected from taxes for the State University, but it was not adequate enough to fund the university, so the money was reallocated for the library then later by an "Act Providing for the Establishment of Public Libraries" in 1849. The Peterborough Town Library was proposed by Reverend Abiel Abbot as a central collection of books that would be owned by the people and be free to all of the town's inhabitants. The original collection was bought by Reverend Abbot and the library trustees and was housed in Smith & Thompson's general store, which also acted as a post office. The New Hampshire State Legislature was encouraged by the innovation of Abbot and in 1849 became "the first state to pass a law authorizing towns to raise money to establish and maintain their own libraries". By 1890 the library had outgrown its space and a new building was constructed. This building has been expanded twice since then to accommodate the growing collection. According to the Peterborough Town Library website, "its importance rests in its being created on the principle, accepted at Town Meeting, that the public library, like the public school, was deserving of maintenance by public taxation and should be owned and managed by the people of the community".

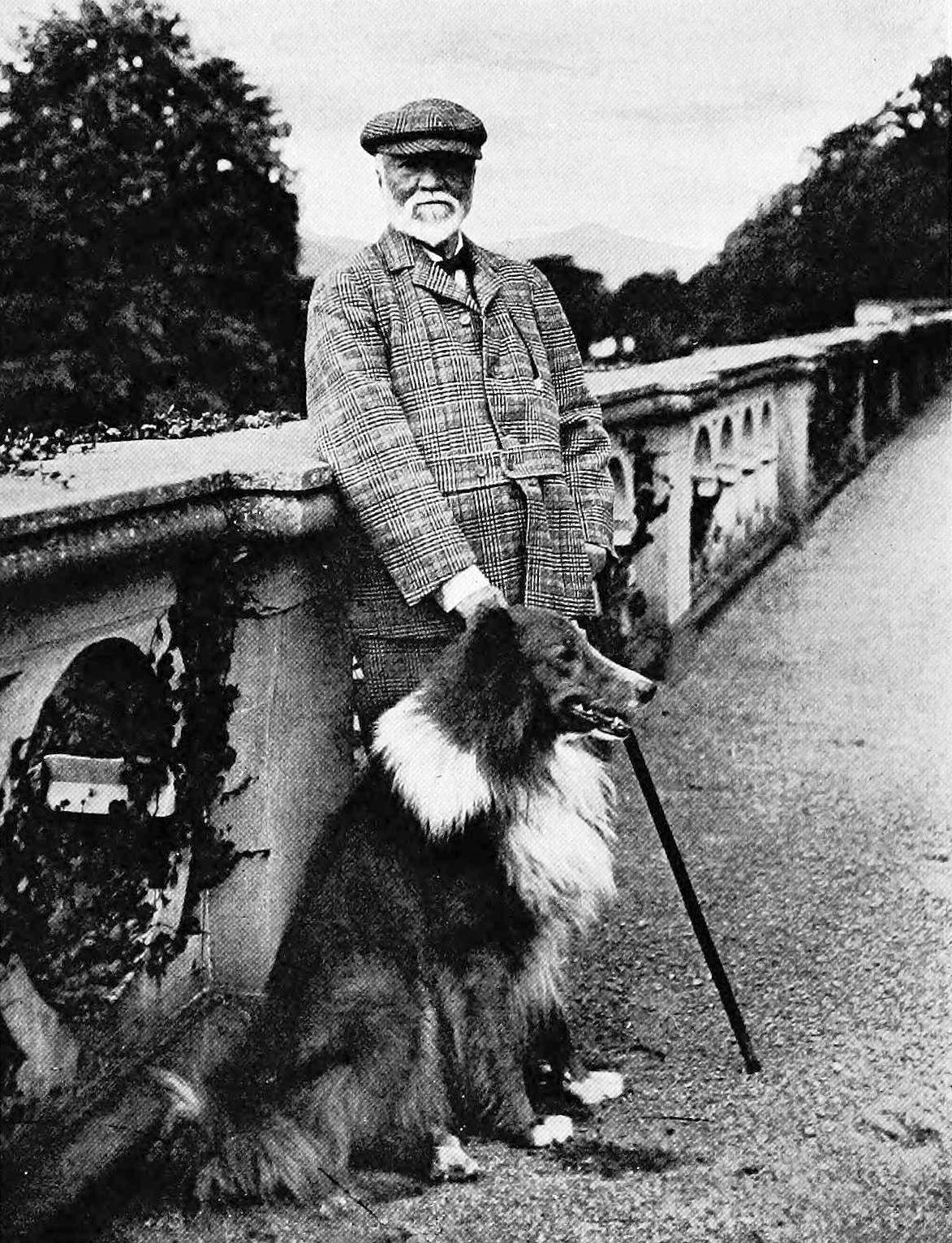
Andrew Carnegie played an important role in financing public libraries across the English-speaking world.

The year 1876 is key in the history of librarianship in the United States. The American Library Association was formed on October 6, The American Library Journal was founded, Melvil Dewey published his decimal-based system of classification, and the United States Bureau of Education published its report, "Public libraries in the United States of America; their history, condition, and management." During the post-Civil War years, there was a rise in the establishment of public libraries, a movement led chiefly by newly formed women's clubs. They contributed their own collections of books, conducted lengthy fund raising campaigns for buildings, and lobbied within their communities for financial support for libraries, as well as with legislatures and the Carnegie Library Endowment founded in the 20th century. They led the establishment of 75–80 percent of the libraries in communities across the country.

Philanthropists and businessmen, including John Passmore Edwards, Henry Tate and Andrew Carnegie, helped to increase the number of public libraries from the late 19th century. Carnegie, who made his fortune largely in steel production and construction, devoted a great deal of his fortune to philanthropy. Carnegie alone built over 2000 libraries in the US, 660 Carnegie Libraries in Britain, in addition to many more in the Commonwealth. Carnegie also funded academic libraries, favoring small schools and schools with African American students. "In 1899, Pennsylvania State College became the first college to receive Carnegie funding ($150,000) and their library was constructed in 1903." By the end of this life, he had given away $300 million, or 90 percent of his wealth. Carnegie listed universities, libraries, medical centers, public parks, meeting and concert halls, public baths, and churches as seven areas of particular importance for philanthropic endeavors. Carnegie did not assume full responsibility for the construction of new libraries and library branches; rather, he stipulated that communities provide sites for libraries, and governments commit to providing salaries for staff and maintaining the libraries. Additionally, Carnegie libraries could not rely solely on private funds, but required public funds as well. This ensured that the libraries would be a part of the community and continue to receive funding after the initial donation. In total, Carnegie donated $40 million to the construction of 1,670 public library buildings in the United States. Additionally, Carnegie funded construction for more than 100 academic libraries in the United States.

In 1997, Bill and Melinda Gates worked on their first major philanthropic venture, called the U.S. Library Program. The program provided grants to "more than 5,800 libraries in the United States, installed more than 25,000 PCs and trained 7,000 librarians." By providing grants the U.S. Library Program has "increased public access to computer, the Internet and digital information to library patrons in low-income communities".

==== Segregation in libraries ====
Public libraries were amongst the public places in the southern United States that followed the Jim Crow laws, and segregated services for white and non-white patrons, sometimes barring black individuals from entering.

The desegregation of libraries during the civil rights movement represented a "time of crisis for librarianship", in which civilians and library staff had to contend with many forms of racism and resistance to social change. As a "product of the society within which they exist", desegregation looked vastly different between libraries in the North and South. In the North library development was encouraged by a general mindset in favor of education and reading, as well as the economic means to fund library development. In the South, many industries believed maintaining a low literacy rate would ensure that there was a large supply of inexpensive and unskilled labor, especially among black laborers. Libraries in the South were often segregated with a heavy hand, with some library administrators intent on keeping exclusion mutual by restricting white people from accessing libraries created for black people. Whether libraries for black people even existed was often a result of fundraising efforts among black citizens, although white library administrators in power were quick to take praise for the size of their "black libraries". The amount of funds provided to libraries also disproportionately left black citizens at a disadvantage. In one instance, the Booker T. Washington branch in Birmingham received 8% of the library's budget, even though people who were black made up 40% of the population.

==== African American libraries and literary societies ====
The history of African Americans and libraries in the United States is one with a rich heritage. The earliest established library started by and for African Americans in the US was the Philadelphia Library Company of Colored Persons. By 1838, its collection included 600 volumes, as well as pamphlets and maps. Members could read independently or follow a scheduled course of study.

The nineteenth century was a fruitful time for African American literary societies. As well as a creating space for a black literary tradition, these societies provided libraries to their members, often through subscriptions. They were an important beginning in library access for African Americans in the United States when they were excluded from larger white literary societies. African American literary societies included the Bethel Literary and Historical Society, Philadelphia Library Company of Colored Persons already mentioned. Additional societies that held an important role in library history included the Banneker Institute of the City of Philadelphia which began in 1854 and, within three years, had a library that compared to that of the Philadelphia Library Company of Colored Persons, which in 1841 recorded a collection of almost 600 books. There were also literary societies created specifically by and for black women such as the Female Literary Association which started in Philadelphia in 1831 and included the role of a librarian in its constitution, who would "have charge of all books belonging to the Association, and after each meeting, take care that they be placed in the Library." Much of the literature focuses on Philadelphia seemingly due to the many literary societies found there and the documentation that has been preserved about them, but there were many throughout the country. The Phoenix Society was one such society, which began in New York in 1833 with one of the founding goals being to "establish circulating libraries . . . for the use of people of colour on very moderate pay"; within eight months of their inception—by December 1833—they had succeeded in opening a library and reading room.

The philanthropy of Andrew Carnegie had a tremendous impact upon the ability of "Colored Library Associations" being able to gain access to funding in order to build libraries in and for their communities. In the south, "African Americans living in such cities as Charlotte, North Carolina, and Houston even had access to black public libraries that had independent governance." The first public library for African Americans in the South funded by the Carnegie Corporation was the Western Colored Branch in Louisville, Kentucky in 1908. Several years later, in 1914, spearheaded by the renowned black educator Albert Mayzeek, the Eastern Colored Branch opened in a Carnegie financed facility. In Houston, a library was established inside a school in 1909, then later it was relocated to a new building in 1913 with the help of Carnegie Corporation Funds. Thanks to the support of Carnegie and his corporation, many cities were able to construct and maintain African American libraries.

William E. B. Du Bois also attributed the movement for Negro libraries to the "natural desire (of the race) for books".

Another funder for building libraries, especially in African American communities in the South, was the Works Progress Administration (WPA). The WPA was part of the "New Deal" created by President Franklin D. Roosevelt and his administration. The "New Deal" was meant to boost and invest in the American economy and infrastructure that was devastated by the Great Depression. Services and access to funds was to be distributed to all areas, but especially regions hit the hardest, such as the South. The South had been devastated by the Great Depression and racial divisions exacerbated the economic conditions. With nearly two-thirds of the population in the South being African Americans it was imperative that everyone have access to resources afforded through the WPA. In 1935, the WPA created the library demonstration project. The project was created to encourage the development of libraries in underserved areas and to boost employment. With the help of WPA, African Americans were afforded more access to libraries and employment. For instance, in 1933 South Carolina had fifty-six public libraries and only four provided services to the African American community. Even with private libraries filled with donations, only 15 percent of the African American community in South Carolina had access to library services and materials. By 1937, the WPA had established a bookmobile for the African American Community in South Carolina. By 1939, WPA funded twenty-nine segregated libraries, the majority of which employed members of the African American community. Though it is undetermined how many libraries were built to serve African American communities through the WPA, the WPA built and renovated at least 1,000 libraries. These numbers do not include the funding, services and assistance the program provided to existing libraries.

==== State library commissions, 1870s–1930s ====
State library commissions played a central role in the expansion and professionalization of public libraries in the United States during the late nineteenth and early twentieth centuries. Following the 1876 Special Report on Public Libraries, reformers argued that state‑level oversight was necessary to support small and rural communities where library service was inconsistent or nonexistent. Massachusetts established the first state library commission in 1890, and by 1918, forty states had created similar bodies. These commissions provided traveling libraries, trustee training, and advisory services, and they promoted uniform standards for cataloging, classification, and building design.

Commissions were especially influential in the Midwest and South, where they helped towns secure Carnegie grants by assisting with applications, architectural planning, and long‑term funding commitments. They also encouraged the adoption of the Dewey Decimal Classification and supported the growth of library education through certification programs and summer training schools. Historians note that commissions acted as early agents of standardization, shaping expectations for children’s services, outreach, and professional norms. Their influence declined after the 1930s as state library agencies absorbed their responsibilities, but their legacy remains.

==== Disaster recovery ====
The US Federal Emergency Management Agency (FEMA) recognizes libraries as an invaluable community service and has added libraries to the list of essential services eligible for emergency funding after a disaster. With this funding, libraries can restore services faster in order to provide internet access, air conditioned spaces, electricity for charging electronic devices, and access to running water.

=== South Africa ===
Beginning in 1910, South Africa's public libraries grew in importance to the country's English settlers. During World War I, South Africa had a total of seventy-one subscription libraries, all governed by the English government. Afrikaners had fewer libraries at the time, only seven.

In 1928, two librarians were appointed by the Carnegie Corporation in New York to survey library resources in South Africa. Their top two concerns were the lack of library use by Afrikaners and creating library provisions and school library services for non-Whites, with the recommendation that they not share the same buildings as White patrons.

During the apartheid years (1948–1994), progressive libraries such as the Durban Library, opened branches in Indian and Colored communities, despite government pressure to not do so. The years of apartheid began with the Natal Indian Congress, founded by Gandhi, which called upon the Durban City Council to end the restriction of non-Europeans by opening the library to all sections of the community. The pressure put on the city council by the Natal India Congress forced the council to start a travelling service for non-European patrons.

The Afrikaans government during apartheid passed several discriminatory legislative measures including the Separate Amenities Act of 1953, forcing councils to provide separate amenities and services for each race. If the councils were unable to provide these amenities and services to all races, they focused solely on Whites. During this time the Afrikaans government became responsible for Black library provisions while the provinces became responsible for Colored, Indian and White library provisions, a fact that took two years for the South African Library Association to find out.

=== 21st century ===
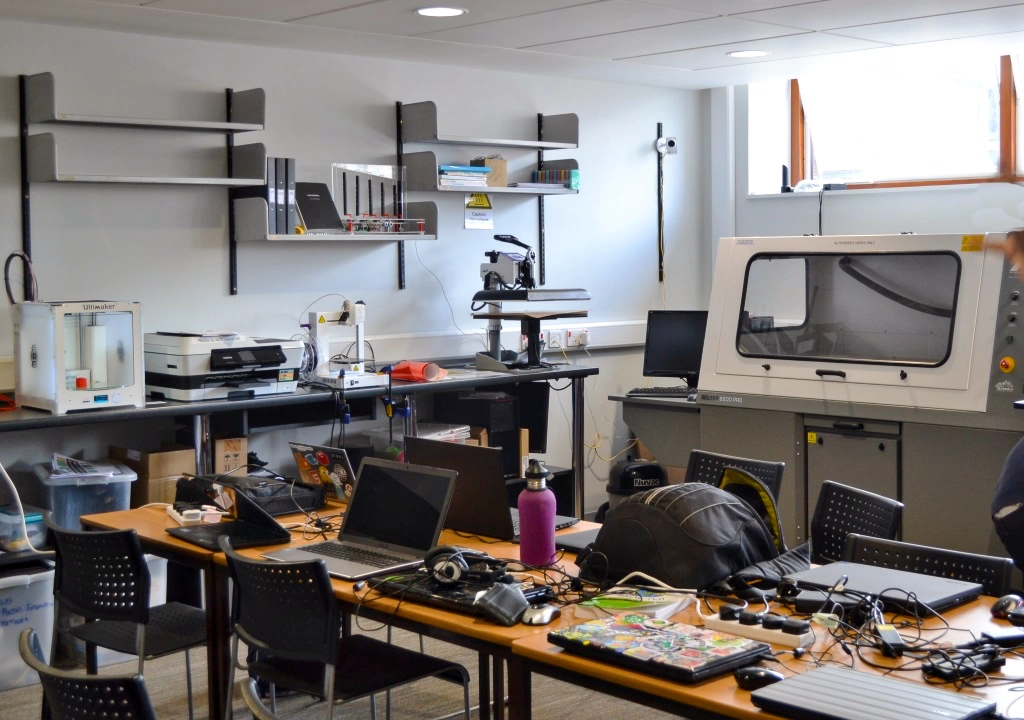
Fab lab in a library

In the 21st Century, libraries continue to change and evolve to match new trends involving the way that patrons consume books and other media. More than ever, the 21st Century library is the digital library. By 2017, 100% of US libraries offered internet access and 90% helped with internet skills. Librarians became increasingly responsible for both physical and digital collections. A digital collection can include sources created and distributed digitally and physical documents scanned and provided in a digital format. With an increase in demand for digital resources, library systems throughout the world have expanded their outreach. Driven by ebook reading apps that categorize content based on different popular groupings, digital book clubs, digital magazines, and easy-access digital library cards for ebooks and audiobooks ebook and audiobook use in libraries globally reached a record high with 326 million loans by the end of 2018. Libraries that lead the way in supplying digital books include the Toronto Public Library, which held the record for digital loans in 2019 with 6.6 million, and the National Library Board of Singapore, which expanded its digital collection and achieved 4.2 million digital loans in 2019.

Longhua, Shenzhen, Wangmin Street Public Library, self-service library kiosk

Digital libraries bring with them a whole host of new challenges such as: how the resources are distributed to patrons, whether or not authentication is required and the compatibility of patron hardware or software. They initially faced difficulty being integrated into libraries because there was the fear of a loss of community by adding ebooks and other technologies into public spaces; however, as a growing need for technology continued, so did the idea of merging ebooks within a library's current system. The addition of these and other technology, like computers, was found to increase the sense of community as people used libraries more frequently to access these sources. The need to negotiate license fees for ebooks at a lower rate than the standard perpetual licenses provided for print texts presented another challenge, but publishers began to switch over to temporary or metered licenses in order to provide libraries with a cheaper license option.

Other digital resources attract patrons to libraries for purposes other than books, especially those developed as part of the Maker movement, including Makerspaces (also known as Hackerspaces), a new trend designed to foster creativity and provide a space for library users to tinker, invent and socialize. Makerspaces feature both high and low-tech media, though many focus on advanced technology such as 3D printing or Virtual reality and making them available to users who might normally not have access to them; many might also feature video and audio recording studios, complete with advanced computers to help users edit their creations.

A challenge commonly faced by 21st-century libraries are budget-cuts, forcing librarians to become more efficient in the management of their funds and more vocal in the advocacy of their libraries. The American Library Association maintains a web page on navigating a challenging budget year. However, they are finding ways to adapt to people's needs, such as providing digital services to patrons at home, and creating more user-friendly places.

In 2020, the COVID-19 pandemic further changed how libraries operated. Libraries around the world were faced with really hard choices as to which services to offer and which services to shut down for a limited time. Most libraries resorted to online only resources such as e-book lending and other digital services. These decisions depended on both government sanctions, library directors, or other parties in charge as to how they wanted to proceed. Library operations during this time were delayed as virus contamination through book lending and return was suspected. Book returns in some cases had a longer return period or were kept in a book quarantine before being handled by personnel to be processed. Some libraries implemented various ticketing systems to limit the number of people in the library, or asked people to book visits in advance, others offered contactless pickup options. Libraries have since resumed normal operations, though many have continued to offer some of their COVID services, like online programing or curbside pickup, after recognizing a need for it in their communities.

== See also ==
- Bibliography
- Library science
- Public libraries
- History of the Internet

== Bibliography ==
- Armstrong, Gordon (2013). "The Culture and History of South African Public Libraries: The Experiences of Durban Library". Library History. 16 (1): 35–47. doi:10.1179/lib.2000.16.1.35. S2CID 145266891.
- Boutcher, Warren (2011). "Collecting Manuscripts and Printed Books in the Late Renaissance: Naudé and the Last Duke of Urbino's Library". Italian Studies. 66 (2): 206–220. doi:10.1179/174861811X13009843386558. S2CID 191540774.
- Buchanan, Sarah (2012). "Designing the Research Commons: Classical Models for School Libraries". School Libraries Worldwide. 18 (1): 56–69.
- Casson, Lionel (2001). Libraries in the ancient world. New Haven: Yale University Press. ISBN 9780300088090.
- Ewald, L. A. (2004). Library Culture in Ancient Rome, 100 B.C. – A.D. 400. Kentucky Libraries. Vol. 68. pp. 9–11.
- Kelly, Thomas (1966). Early Public Libraries: a history of public libraries in Great Britain before 1850. London: Library Association. ISBN 9780853653813.
- Murray, Stuart (2009). The Library: An Illustrated History. Chicago: Skyhorse and the American Library Association. ISBN 978-1-61608-453-0.
- Pettegree, Andrew, and Arthur der Weduwen. 2021. The library: a fragile history. London: Profile Books Ltd.
- Richardson, L. (1976). "The Evolution of the Porticus Octaviae". American Journal of Archaeology. 80 (1): 57–64. doi:10.2307/502937. ISSN 0002-9114. JSTOR 502937. S2CID 192959582.
