= Bustan al-jami =

Būstān al-jāmiʿ li-jamīʿ tawārīkh al-zamān (Arabic: بستان الجامع لجميع تواريخ الزمان, lit. 'General Garden of All the Histories of the Ages') is an anonymous Arabic chronicle from Ayyubid Syria.

The Būstān was written, probably in Aleppo, in the years 1196–1197 (592–59З AH). It may have been completed in Egypt. It survives in two manuscripts: one of the 14th-century, now Istanbul, Saray 2959, and the other Oxford, Huntington 172. In the Istanbul manuscript, the text is corrupted but the handwriting is neat. The scribe attributes it to a qāḍī named ʿImād al-Dīn al-Iṣfahānī, but if this is not a mistake it must be a different person from ʿImād al-Dīn al-Iṣfahānī, author of al-Barq al-Shāmī, whose information on the reign of Saladin is less extensive than that found in the Būstān and sometimes contradicts it. The scribe added a continuation to the Būstān, which, drawing on the works of Ibn al-Athīr and Ibn Wāṣil, brings the account down to the time of Baybars.

The Būstān is a "bare and summary history of Islam". It focuses on Aleppo and Egypt, but contains information not found in any earlier source. It is frequently an original source, especially as regards Egypt. It does share a lost source with Ibn Abī Ṭayyiʾ and cites al-ʿAẓīmī. The later works of Ibn Abī al-Dam and Ibn Wāṣil rely either on the Būstān or on one of its lost sources. One of these may have been a Shia source. Ibn Khallikān, Ibn Muyassar and al-Jazarī all make use of the Būstān as a source. It is a valuable source for the early Crusades.
