= Ibn Abi Tayyi =

Shi'i historian and poet

Ibn Abi Tayyi (Arabic: إبن أبي طيء) Yaḥyā Abū Zakariyyā ibn Ḥamīd al-Najjār (1180–1228) was a Shi'i historian and poet from Aleppo. Known for his Universal History, which is mostly lost, and is known to us through excerpts preserved by later writers. A valuable source for the history of Northern Syria in the times of the crusades, it also describes the Fatimid palaces in Cairo, the fall of the Fatimid dynasty, relations between Franks and Muslims, and the reign of Saladin and that of his son al-Ẓāhir Ghāzī.

He made use of a lost source also used by the anonymous author of the Būstān al-jāmiʿ.
