= Lending library =

Institution providing books on loan

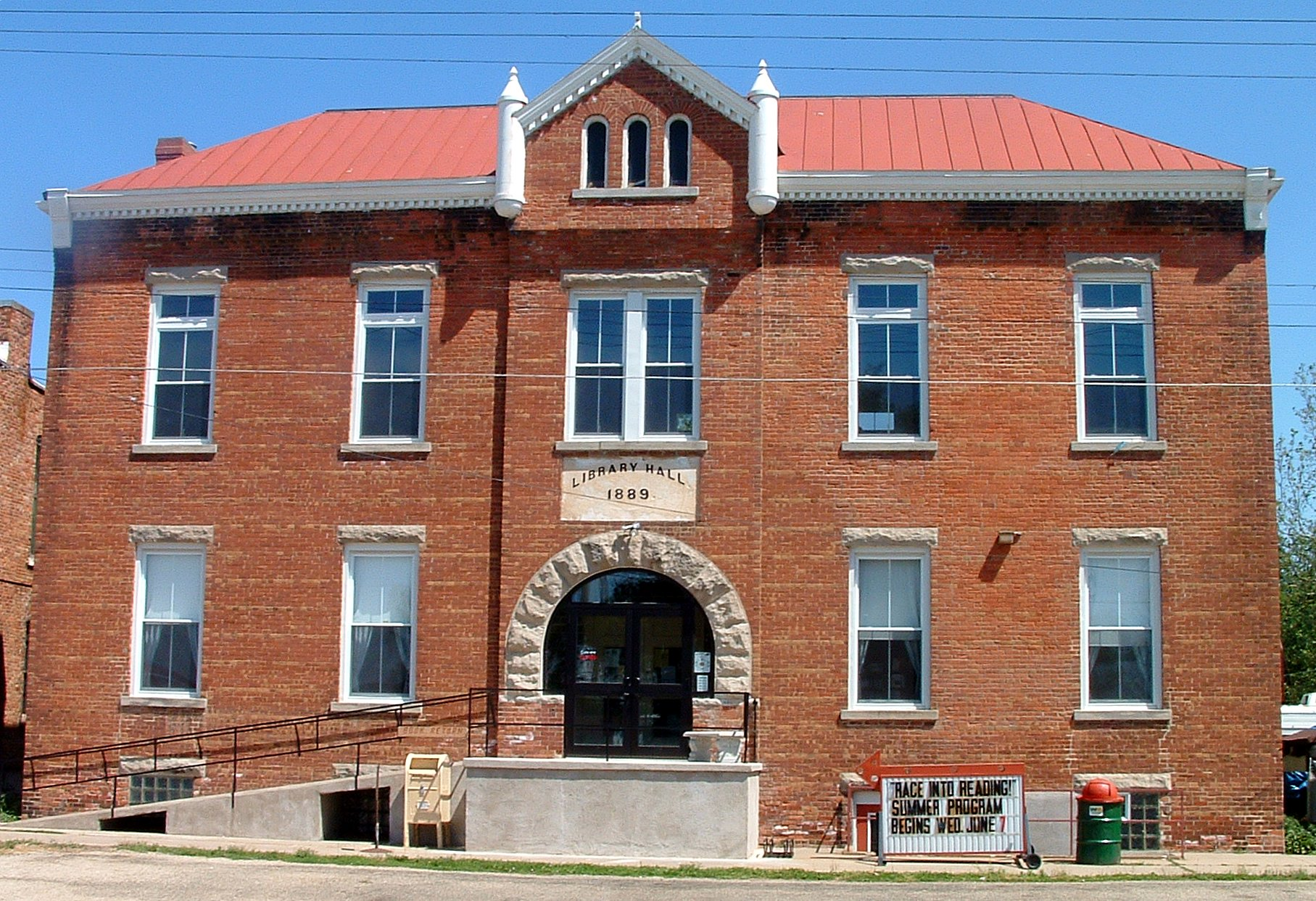
A public library building in Altona, Illinois, a small village in the Midwestern United States

A lending library is a library from which books and other media are lent out. The major classifications are endowed libraries, institutional libraries (the most diverse), public libraries, and subscription libraries. It may also refer to a library or other institution that sends materials on request to another library, usually via interlibrary loan.

== History ==
The earliest reference to or use of the term "lending library" yet located in English correspondence dates from ca. 1586; C'Tess Pembroke Ps. CXII. v, "He is ... Most liberall and lending," referring to the books of an unknown type of library, and later in a context familiar to users of contemporary English, in 1708, by J. Chamberlayne; St. Gt. Brit.; III. xii. 475 "[The Libraries] of Cambridge are Lending-libraries; that is, he that is qualified may borrow out of it any book he wants". This definition is closely associated with libraries in England before the Public Libraries Act 1850 was passed which allowed cities to use taxes to create and maintain libraries but did not require cities build them. This definition is also applicable in the United States before 1850 and widespread School District Library Acts which were passed in many states at the same time.

== Types of lending libraries ==
Wolfsburg Municipal Library by Alvar Aalto

Professor Thomas Gram Bell Kelly was the first library historian to address the problem of classification and nomenclature of libraries in his book Early public libraries: a history of public libraries in Great Britain before 1850. Leeds Library (founded 1768) a private subscription or proprietary library, is also referred to as a public library and a circulating library, illustrating the need for a taxonomy that is not confusing. The major classifications, based on ownership are endowed libraries, institutional libraries (the most diverse), public libraries, and subscription libraries.

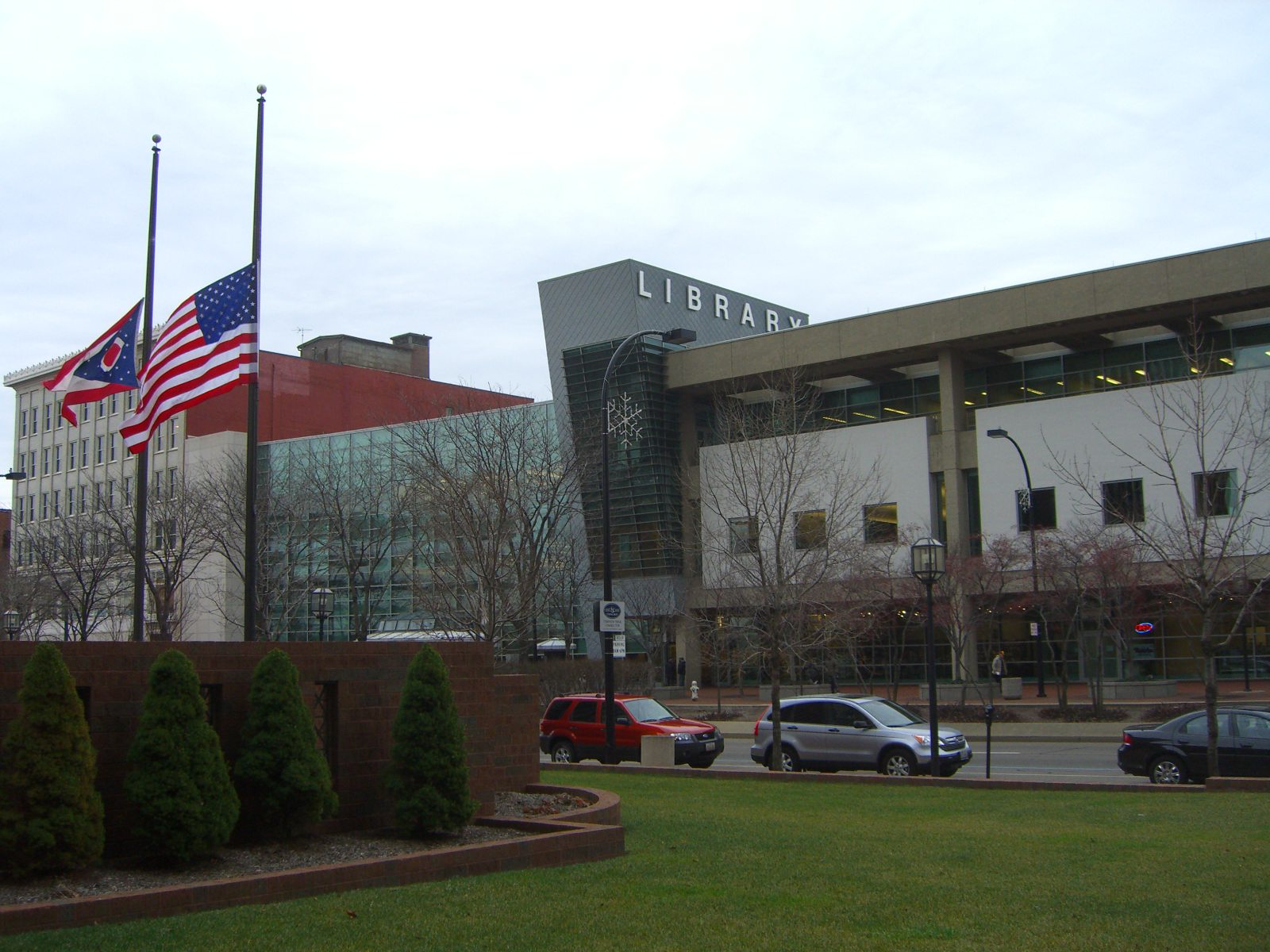
Akron-Summit County Public Library Main Library in Akron, Ohio

Without tax from the community a library may be created with a gift or endowment, by subscription, or by adding it on to an existing structure or institution which also serves other purposes. Cost is assumed by the donor or donors in an endowed library; it is assumed by the users in a subscription library, and could or could not be assumed by the users depending on the function of the institution, these variations could be combined in some cases. Private libraries are not covered by Kelly due to individual or small group ownership and his focus on the 'public' aspect of these institutions. The University of Zambia Library is an academic Library, which was founded in 1966 and officially opened in August 1969 by the first Republican President, Dr Kenneth D. Kaunda.

== Endowment libraries ==
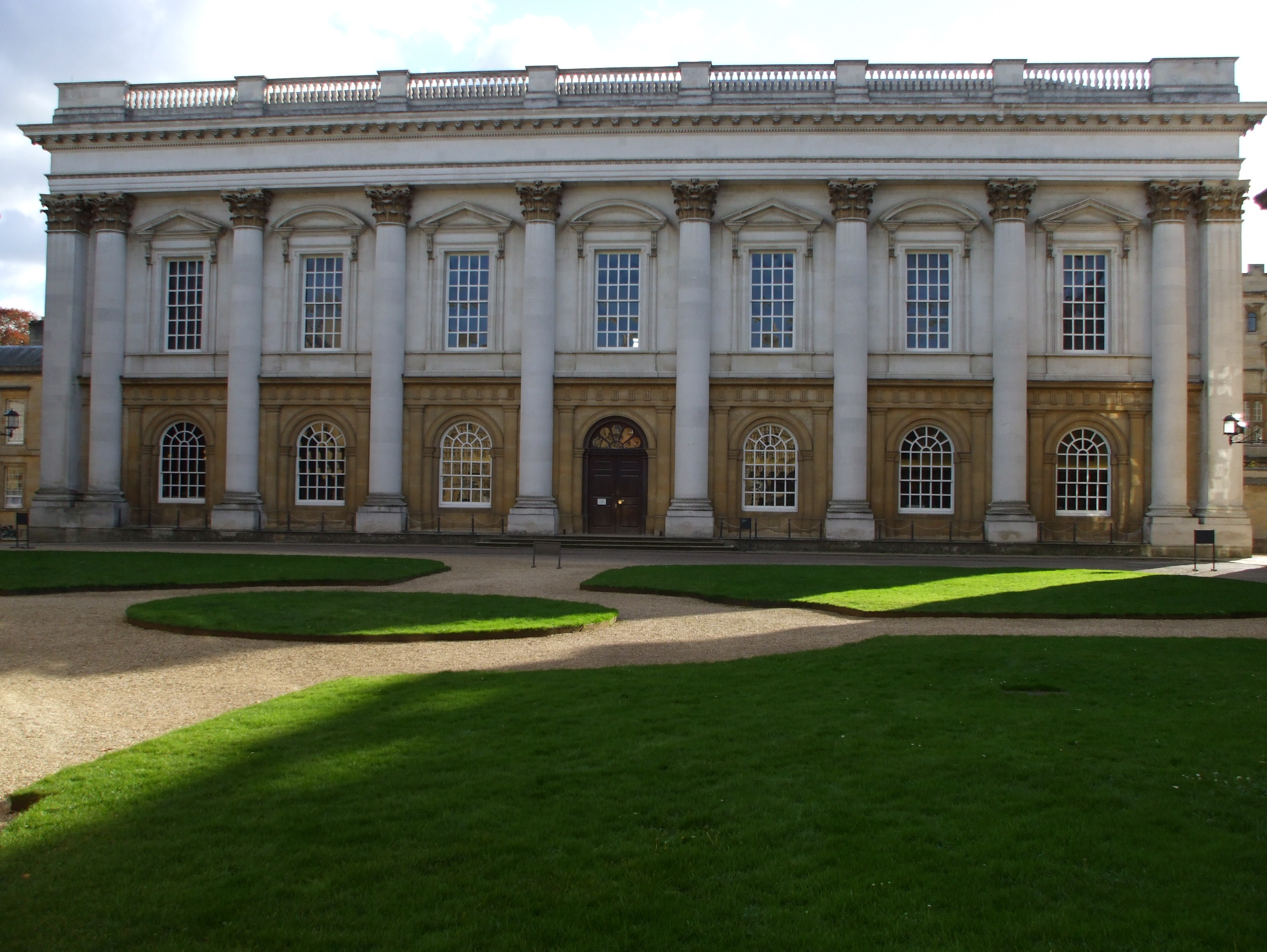
The Christ Church Library

Between the Reformation and the end of the eighteenth century, over two hundred endowed libraries are known to have been established in England alone, and existed due to the private library collections of individual benefactors or occasionally to multiple benefactors. Controlled by the local clergy, almost all endowed libraries were attached to parish churches in towns and cities, and were kept in the vestry, in the parvis over the south porch, in the parsonage, or in some nearby adjoining building. Frequently the books were chained, similar to those in the Francis Trigge Chained Library and at Christ Church Library. The two dozen or so libraries that did not match this template in England include a small but important group which were controlled from early on or the start by municipal corporations, founded in market towns before 1680.

== Parish church libraries ==
Early parish church libraries were stated to be for the use of local layman and clergy, but the books were not in English, were largely in Latin, and exclusively theological in character. Thomas Bray an Anglican cleric who originally had the idea of the parish library, who wrote in 1697, "An Essay Towards Promoting all Necessary and Useful Knowledge, Both Divine and human, In all the Parts of His Majesty's Dominions, Both at Home and Abroad", wanted the church to acquire books and lend them to the general public as well as the parishioners and clergy. Though the collections were mainly religious, the collection extended to literature and the classics, due to an underlying desire of Bray to guide education in a proper fashion. He also lobbied for public financing, and promoted the circulation of books so that the inhabitants of the parish could take them home.

Some contemporary churches such as St James' Church, Sydney, maintain lending libraries on theological and religious subjects for the use of their parishioners.

=== Parochial libraries ===
Parochial libraries were defined by Kelly to distinguish them from parish church libraries, whose books could be used by the locals and were often chained to desks. Parochial libraries instead were restricted to the use of parochial authorities, and often meant only for reference. The Church of England after the Restoration wished to reform the ministry of the church by investing in the learning and development of their pastoral care and teaching. Building libraries in poor benefices and isolated ones was part of that initiative, and an extension of a major philanthropic movement during that time. The movement included charity schools which would teach the children of the poor the Catechism and to read, establishing trust funds for the poor, and develop programs to repair existing parish churches and build new churches.

== Municipal corporation libraries ==
Municipal corporation libraries were to be for the use of shopkeepers and aldermen, and to disseminate knowledge, but the one in Bristol, according to its catalog, revealed that all the early books were not in English but were in Greek or Latin, limiting their usefulness. Other libraries that were bequeathed or endowed by individual citizens to towns and cities, were managed by a non-religious group of trustees, such as in Manchester, where the library was managed by a self elected body of up to twenty-four members, who also had the duty to purchase new books, even though they employed a full-time librarian. In Leicester, the library was looked upon by townsfolk with civic pride, proclaiming that the library would bring fame, honor, and renown to the Corporation and place it was located. Bristol, Leicester and Manchester libraries all chained their books to the book press or desk for security purposes, at Leicester this was done right to the 1820s.

=== Institutional libraries ===
Institutional libraries in England were originally almost non-existent in 1750; however, by 1850 there was an established network of these specialized libraries, which had been developed mostly through private enterprise, though some government involvement had started. The specialized libraries were mainly medical libraries which early on included chemistry and botany, and later developed to serve medical professionals. Since there were few professional scientists before 1850, people interested in science relied mainly on general circulating libraries, rather than institutional libraries to meet their needs.

== Social libraries ==
Social libraries peaked in significance by the mid-nineteenth century, and all their many forms have been the object of intense research in North America and Europe. Davis and Tucker explain that:

"The term social library has come to signify the kind of library that generally provided a circulating collection of materials and frequently a reading room for the use of any persons meeting the established criteria, which usually involved a fee or subscription, or a payment to become a joint owner or stockholder, of the library".

These libraries were often referred to as "public libraries" during the nineteenth century. This appellation over time came to describe tax-supported, publicly administered libraries open to all regardless of class, race or age for free on an equal basis, at least in theory. It is understandable that the nomenclature of libraries is varied among patrons, employees and historians, who have had the difficult task of defining and separating the various types of libraries into manageable classifications.

== Hidden libraries ==
It is impossible to cover all types of libraries throughout all stages of history and classify or define them to the satisfaction of all, but the variety and evolution of libraries needs to be explored further. Hidden libraries is a widespread description of libraries in any place from prisoner-of-war camps, military installations, motels, hotels, inns, the home, alternative communities, pubs, restaurants, laundrettes, holiday camps, coffee houses, community centres, in accommodations and facilities for workers and servants, lighthouse and seamen's establishments, prisons and asylums and is not complete. Libraries connected to transportation also abound from airliners, railways, tramcars, buses, various ships, and way stations.

The Tabard Inn Library exchange stations were part of a commercial lending library system, where exchange stations could be set up in any location from retail establishments, offices, and private homes.

== See also ==
- Library science
- Librarian
- List of libraries
- Mechanics' Institutes
- Public library
- Subscription library
- Browne Issue System
