= Spine shelving =

Book shelving technique

Spine shelving is a book-shelving technique where the spine faces downward resting on the shelf.

Books are usually shelved upright with the spines facing out. When a book is taller than the distance between shelves, it is usually placed sideways or shelved horizontally i.e., flat. Shelving with the spine facing outwards protects the book from damage and makes it easier to see the information about a book. Spines normally include the book title, the author's name, and the publisher. In libraries, they may also include the call number.

The opposite, with the spine facing inwards, is called foredge shelving.

== History ==
Prior to the invention of the printing press, books were sparse and early libraries did not require formal shelving techniques; books were usually stored on sloped shelves for display or stacked horizontally with their spines facing into the shelf. The Chained Library was created in the late Middle Ages as a way to provide broad access to books. Available books were chained to shelves as security measures, and faced fore-edge out so the chain could be attached without causing damage. Libraries would often provide a list of books at the end of the row or shelf marks on the fore-edge of the book. Some libraries and private collections added handwritten titles or fore-edge paintings on the base related to the topic to identify the book. Early book spines did not contain wording or information, as they were not seen when books were shelved.

Production of more books in the 16th century required better storage to fit more on shelves. A change from horizontal to vertical shelving became commonplace in the early 17th century. As collections grew, it became difficult to retrieve books of interest under heavy horizontal stacks, and chains became entangled; vertical storage allowed for easy retrieval. Spine shelving started on lower shelves where books were placed spine out to protect them from potential damage by foot traffic.

The beginnings of adding information on spines date back to the early 1500s. Later, in the mid-16th century, it became fashionable for collectors to display books decoratively with many rebinding books in similar material shelving spine out to display the craftsmanship. Marking book design with information became necessary to distinguish bound materials, and a way for booksellers to promote their publications.

== See also ==
- Chained library
- Book design
- Bookbinding
