= Langley, Berkshire =

Area of the Borough of Slough, Berkshire, England

Coordinates: 51.5059°N 0.5526°W

Langley
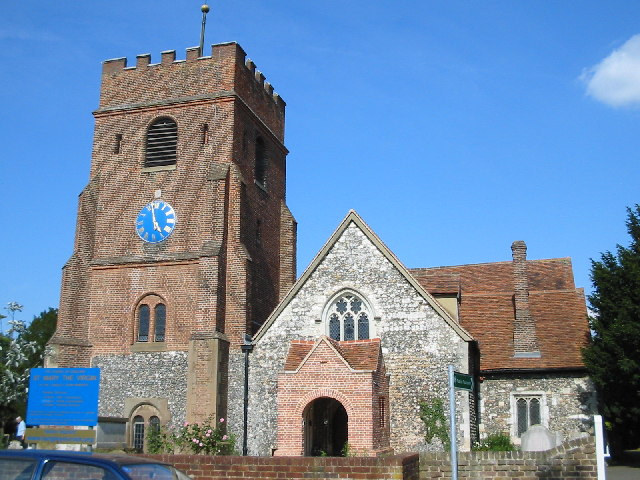
- St Mary the Virgin parish church

- Location within Berkshire
- Area: 3.6 km^{2} (1.4 sq mi)
- Population: 17,583
  - Density: 4,884/km^{2} (12,650/sq mi)
- OS grid reference: TQ005795
- Unitary authority: Slough
- Ceremonial county: Berkshire
- Region: South East
- Country: England
- Sovereign state: United Kingdom
- Post town: Slough
- Postcode district: SL3
- Dialling code: 01753
- Police: Thames Valley
- Fire: Royal Berkshire
- Ambulance: South Central
- UK Parliament: Slough Windsor
- Website: Langley Village

Langley, also known as Langley Marish, is an area of the Borough of Slough in Berkshire, England. It is two miles (3 km) east of Slough town centre and 18 miles (29 km) west of Charing Cross in Central London. It was a separate civil parish and village until the 1930s, when the built-up part of Langley was incorporated into Slough. Langley was in the historic county of Buckinghamshire, being transferred to the administrative county of Berkshire in 1974.

== Etymology ==
The place-name Langley derives from the Middle English word lang, meaning long, and lea, a wood or clearing. Langley was formed of a number of clearings: George Green, Horsemoor Green, Middle Green, Sawyers Green and Shreding Green. They became the sites for housing which merged into one village centred on the parish church in St Mary's Road. The clearings are remembered in the names of streets or smaller green fields.

Marish or Maries commemorates Christiana de Marecis who held the manor for a short time in the reign of Edward I.

== History ==
=== Notable buildings ===
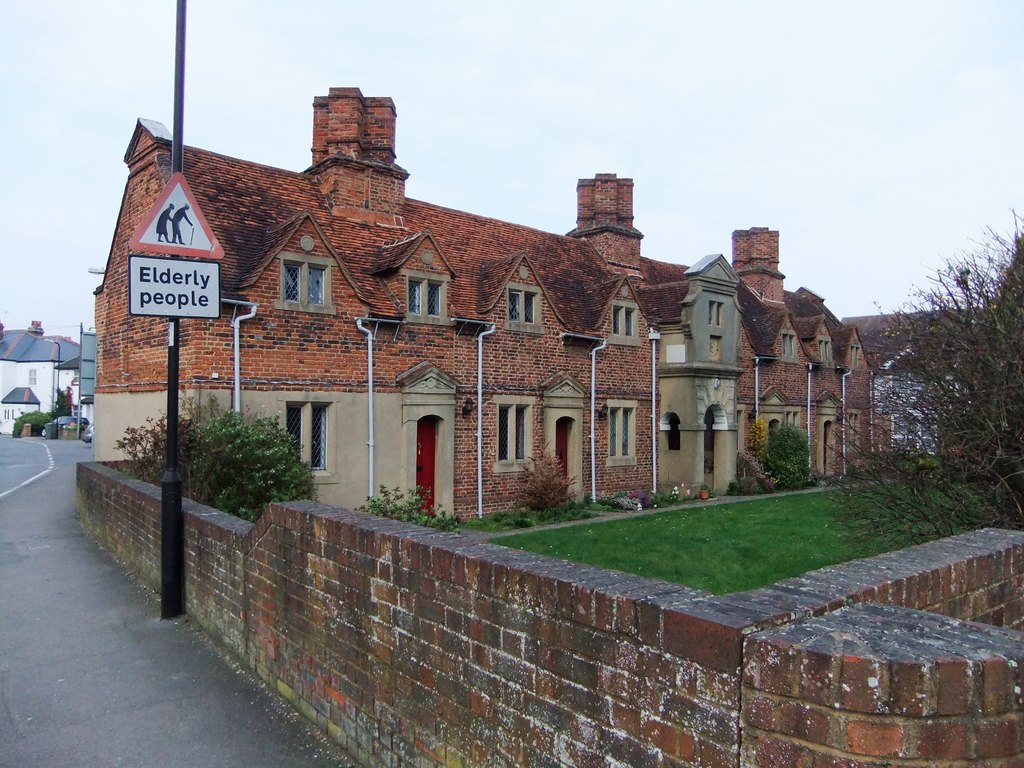
Seymour Almshouses

The Church of St Mary the Virgin is in the Church of England diocese of Oxford. The church is a Grade I listed building and houses the Kedermister Library, given by Sir John Kedermister (or Kederminster), who also endowed the surviving almshouses of 1617 in the village. Other surviving almshouses include the Seymour Almshouses (1679–1688), given by Sir Edward Seymour who was a Speaker of the House of Commons, and those founded in 1839 by William Wild in Horsemoor Green.

The courtier Henry Norris owned a house, "Parlaunt" or "Leving", at Langley Marish. The property was forfeited to the crown when he was executed in May 1536. When Henry married Anne of Cleves in 1540, furnishings from Parlaunt were taken to Oatlands Palace. There are no remains of this manor house.

Sir John Kedermister's house, Langley Park (bought by Charles Spencer, 3rd Duke of Marlborough) was demolished and rebuilt to designs by Stiff Leadbetter, starting in 1756 and completed in the year of his death, 1758.

The Langley Academy secondary school opened in 2008 and was designed by architects Foster + Partners.

=== Langley Airfield ===
The Hawker Aircraft Company bought Parlaunt Farm at Langley in 1938 and built a major factory and airfield there. During World War II, more than 9,000 military aircraft were manufactured at the site, with the majority being Hurricanes, but also including Tempests and Sea Fury's. The final Hurricane built (a MkIIC serialled PZ865, which still flies today with the Battle of Britain Memorial Flight) was completed here on 27 July 1944 and named 'Last of The Many' in a special ceremony. Retiring Chief Test Pilot P W S 'George' Bulman made the first flight of this the aeroplane on this occasion – he having made the first flight of the prototype from Brooklands almost nine years earlier.

The Hawker Tornado (1940), Typhoon (1940), Tempest (1942), Fury (1944), Sea Fury (1945), and the General Aircraft Hamilcar X tank-carrying glider (1945) all made their first flights from Langley. Postwar, the aerodrome was also used by Airwork Services, British South American Airways and Airflight for aircraft maintenance work.

The Hawker factory closed in 1958 having also manufactured Hawker Hunter fighters and earlier jet prototypes. Production and staff were transferred to the flight test airfield at Dunsfold Aerodrome and the parent Hawker factory in Kingston-on-Thames (now Kingston upon Thames), both in Surrey. Little of the factory or airfield remain today although the area's aviation past is remembered in street-names such as Spitfire Close and Hurricane Way. A marker stone was unveiled by the Airfields of Britain Conservation Trust on 5 October 2019.

=== Ford factory ===
The Ford Motor Company opened a commercial vehicle component factory at Langley Airfield in 1949, and then bought the entire site from Hawker Siddeley in 1959. The former aircraft factory was re-used for commercial vehicle manufacture and the Ford Transit was built here until production was transferred to Ford's Southampton plant at Swaythling, Southampton, and later the Ford Cargo. The Langley factory became part of Iveco in 1986 but finally closed in September 1997. Demolished a year later by Gregory Demolition, the site is now redeveloped with new housing, offices and warehousing (including Royal Mail's Heathrow Worldwide Distribution Centre, which services nearby Heathrow Airport).

=== Miscellaneous ===
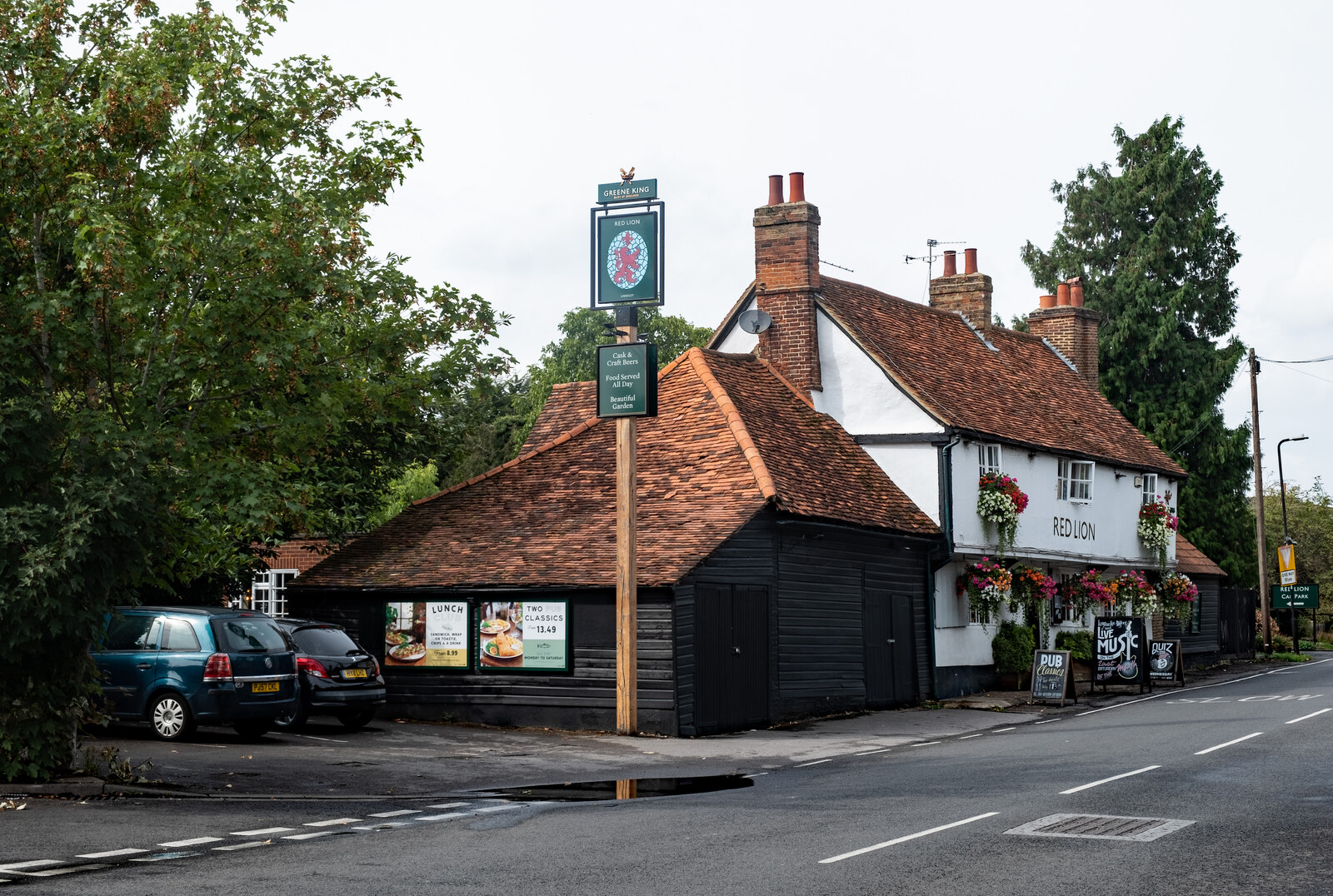
The Red Lion public house, St Mary's Road

Langley Carnival is held annually on the second Saturday in July at the Langley Park Memorial Recreation Ground.

The Cable Corporation, based at Langley, was the first cable company in the world to offer voice, video and data services to business and residential users.

Langley is reputed to be haunted by a ghost in a yellow coat.

== Transport ==
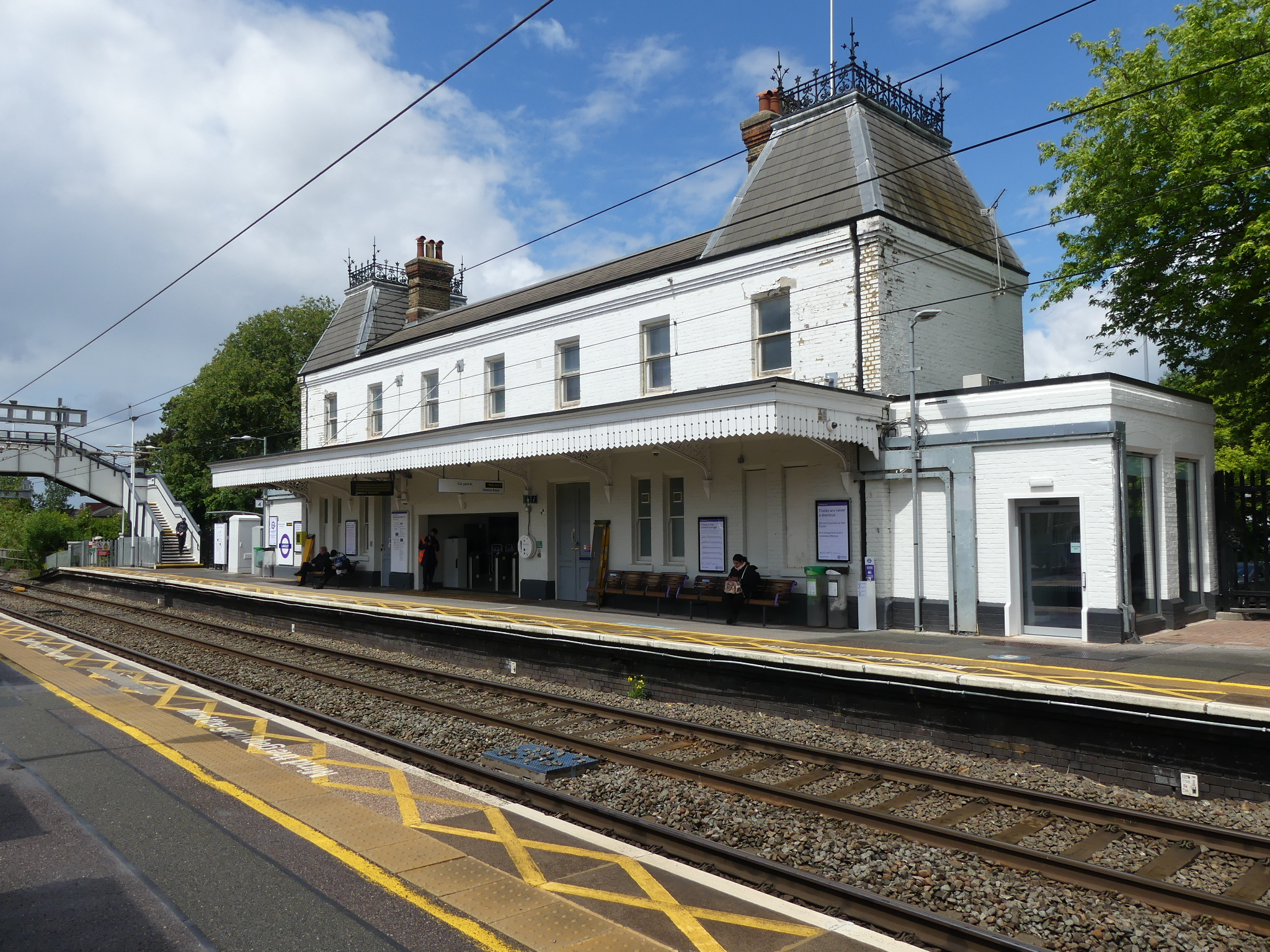
Langley railway station

Langley railway station, which includes an Isambard Kingdom Brunel period building, is on the Great Western Main Line to London Paddington. Great Western Railway operate a half-hourly service in each direction. In July 2012, the Department for Transport announced plans to build the Western Rail Approach between Langley and Iver stations.

On 15 December 2019, Langley station became part of the Elizabeth line with services operated under TfL Rail branding until 24 May 2022. Due to the addition of the Elizabeth line, the station was upgraded to include three new lifts along with a new ticket hall, new ticket office and new ticket gates.

== Governance ==
Langley forms part of the unparished area of Slough. It therefore has no separate parish or community council, but is governed directly by Slough Borough Council.

Langley was formerly a separate parish, also known as Langley Marish or Langley Marsh. From 1835 the parish formed part of the Eton Poor Law Union. When parish and district councils were established under the Local Government Act 1894, the parish of Langley was given a parish council and was included in the Eton Rural District. Following significant development in the southern part of the parish adjoining Slough, the area south of the Grand Union Canal (including the parish church and old village centre of Langley), was transferred into the parish and urban district of Slough on 1 April 1930. The residual, more rural, part of the parish north of the Grand Union Canal continued to be administered as a parish called Langley for another four years before being finally abolished, with most of the northern rural area being transferred into the parish of Wexham on 1 April 1934, and smaller areas being transferred at the same time to the parishes of Fulmer and Iver. In 1931 the parish had a population of 1180.

== Notable people ==
- Entrepreneur Peter Jones, born in Langley in 1966
- Artist Paul Nash (1889–1946), buried in the churchyard of St. Mary's Church, Langley
- Writer John Pudney (1909–77), born in Langley
- Writer Charles Tyrie grew up in Langley in the 1940s and 1950s; the first volume of his autobiography is titled The Langley Boy.
- Nathaniel Vincent (1639?–97), nonconformist minister and writer, lived in Langley after the Restoration, until ejected in 1662
- Footballer Matty Cash (1997-), grew up in Langley

== Sources and further reading ==
- Fraser, Maxwell (1973). The History of Slough. Slough: Slough Corporation. p. 148.
- Mason, Francis K (1991). Hawker Aircraft Since 1920 (3rd revised ed.). London: Putnam. ISBN 0-85177-839-9.
- Page, W.H., ed. (1925). A History of the County of Buckingham, Volume 3. Victoria County History. pp. 294–301.
- Pevsner, Nikolaus (1973) [1960]. Buckinghamshire. The Buildings of England. Harmondsworth: Penguin Books. pp. 181–183. ISBN 0-14-071019-1.
- Pudney, John (1955). Six Great Aviators – A V Roe; Alcock & Brown; Lindbergh; Kingsford-Smith; Saint-Exupery; Neville Duke. Hamish Hamilton.
- Shaw, Stuart (July 2000). "The History of Langley Aircraft Factory and Airfield". Airfield Review: 17–19.
- "Langley Marish Buckinghamshire". visionofbritain.org.uk.
