= Charles Morice (British Army officer) =

British army officer (1775–1815)

- Born: 1775
- Died: 18 June, 1815 (aged 39–40)
- Military career
- Allegiance: United Kingdom
- Branch: British Army
- Rank: Lieutenant-Colonel
- Commands: 15th (The Yorkshire East Riding) Regiment of Foot; 3rd Ceylon Regiment; 69th Regiment of Foot

Lieutenant-Colonel Charles Morice (1775 – 18 June 1815) was a British Army officer killed at the Battle of Waterloo.

== Life ==
Educated at Eton, he joined the 15th (The Yorkshire East Riding) Regiment of Foot as an ensign on 1 June 1793. He was promoted to lieutenant on 6 December 1794; to captain-lieutenant 27 August 1799; to captain on 10 November 1800 and to major on 17 July 1802. He transferred first to Colonel Ramsay's Regiment 21 May 1803 then to Colonel Baille's Regiment on 9 August 1806 and then to the 3rd Ceylon Regiment on 31 July 1806. He was promoted to lieutenant-colonel on 7 January 1808 and was given command of the 2nd battalion of 69th Regiment of Foot on 4 June 1813. His final promotion was to brevet colonel on 4 June 1814.

Morice was wounded in the night attack on Bergen-op-Zoom on the 8/9 March 1814.

== Death ==
As a result of either the inexperience or incompetence of William, Prince of Orange, commander of I Corps. soon after his arrival at Quatre Bras on 16 June, Morice had been ordered to form his battalion of the 69th into square by Maj-General Sir Colin Halkett, commander of the 5th Brigade, when the Prince of Orange rode up and asked him why. He replied that they had been ordered to do so "not more than a few minutes ago". The Prince replied, "Colonel, there is really no chance of cavalry coming on. Reform column immediately then get back into line." Moments later the French cavalry charged, whereupon the king's colour lost.

He was killed at the battle of Waterloo.

His death is commemorated in a memorial tablet in St Mary the Virgin Church in Langley near Slough, Berkshire.
