= St Mary the Virgin Church, Langley =

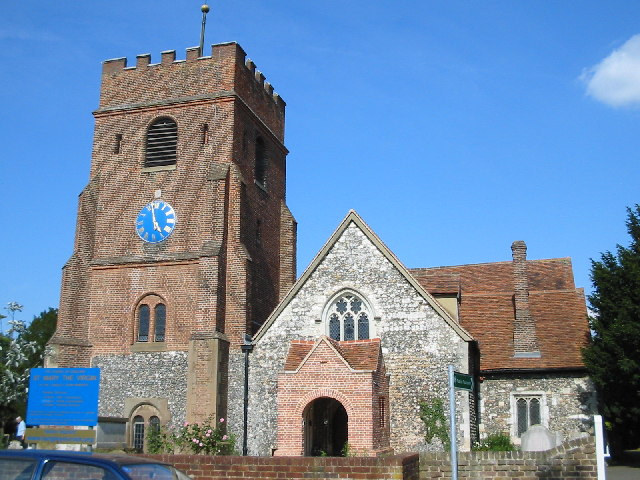

- Location in Berkshire
- 51.505732°N 0.553447°W
- OS grid reference: TQ 00483 79533
- Location: Langley
- Country: England
- Denomination: Church of England
- Website: http://langleymarish.com/stmary/

History
- Founded: c.1150
- Dedication: St Mary

Architecture
- Functional status: Active
- Heritage designation: Grade I

Administration
- Diocese: Oxford

St Mary the Virgin Church is a Church of England parish church in the village of Langley in Berkshire, England. It is dedicated to St Mary the Virgin, and is in the diocese of Oxford. The church dates from about 1150 and is a Grade I listed building.

The church houses the Kedermister Library, given by Sir John Kedermister (or Kederminster), who also endowed the surviving almshouses of 1617 in the village.

The churchyard is the resting place of Charles Morice (1775–1815), who was killed at the Battle of Waterloo and of the British war artist Paul Nash (1889–1946).

== Gallery ==
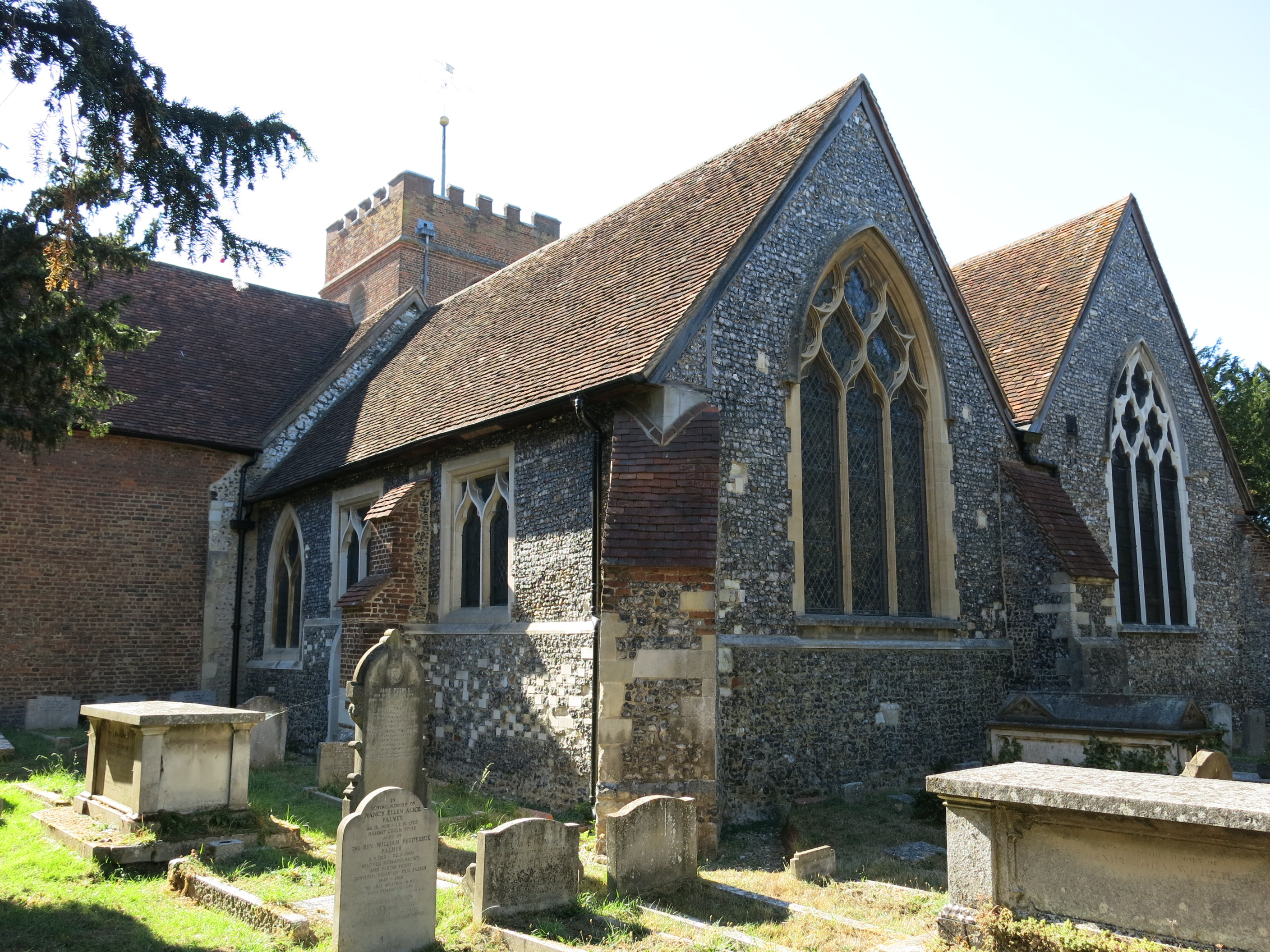

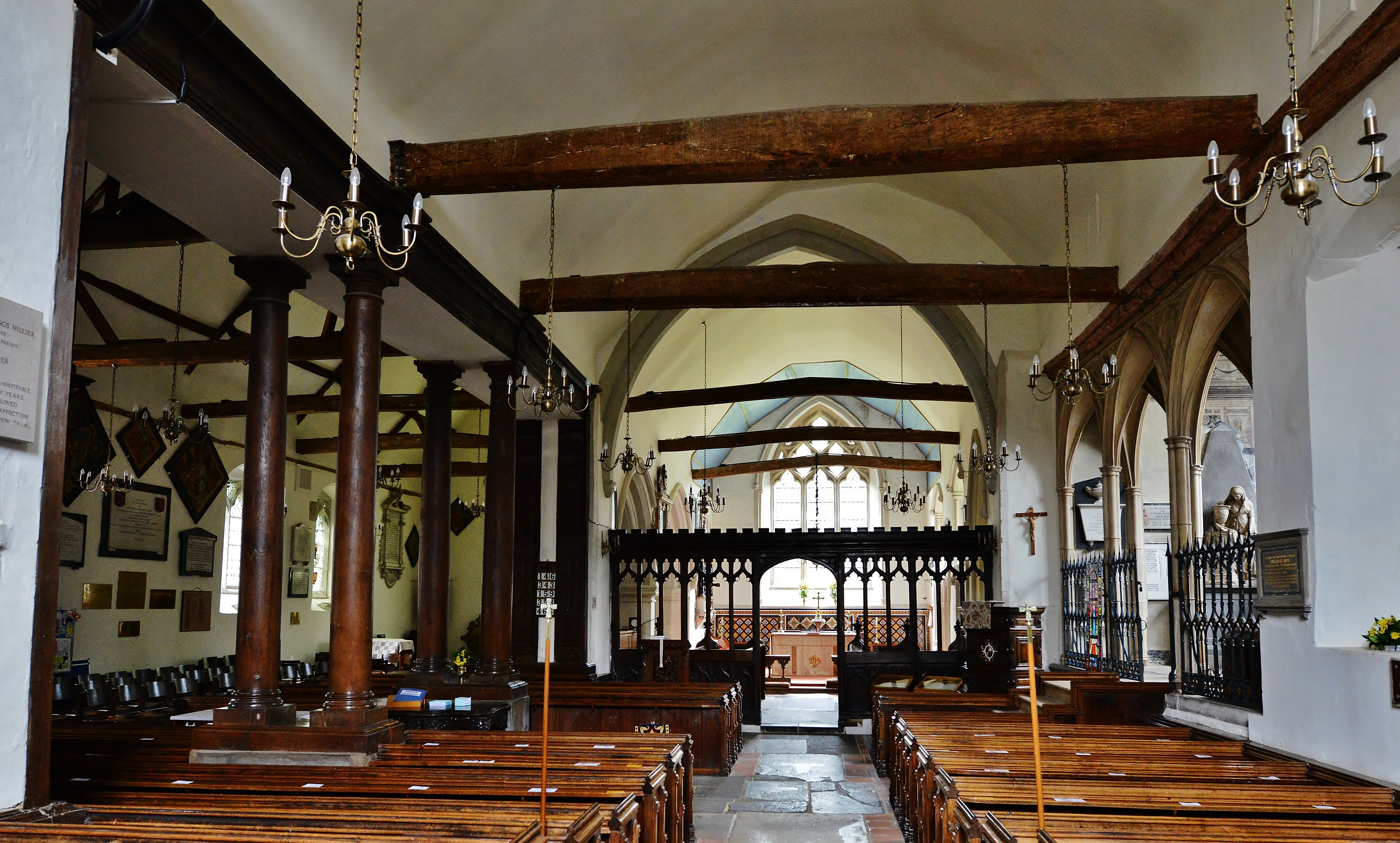

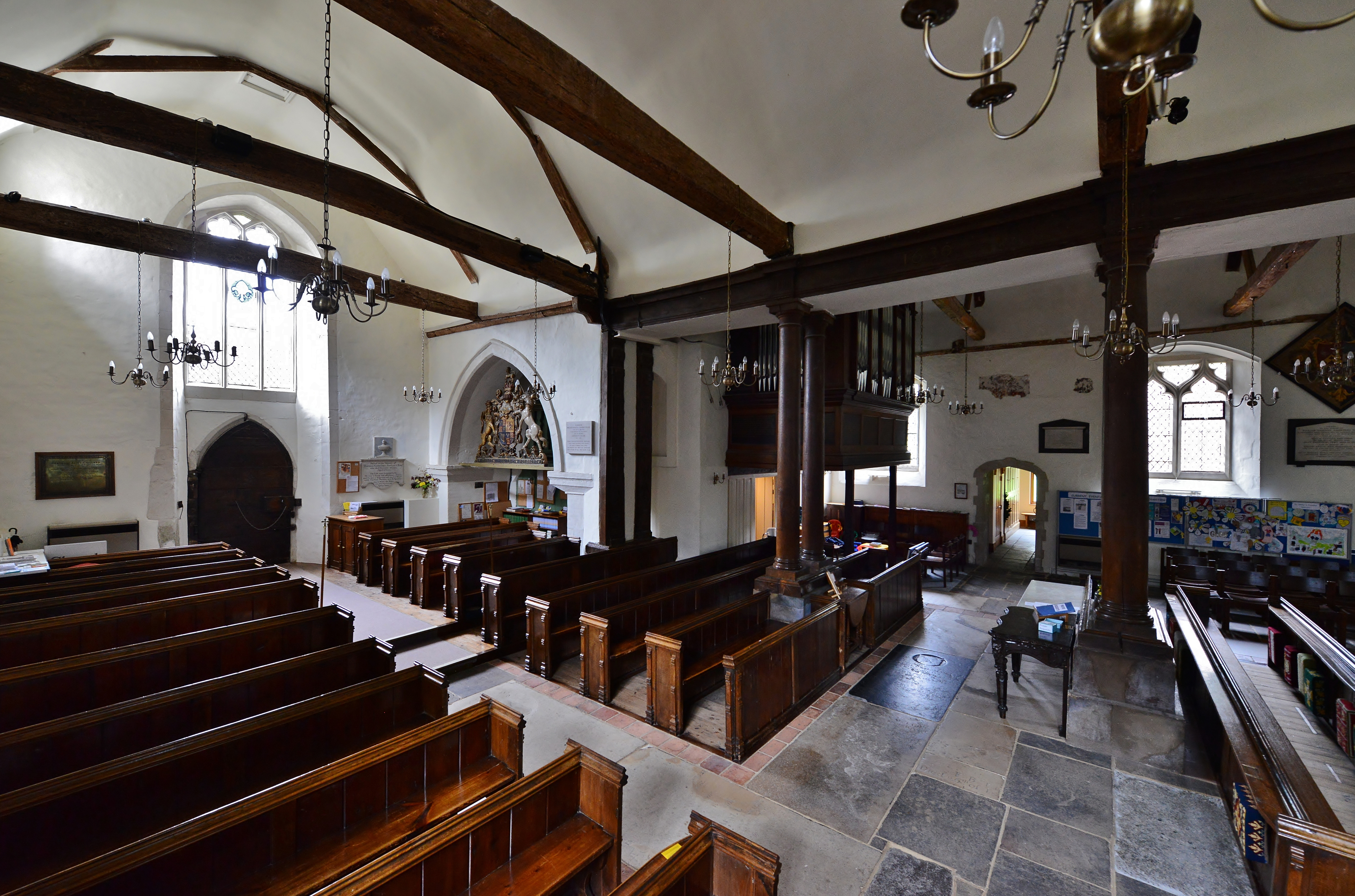

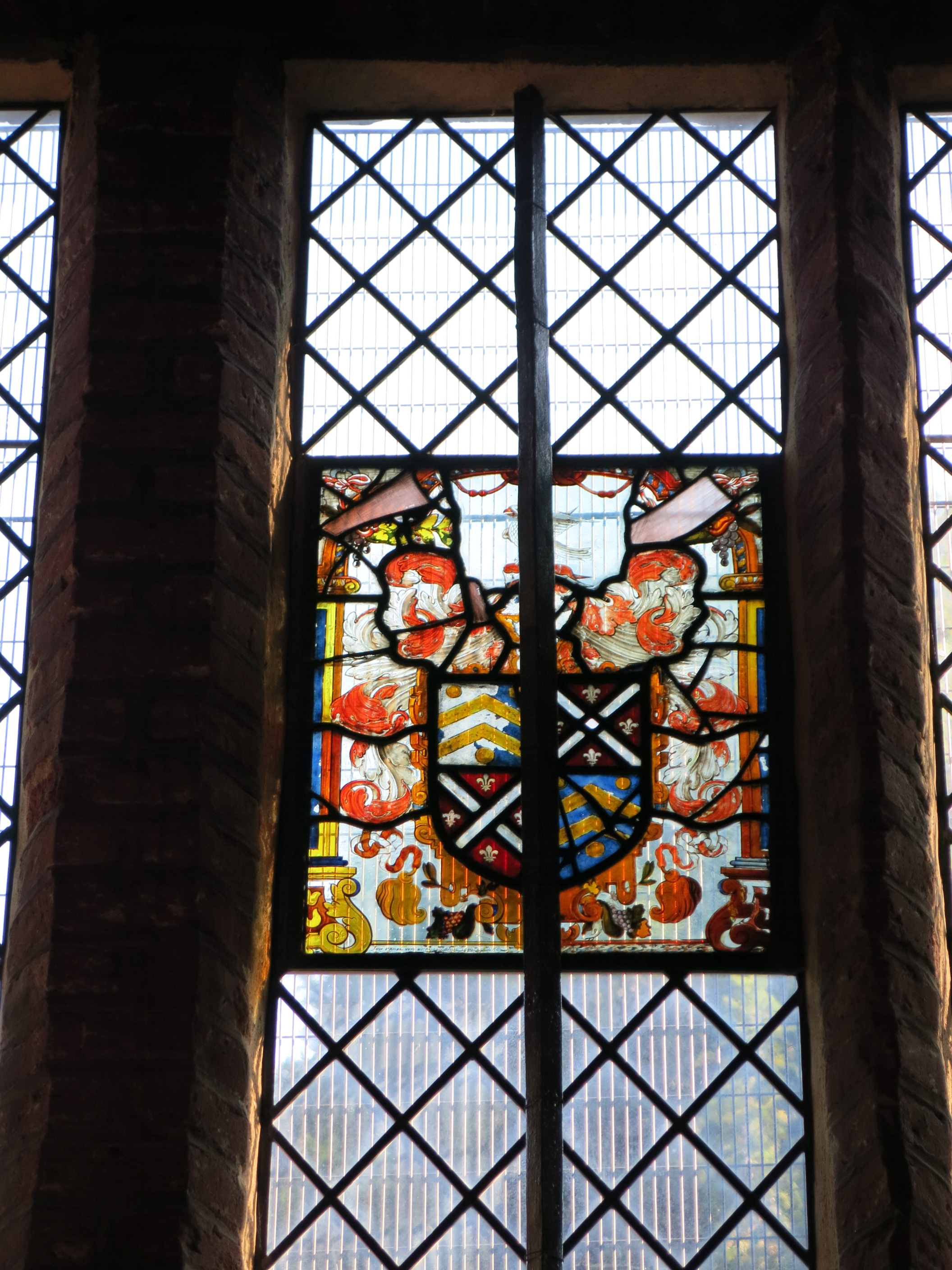

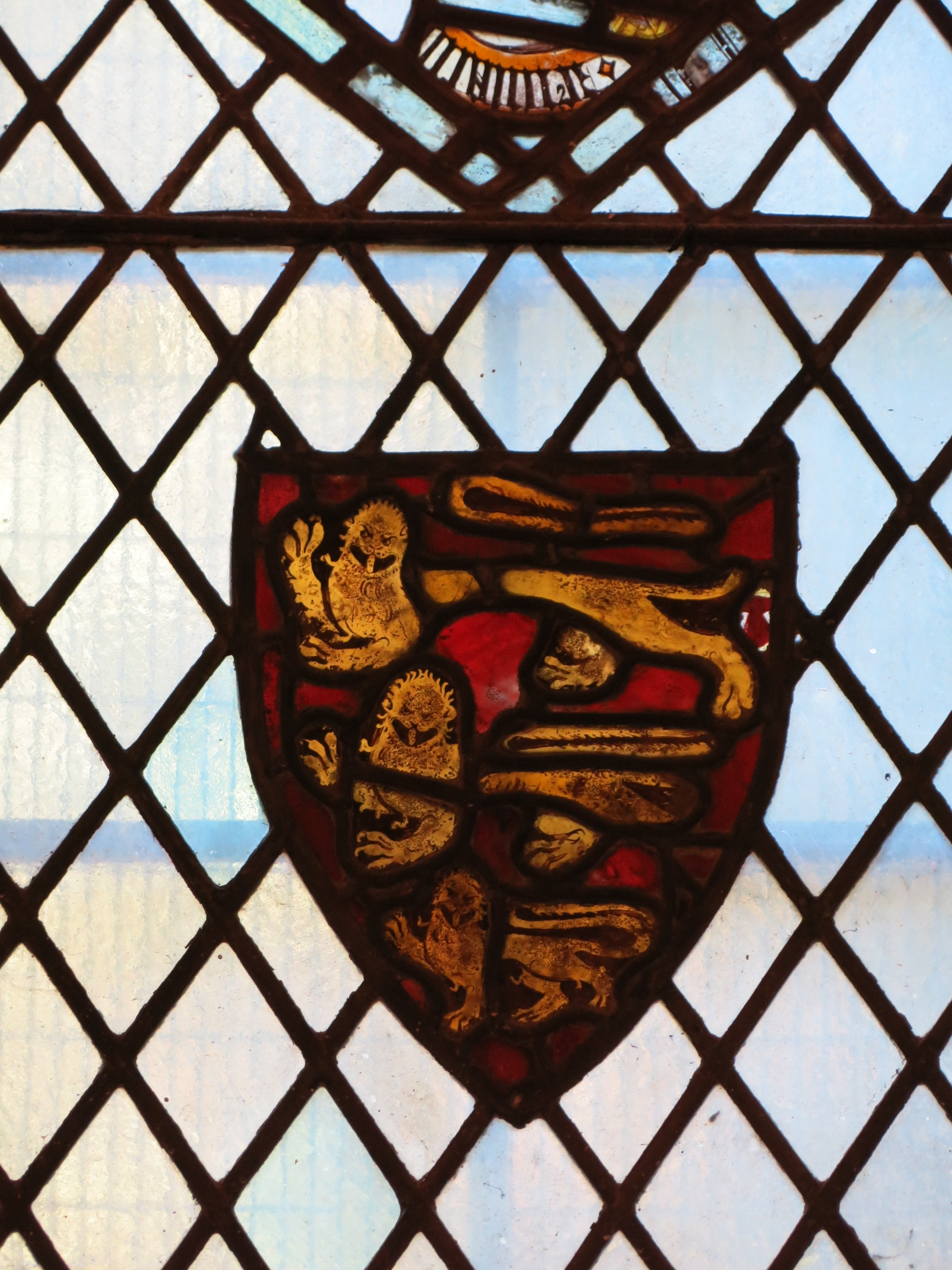

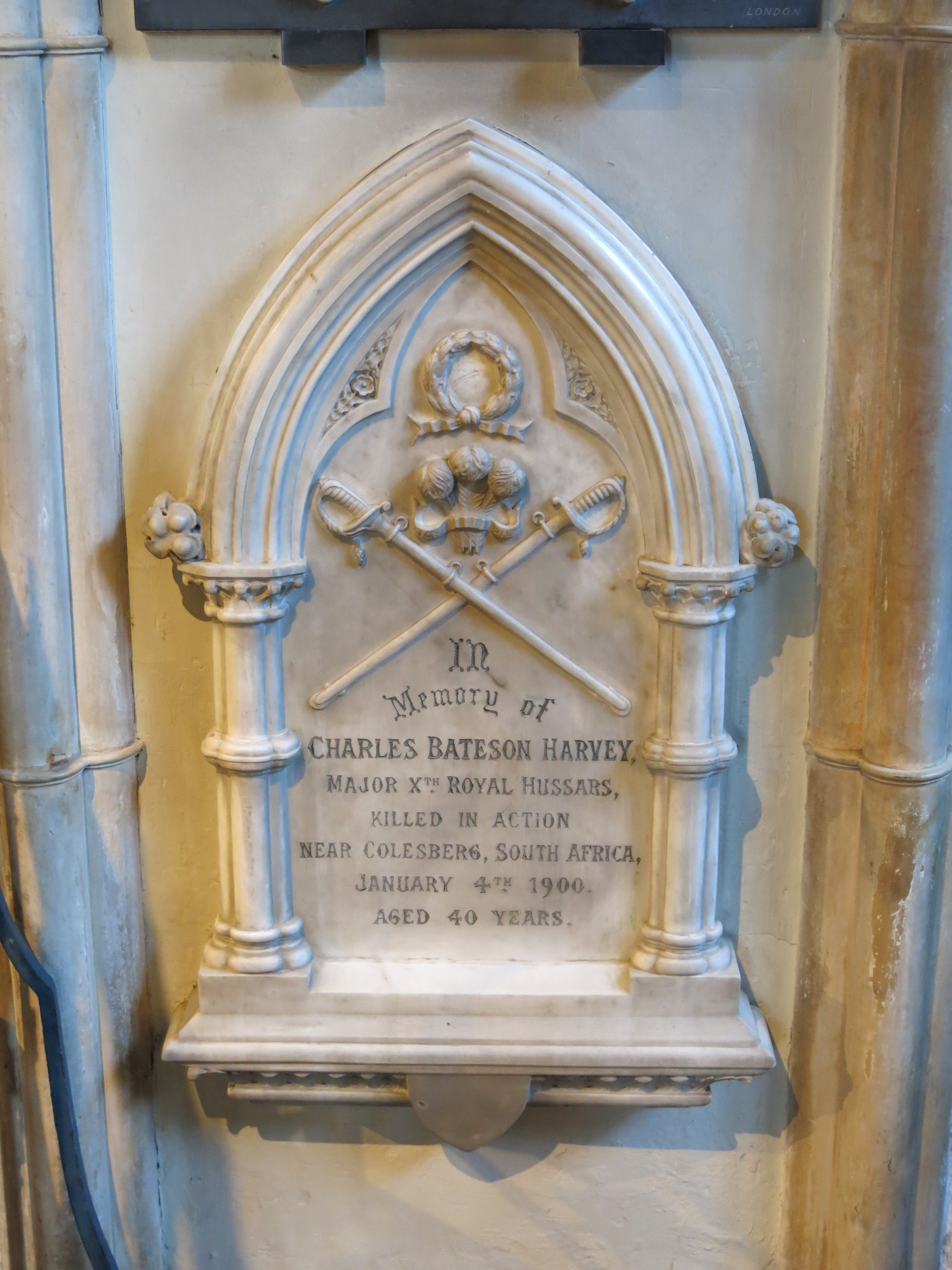

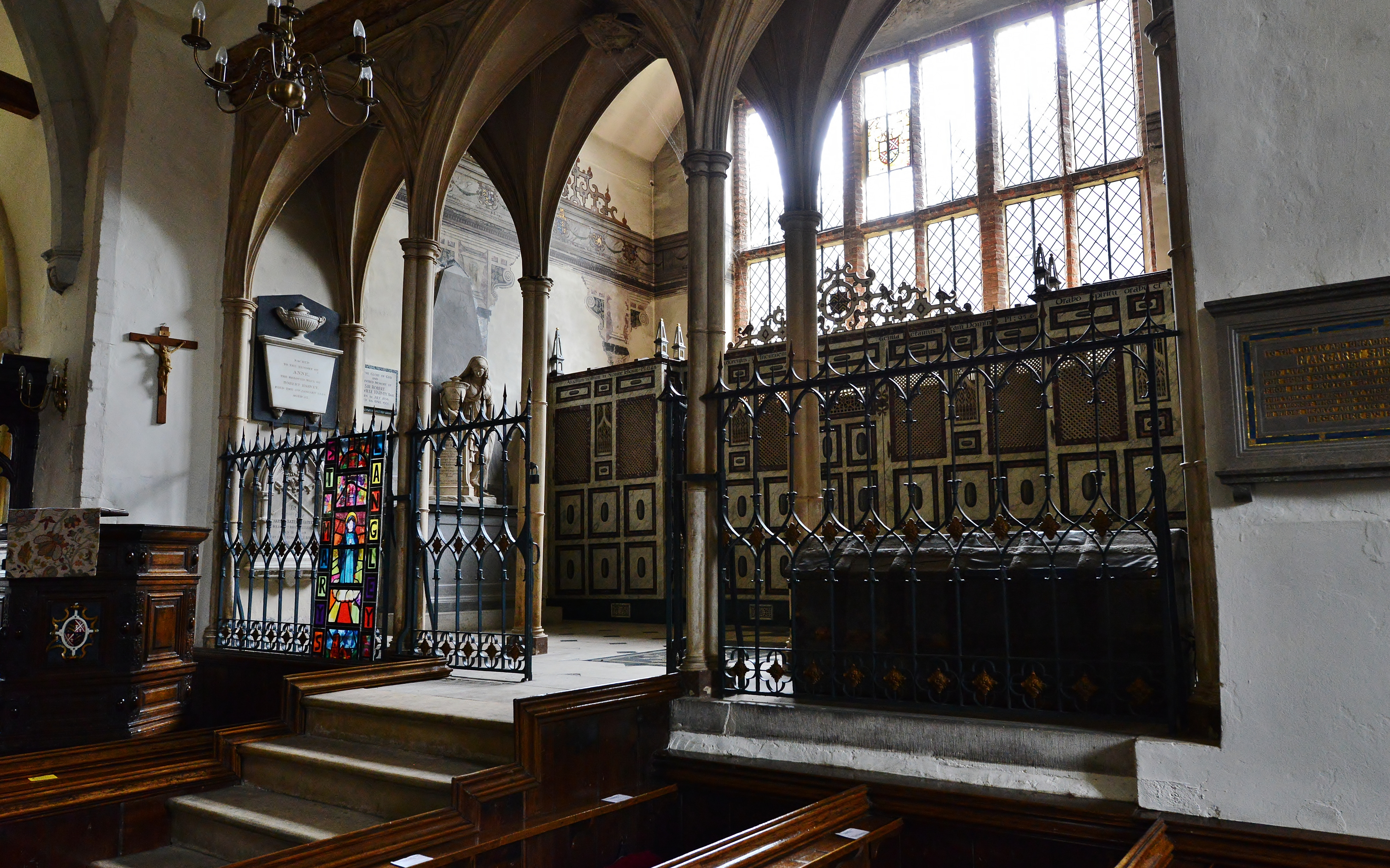

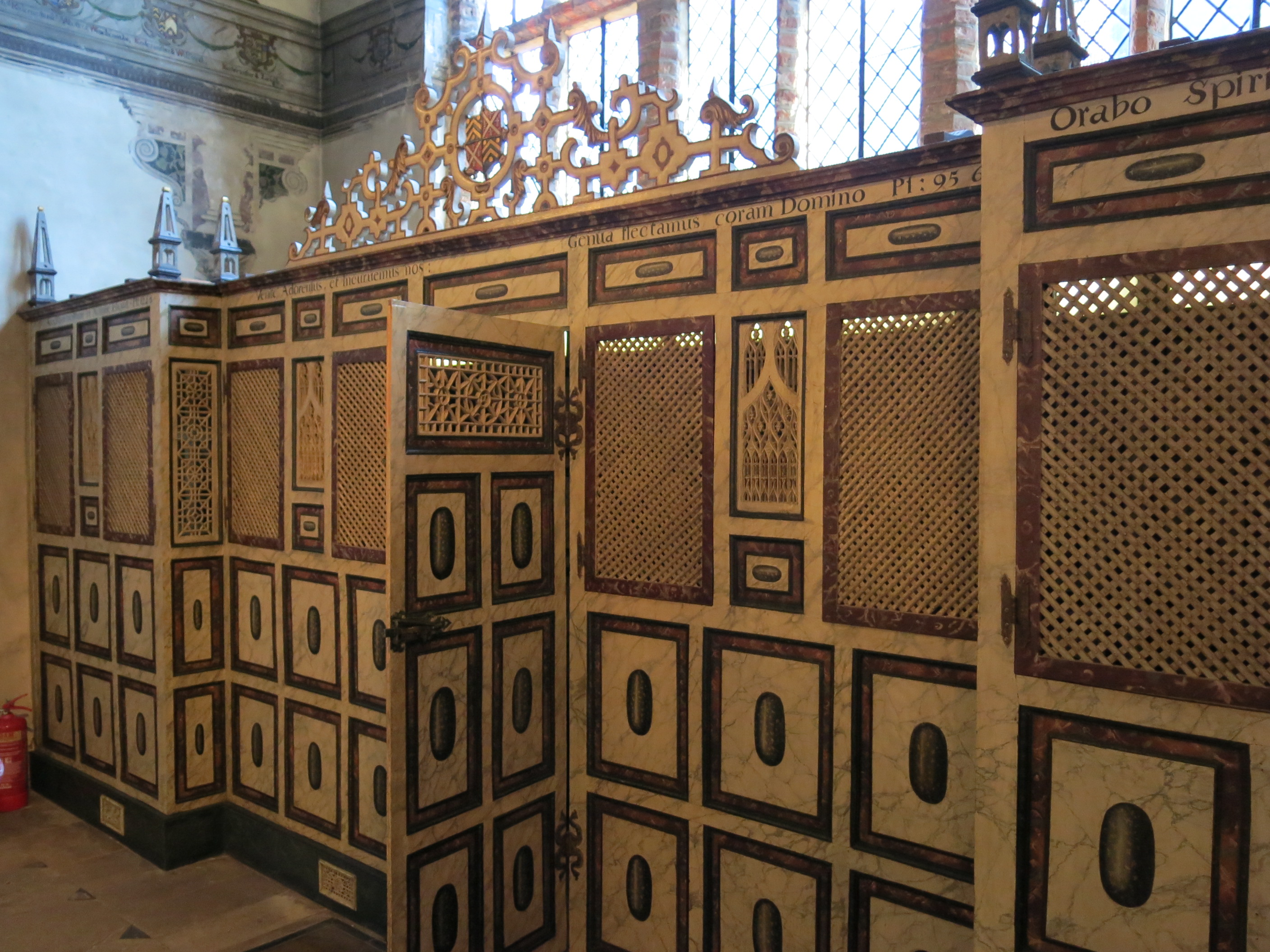

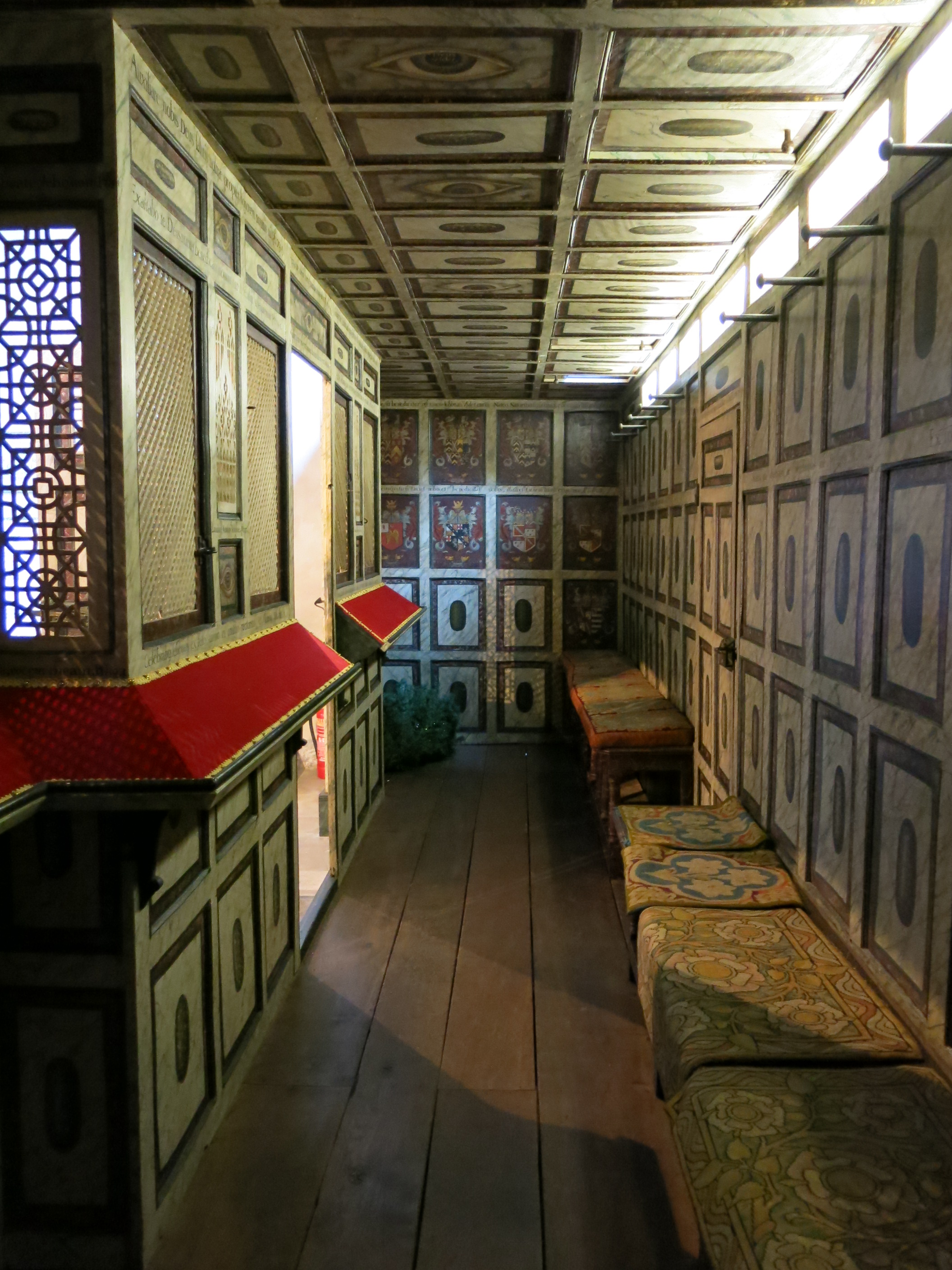

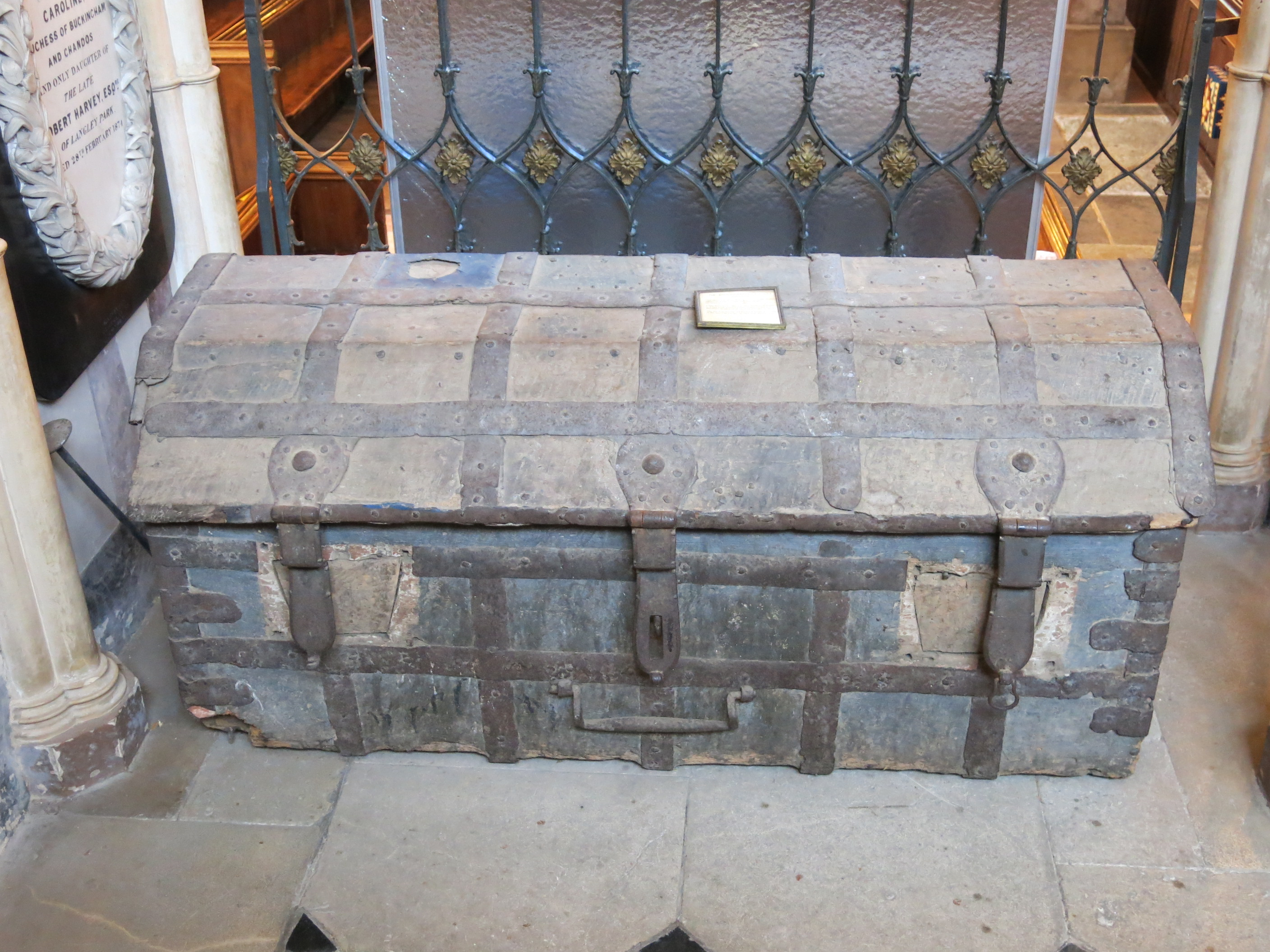
