= Traveling library =

A traveling library is a collection of books lent for stated periods by a central library to a branch library, club, or other organization or, in some instances, to an individual. The chief characteristics from which it derives its name are its temporary location in the place to which the collections of books is sent and the implication that any traveling library will or may be changed for another collection of books. A bookmobile is an example.

== History ==
The date of the first traveling library is uncertain. Among its forerunners can be noted the itinerant chapman and ballad seller, the religious colporteur, and the camp library of Napoleon I listed in Bourrienne's Mémoires. The traveling library can also be cited as a logical outgrowth of the "circulating schools" of Wales, promoted in 1730 by Griffith Jones, and the later similar extension schools of the General Assembly of the Kirk of Scotland in the Highlands and the Scottish islands.

The first really practicable traveling library plan seems to have been started by Samuel Brown in East Lothian, Scotland, in 1817, though it is stated that the principle had been used with some Scottish parish libraries as early as 1810. Brown procured 200 selected volumes "about two-thirds of which were of a moral and religious tendency, while the remainder comprised books of travel, agriculture, the mechanical arts and popular sciences." Four libraries of 50 volumes each were stationed in Aberlady, Saltoun, Tyninghame and Garvald. In 20 years these libraries had increased to 3,850 volumes, distributed through 47 villages. Jean Frédéric Oberlin is said to have founded itinerant libraries in his parish of Waldersbach in the Vosges Mountains at about the same time that the East Lothian libraries were established. Both of these early plans barely survived their founders.

A successful system of traveling libraries was begun by the public library of Melbourne in 1860. It was officially named the Duplicate Book Loan System. Oxford University in 1878 and Cambridge University soon after began to send out traveling libraries as an aid to their university extension courses.

=== United States ===
The cheapness and quickness of modern methods of communication has been like a growth of wings, so that a thousand things which were thought to belong like trees in one place may travel about like birds.

— Melvil Dewey, 1901
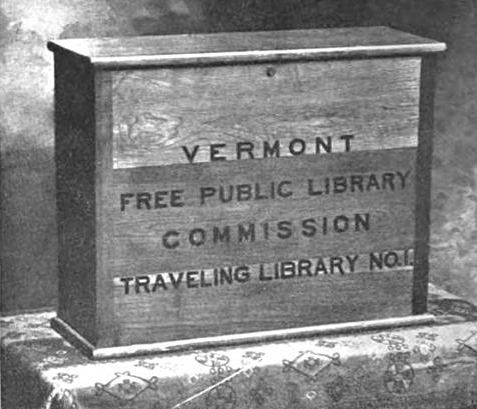
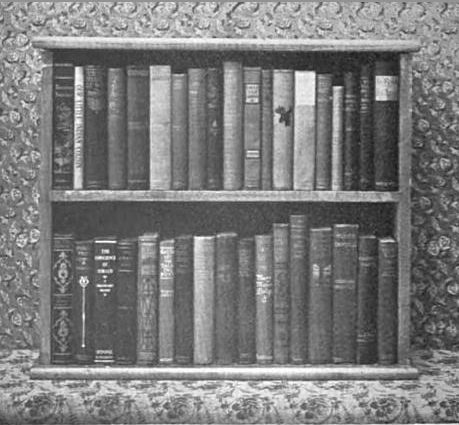
Box containing "Traveling Library No.1," created by the Vermont Free Public Library Commission, 1901

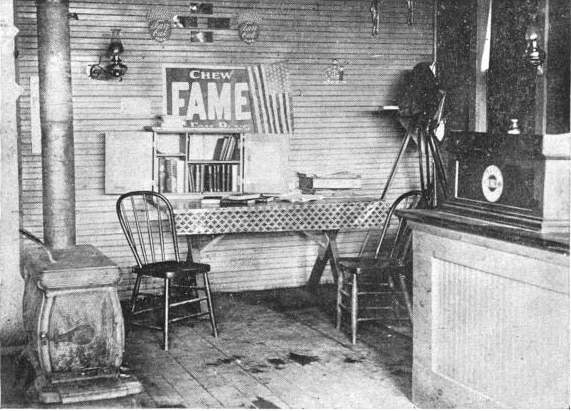
Library box set up in a shop, Wisconsin, 1890s

In the United States, the lyceum movement demonstrated the need of libraries to conserve the results of its work. "Itinerating libraries" and a county system of traveling libraries were proposed as early as 1831. In 1848, the American Seaman's Friend Society began to furnish libraries to American ships, afterward extending its work to naval hospitals and life-saving stations. The United States government has supplied similar libraries to lighthouses. These were exchanged frequently. The first general American traveling libraries supported by public funds were authorized by the New York State Legislature in 1892. The first library was sent out by the New York State Library, and created in part from Melvil Dewey, in February 1893. Beginning with 10 libraries of 100 volumes each the circulation for the first fiscal year was 2,400 volumes. This increased in 1918-19 to a total circulation of 43,958 volumes sent out in 1,099 different collections, with a total stock of 100,641 volumes. Michigan and Montana enacted traveling-library legislation in 1895 and Wisconsin and Iowa in 1896. There were also some commercial traveling libraries such as those provided by the H. Parmelee Library Company which was founded in Iowa in 1882. It developed a rotating "package" collection which it called the University of the Traveling Library. The company continued to market its rotating package library as a way of providing, "A Thoroughly Equipped and Permanent Library In every Town and Hamlet in America", after relocating to Chicago in 1898.

== Description ==
A typical system in New York State provided seven different types of traveling libraries:

1. house libraries for the individual or the single family, preferably in rural homes
2. libraries for children
3. libraries for foreigners, in several foreign languages
4. libraries for general readers
5. libraries for public schools, to supplement the school libraries but not to provide supplementary readers or textbooks
6. libraries for small public libraries, to supplement local library collections where library funds are scanty
7. libraries for study clubs, granges, private schools, Sunday schools, churches, etc.

The collections were of two types: fixed and open shelf. Fixed traveling libraries are lent as a unit and the borrower is allowed no substitutions for titles on the list. Open shelf traveling libraries are selected from the general collection of the extension department to meet, as far as possible, the specific desires of the organization or person borrowing the library. The fixed collection is more economical as it ensures the use of the whole collection; the open shelf collection is more flexible and, therefore, more satisfactory to most people. The tendency is toward the open shelf collection.

A variant of the traveling library is the bookmobile or mobile library, which delivers books along definite routes radiating from some central library.

The great advantages of the traveling library are economy, mobility, and adaptability. The collection is limited to books definitely chosen for some purpose. The obsolete and useless are eliminated. The frequent change of collections gives each group or community receiving the libraries access to the volumes in all the groups. Books on timely topics or those needed to meet changes in community taste can in this way be provided at a minimum cost. The traveling library can be put into the home, the store, or wherever people congregate. It is not limited to any one place. No permanent building or special assistant is needed to make it give fairly satisfactory service if intelligence in selection is shown by the library which issues it. The only records needed are the simplest types of lending records.

The traveling library is of special significance in four different directions:

1. in providing the rural population and special organisations with library facilities
2. in aiding the rural schools to keep their instruction abreast of the times
3. in promoting educational extension movements of all lands
4. in promoting the establishment and development of permanent libraries

The factory and the machine shop, the social club, and the fraternal organization also find it much to their advantage to have immediately at hand a small, well-chosen collection of books changed often enough to prevent their becoming stale.

== For school libraries ==
The rapid and extensive changes in school curricula and the modern methods of teaching, most of which imply considerable use of material outside the textbook, make the school library more than ever an essential part of a school. The rural and small town schools, no less than the schools in the large cities, need fresh books in their libraries. In most cases the funds available for this purpose are inadequate. The traveling library sent by a library commission, a department of education, or other central agency can fill this need better and at less expense than the local school board. It can supply the books needed to supplement the standard books, the reference books, and the supplementary readers and textbooks which the school must have as a permanent part of its equipment. In many cases, the traveling library will show whether or not the desired book is really needed permanently.

== For educational extension ==
Practically every well-devised scheme of educational extension, whether lyceum movement, university extension, study club, correspondence course, Chautauqua movement or Sunday school, has recognized the need of a small library to conserve and amplify the results of the instruction. The traveling library has demonstrated its value in these cases. It has made it possible for the educational work to be varied in subject. It has enabled the ambitious student to go far beyond the limits of the lecture or the prescribed textbook. It has made true Thomas Carlyle's statement, "The true university of these days is a collection of books."

== For library culture ==
Many pioneer settlers who migrated from the eastern states to Kansas lacked books. These settlers were missing the literary societies, lyceums, and libraries that Kansas lacked. Many people traveled miles to attend lyceums or listen to debates. Literary societies were viewed as just as essential as having a church. Women’s clubs began forming in a number of settlements. Women’s clubs filled the void for intimate friendships and provided educational opportunities. Women’s clubs in the east also worked to prevent disease, decrease ignorance, and fight poverty. Western women settlers thought one of their roles was to civilize or reform the new society they were forming in Kansas. In February 1897, activist and leader of a women’s club, Lucy Johnston helped develop a system of traveling libraries in Kansas after she heard about a traveling library in Ohio. Lucy Johnston stated, “…I thought if we could have a few books, donated by the women who had plenty, we might in some way get them carried out to the women who had none.” A fellow leader stated it was a brilliant idea and Johnston was appointed the head of the traveling library project in Kansas. The Kansas traveling libraries goals were to re-create the literary culture that was left behind in the eastern states. It was revealed in letters that at the beginning of the traveling libraries program, many women stated that they yearned for books. This limited access to books was also experienced further west. By 1904, clubwomen were credited for the establishment of traveling libraries in at least 31 states.

Another pioneer of traveling libraries was Lutie Stearns. Stearns is credited with starting more than fifteen hundred traveling library stations, as well as helping to organize thirty county cooperative library systems and one hundred fifty permanent library buildings in Wisconsin from 1895-1914. She often hand delivered the traveling libraries to both farm and industrial communities herself, traveling by stagecoach, train and even sleigh. Stearns was inspired to create a traveling library system in Wisconsin after attending Melvil Dewey’s American Library Associate presentation about the traveling library system he founded in New York. She believed that everyone should be able to have access to books regardless of age, gender or economic status. Her traveling libraries were sent to rural areas for up to six months at a time before they were replaced with new collections. Most of the collections were meant for general public use, however there were special collections made specifically for places such as orphanages, lumber camps and sanatoriums in addition to foreign language collections. Each traveling library was made up of thirty, fifty or one hundred volumes that were kept in an enclosed bookcase with a record book of loans, copies of the library rules, blank borrowing sheets and everything needed to set up the library wherever it was needed. Many of the traveling libraries were kept in farmhouses, railway stations, small stores and post offices. The information collected from the libraries helped to inform Stearns how to improve and grow the traveling library collections for the future.

== Other types of traveling libraries ==
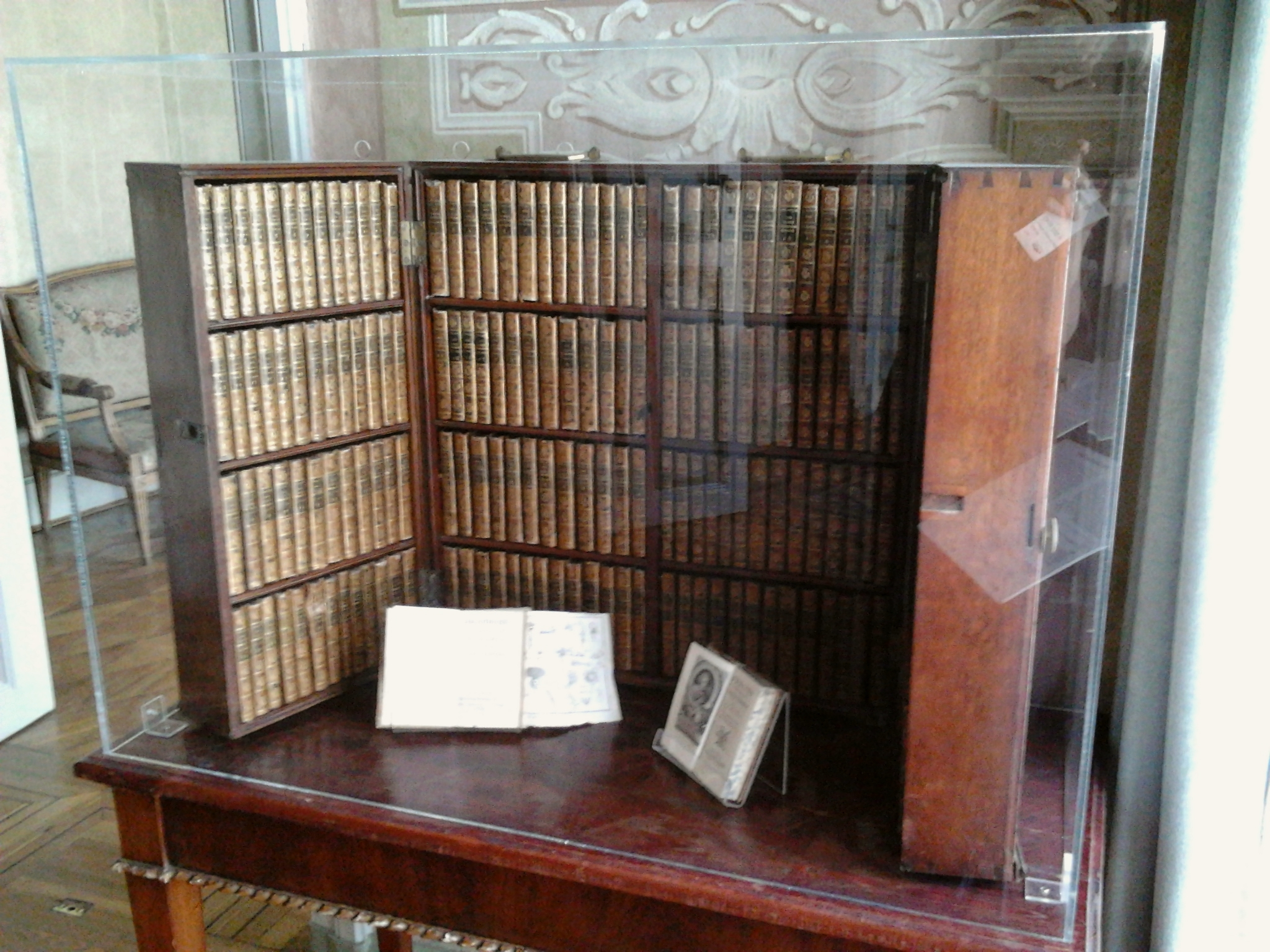
Countess Batowska's traveling library; Myślewicki Palace, Royal Baths Museum; 2nd half of the 18th century

Another type of traveling library is a box or small bookcase containing small books for the use of a traveler. Believed to be one of the first versions of the traveling library is the 17th-century Jacobean traveling library. The beautifully crafted wooden case created to house a miniature book collection was most likely commissioned by lawyer, and member of Parliament, William Hakewell in 1617 as New Year's gift for a friend. According to the University of Leeds, Shaped in the form of a large book, the case houses 50 smaller books, creating a portable, traveling library.

There are further examples in the collections of Leeds University Library, the British Library (Sir Julius Caesar's travelling library), the Huntington Library and the Toledo Museum of Art, Ohio.

== See also ==
- Digital library
- Pack Horse Library Project
