= Chained library =

Library where the books are attached to their bookcase by a chain

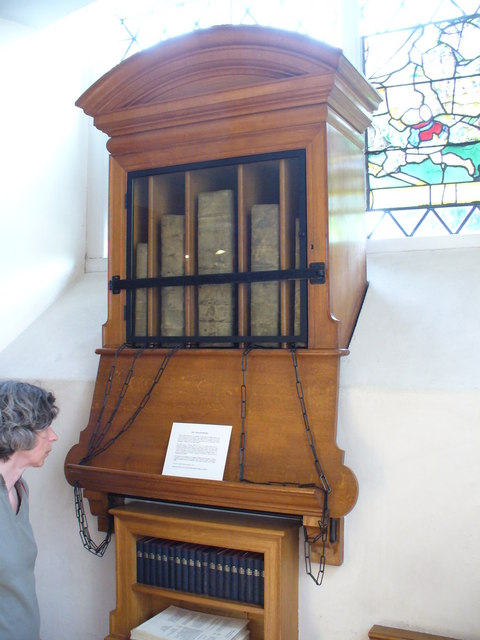
Chained Library, Chelsea Old Church. Unique in London churches, a medieval library, containing a "Vinegar Bible" of 1717. These were a gift of Sir Hans Sloane.

A chained library is a library where the books are attached to their bookcase by a chain, which is long enough to allow the books to be taken from their shelves and read, but not removed from the library itself. The practice was usual for reference libraries (that is, the vast majority of libraries) from the Middle Ages to around the 18th century. This would prevent theft of the library's materials. Since the chaining process was also expensive, it was not used on all books. Instead, only the more valuable books, such as reference works or large books in a collection, were chained. Librarians in the Middle Ages often invoked curses as well to keep books from being stolen. One such curse written into a book was:

Steal not this book my honest friend
For fear the gallows should be your end,
And when you die the Lord will say
And where's the book you stole away?

It is standard for chained libraries to have the chain fitted to the corner or cover of a book. This is because if the chain were to be placed on the spine the book would suffer greater wear from the stress of moving it on and off the shelf. Because of the location of the chain attached to the book (via a ringlet) the books are housed with their spine facing away from the reader, with only the pages' fore-edges visible. This is so that each book can be removed and opened without needing to be turned around, hence avoiding tangling its chain. To remove the book from the chain, the librarian would use a key.

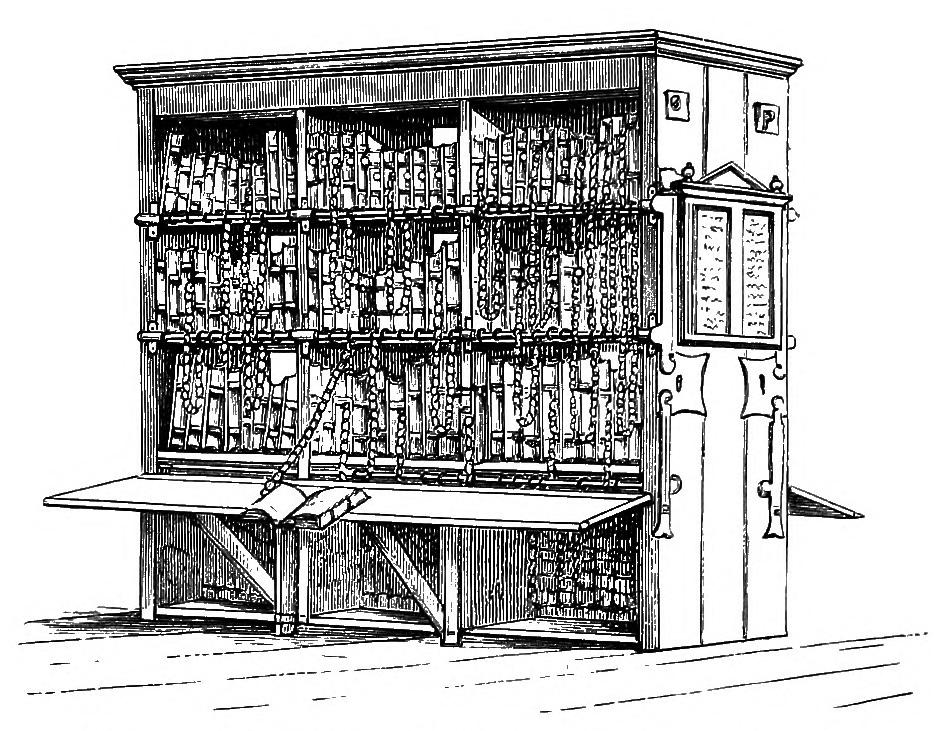
Chained library in Hereford Cathedral

The earliest example in England of a library to be endowed for use outside an institution such as a school or college was the Francis Trigge Chained Library in Grantham, Lincolnshire, established in 1598. The library still exists and can justifiably claim to be the forerunner of later public library systems. Marsh's Library in Dublin, built 1701, is another non-institutional library which is still housed in its original building. Here it was not the books that were chained, but rather the readers were locked into cages to prevent rare volumes from 'wandering'. There is also an example of a chained library in the Royal Grammar School, Guildford, as well as at Bolton School. Hereford Cathedral has the largest surviving chained library. While chaining books was a popular practice throughout Europe, it was not used in all libraries. The practice of chaining library books became less popular as printing increased and books became less expensive. Wimborne Minster in Dorset, England is yet another example of a chained library. It is one of the first in England and the second (demoted to third after Wells Cathedral chained library re-chained a number of their books) largest. It dates from 1868 and has 150 titles wrapped in lambskin. Another interesting example of a chained library is Florence's sixteenth-century Laurentian Library, designed by Michelangelo for Lorenzo de' Medici.

Hereford Cathedral, in Hereford, England, has one of two chained libraries that still have chained books on its shelves. The books in this library date mostly from the 12th century and are therefore handwritten as they predate the printing press. The book pages were said to be made of cowhide, wood, leaves, clay, cloth, bark, metal, and unbleached animal skin, and were written in the language of the people. Under-privileged scholars settled for columns of text bounded between boards and papyrus. Papyrus was cheaper but could easily be destroyed and written over.

In the Middle Ages, books were expensive and for the privileged, but they were highly valued. Books were the prime target for thieves and impoverished students to steal and sell. As a result, books were chained to shelves to preserve the library and the information it could provide.

== Recent interest in saving and preservation ==
Recently, there has been increased interest in reconstructing chained libraries. Worldwide, only five chained libraries have survived with their original furniture, chains, and books. This includes the library built in the Church of Saint Walpurga, located in the small town of Zutphen in the Netherlands. This library was built in 1564. The library is now part of a museum that allows visitors to tour and view the library's original books, furniture, and chains. Another chained library is the Malatestiana Library in Cesena near Bologna in Italy, dating back to the Italian Renaissance. A lot of work has gone into rebuilding and preserving these great libraries.

For example, many workers, over a decade, and massive monetary donations were spent to restore the Mappa Mundi and Chained Library museum located in Hereford, England. Built over 900 years ago, the library fell into disrepair and faced destruction. The oldest chained book found in the library is the Hereford Gospels. Written in the eighth century, it is one of 229 chained books located in this great library. The Hereford library is the largest surviving chained library with its chains and books intact. The library is now open to the public as a tourist attraction and museum.

The chained library in Wimborne Minster in Dorset is the second-largest chained library in the UK. The first donation came from Revd William Stone. These were theological books, used mainly by the clergy and therefore were not chained. When another local donor, Roger Gillingham, gave another 90 books in 1695, he insisted that the books be chained up, but also that the Library should be opened, free, for the people of the town, providing they were 'shopkeepers or the better class of person'.

== Surviving examples ==
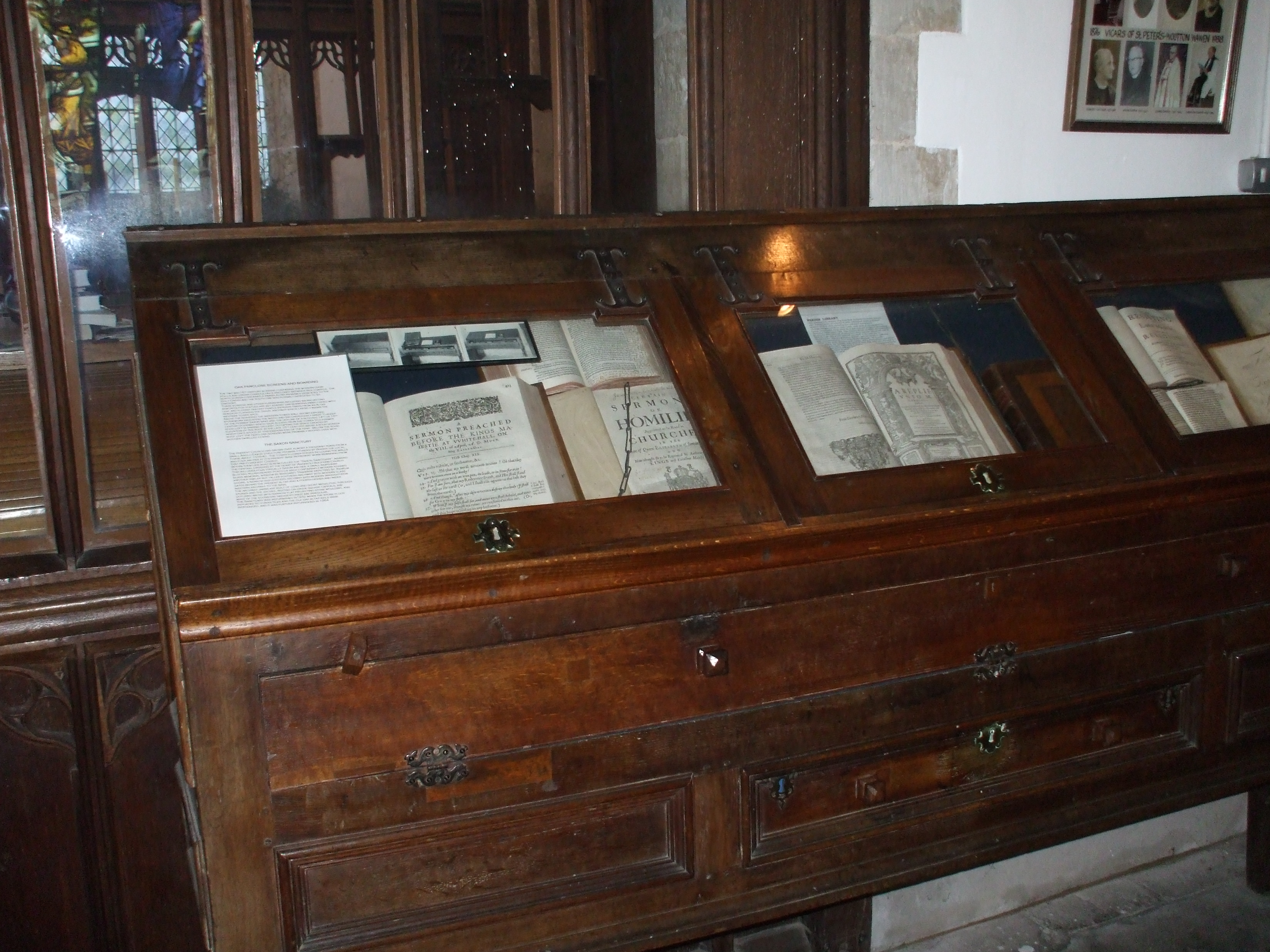
The chained books in St Peter's Church, Wootton Wawen, Warwickshire

- Basilica of St. John, Oleśnica, Poland
- Bolton School, Bolton, Greater Manchester, England
- Chelsea Old Church, London, England
- Chetham's Library, Manchester, England houses the chained parish library of Gorton
- Church of All Saints, Wrington, Somerset, England
- Church of St John the Baptist, Glastonbury, England
- Francis Trigge Chained Library, Grantham, England
- Hereford Cathedral Library, Hereford, England
- Malatestiana Library, Cesena, Italy
- Royal Grammar School, Guildford, England
- St Peter's Church, St Peter’s Church, Wootton Wawen, Warwickshire, England
- St Walburga's Church, Zutphen, The Netherlands
- Trinity Hall, Cambridge, England
- Wimborne Minster, Dorset, England
- Wells Cathedral, Somerset, England

== See also ==
- Foredge shelving
- Spine shelving

== Bibliography ==
- William Blades, Books in Chains: and other bibliographical papers. London: Elliot Stock, 1892.
- John Charles Cox & Alfred Harvey, English church furniture. Chapter XI: 'Church libraries and chained books.' Second edition. London: Methuen, 1908.
- B. H. Streeter, The Chained Library: a survey of four centuries in the evolution of the English library. London: Macmillan, 1931.
- Philippe Cordez: Le lieu du texte. Les livres enchaînés au Moyen Âge. In: Revue Mabillon 78, 2006, ISSN 0035-3620, p. 75–103.
