= Kedermister Library =

17th-century English library

Coordinates: 51.5058°N 0.5536°W

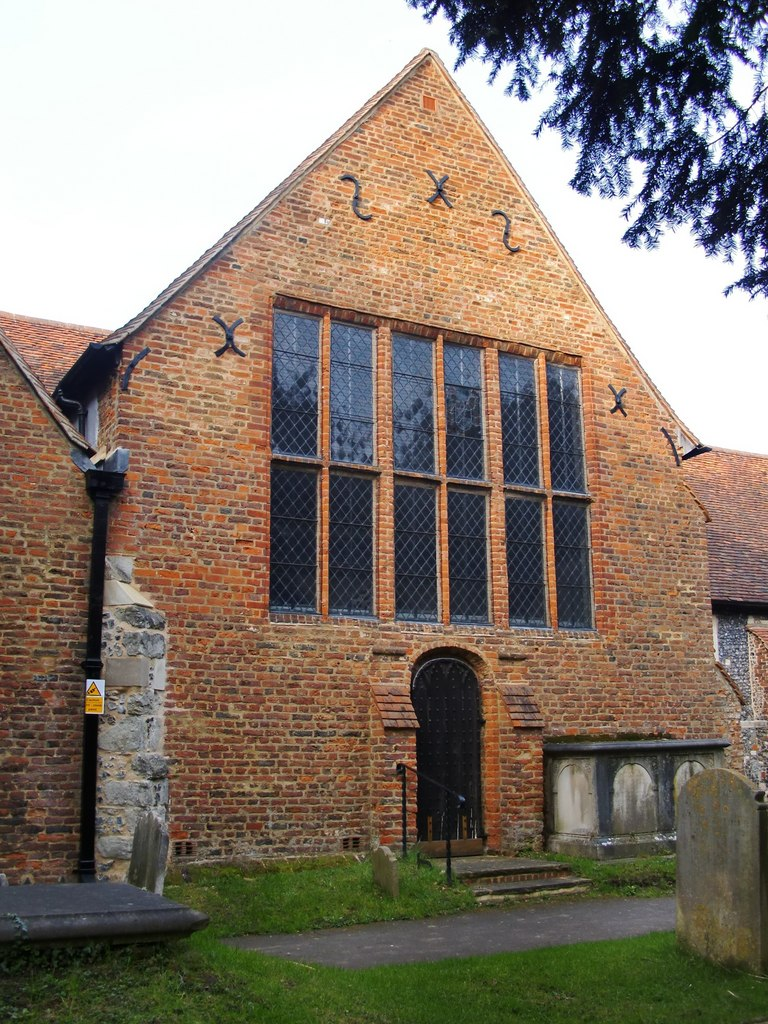
The south transept of St Mary the Virgin Church, Langley

The Kedermister Library, at Langley near Slough in the English county of Berkshire (formerly in Buckinghamshire), is a rare surviving example of an early 17th-century parish library, preserved in situ in the decorated cupboards designed for it in 1620 in St Mary the Virgin Church, Langley.

Founded around 1613 by Sir John Kedermister (d. 1631), it was established to provide for the education of the rector of St Mary's, and presented to the church in perpetuity by Sir John. The vellum catalogue, dated 1638 and listing 307 volumes, is still hanging in the library.

The library is housed in the former south porch of St Mary's Church. The room has painted panelling and trompe-l'oeil books on the inside of the shelf doors. The library and Kedermister pew still exists and, with the contemporary catalogue, provides insight into scholarship and book collecting in the 17th century. The library has two treasures: the Kedermister Gospels (an 11th-century illuminated manuscript) which is on permanent loan to the British Library and the Pharmacopolium or a booke of Medicine (a manuscript herbal of 1630) which can be seen in the Kedermister Library.

Langley, also known as Langley Marish, was in the county of Buckinghamshire until 1974, and the Kedermister Library is overseen by Buckinghamshire County Council and governed by a charitable trust. The name Kedermister is the most commonly used, though some sources, including the charity governing the library, use the spelling Kederminster.

The library is only open to the public on the first Sunday of the month from March to October, and by personal appointment any time of the year.

== Further information ==
- Jane Francis: The Kedermister Library: an account of its origins and a reconstruction of its contents and arrangement; Records of Buckinghamshire Volume 36 1994 pp. 62–85; ISSN 0967-2885

== See also ==
- Francis Trigge Chained Library
