= Foredge shelving =

Foredge shelving (or fore-edge shelving) is a book shelving technique where the foredge, i.e., the part of the book opposite the spine, rests on the shelf.

Foredge shelving may damage the spine and joints of a book. A possible reason for doing it was that leaving the spine facing up makes it easier to see the call number, which is usually located on the spine.

The Northeast Document Conservation Center (NEDCC) recommends that books should never be stored on the foredge. Instead, it is recommended that either the shelves should be rearranged to accommodate the books standing upright, or the books should be moved to other shelves that can accommodate the books standing upright.

In a historical context, fore-edge shelving means the practice of placing books on shelves with the fore-edges facing outwards.

"This was normal practice in libraries for much of the sixteenth century for two reasons. One is that writing or printing the title and author’s name on the spine was not common until the 17th century and therefore the 'back' of the book was purely functional, holding the pages together. The other is that books, like the manuscripts which preceded them, were often held securely by a chain fastened to a metal staple on the fore-edge of the wooden board."

== See also ==
- Chained library
