= Lighthouse library =

Book collection circulated in lighthouses

A lighthouse library was a traveling library issued to a lighthouse or lightship during the late nineteenth and early twentieth centuries. The libraries consisted of up to 50 books housed in a portable bookcase or cabinet which would circulate between stations every three months. Initiated in 1876 by the United States Light House Board, the practice continued into the 1930s when improvement in communication technology rendered them obsolete.

== History ==
In the late nineteenth century, there were more lighthouses than libraries in the United States. The United States Lighthouse Board, observing how lighthouse keepers "seized on any reading matter that came in their way," purchased twenty-five wooden trunks and filled them with books supplied through private donations. Noting the positive reception of lighthouse keepers, Congress sanctioned the purchase of "books for light-keepers' reading" under the Sundry Civil Appropriation Act.

From this experiment emerged a formal lighthouse library program, inaugurated in 1876 by Arnold Burges Johnson, a scientist and Chief Clerk at the United States Lighthouse Board. Its mission was to distribute small libraries to isolated lighthouses and lightships to help relieve monotony faced by keepers and their families. The libraries were intended to circulate between stations about six months, and so each contained a unique selection of books. In practice, libraries were exchanged every three months during quarterly lighthouse inspections.

The Lighthouse Board outfitted 50 libraries in the program's first year. By 1885 there were 420 lighthouse libraries in circulation. By 1889, the number had grown to 550. By 1901 the Lighthouse Board had accumulated some 3759 volumes at the general lighthouse depot in Tompkinsville, Staten Island with which to stock the circulating libraries. Some books were purchased by the Board while others were donated by the public.

in 1912, George R. Putnam, the Commissioner of Lighthouses, issued a directive to decrease the number of circulating lighthouse libraries, citing decreased cost of periodical literature and improved means of communication. Future libraries would only be issued to the most isolated stations. He also instituted a collection refresh for these libraries. He wrote to public libraries and asked them to compile six different catalogs of exactly 30 books, with the caveat to avoid any "trashy literature" as well as "books that are over the heads of the people for whom they are intended."

By 1919, lighthouse library service was suffering from lack of funds. That year, the American Library Association offered assistance, beginning by distributing left over books from the Library Service War Committee's work during World War I. Soon after, under the direction of Assistant to the ALA Director, Forrest B. Spaulding, the ALA began a large-scale program to refurbish and restock all lighthouse libraries in service, which was completed in less than a year.

It is not known exactly when lighthouse libraries were officially discontinued, but according to archival records, it was likely sometime during the 1930s.

== Description ==
Lighthouse libraries were housed in wooden bookcases made to specification by Lighthouse Board carpenters. They measured 2 feet tall, 2 feet wide, and 9.5 inches deep, with doors that opened outward. Two metal handles were mounted to the sides for carrying horizontally. A library catalog and circulation log were attached to the inside of the doors. Inside the bookcases were three shelves: two main shelves for books and bound periodicals, and a thin shelf about 1.5 inches tall, intended for two volumes of religious material, laid flat. All together, they were stocked with anywhere from 35 to 50 books. This included a selection of novels, nonfiction works, religious works, and magazines. Some libraries were stocked with children's books for keepers that requested them.

In 1916, the Lighthouse Service approved the purchase of 80 dictionaries to be distributed to select lighthouse libraries, with preference given to the most isolated stations and those with children.

== Use ==
Lighthouse keepers were required to check out books by signing the log as well as indicate the date it was returned. The Lighthouse Board intended to use circulation statistics to inform future acquisitions. A lighthouse inspector would review the log and assess the condition of the books during quarterly visits. Keepers were required to replace damaged or missing books. Books were not allowed to be lent outside the lighthouse or lightship.
