= Francis Trigge Chained Library =

Chained library in Grantham, Lincolnshire, England

Coordinates: 52.9147°N 0.6408°W

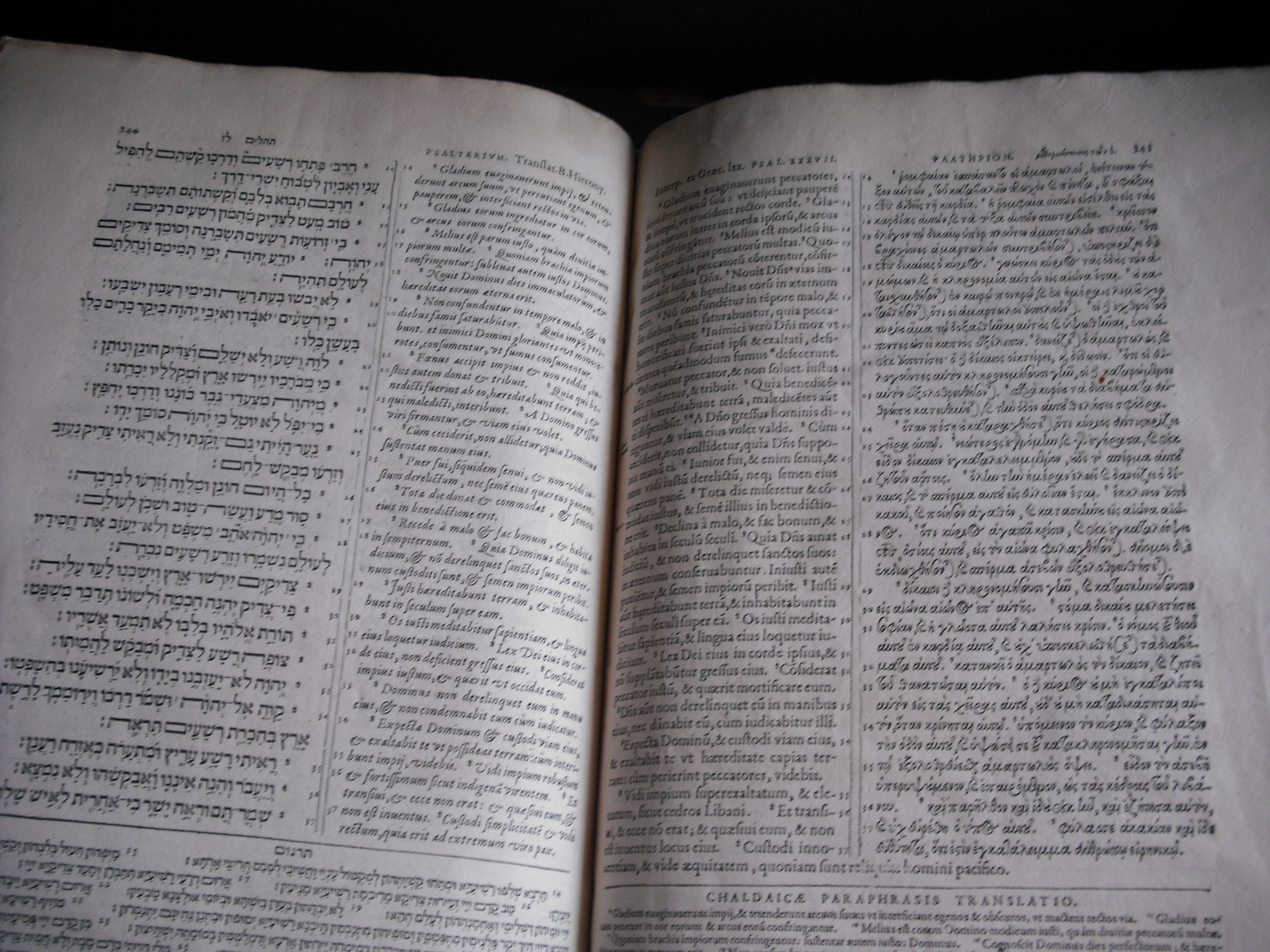
Antwerp Polyglot Bible (1569-73), edited by Arias Benedictus Montanus (1527-73)

The Francis Trigge Chained Library is a chained library in Grantham, Lincolnshire, England which was founded in 1598. Located in the parvise, over the south porch of St Wulfram's Church, it has been claimed to be the first English public library.

== History ==
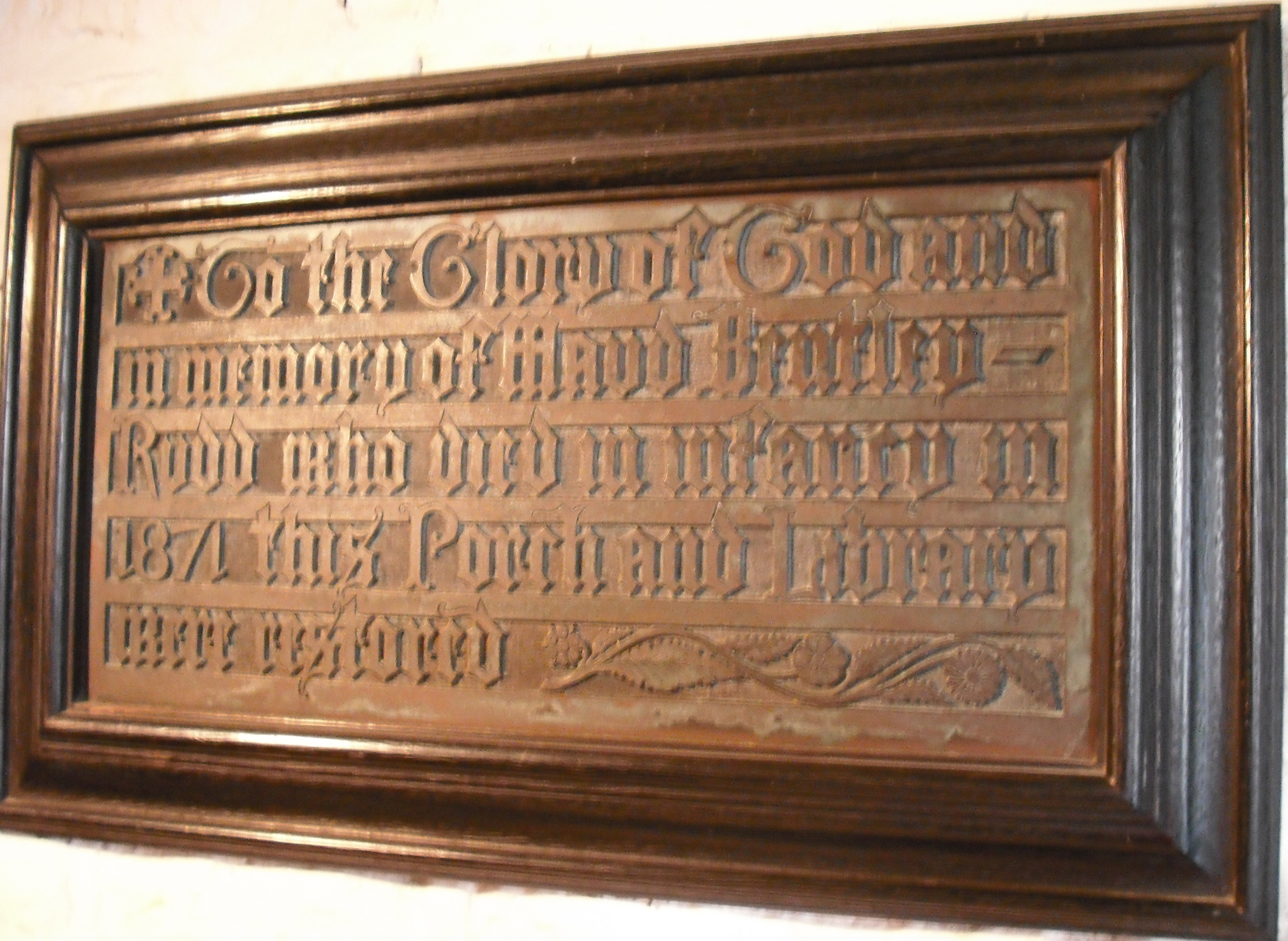
Memorial plaque to Maud Bentley-Rudd; in her memory the porch and library were restored in 1871

In 1598 Francis Trigge, Rector of Welbourn, near Leadenham in Lincolnshire, arranged for a library to be set up in the room over the south porch of St Wulfram's Church, Grantham for the use of the clergy and the inhabitants of the town and Soke. The borough was responsible for furnishing the porchroom and Trigge undertook to supply books to the value of "one hundred poundes or thereaboutes". The two vicars of North and South Grantham, together with the master of the local grammar school (now The King's School, Grantham) were to control the use of the library, and took an oath to abide by the rules. The original documents still exist and are deposited within the Lincolnshire Archives. The library was the first in England to be endowed for use outside an institution such as a school or college. It is perhaps slightly misleading to call it "the first public library" but nevertheless its use was not the prerogative of a private group.

The library has always been in the parvise over the south porch, originally the dwelling chamber of one of the vicars, with a fireplace, a small sink and an oriel window that provides a view of the nave of the church. A list of books made up in 1608 and still extant, contains 228 titles, but some of these prove to be works bound together. There are now 356 separate items catalogued. Some of these have been added over the years, including the works of the Cambridge Platonist and Cartesian Henry More, given by him during the 17th century. He was a native of Grantham and attended The King's School where, some forty years later, Isaac Newton was a pupil.

== Library contents ==
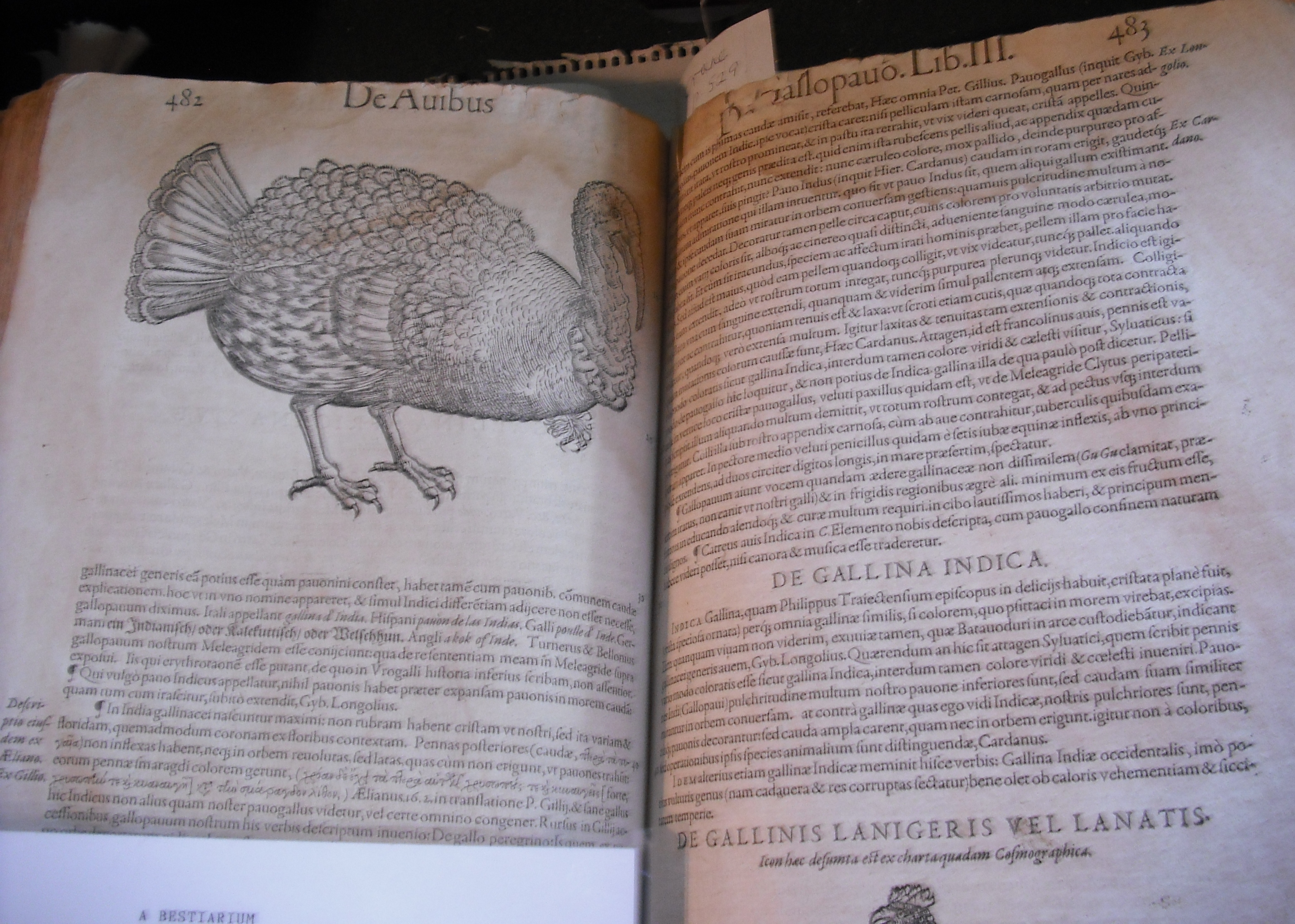
Bestiarium, by Conrad Gessner, Zurich (1587) - showing a "gallina"

Most of the books were originally chained, the chains made to a standard pattern by a local smith. They were riveted to the fore-edge of the front covers and many of them have been pulled away and lost. The 82 remaining chains run on rings along bars attached to the shelves; these attachments are modern and date from the restoration of the decaying porch room in 1884. Many of the volumes, which at that date were in a poor condition, were repaired locally between 1893 and 1894; but since the Second World War a number have been carefully renovated and rebound by professional conservators.

Canon Hector Nelson, who retired as Principal of the Lincoln Training College (now Bishop Grosseteste University) and came to live in Grantham until his death in 1896, directed the 1893 restoration.

The original books seem to have been bought in Cambridge, since there are some second-hand volumes whose provenance has been traced to that town and a number whose bindings have been linked to Cambridge binders of the 16th century. One of them, Garrett Godfrey, used his initials in the design he often stamped on the leather; another was Thomas Thomas, a binder who later became printer to the university. He probably added two of the books, which have Trigge's signature in a neat italic hand, at the time. Twenty volumes were added to the library from his own books under the terms of his will when he died in 1606.

The books were collected without much discrimination, probably by an agent sent down to Cambridge by carrier's cart. 14th-century legal cases under Roman law decided in central Italy and printed in Venice before 1500 cannot have been of much use to a provincial vicar in the Soke of Grantham in the early 17th century, although such works are now among some of the rarest items. One, printed in Naples in 1476, is the only copy recorded in any library. The volumes were probably bought in the first place because they were offered cheaply.

The theological mix is also indiscriminate. There are Lutheran propaganda, Calvinistic preaching, bitter attacks on papistry and equally bitter refutation of Protestant heresies. What survives is the whole history of the Reformation, set out in the writings of the men who brought it about or set themselves to oppose it. The collection was considered unique for the time period as it reflected the opposing ideas of the Reformation.

The collection includes:

- Medical works of Celsus, Galen and others, printed from early manuscripts in 1528.
- The four books of the Sentences of Peter Lombard (d. 1160). This was the work that began the systematic attempt to correlate faith and reason in the Middle Ages.
- The Commentaries on the Sentences, by Duns Scotus. They were written in Oxford c.1300, and argued the limitations of reason in matters of theology. This copy was printed in Venice in 1497.
- Two multivolume Histories of the Church, one from a Lutheran viewpoint and printed in Basel, the other by the Oratorian Caesar Baronius. The second was written expressly to confute the conclusions of the first.

== Library today ==
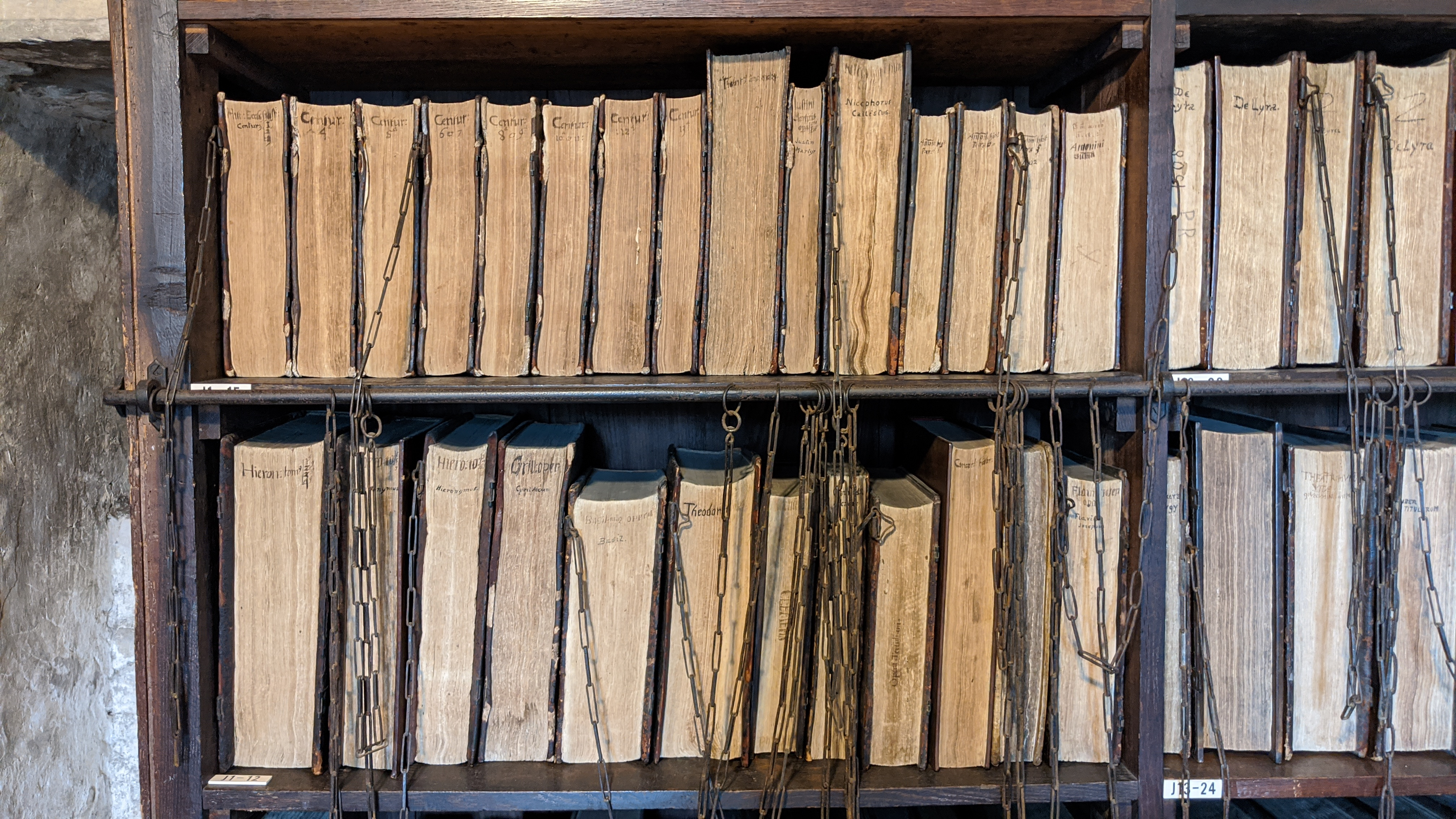
The chains in the library were cast and made in Grantham.

The library, staffed by volunteers, is open to visitors between April and the end of September. There are only 82 chains remaining in the library now, though the rods to which they attach are late Victorian, as are the shelves.

== See also ==
- Chetham's Library
- Kedermister Library
- The Samuel Hey Library, St. Mary's Church, Steeple Ashton
- Plume's Library
- Wimborne Minster Chained Library
