= John Danner =

John Danner may refer to:

- John Danner (inventor)
- John Danner (entrepreneur)
