= Leistler Bookcase =

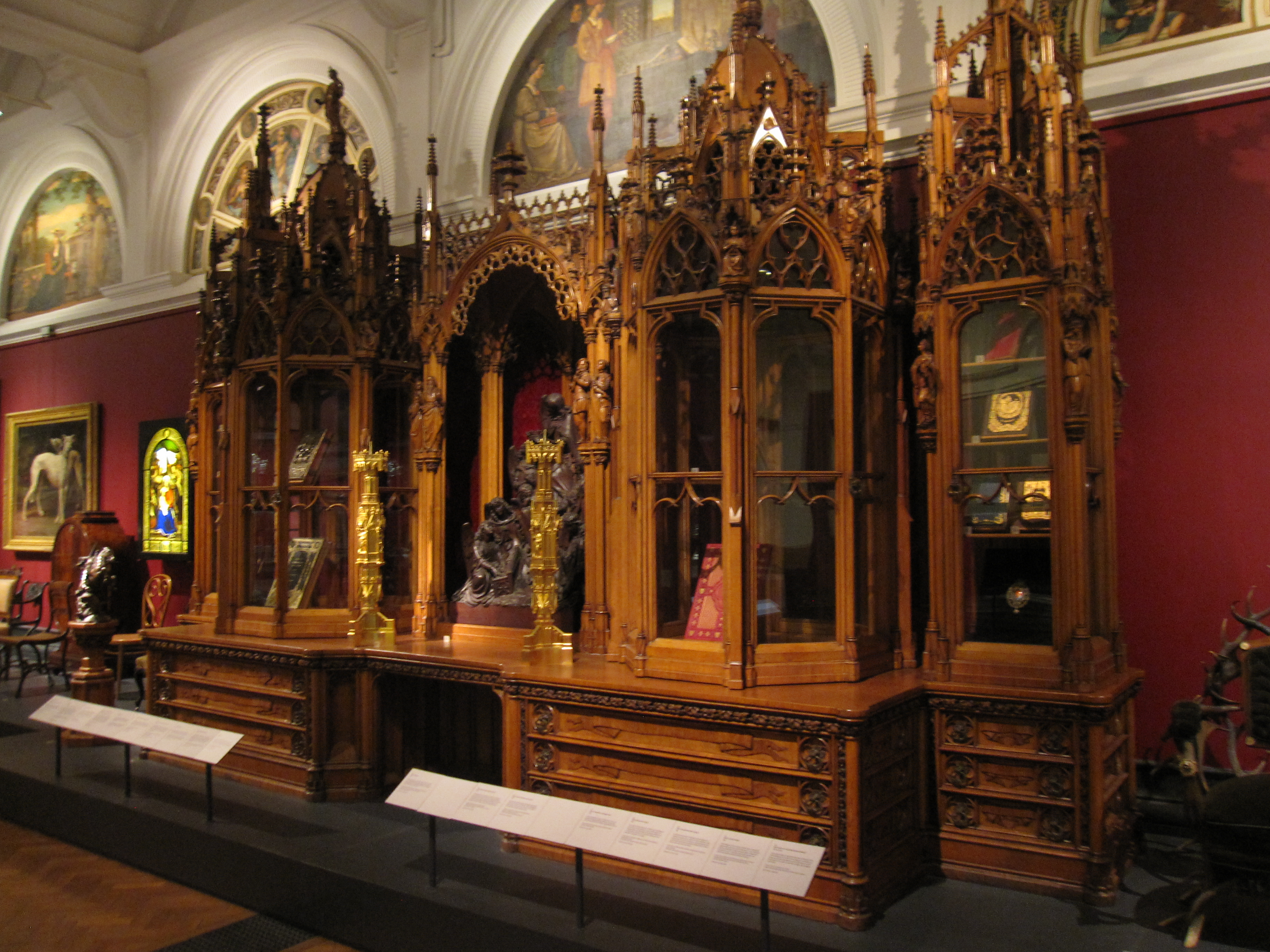
Leistler Bookcase, today at the V&A Museum

The Leistler Bookcase is a massive, historic bookcase made out of oak.

== History ==
It was produced in 1850–51. The design is by Bernardis di Bernardo, who was assisted by Josef Kranner. The bookcase was produced by the Austrian company Carl Leistler & Sohn in Vienna, Austria. It was sculpted by Anton Dominik Feinkorn and carved by Franz Maler.

The bookcase was shown at the Great Exhibition 1851 in London. Leistler's exhibits were described as "massive, bold and masculine in design, and well adapted to a palace". The bookcase, "a cathedral in wood", bears elaborate decoration that referred to current debates on the unification of the German-speaking peoples. It was presented to Queen Victoria by Emperor Franz Joseph I of Austria and installed in Buckingham Palace for Albert, Prince Consort. In 1851, in its coverage of the Great Exhibition, the Illustrated London News described the piece as "the stately carved bookcase, by Leitner, claims special attention for its elaborate and ambitious design and the careful workmanship bestowed upon it."

As tastes changed over time, it was given to the University of Edinburgh, who in turn passed it on to the Victoria & Albert Museum. It has the inventory museum no. W.12-1967.
