= Armaria =

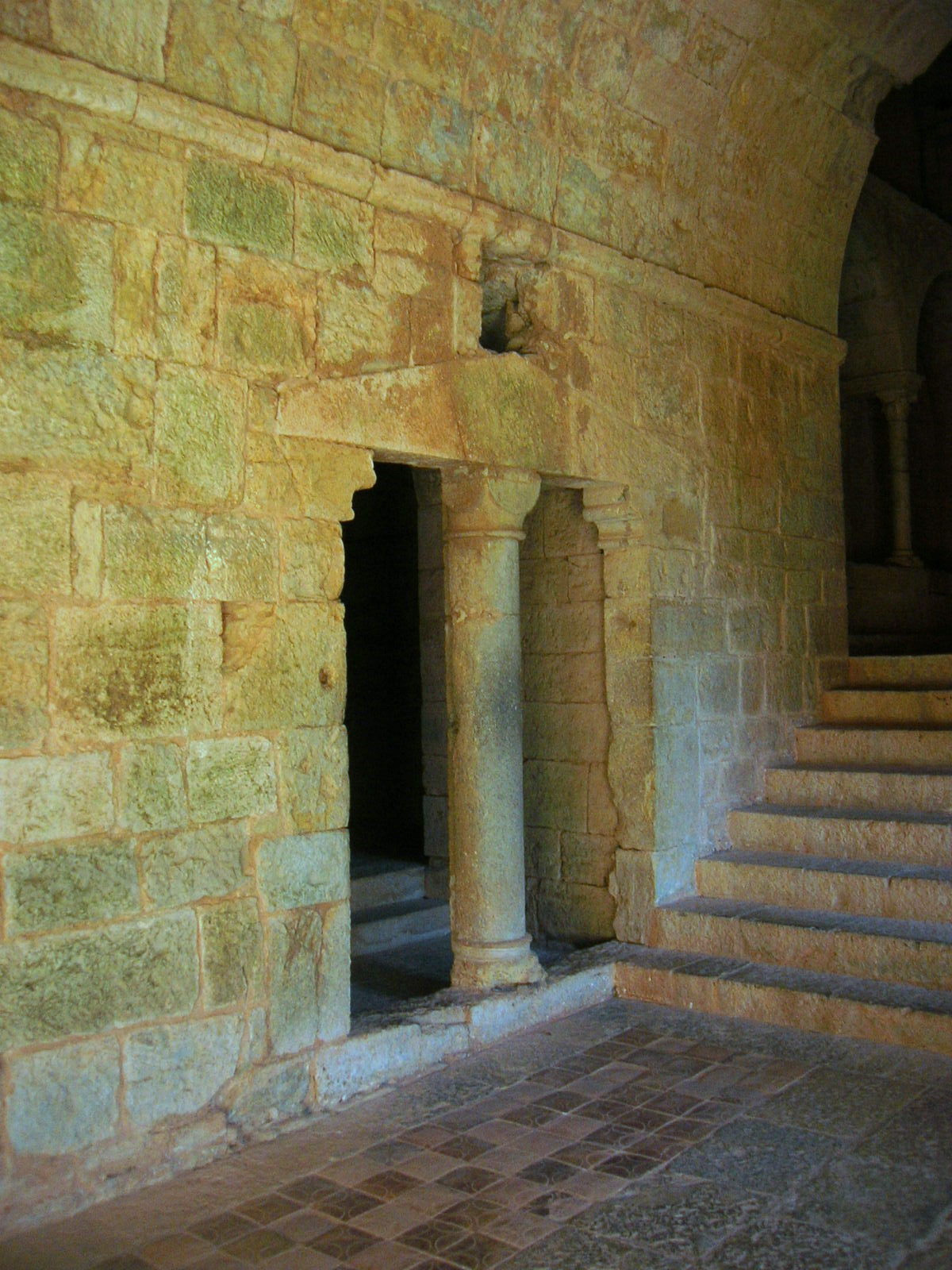
Armarium at Le Thoronet abbey in France

Armaria (singular armarium) are a kind of closed, labeled cupboards that were used for book storage from ancient history until the Middle Ages.

They were probably used in the library of Alexandria. They were also used for storage of important papal documents in the Vatican Archives.

== Usage ==
=== Religion ===
The armarium is used for storing liturgical objects, arranged in the walls of the sanctuary or the presbyterium. In monasteries, the armarium claustri is used for storing volumes. The niche is carved in a wall of the “gallery of the collatio” of the cloister, with lateral grooves intended to receive the bookshelves. The relatively modest dimensions of the original armarium-niche testify to the rarity of books in the central Middle Ages. The Carolingian renaissance leads to an increase in the number of volumes in the large abbeys, which leads to its transformation into a book store room. In ancient Cistercian architecture, it is a small room that is located between the abbey church and the chapter house and opens directly into the cloister where the books read by the monks are stored. The armarium often has an external storage cupboard, close to the entrance door of the church.

The monks who borrow these books use them for their liturgical offices or read them during lectio divina, sitting on the stone benches that line the walls of the cloister. The cantor, responsible for the armarium, must keep it closed during working hours, meals, vespers and night sleep.

The armarium is to be distinguished from the scriptorium (sometimes called library), a much larger room, and located on the other side of the cloister, which is a place of work and study: in the Middle Ages, manuscripts were diligently copied there. The scriptorium (library) often contained several thousand books and was enriched over time. All fields of knowledge were cultivated there and not only ecclesiology: books of medicine, geometry, music, astrology, and Latin classics such as Aristotle, Ovid, Horace or Plato.

=== Houses ===
The armarium is most often a wall cabinet, a common arrangement in medieval houses used for storing objects. In inventories, it does not appear as the place containing the objects mentioned. On the other hand this word often appears in price-made works of construction.
