= Cărturești Carusel =

Heritage site in Bucharest, Romania

Coordinates: 44.431892°N 26.101609°E

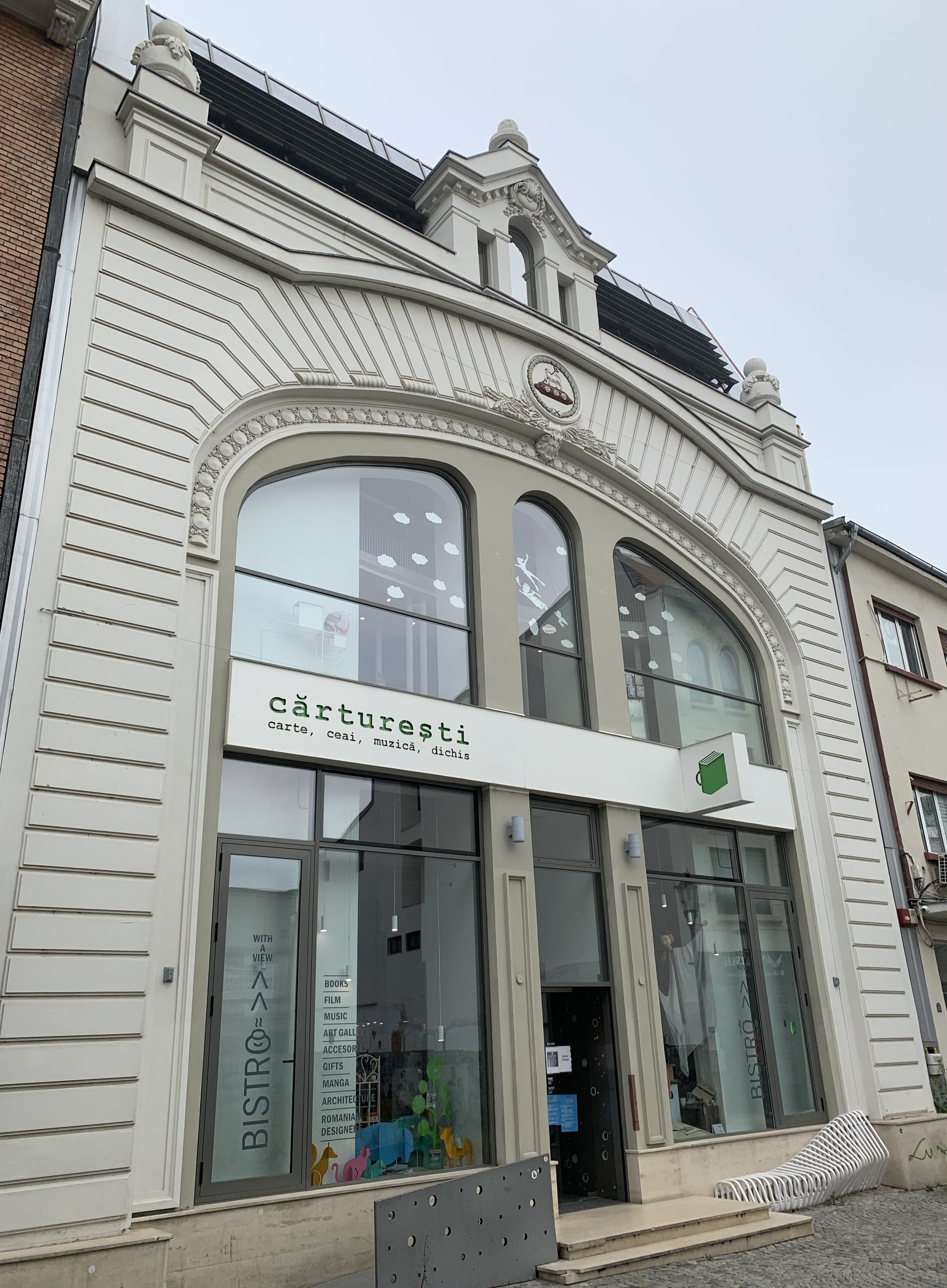
The façade

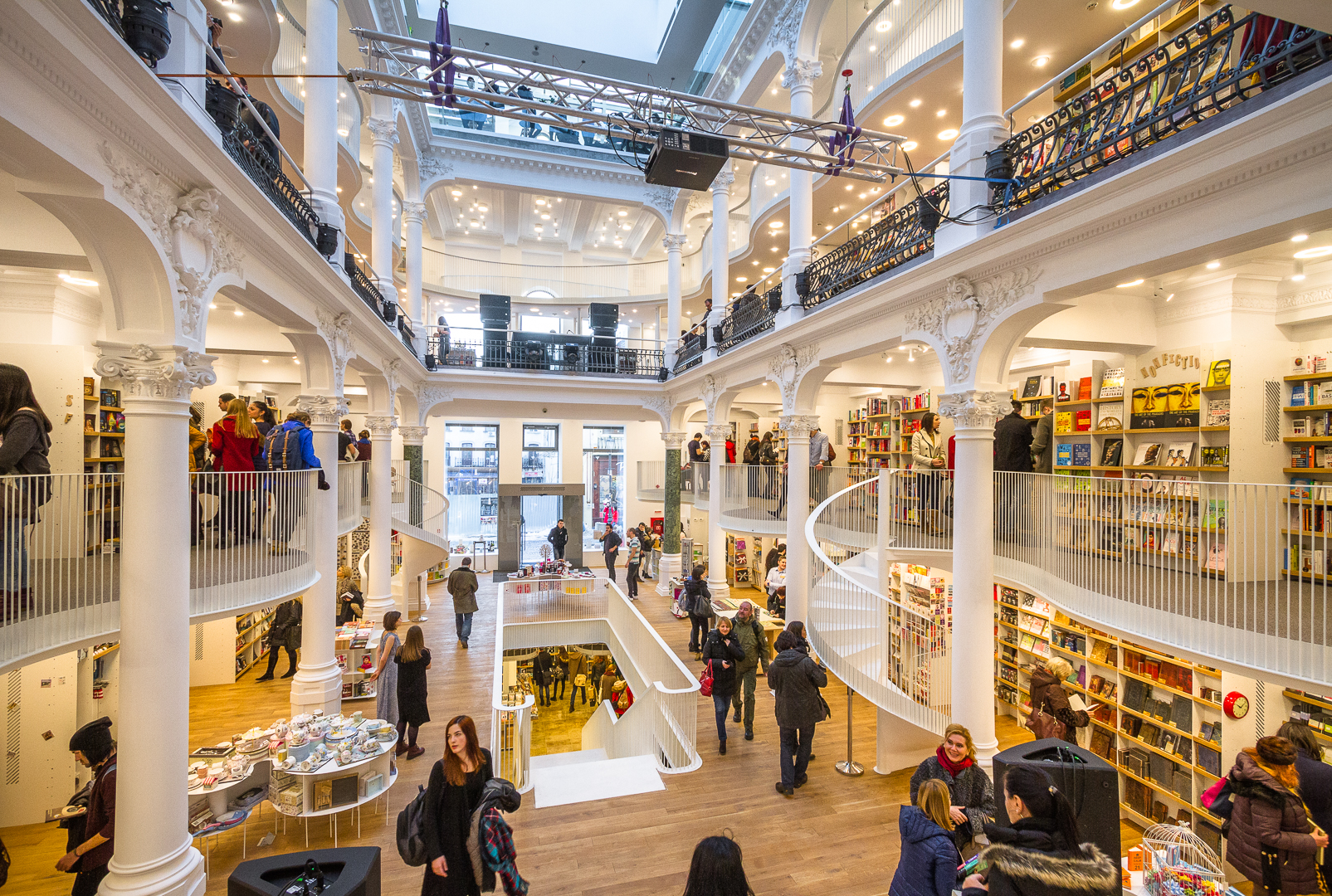
The interior

Cărturești Carusel (/kərtureʃti karusel/) is a bookstore on Lipscani 55 Street in the old town of Bucharest, Romania. It belongs to Romanian book retailer chain Cărturești

The building that currently houses the bookstore was built at the beginning of the 20th century by the Greek Phanariot Chrissoveloni bankers family. During the first few decades of its existence the building housed the Chrissoveloni Bank headquarters, and afterwards it became a general store. At the end of the 1990s and early 2000s the building fell into decay, up until 2015 when a five year long rehabilitation, strengthening and conservation project was completed.

== Gallery ==
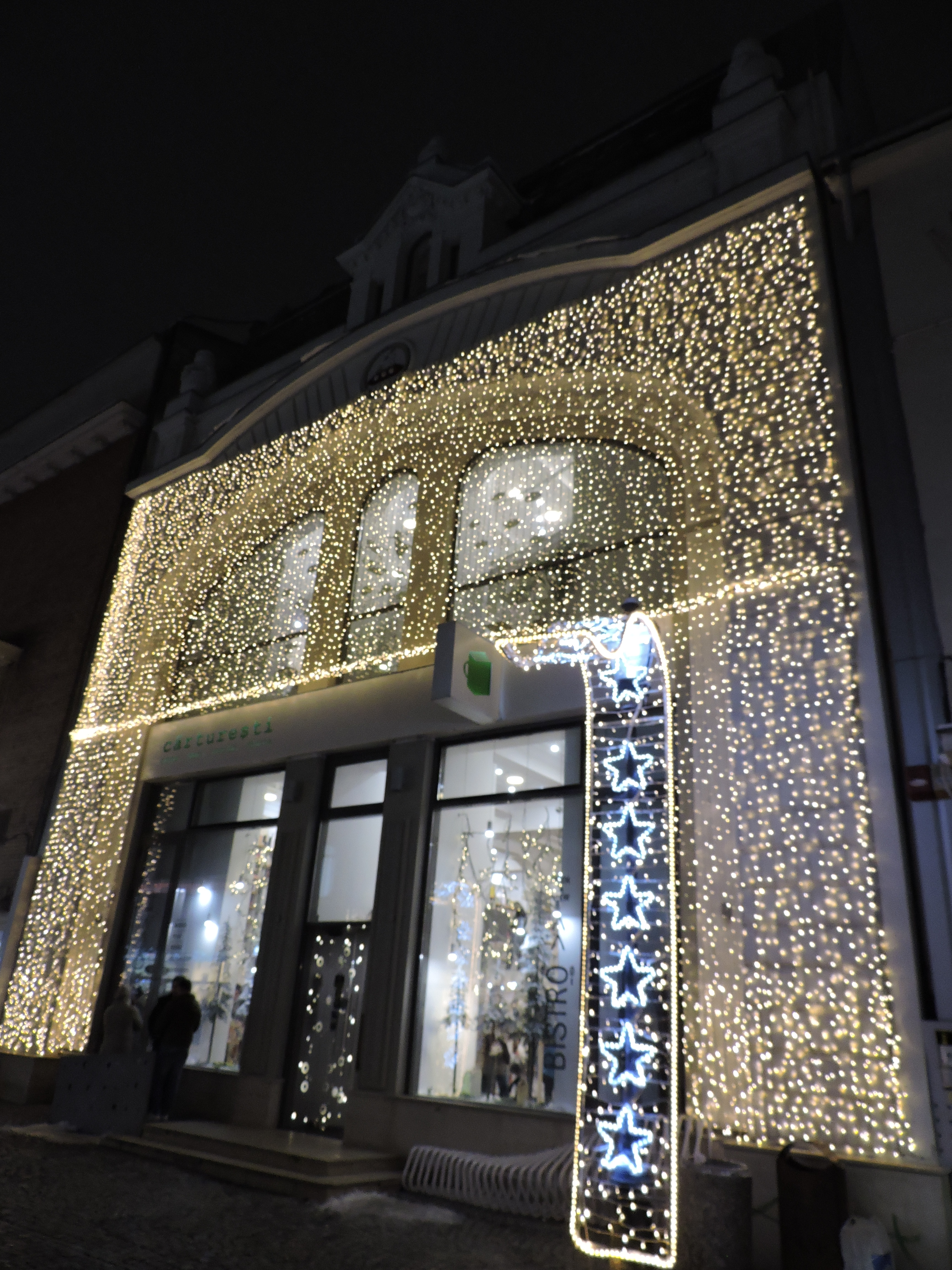
The façade in December 2018

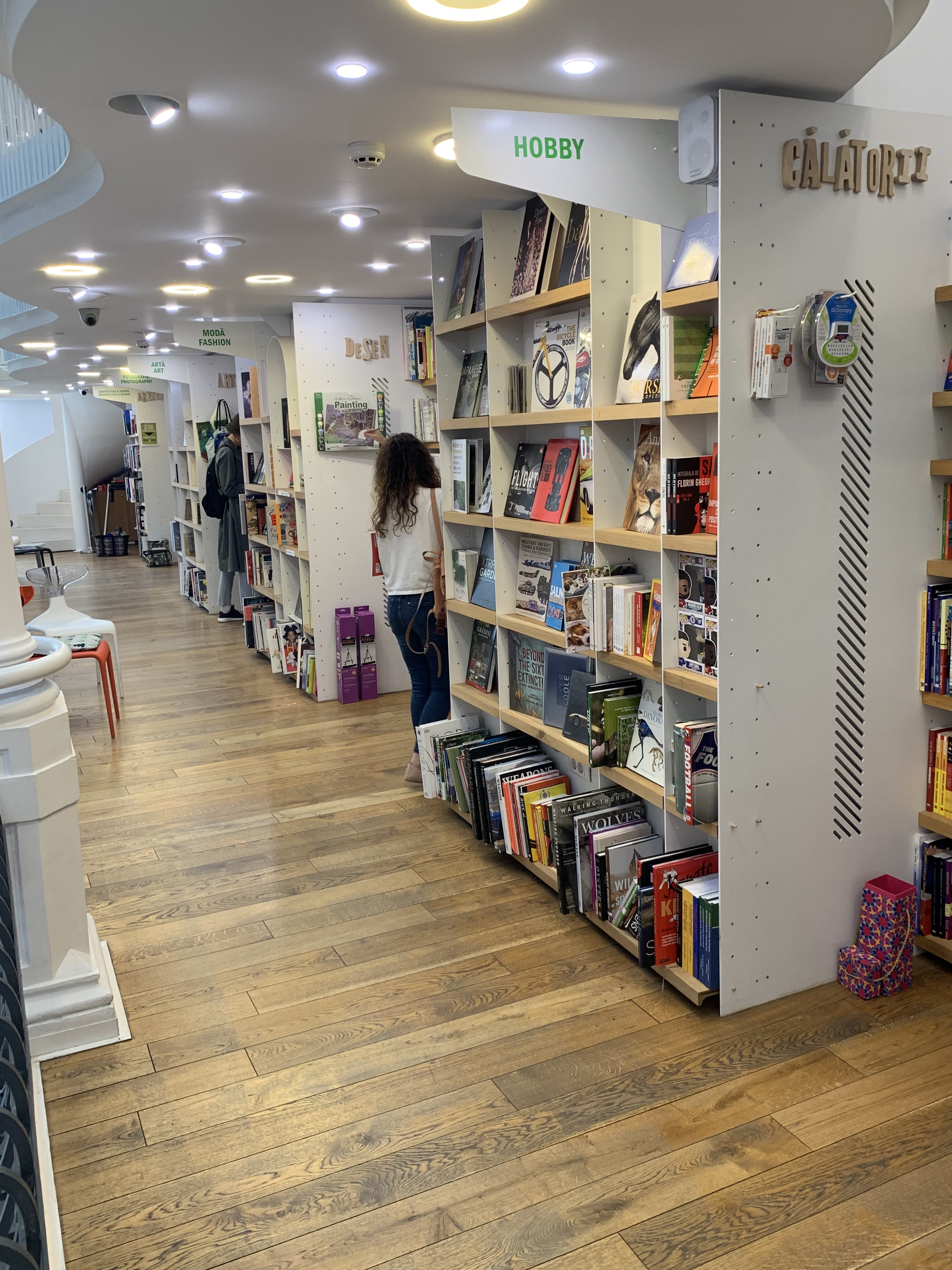
Bookshelves on the 2nd floor

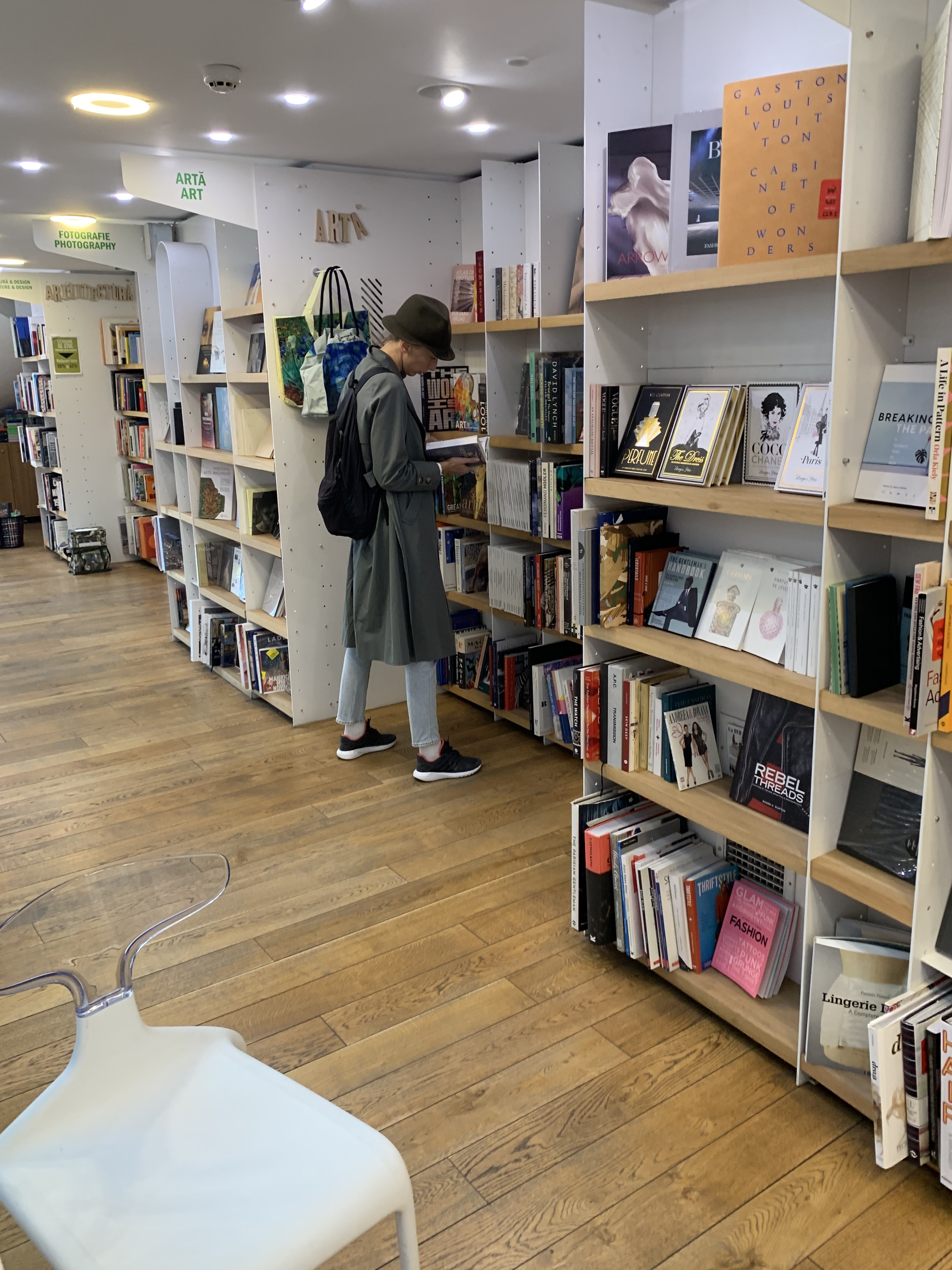
Bookshelves on the 2nd floor

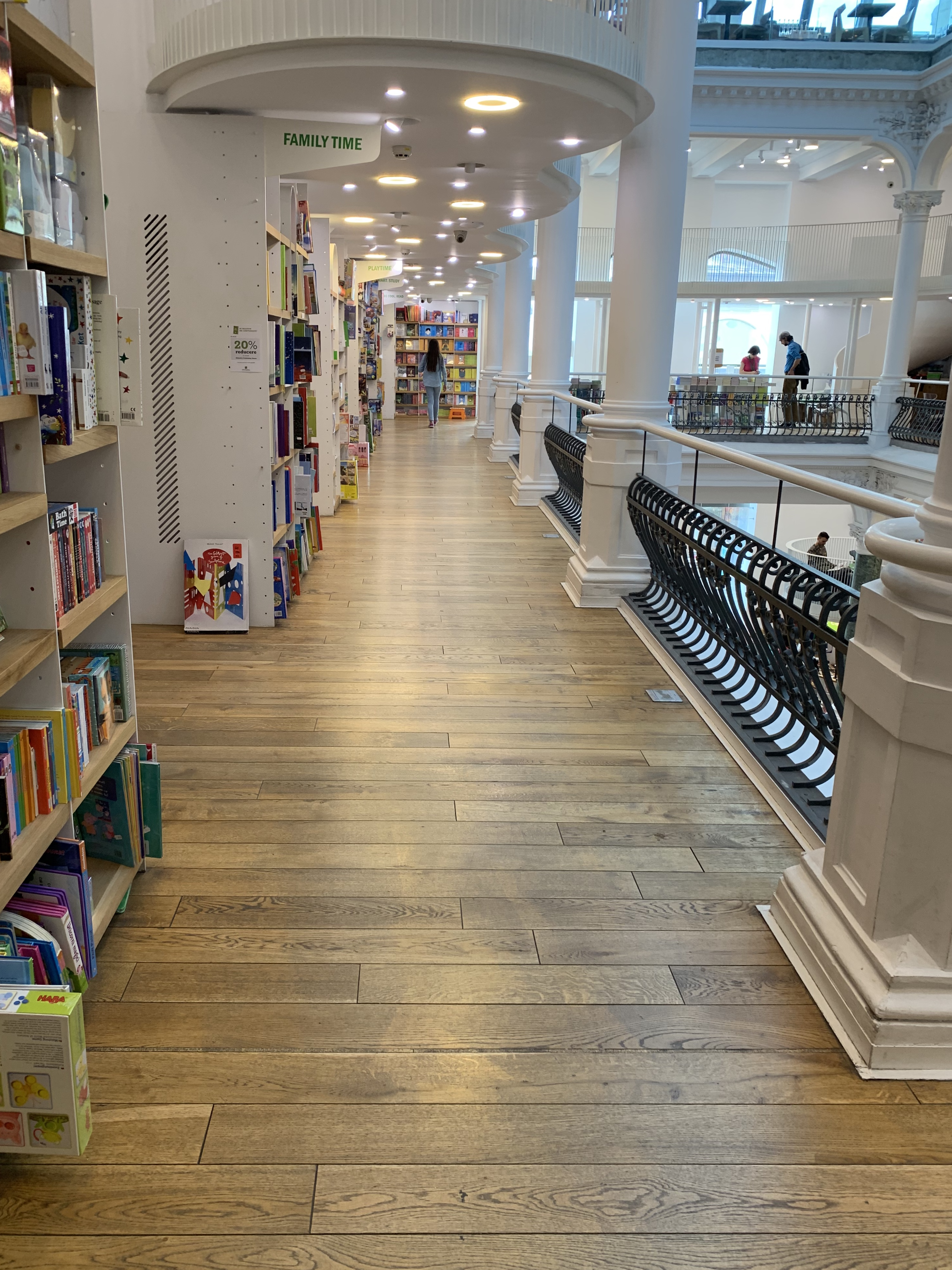
Part of the 2nd floor

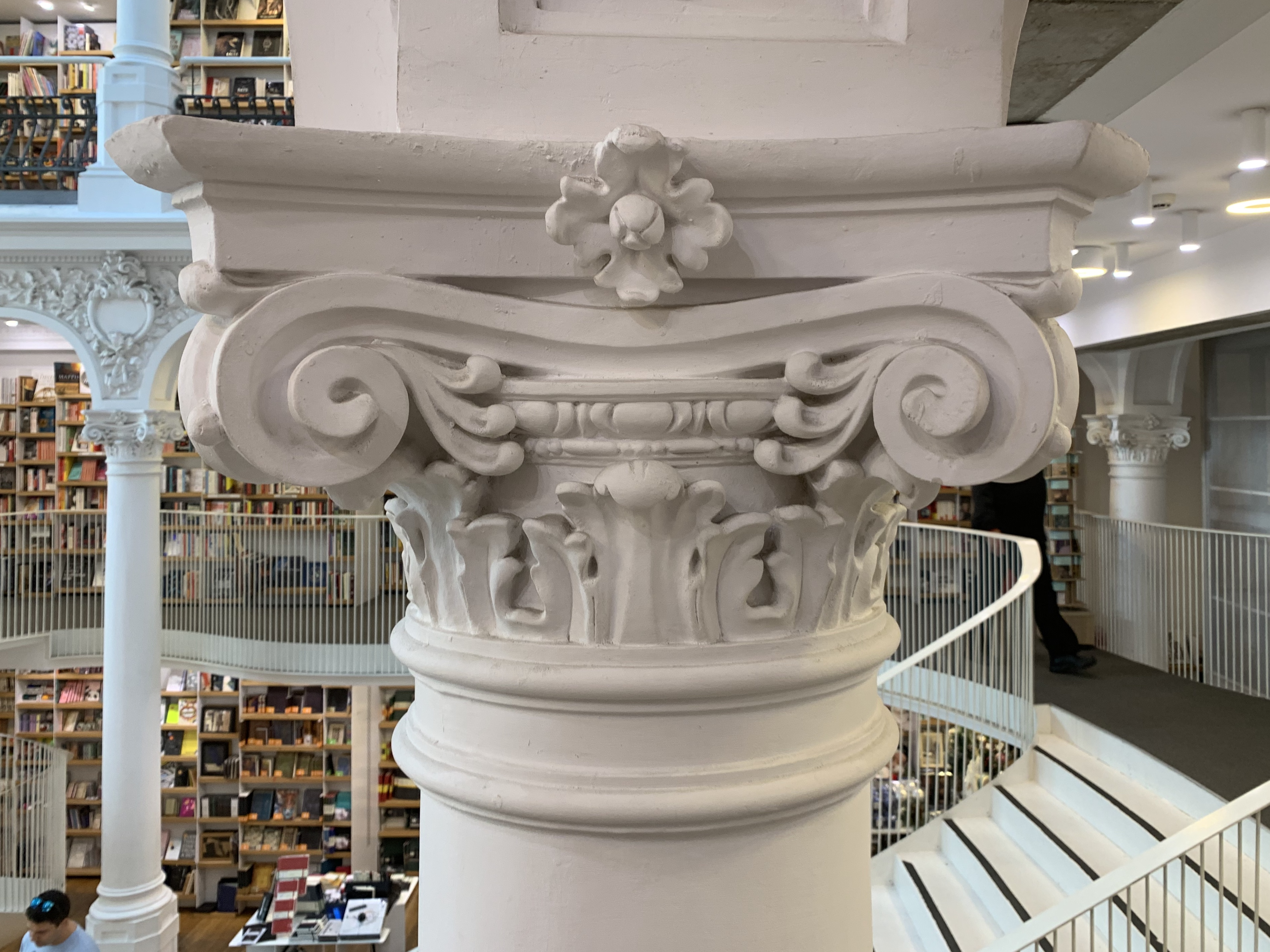
Composite capital of a column

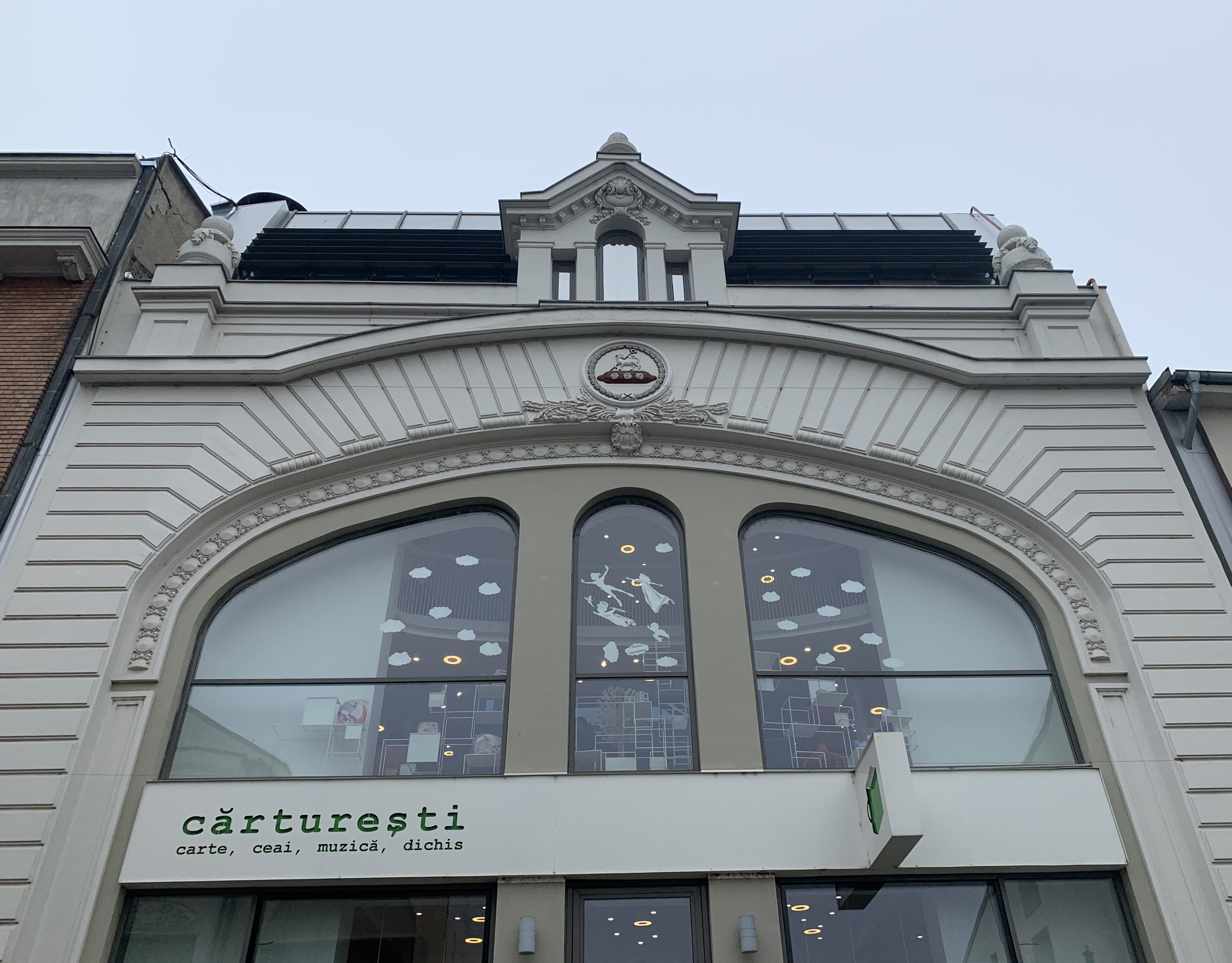
The upper part of the façade

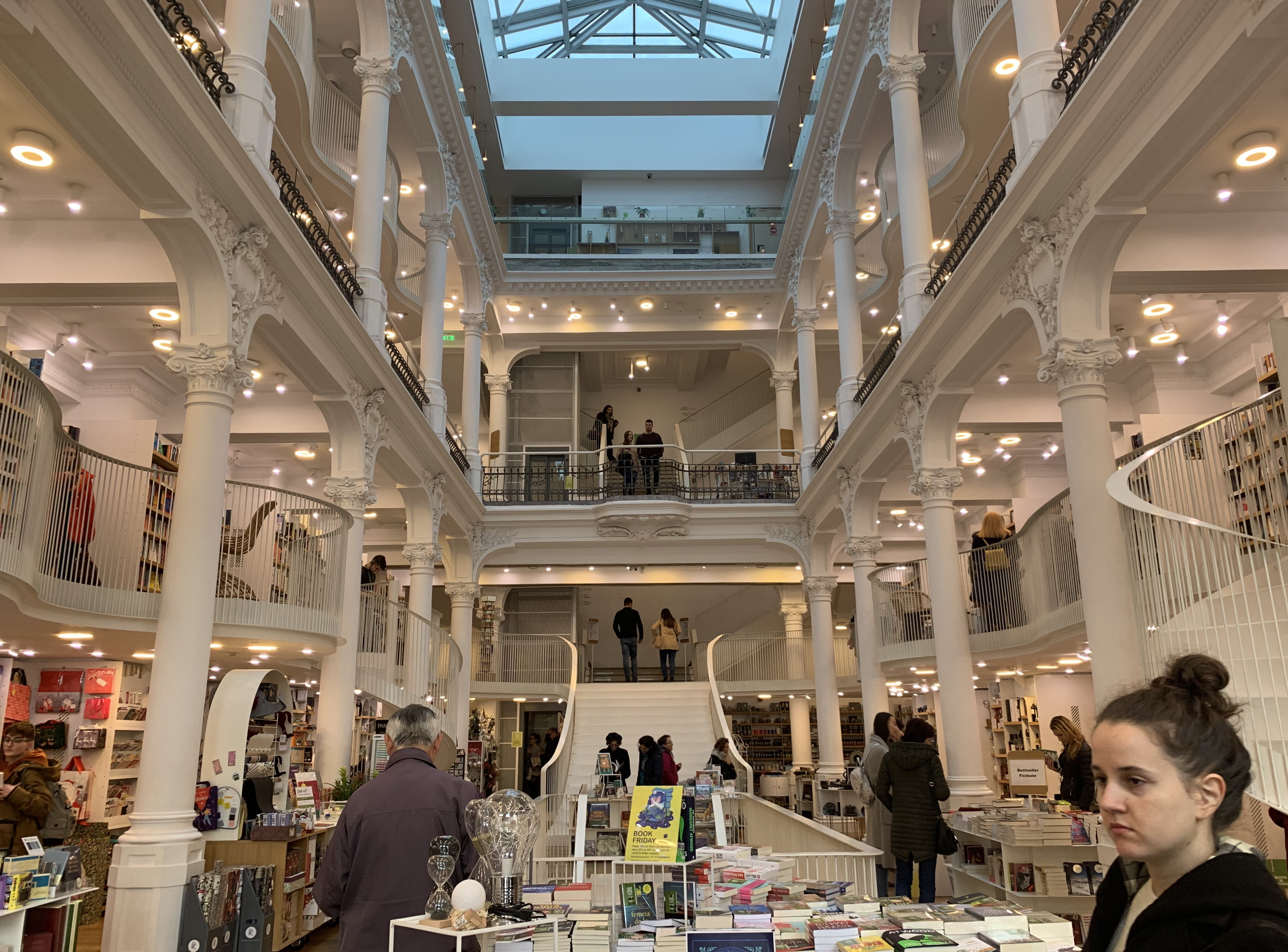
The interior

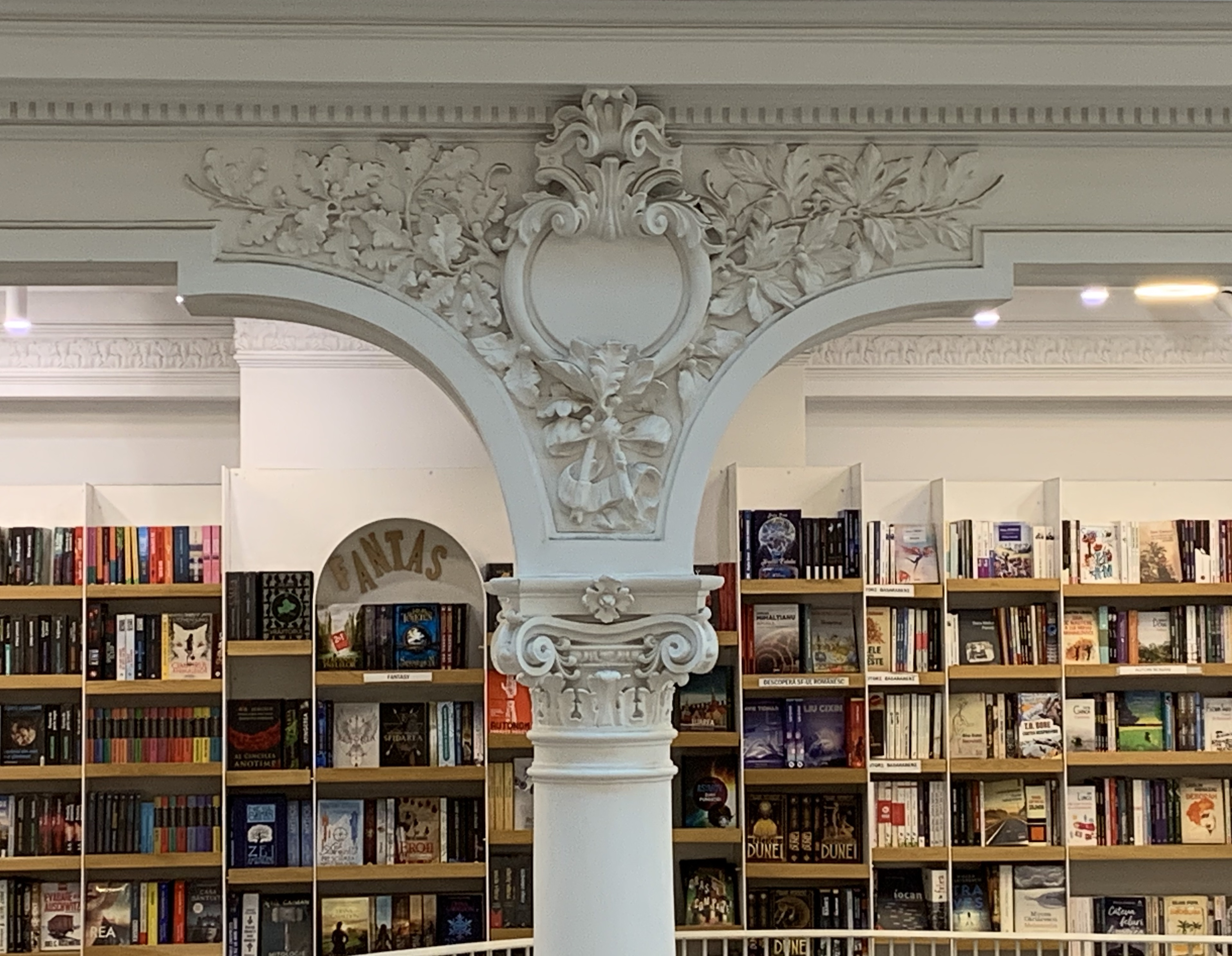
Stuccos with a cartouche and leafs

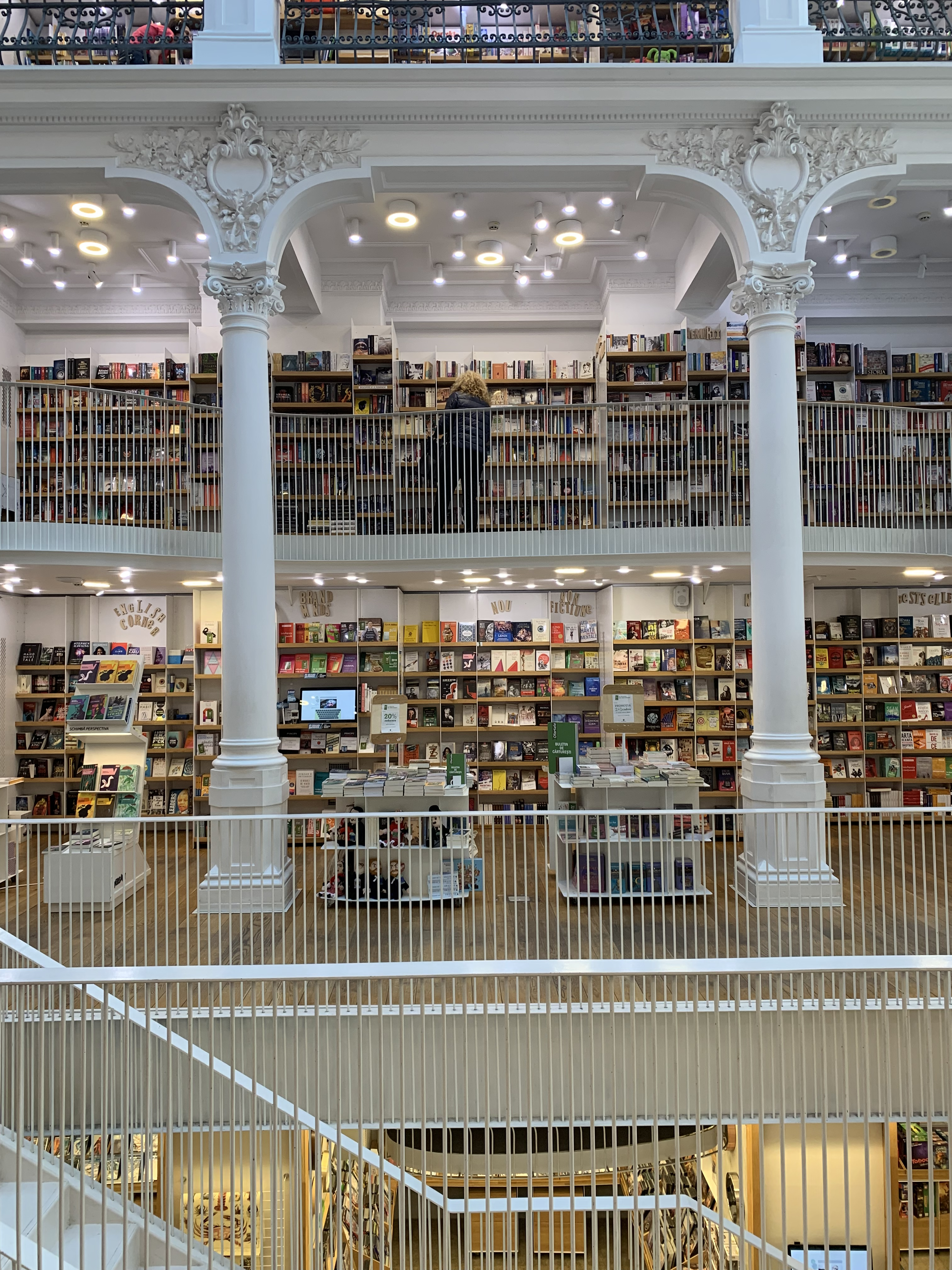
Columns and the stair to basement in the bottom of the photo

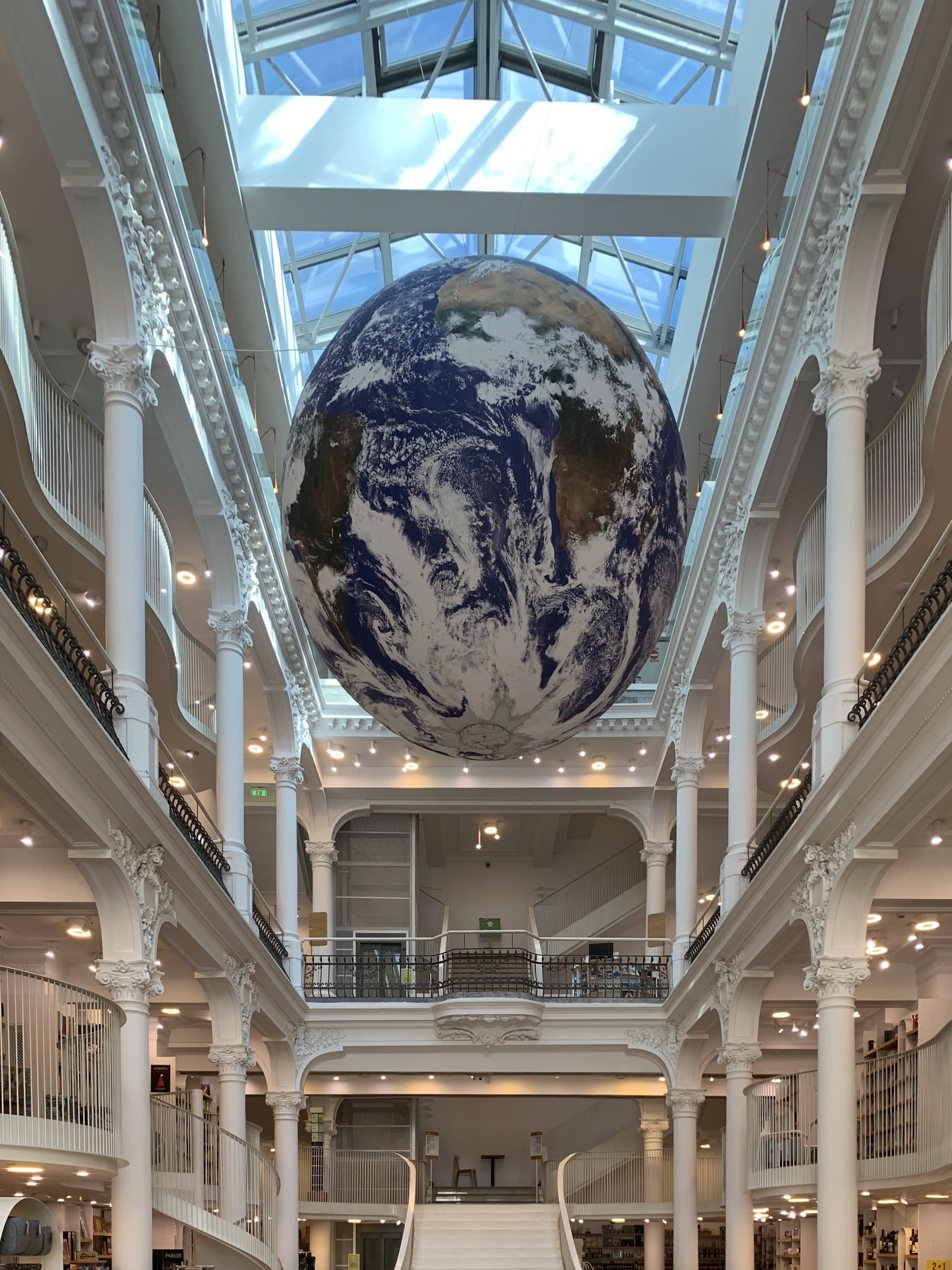
Earth globe exhibited in September 2019

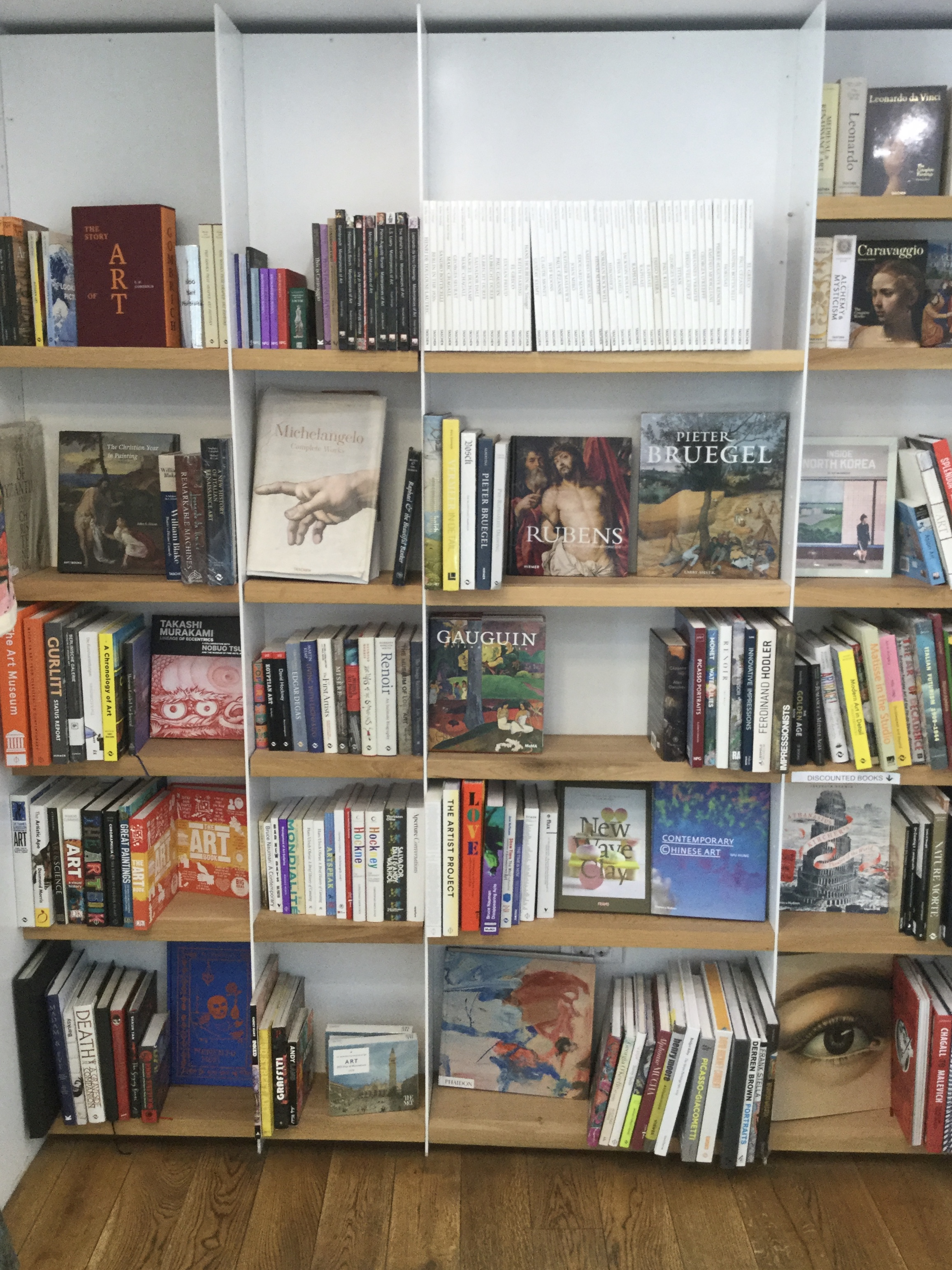
The bookshelf with art and art history books in August 2018

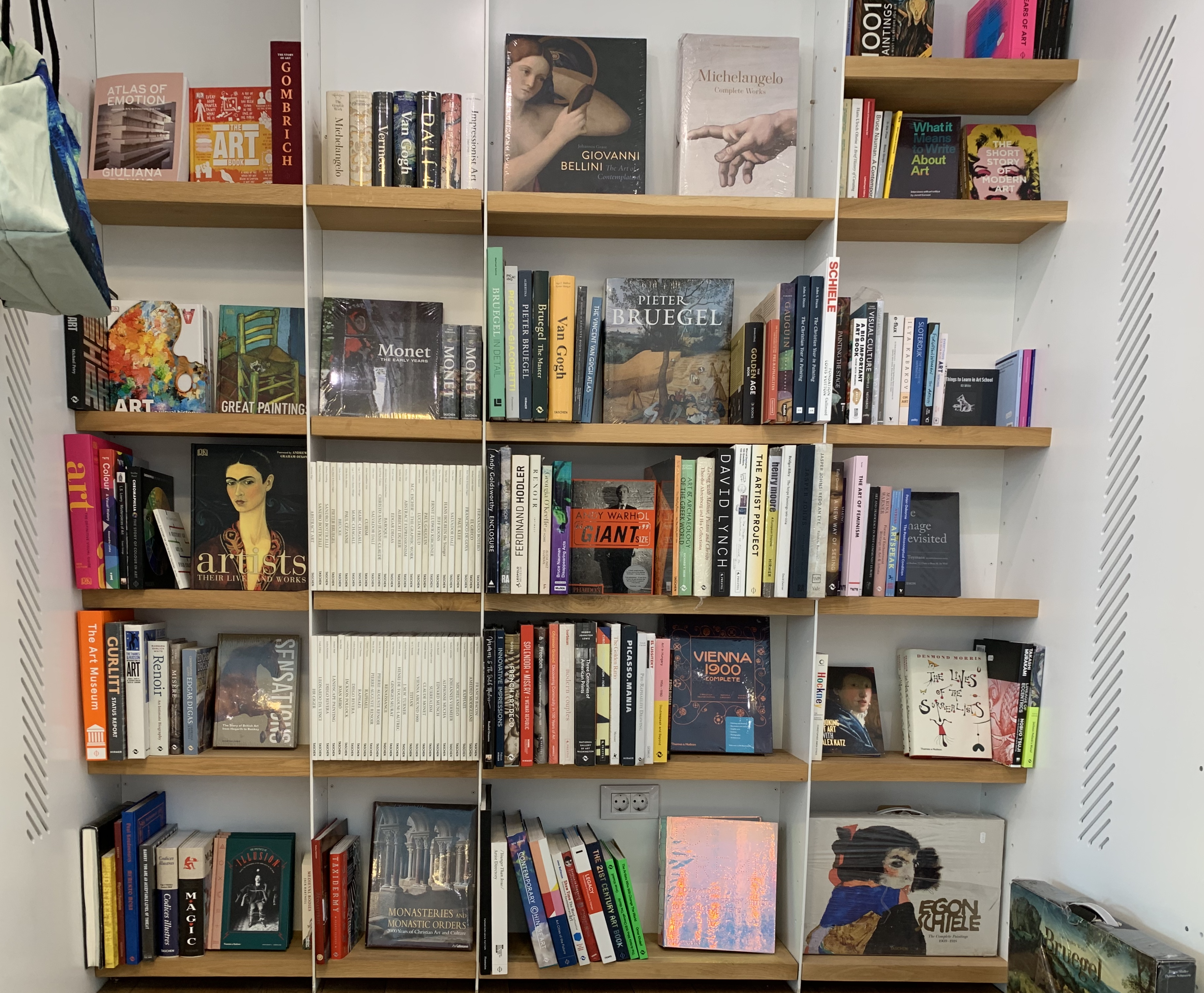
The same bookshelf in April 2019
