= John Danner (inventor) =

American inventor (1823–1918)

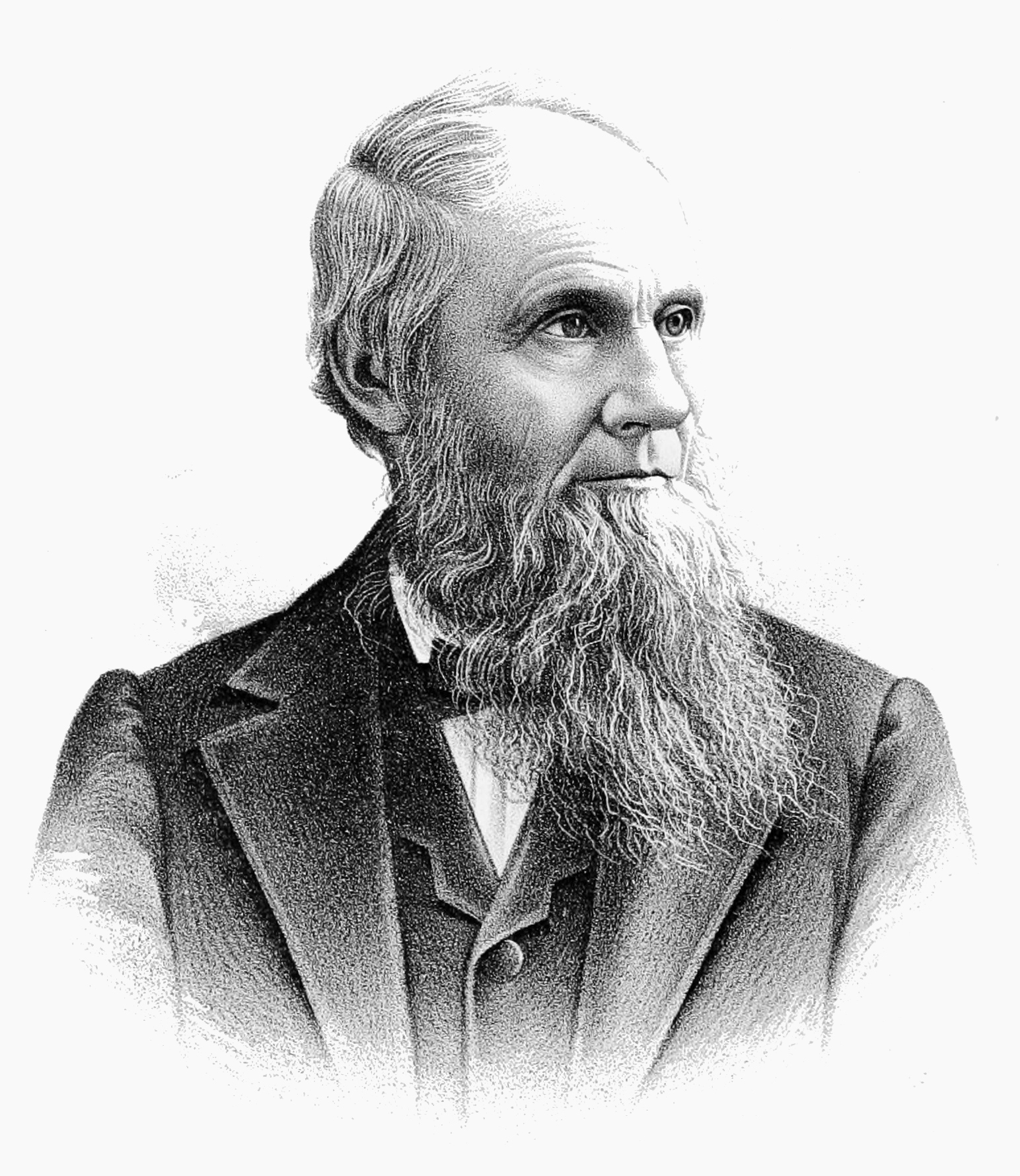
- Born: March 10, 1823; Canton, Ohio, U.S.
- Died: April 12, 1918 (aged 95); Canton, Ohio, U.S.
- Occupation: Inventor
- Known for: Inventing the pivot and post revolving bookcase
- Political party: Whig; Republican; Prohibitionist
- Spouse: Terressa A. Millard (m. 1847)
- Children: 7

Signature
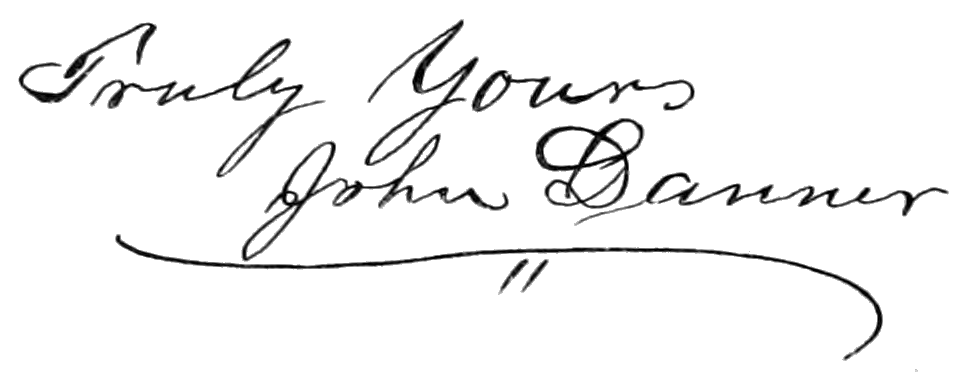

John Danner (March 10, 1823 - April 12, 1918) was an inventor from Ohio. He invented a revolving bookcase and ran the John Danner Manufacturing Company in Canton, Ohio.

== Early life ==
John Danner was born on March 10, 1823, in Canton, Ohio, to Anna (née Slusser) (1803–1885) and Jacob Danner (1795–1845). His maternal grandfather Philip Slusser built the first mill in Stark County in 1816. He was educated in Canton and attended the private school of Presbyterian minister T. M. Hopkins.

== Career ==
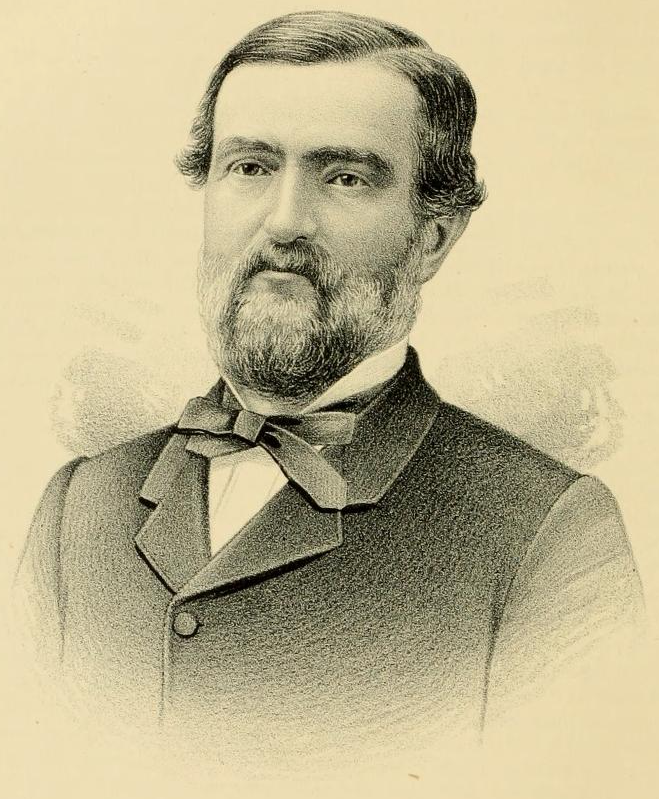
John R. Bucher in 1892 publication

Danner started his career as a clerk in the dry goods store of Martin Wikidal. He worked there four years. In 1865, he partnered with John R. Bucher in the Canton Stove Works. Danner left the business in a year. He then worked in clothing and dry goods until 1876.

Danner invented the John Danner Revolving Bookcase, a pivot and post revolving bookcase. He patented the bookcase on May 16, 1876. His bookcase hangs suspended from a simple cast iron bearing which sits on top of an inner column or post. The revolving mechanism consists of two nesting cast iron cones that provide a precise pivot point supporting the entire weight of the bookcase. The top support suspension design addressed the binding and racking problems of previous bottom bearing Lazy Susan type bookcases. "These cases, with their immense load, revolve with a slight touch of the hand; are noiseless in operation, and will last a lifetime." Originally designed to hold 32 volumes of the Encyclopedia, it is a compact, rotating bookcase. "It is a square of 22 inches taking up no more room on the floor than an ordinary chair."

In 1876, he started the John Danner Manufacturing Company. Yale College ordered a bookcase in 1877. In 1890, he relocated his business to Navarre Street in Canton. He won a gold medal at the Paris Exhibition the next year. "Several orders from Czarist Russia, kept the company busy through the panic of 1893." In 1903, a fire destroyed the entire factory. The factory was rebuilt and ran for another 13 years. In 1916, the Gillian Manufacturing Company purchased the John Danner Manufacturing Company.

He also edited the book Old Landmarks of Canton and Stark County, Ohio, published in 1904.

Danner was a member of the city council of Canton for six years and a member of the school board for six years. He was a Whig, Republican, and later became a Prohibitionist.

== Personal life ==
Danner married Terressa A. Millard, daughter of William J. Millard of Tioga County, Pennsylvania, on October 4, 1847. Her father and maternal grandfather Colonel Ball served in the War of 1812. Danner and his wife had seven children, Anna, Mary E., Julia A., Harriet N., Edith R., John N. and Almina T. He was a member of the First Baptist Church.

Danner lived at 84 South Market Street in Canton. He died on April 12, 1918, in Canton.
