= Palazzo del Senato (Milan) =

Baroque palace in Milan serving as the Archive of the State

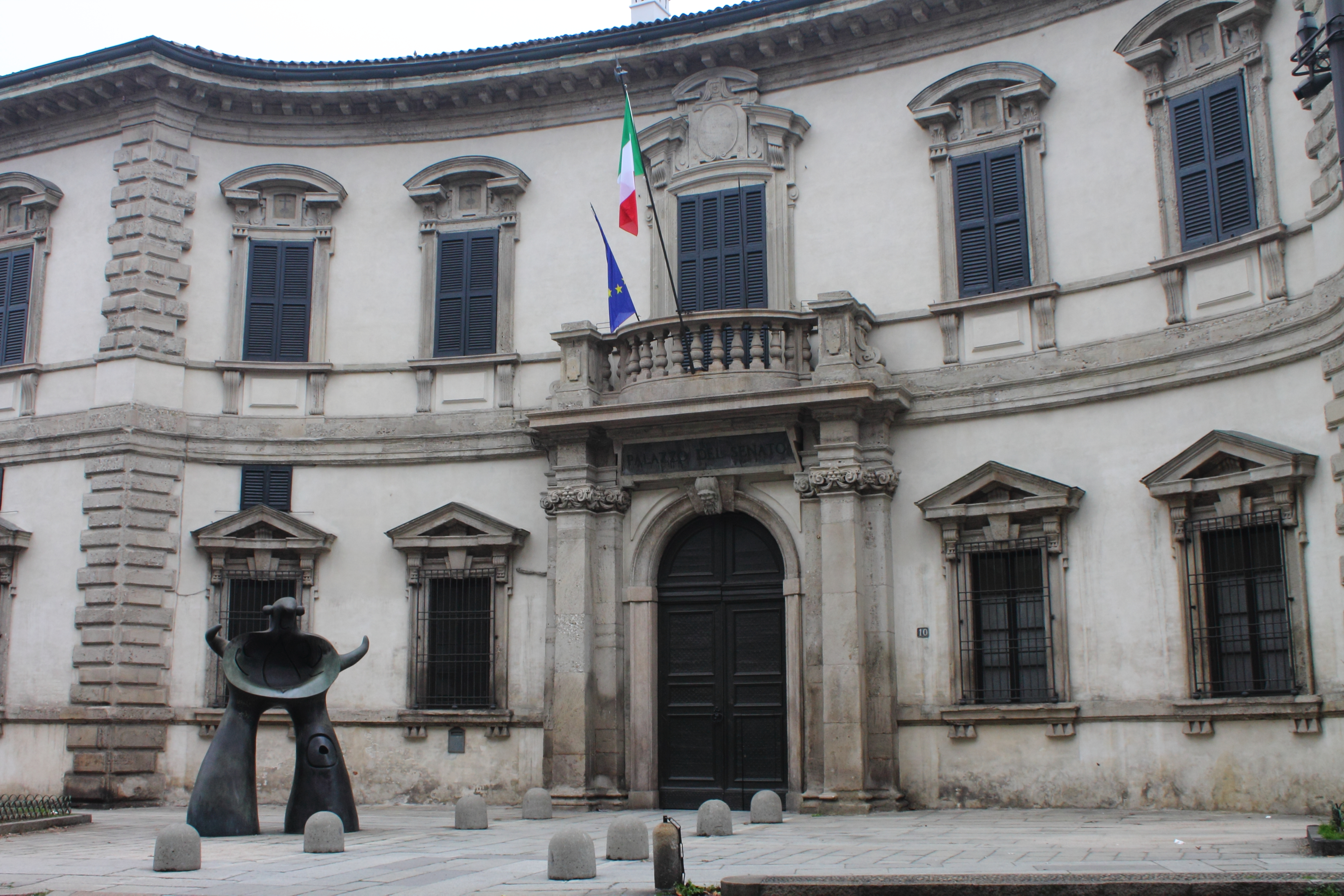
- Façade of the palazzo

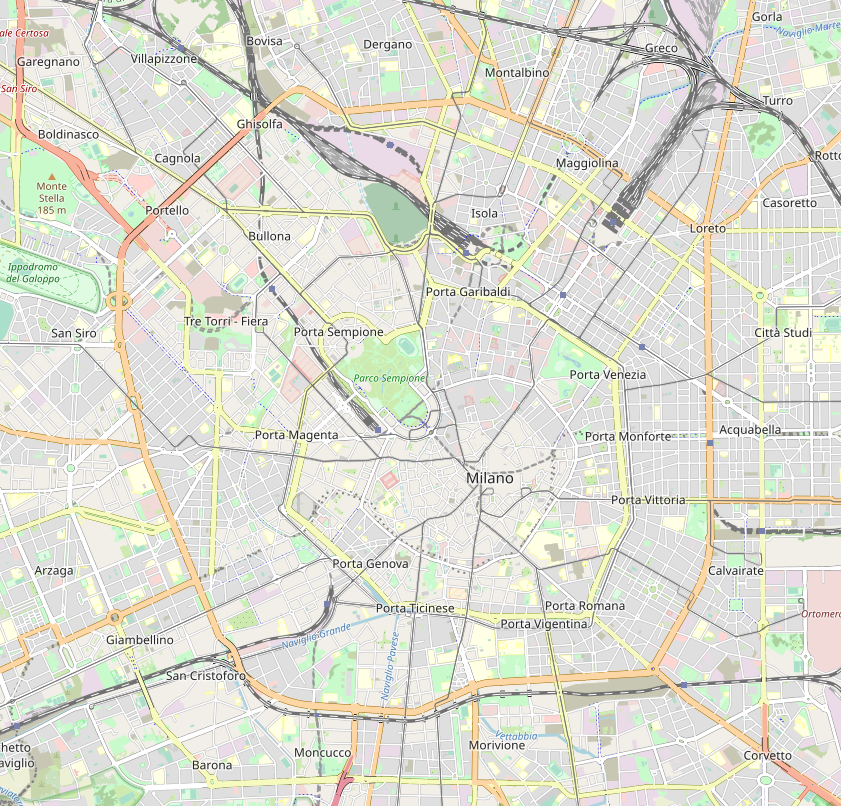
- Location within Milan Location within Italy

General information
- Architectural style: Baroque
- Location: Milan, Italy
- Coordinates: 45°28′13″N 9°11′56″E
- Construction started: 1608

The Palazzo del Senato is a Baroque palace in central Milan. It now serves as the Archive of the State (Archivio di Stato), and is located at 10 Via Senato.

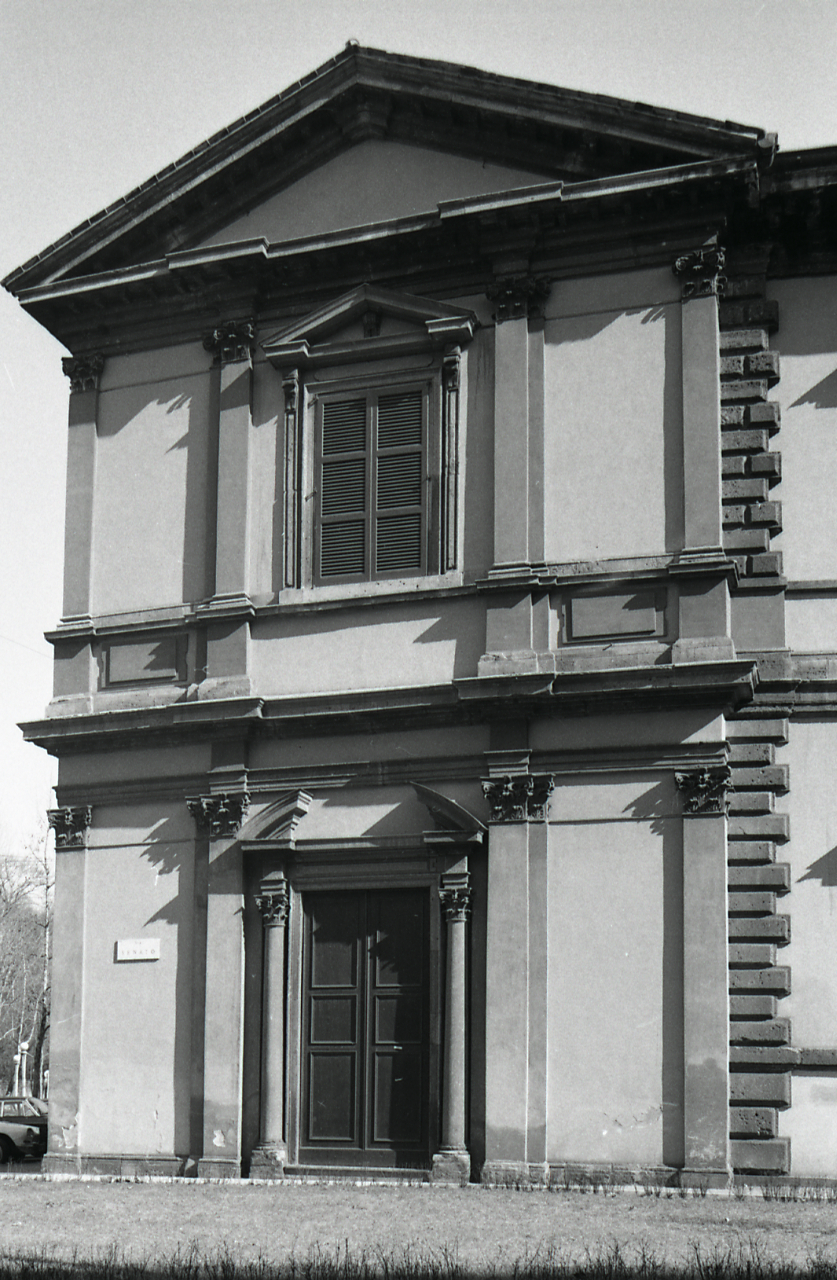
Facade of the church merged into the palace. Photo by Paolo Monti, 1971.

Construction of the palace was begun in 1608 by cardinal Federico Borromeo, who wished to erect a Swiss seminary college (Collegio Elvetico); the site held ruins of ancient convent of Umiliate nuns. Design of the project was initially assigned to Fabio Mangone, but completed by Francesco Maria Richini. The latter architect solved the problem of the disparate registers of the collegio and the adjacent church, with a convex façade. It curves forward on the right so that the edge on that side matches the church. In 1786, it became the host of government offices of the Habsburg Austrian Empire. In 1797, the invading French sited the house of deputies of the Cisalpine Republic. In 1805 to 1814, when Milan was the capital of the Kingdom of Italy, the palace served as the Senate house. In front of the palace, stands a statue by Joan Miró.

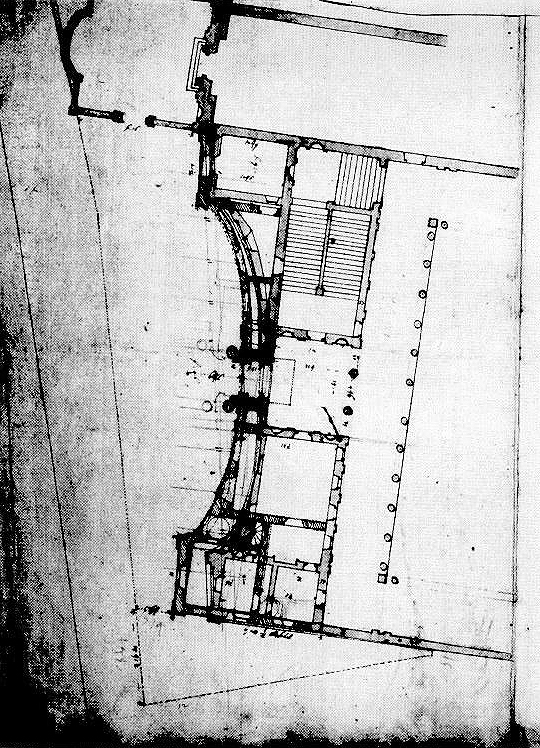
Part plan drawing
