= State Archives of Milan =

State archival institution in Milan, Italy

Historical Archives of Milan
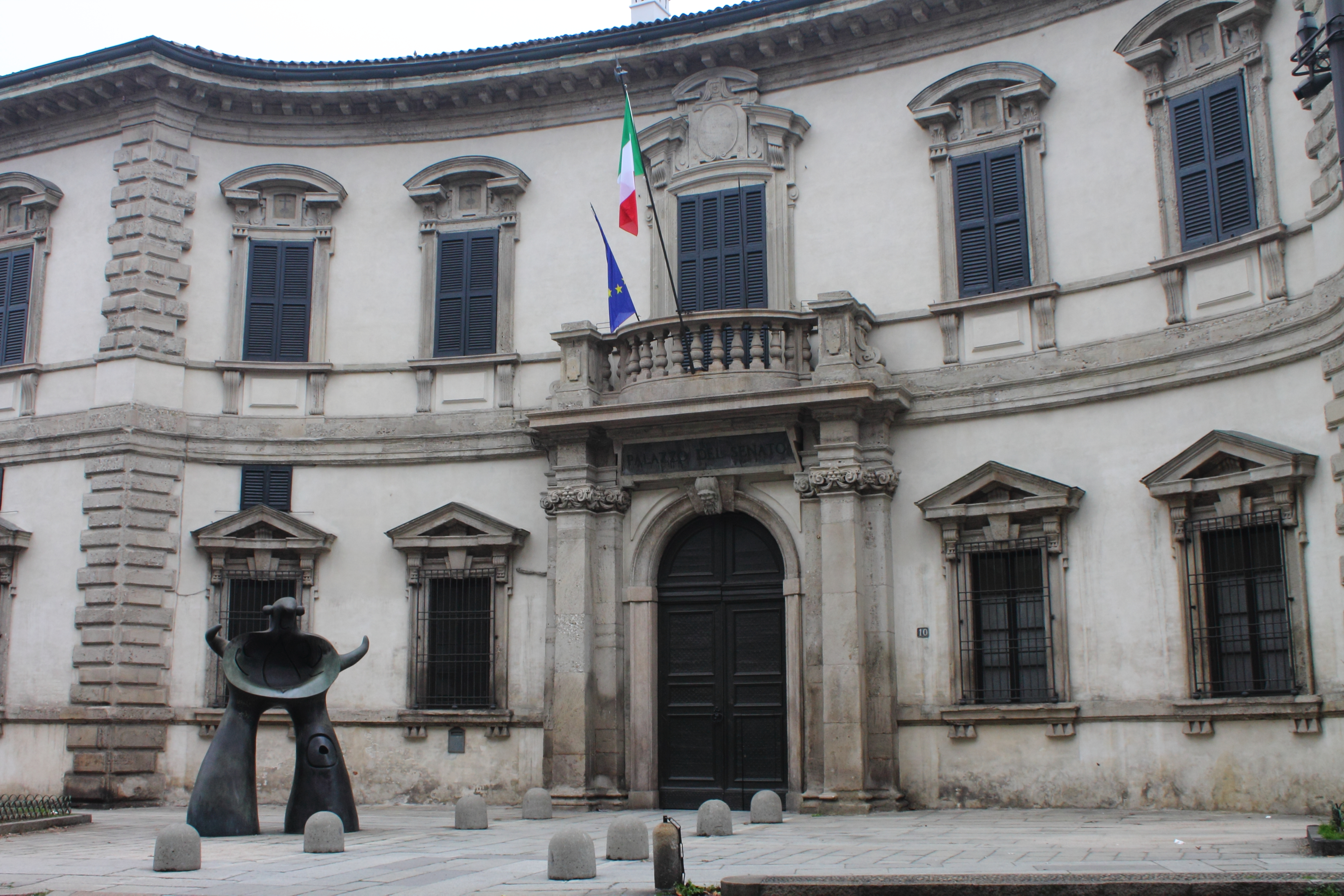
- Interactive map of Historical Archives of Milan
- 45.4703°N 9.1989°E
- Location: Via Senato, 10, Milan, Italy
- Type: State archives

Building information
- Building: Palazzo del Senato
- Website: http://www.archiviodistatomilano.beniculturali.it

The State Archives of Milan (abbreviated by the acronym ASMi), based at the Palazzo del Senato, Via Senato n. 10, is the state institution responsible, by law, for the preservation of records from the offices of state bodies, as well as public bodies and private producers. Slowly formed through the agglomeration of the various archival poles spread throughout Austrian Milan between the end of the 18th and the first half of the 19th century, the State Archives finally found its home in the former Palazzo del Senato under the direction of Cesare Cantù in 1886. Having become a research and training center of excellence under the directorships of Luigi Fumi and Giovanni Vittani, the State Archives of Milan since 1945 continued its role as a preservation institution, adapting to the needs of the times and developing the School of Archival Studies, Palaeography and Diplomatics attached to the Institute.

The Milan State Archives, which currently covers 45 km of shelves and a storage space of 6,460 m^{2}, preserves archives and collections containing records of political and religious institutions prior to Unification, such as the acts produced by the Sforza chancery or under the Spanish and Austrian governments. Following the outline prepared by the General Directorate of Archives, in addition to the documents produced before 1861, the State Archives collects and preserves the acts produced by the Italian state agencies reporting to Milan, such as the prefecture, the court and the Milanese police headquarters, as well as notarial acts from the local district notarial archives (after a hundred years since the notary in question ceased activity) and those from the archives of the military districts. Finally, there is the miscellaneous archives subdivision, not falling under the previous chronological subdivision and consisting mainly of private or public archives.

Some of the most famous documents that the Archives preserve include the Cartola de accepto mundio, the oldest Italian parchment preserved in any Italian State Archives (dating back to 721); the Codicetto di Lodi; autographed letters from Leonardo da Vinci, Charles V, Ludovico il Moro and Alessandro Volta; a valuable copy of the Napoleonic Code autographed by the emperor himself; and the minutes of the trial against Gaetano Bresci.

== History ==
=== The formation process (1786-1851) ===
==== The move to San Fedele: Ilario Corte and Kaunitz ====
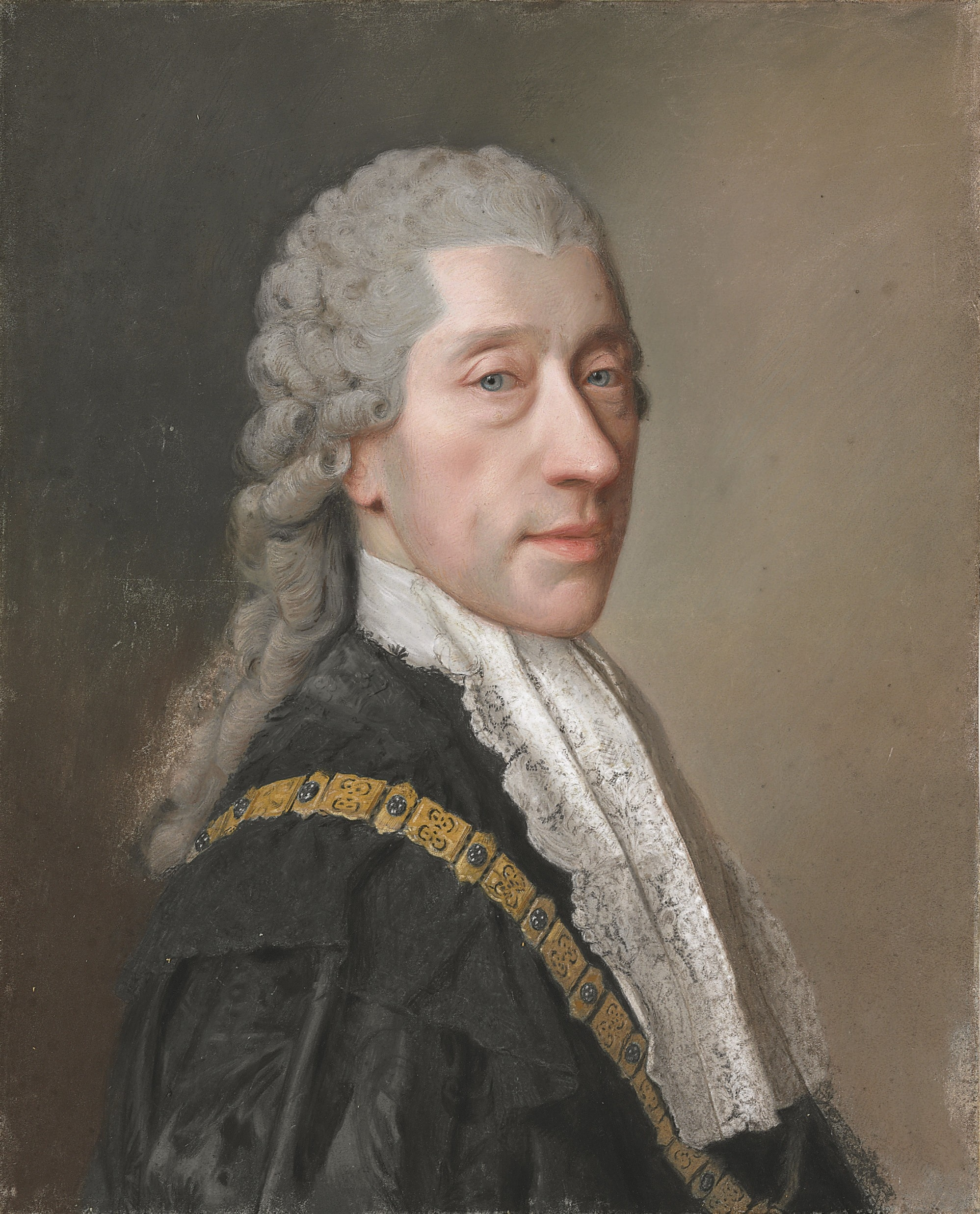
Jean-Étienne Liotard, Portrait of Count Wenzel Anton Kaunitz, 1762, private collection

The date with which the formation of the nucleus of what was to become the State Archives of Milan (at that time called the Government Archives of Milan) is identified is 1781, the year in which the documentation from the Porta Giovia Castle, the present-day Sforza Castle, was transferred to the Jesuit college, located in the church of San Fedele. The documentation consisted mainly of the Acts produced by the magistracies of the Duchy of Milan under the Sforzas, since the Visconti documentation was almost completely destroyed following the death of the last duke of that dynasty, Filippo Maria (1447), but it also included the archives of the Spanish and Austrian chancelleries of the 16th-18th centuries. The decision to move from the old to the new location was dictated by the dual desire of the archivist Ilario Corte (1723-1786) and Emperor Joseph II's minister plenipotentiary, Wenzel Anton von Kaunitz-Rietberg, to secure the documents from the perilous Castello Sforzesco, but also to "rationalize" the state's documentary heritage according to the principles of rational organization of the Enlightenment temperament according to the method of ordering by subject matter that would later find a radicalization in the work of Corti's pupil, Luca Peroni. The decision by the Austrian government to establish a first General Directorate of Archives aimed at coordinating the work of Lombard archives in 1786 can be framed in this perspective.

==== The Napoleonic period and the Restoration ====
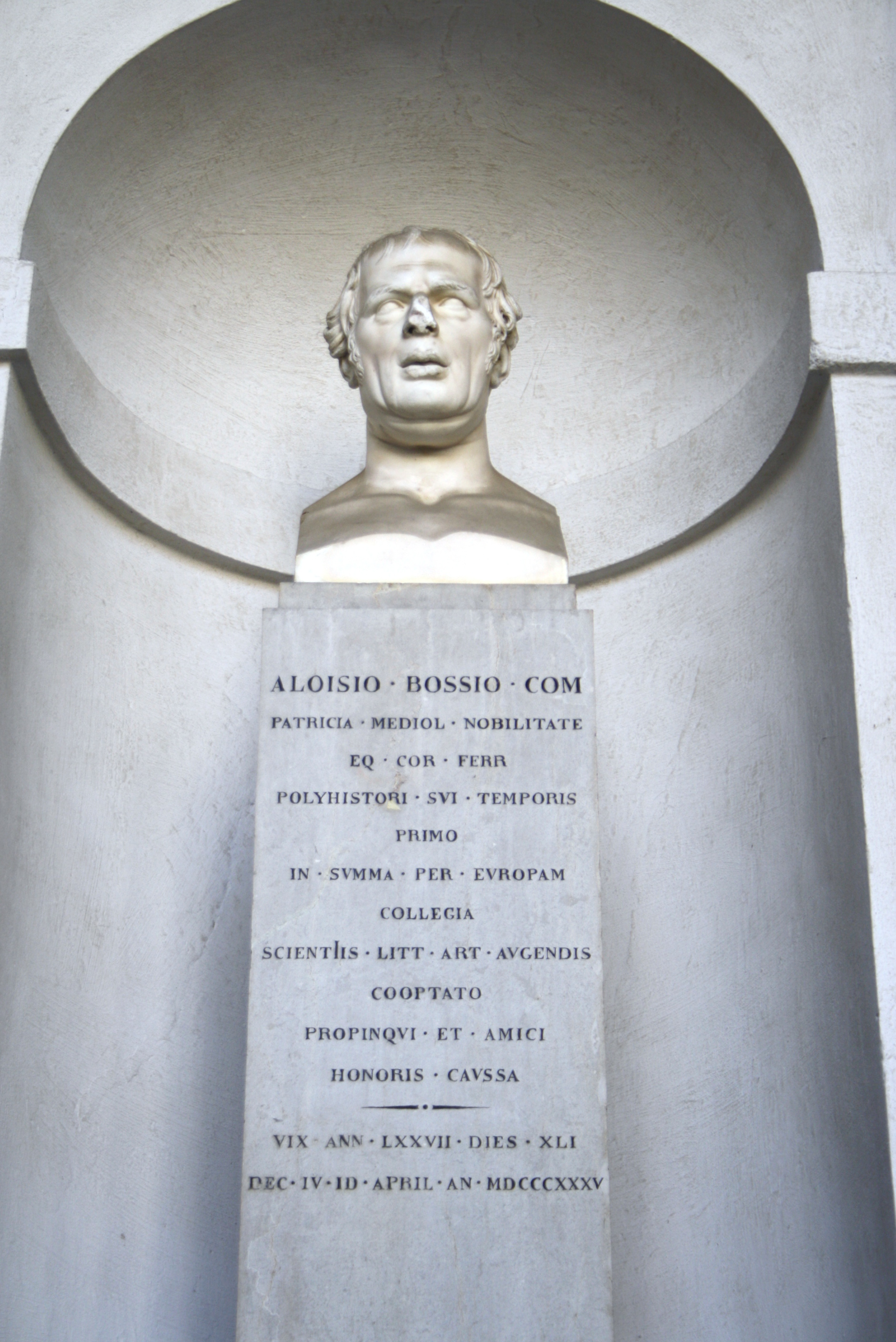
Bust of Luigi Bossi in Palazzo Brera

With the arrival of the French troops led by Napoleon Bonaparte (1796) a new historical phase opened for Lombardy, in which the former Duchy of Milan, reorganized and enlarged first as the Cisalpine Republic, then as the Italian Republic and finally as the Kingdom of Italy, became the centerpiece of a new independent state with its own court and various ministries, though it was actually subject to the will of Paris. During nearly two decades of French rule, the amount of archival holdings in the National Archives (new name for the Government Archives), whose direction was taken between 1800 and 1812 by Luigi Bossi Visconti, increased significantly due in part to the material produced by the various ministries of the Kingdom. Also at the behest of the French, in place of the General Directorate of Archives was established the General Prefecture of Libraries and Archives (1800), which would re-adopt its old name upon the return of the Austrians in 1814.

==== The various archival centers ====
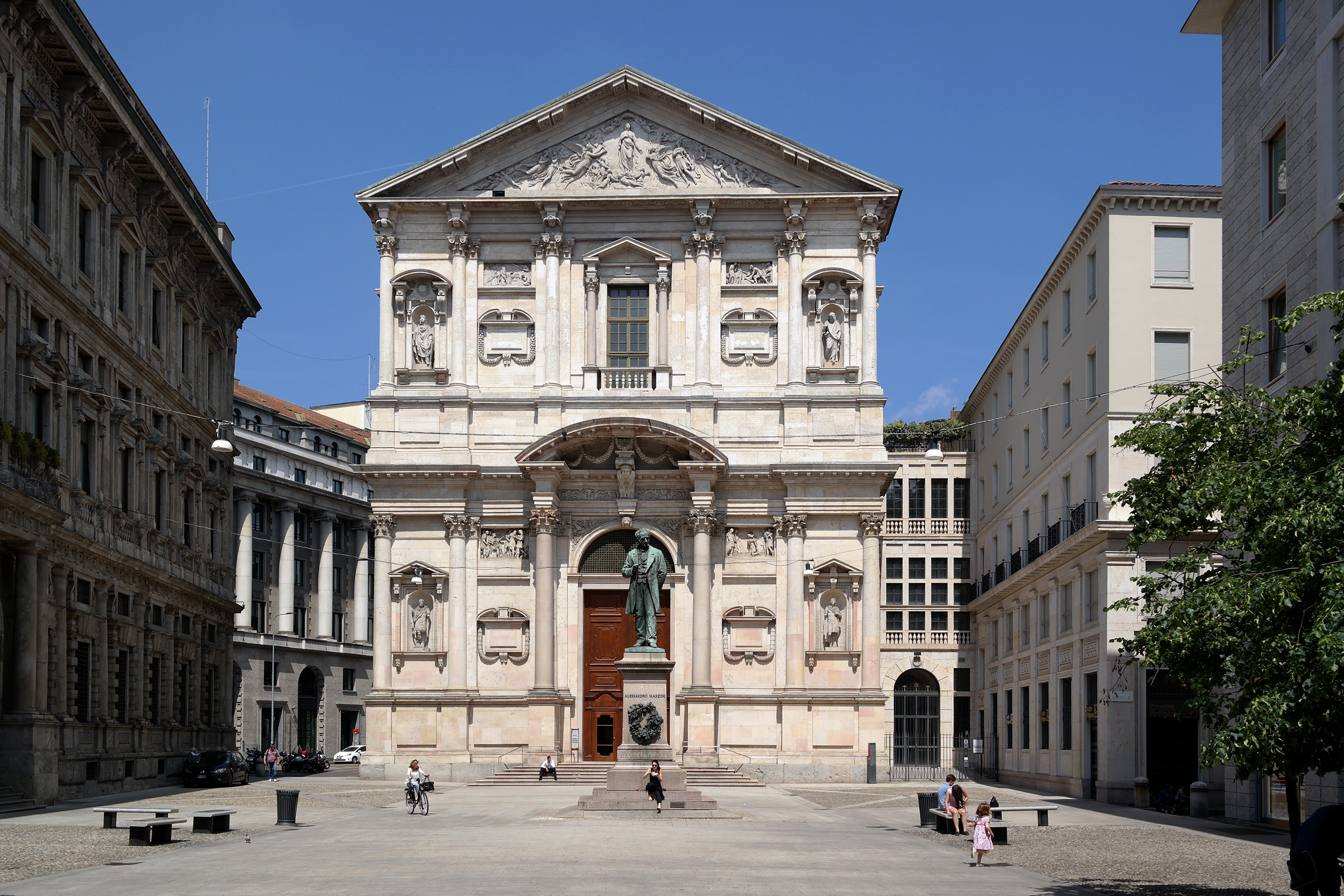
Piazza San Fedele, Milan

Over a period of time from the end of the first Austrian period to the second domination with the Kingdom of Lombardy-Venetia (1780-1851), various archival centers were established that were assigned to preserve certain specific collections, which would then gradually merge into the present State Archives:

1. In the Guide to Milan for 1848, it is reported that, in Contrada della Sala at number 956, there was the headquarters of the Directorate along with what was called the Central Archives.
2. At San Damiano the records relating to the Senate magistracy, established in 1499 and abolished in 1786, and then those concerning the Curia of the podestà and the Judges of Justice were all gathered.
3. Beginning in 1787, the archives of religious bodies and congregations suppressed under Joseph II first and Napoleon later found space in the former hospice of San Michele alla Chiusa. Following various moves, the records of the suppressed orders found their place in the former convent of Santo Spirito from 1839. Only later did what had by then become the Religion Fund find its final place in San Fedele.
4. In 1802 the former Helvetic College became the headquarters of the Ministry of War of the Italian Republic first and then of the Kingdom of Italy, resulting in the creation of the military archives, which, after being deposited at the church of San Carpoforo at number 1885, would be moved to the San Fedele premises in 1852.
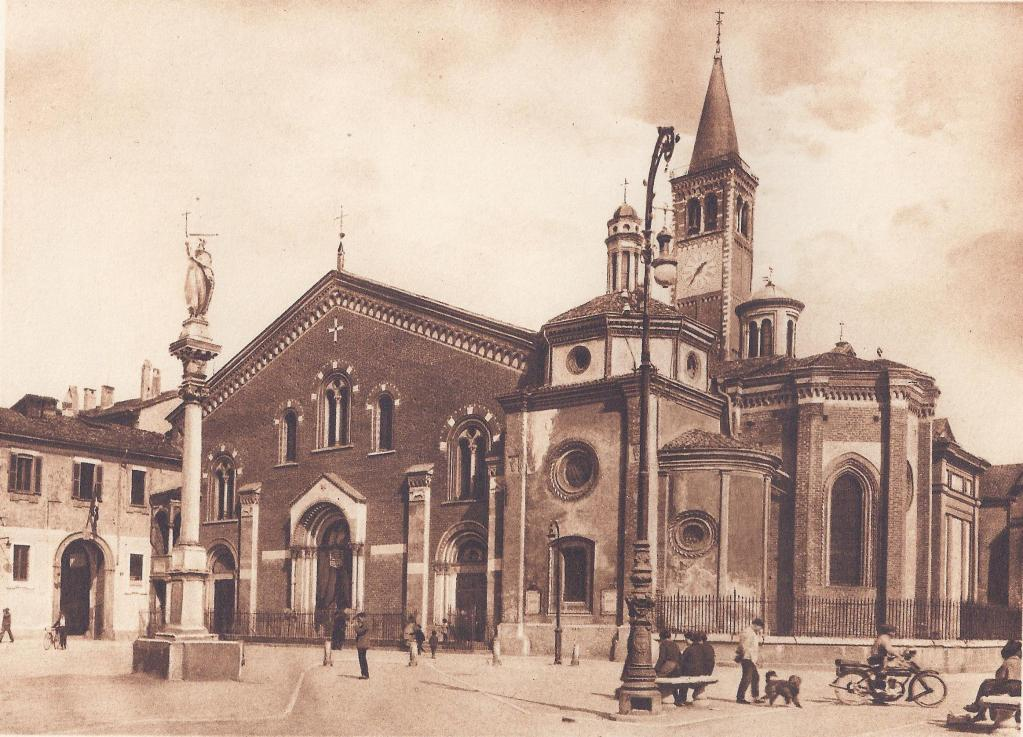
  The Basilica of Sant'Eustorgio, in Milan.
5. In Palazzo Marino from 1823 the financial archive was housed. Then in 1831 it was transferred to the former Monastery of Sant'Ulderico al Bocchetto, located at number 2466.
6. The Broletto, already by the will of Maria Theresa of Austria, became the seat of the notarial archives (1769-1775), which would remain there until the entire first half of the 19th century.
7. The Diplomatic Archive, established in 1807, was placed in 1816 in the Rectory of San Bartolomeo and then moved to the premises of the Notarial Archive in Piazza dei Mercanti at number 3091 from May 1840.
8. The Judicial Archives, established in 1802 as the Judicial Depository Archives, came under the dependencies of the San Fedele headquarters in 1823. Located in the cloister of the Basilica of Sant'Eustorgio in 1920, it suffered very heavy losses during the bombings in August 1943.

=== The transfer to the Former Helvetic College (1851-1886) ===
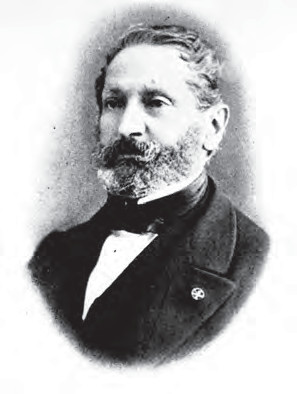
Luigi Osio, director of the archives of Lombardy from 1851 to 1873

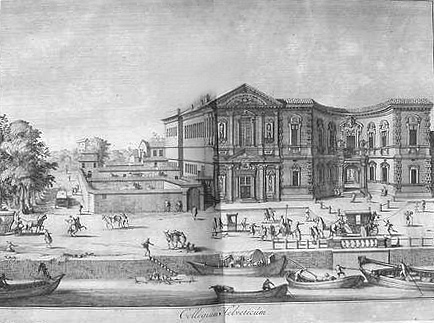
Giovanni Giorgio Grevio, The Helvetic College, from Thesaurus Antiquitatum et Historiarum Italiae, Leiden 1704

In 1851 Luigi Osio (1803-1873) was appointed director general of the archives of Lombardy, who, driven by several motives, began to think about a unified headquarters that would gather the various collections scattered around Milan. A first motivation lay in the fact that the capability of space in San Fedele was slowly diminishing; secondly, Osio wished to find a single archival location to make it easier for scholars and researchers to consult the various documents scattered in the aforementioned archival centers. Following the unification and proclamation of the Kingdom of Italy (1861), Osio began to take an interest in having the entire documentary complex transferred to the former Helvetic College. Built by Federico Borromeo in 1608 with a seminary established thirty years earlier by St. Charles (1579) for the special training of priests who would carry out their pastoral ministry in the Swiss valleys imbued with Calvinist doctrine, the building, under Napoleon's Italic reign, between 1809 and 1814, housed the seat of the royal senate.

The director's desire, however, had to run up against bureaucratic and technical impediments that lingered for more than two decades, so much so that Osio's successor, the historian Cesare Cantù, remarked in the early 1880s that there was still considerable slowness in the fulfillment of his predecessor's intentions. While in 1873 the General Directorate of Archives took up residence in the Palazzo del Senato, it was not until 1886 that all the archival collections hitherto scattered in various parts of Milan, with the exception of the notarial archives, finally were housed there.

=== From 1886 to 1945 ===
==== From Osio to Cantù ====
Now the State Archives has one director, one section head, one first-class and three second-class secretaries; four first-class, five second-class, six third-class sub-secretaries; six first-class, three second-class clerks; a total of 30 clerks, not counting custodians, ushers and janitors.

— Milan State Archives, p. 68

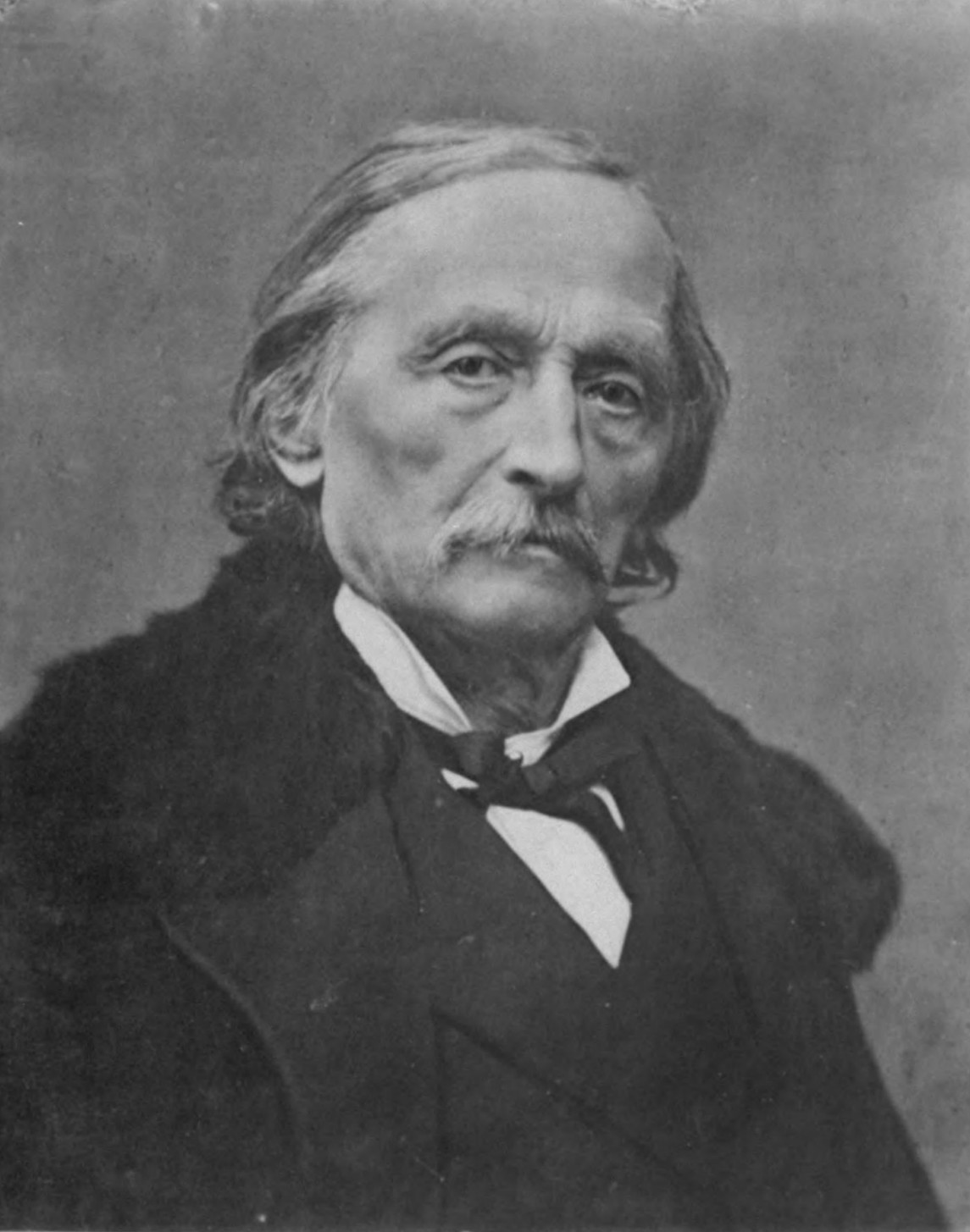
Portrait of Cesare Cantù

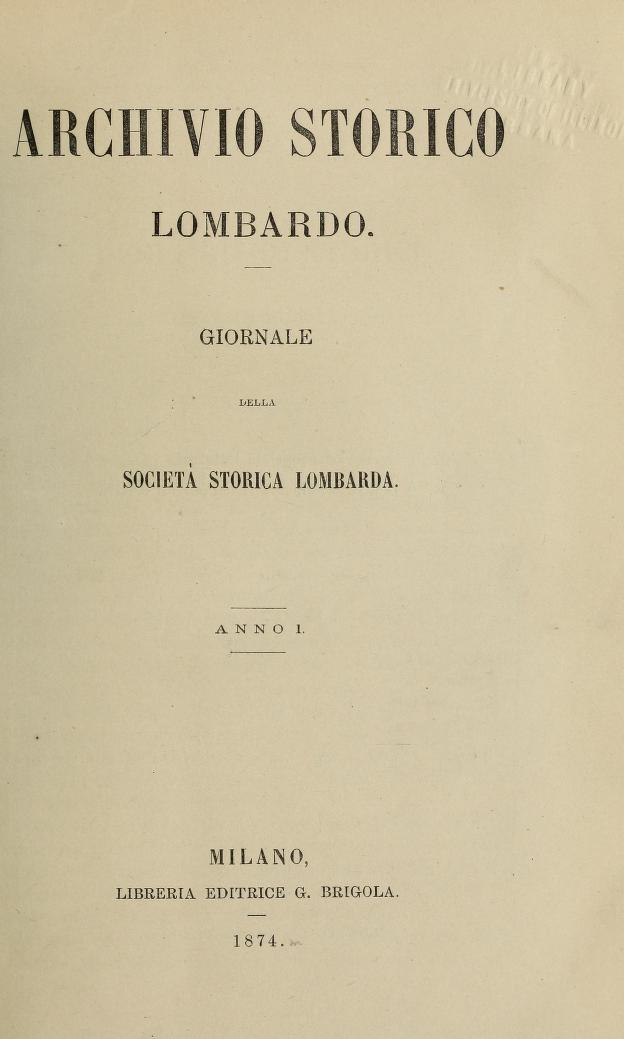
Historical Archives of Lombardy, Journal of the Lombard Historical Society, G. Brigola Publishing Bookstore, Milan 1874, year I

With the commission chaired by Luigi Cibrario in 1870, it was decided that, as of 1875, the administration of the fifteen state archives in the country should be placed under the supervision of the Ministry of the Interior. The State Archives of Milan, which was slowly coming into operation through the efforts of Osio first and Cantù later, also began to collect documentation from the archives of state offices (cadastral records, prefecture records, court records, etc...) in addition to that mentioned earlier. Cantù, moreover, was an important organizer of the activities of the archives and its related bodies, so much so that:

The fact is that Cantù brought to the state archives the fervor of his research and initiatives, and the Milanese institute benefited greatly from the prestige and fame of his directorship; the two decades of his direction were among the most significant in the history of the Milanese institute.

— Raponi, p. 314

In fact, it was up to Cantù to actually organize the archive once it became operational. Cantù is also credited with the founding in 1874 of the journal Archivio Storico Lombardo, which, in the intentions of the celebrated man of letters and historian, was to be "also the journal of the State Archives."

==== The methodological renewal of Fumi and Vittani ====
In the state archives of Milan there was, in short, between the end of the nineteenth century and the beginning of the twentieth century, a long period during which, as if by force of inertia or as if every initiative remained paralyzed by the weight of a certain tradition, archival work - sorting of collections, filing, drafting of catalogs and inventories - remained practically at a standstill in the face of uncertainty about the method to be followed.

— Raponi, p. 316

With this phrase, Nicola Raponi wanted to emphasize the oxymoronic combination that existed in the State Archives: on the one hand, the great research of the archivists led by Cantù; on the other, inexperience on the part of the archivists themselves in the management of the collections entrusted to them. (Note: Cassetti (2008, p. 50) recalls, among other things, Cantù's lack of archival sensitivity, who ordered the removal of pre-1650 documents from many collections, prompting an investigation by the Ministry of the Interior.) Above all, Luigi Fumi (director since 1907), assisted by Giovanni Vittani (who would be his successor from 1920), would initiate a process of modernization of archival science that would be reflected both in the teaching of the school (as will be explained in the section on it), and in the break with the Peronian system that still reigned under Osio and Cantù, using as the "scientific" voice of the institute's activities the magazine Annuario del Regio archivio di stato di Milano, published between 1911 and 1919.

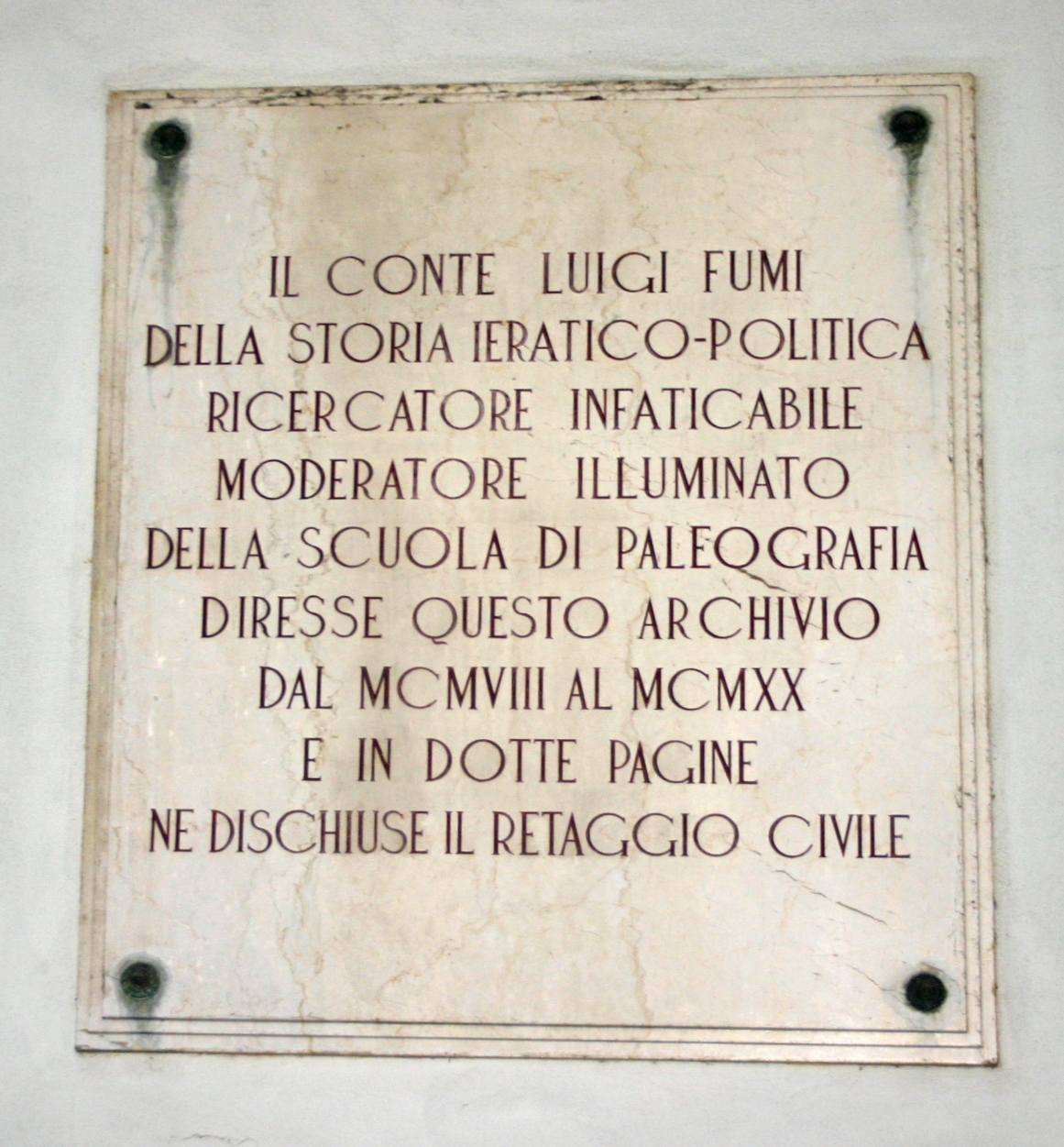
Tombstone of Luigi Fumi

==== World War II ====
The Archives' activities continued unperturbed until World War II, when wartime events plunged Italy into the abyss of desolation and then Nazi occupation. As early as September 1939 Guido Manganelli, newly appointed director of the ASMi following the death of Giovanni Vittani, took care to have the collections "evacuated" from the Palazzo del Senato and deposited in nearby and safer Brianza, exactly at Villa Greppi located in Monticello Brianza and, after Italy's official entry into the war in June 1940, in Rovagnate and Merate at some buildings belonging to the Church. Despite the tireless activity on the part of Manganelli and the ASMi staff in safeguarding the various collections, a considerable part of the archival heritage was destroyed during the bombings of August 12/13 and 15/16, 1943. On these two dates, Milan was violently bombed and, among the buildings hit by the Allies, were the Palazzo del Senato and the cloister section of Sant'Eustorgio: the administrative fund of the State Archives (the so-called Archivietto), the Library, the section of the judicial archives and most of that of the Senate of the Duchy of Milan (Note: The part relating to the Senate, which consisted of 2000 items, was severely damaged, so that only 699 folders of the Fidecommessi fund survive today. Cf. Monti (2001, p. 114, n. 315).) were irretrievably lost. In 1944, the Senate Palace housed the notarial archives.

=== The State Archives from 1945 to the present ===
To Natale, director, are due: the reconstruction of the Senate Palace, already undertaken by Guido Manganelli; the study of the Peronian Fund, in close connection with the reconstruction of the fund, displaced in wartime; the edition of the Diplomatic Museum and the care of the Diplomatic...; the teaching of Archivistics brought into the University of Milan.

— Piano, p. 325

==== The work of restoration: between Manganelli and Natale ====
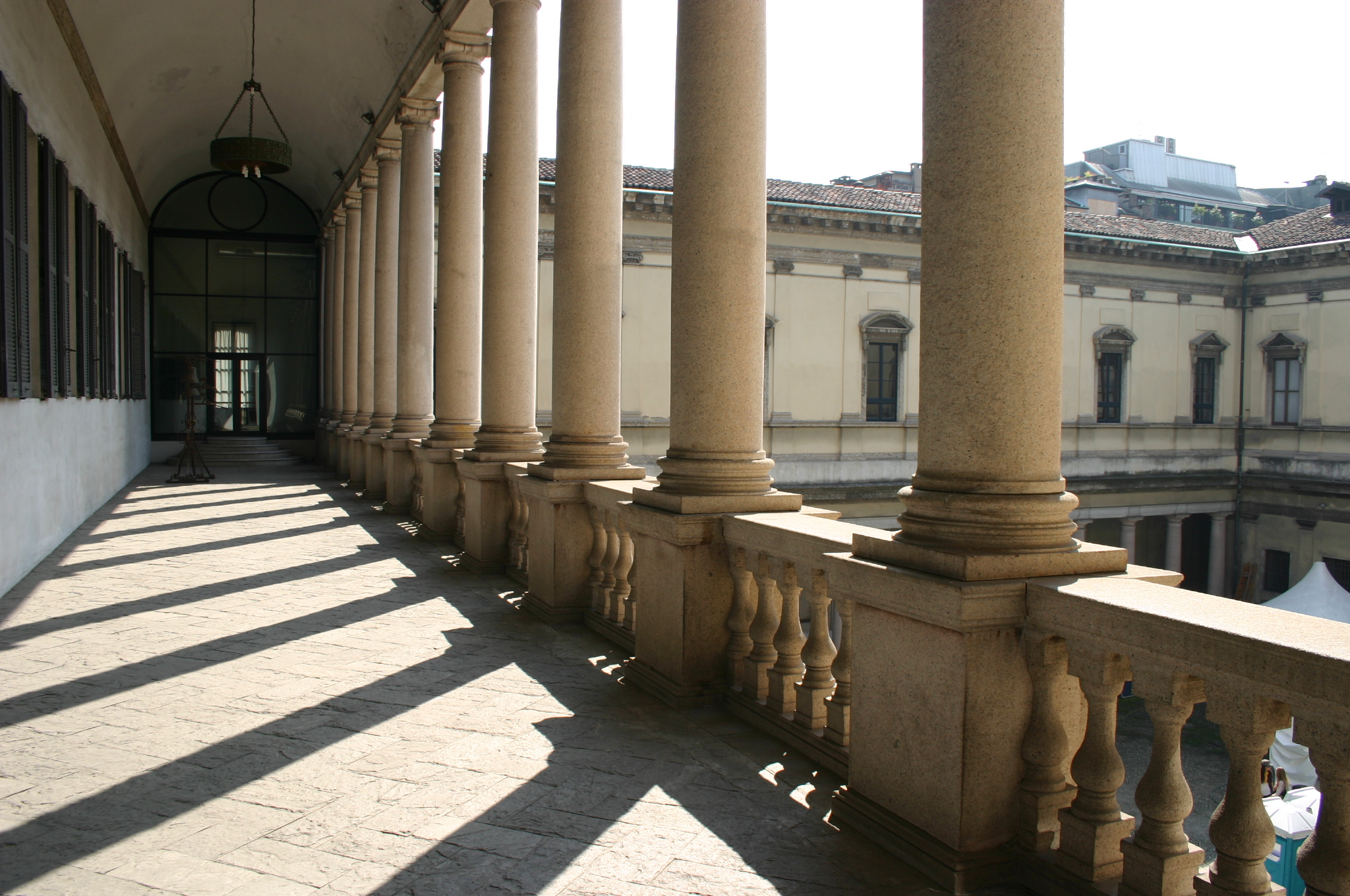
Colonnade of the second courtyard, north side.

In the aftermath of the war, the palace underwent an architectural reconstruction that lasted for most of the 1950s and was entrusted partly to civil engineers and partly to the Superintendency. The result, in addition to renovating the most severely damaged parts, was also a rationalization of the interior spaces, creating a mezzanine between the ground and second floors. Spaces for a library and archival school were created on the ground floor, while the second floor housed the administrative offices (measuring 1,886 m^{2}) and the current consultation (or study) room, measuring 281 m^{2}. In addition to Guido Manganelli's tenure, of note was the long tenure of Alfio Rosario Natale for the resumption of full-scale activities of the ASMi and its relaunching at the scholarly level in Italy and around the world, promoting a series of initiatives aimed at the dissemination, among the historical and archival elites, of the collections kept there.

In 1974, what was then called the Ministry of Cultural Heritage and the Environment (today's MiC) was founded, which almost totally replaced the Ministry of the Interior in the management of the State Archives. (Note: Sandulli (2012, p. 8) recalls that the Ministry for Cultural Heritage and the Environment was established by decree law of 14 December 1974. The Ministry of the Interior, which up to that time had had jurisdiction over the State Archives, nevertheless continued to have a say "in matters of archival documents that are not freely consultable" (Presidential Decree No. 854 of 30 December 1975).)

==== The services and activities of the ASMi ====
===== The Library between 1809 and 1943 =====
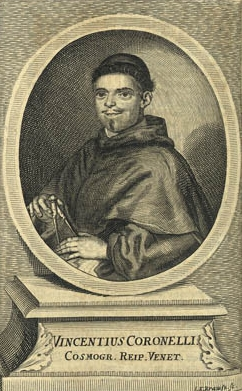
Vincenzo Maria Coronelli in an engraving by J. E. Kraus

Of particular importance is the library, founded in the Napoleonic era with the establishment of the Diplomatic Archives, more precisely in 1809, as can be seen from a letter from the Prefect of Archives and Libraries of the Kingdom of Italy, Luigi Bossi Visconti, to Archivist General Daverio. Gradually enriched during the 19th century, especially under Osio's tenure who, working with officials Dozzio, Cossa and Ferrario, increased this resource with "the establishment of a library of books special to archival subjects", the 1883 report on archives and related services reveals that the ASMi possessed "a valuable library, which consists of 1,634 works amounting to 3,369 volumes." From the 1876 edition of the Lombardy Historical Archives, it is revealed that various historical, genealogical, diplomatic and heraldic works were donated to the Library: the description of the works for the drying of Lake Fucino; two books by Damiano Muoni Tunisi, Expedition of Charles V Emperor and Family of the Isei; a book by the cosmographer Vincenzo Maria Coronelli, Armi, Blasoni e Insegne gentilizie delle famiglie patricizie di Venezia; the VIth volume of the documents collected by the Society of Deputation over the studies of Tuscan, Umbrian and Marche Homeland History; and others.

The library saw its holdings further increased thanks to the activity of director Luigi Fumi and his closest collaborator (and later in turn his successor) Giovanni Vittani, who created a section devoted exclusively to heraldry in 1919 and carried out the editing of the topographical catalog to endow the Library with a valuable internal research tool in aid of scholars. With the help of the stock register and topographical inventory (other "technical" sources relating to purchases and donations in the period before 1943) one learns of the patrimonial wealth achieved by the library: a rich section dedicated to law, volumes devoted to the history of the ancient pre-unitary states (Degli Statuti ciuili della Serenissima Republica di Genoua and the Diarii di Marino Sanudo il Giovane), art history, heraldry (Le leggi del blasone or L'arte vera dell'arme diuisa in due parti, by Louis De Lespine de Mailly), history (the Correspondance de Napoléon I) and archival, diplomatic and paleographic sciences. In addition, there were also incunabula and editions from the 16th and 17th centuries printed in Venice by the heirs of Aldo Manuzio.

===== The rebirth of the Library: from 1943 to the present =====
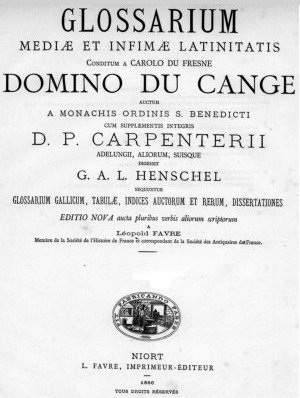
Charles Du Cange, Glossarium mediae et infimae Latinitatis [1678], published by Niort in 1883.

Severely destroyed by bombing on August 9/10, 1943, director Manganelli decided that as early as 1944 the Institute's Library should be rebuilt, although it was not reopened to scholars until 1948. During the 1950s and 1960s, in addition to the purchase of more recent volumes devoted to archival and related sciences, efforts were also made to "proceed - compatibly with economic resources - to purchase recently lost volumes", such as Pompeo Litta's Le famiglie nobili italiane or the important diplomatic treatise Nouveau traité de diplomatique, ou l'on examine les fondements de cet art by Charles Francois Toustain and René Prosper Tassin. However, over the past seventy years, the library returned to its former glory as a result both of purchases made by the Archives and generous donations from private individuals that brought the institution to a count of 40,000 monographs, 300 periodical titles and 15. 000 pamphlets, divided between the library room located on the ground floor and the study room, where mainly practical tools such as medieval Latin dictionaries (first and foremost the famous Glossarium Ad Scriptores Mediae et Infimae Latinitatis by the seventeenth-century philologist and linguist Charles du Cange) and Francesco Cherubini's Milanese-Italian dictionary are preserved. More generally, the library holdings consist of:

Among the works owned by the library, of particular note are those pertaining to the history of Milan and Lombardy, the history of institutions, archivistics, paleography, diplomatics, and the auxiliary sciences of history (numismatics, heraldry, sphragistics, etc.), as well as the history of art and literature of Lombardy, the History of Italy, and the history of the Church and the papacy.

— The Library

===== The conference room and digitization service =====
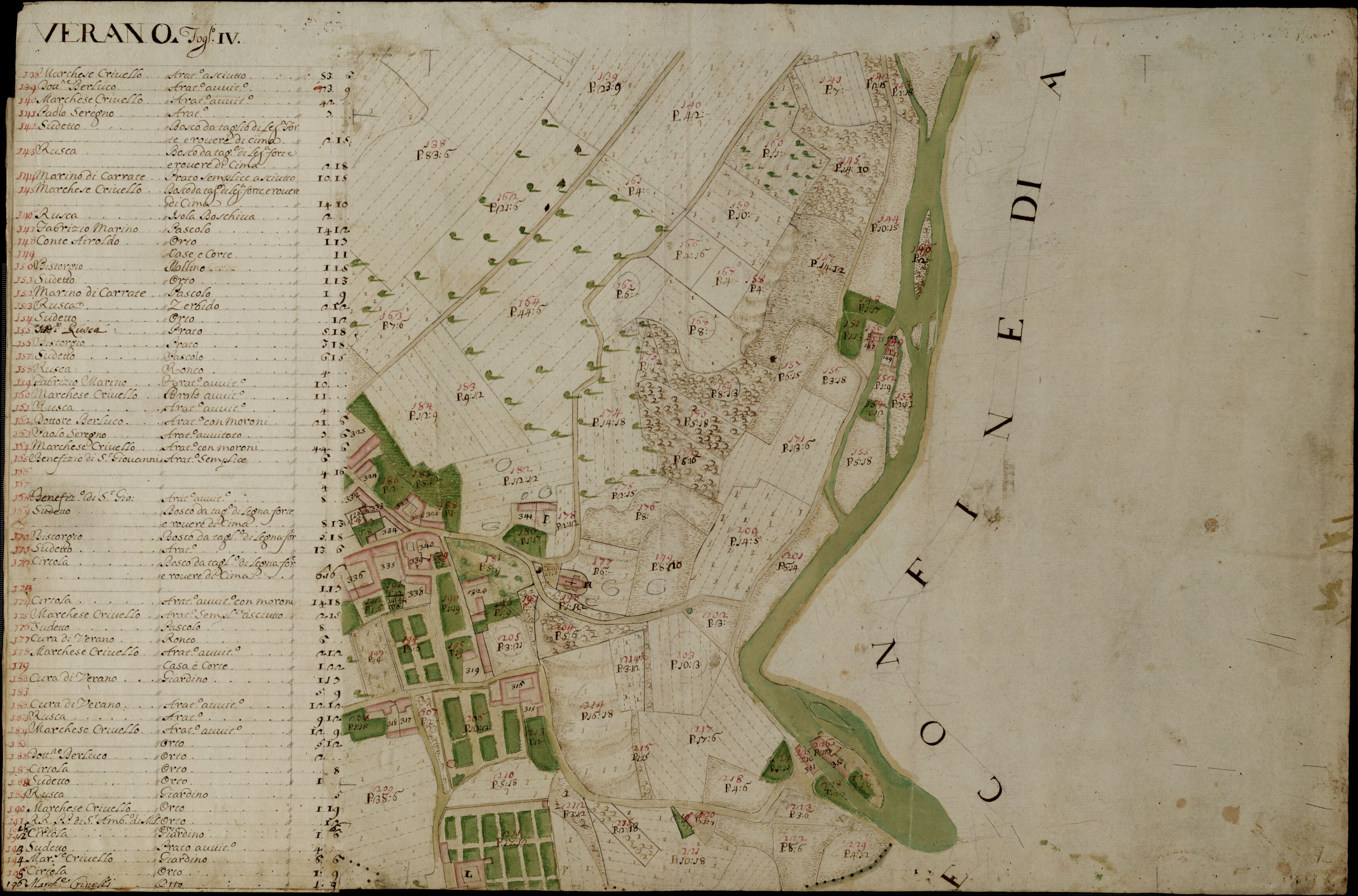
State Archives of Milan, Teresian Cadastre. Activation Maps, 3080, map 1 f. 4, Original map of the Censuario Municipality of Verano, map on paper, 1721.

After 1945, additional spaces were built at different times to serve as a reception for visiting scholars not only to consult the documents, but also so that they could participate in various meetings held by professors or ASMi officials regarding the heritage of the institution and, through it, the history of Milan. In this regard, the present Conference Hall, located on the ground floor of the first quadriporticus, was built, which serves both as a space for the Archival School and precisely as a lecture hall for lectures of the aforementioned nature. The hall measures 502 m^{2}.

Of particular note, with the onset of computer science beginning in the 1980s and 1990s, which entailed the relative specialization of the latter in the form of computer archival science and the concrete possibility of reproducing and, consequently, better preserving older documents through digitization, is the adaptation of some rooms on the second floor as a digital laboratory and for making microfilm, rooms that occupy a space of 70 m^{2}. As for ASMI, the digitization work was started between 1998 and 2003 with the Imago project regarding cadastral cartography. Since 2006, ASMi, in collaboration with the State Archives of Venice and the National Research Council, started the uploading of the material produced with the Imago project through the Divenire project, arriving at the realization of the Atlas of Historical Cadastres and topographic maps of Lombardy. The digitized maps, which number about 28,000, can be freely consulted through the Archives' website.

===== Heritage enhancement: between exhibitions, the Yearbook and guided tours =====
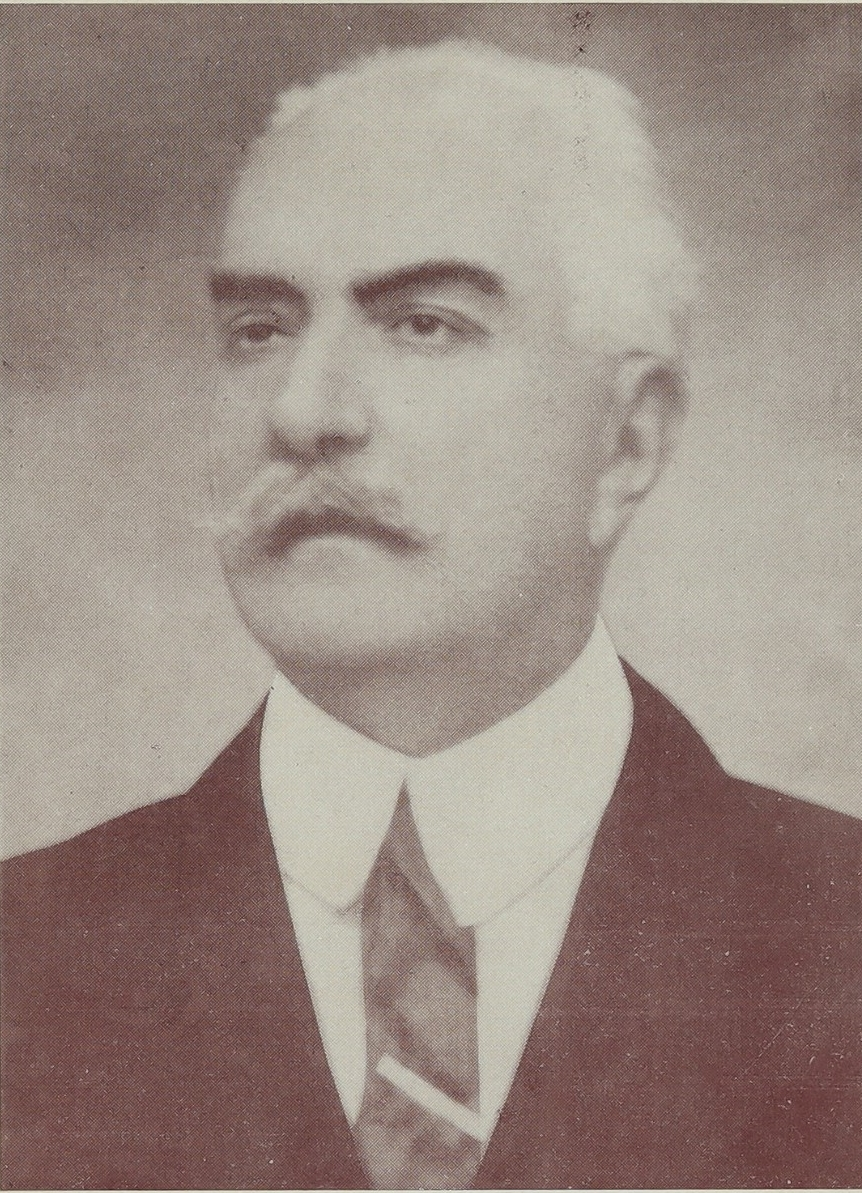
Luigi Fumi, director of the Milan State Archives from 1907 to 1920. In 2011 it was decided to celebrate the centenary of the Yearbook he founded by resuming its publication.

The concept of cultural heritage enhancement, although codified definitively by the 2004 Urbani Code, was given progressive attention by the Italian state from 1939 onward, when a "consciousness" about the value of artistic heritage began to develop through the "Franceschini Commission" (Law 310/1964), the establishment of an ad hoc ministry for cultural heritage between 1974 and 1975, and the Galasso Law (431/1985). With the Urbani Code, which rests on the two pillars of protection and enhancement, "dissemination" to the public of cultural heritage also became an integral part of the State Archives.

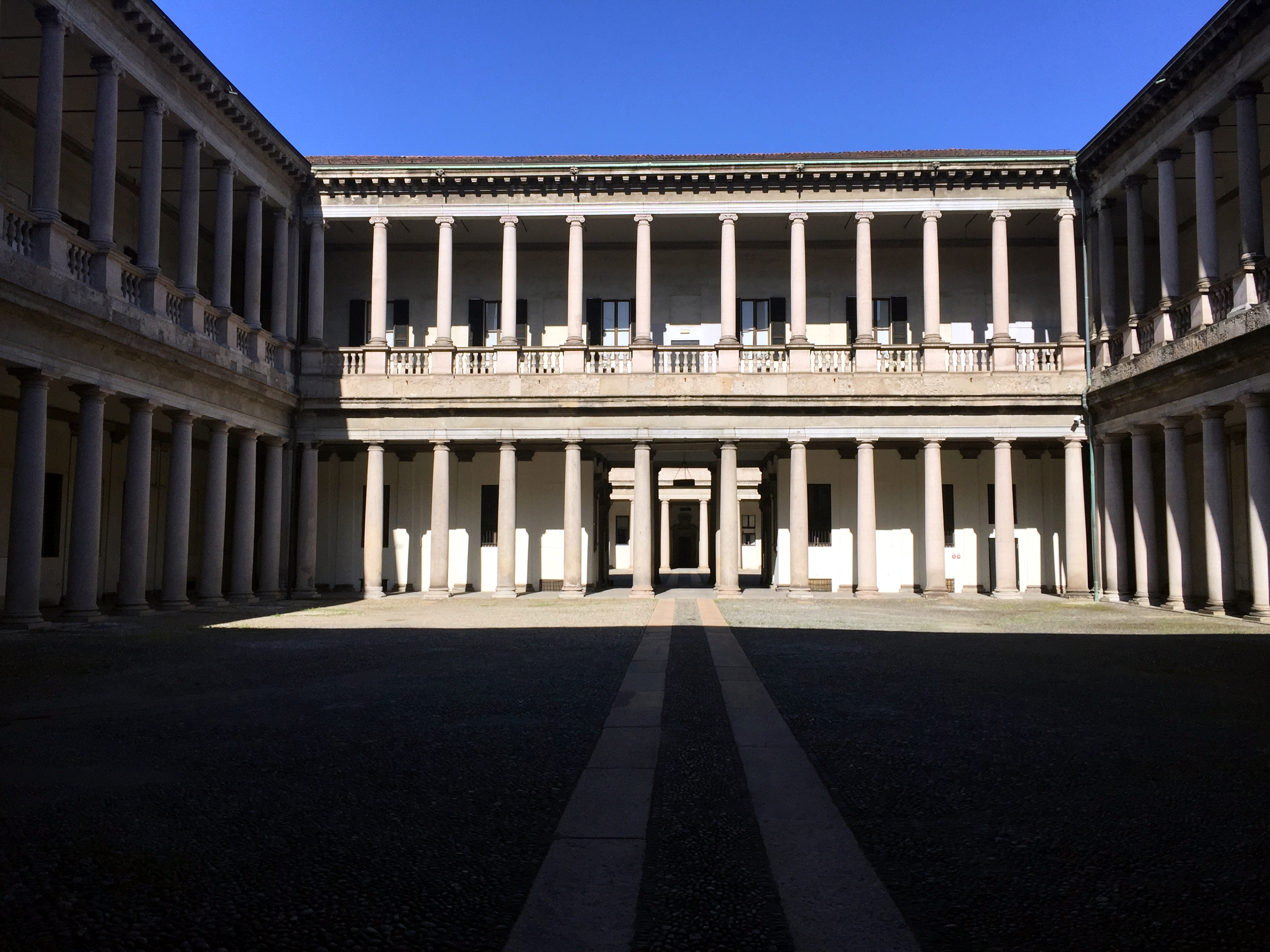
Inner courtyard of the Palazzo del Senato/State Archives of Milan

With regard to ASMi, as early as 1911 there were attempts to bring the population closer to the Institute's activities, through the already mentioned Academic Year Prolusions given by Giovanni Vittani. It was, however, only from 1957 onward that, under the direction of Alfio Rosario Natale (1956-1974), they began to organize exhibitions open to the public which would become increasingly recurrent from the 1980s to finally become annual since 2005. Alongside the exhibitions, mention should also be made of the presentation of the "Document of the Month," an initiative that started in September 2014 and aimed at presenting any type of documentary unit to the public; the service offered both by archivist officials and, since January 19, 2017, by volunteers from the Italian Touring Club to accompany visitors to get to know both the building and the archival heritage.

At the end of Barbara Bertini's term of office (2011), it was decided to celebrate the centenary of the publication of the first ASMi Yearbook by re-proposing its annual publication with contributions on the state of the Archives' activities and on the research carried out by the Institute's scholars/functions in the fields of history, diplomatics, paleography and archival science.

===== The Cultural Center of the State Archives and Archeion =====
Alongside the institutional activity, beginning with the tenure of Alfio Rosario Natale, parallel groups aimed at supporting the Archives' cultural and scientific initiatives were formed, such as the State Archives Cultural Center in 1957 (active for a few years) and, since May 2000, by the Archeion cultural association, established "with the primary purpose of promoting and supporting the cultural activity of the State Archives of Milan." Archeion, among the various projects approved by the Directorate, stood out for the dissemination and rediscovery of the Latin language "from the classical age to the most recent Ecclesiastical Latin" through a series of meetings of the Insolita itinera project, which started in 2012 and is still active. In this popularizing perspective, Archeion also works to help candidates for admission into the School of Archival Studies, Paleography and Diplomatics to approach medieval Latin, the language they will have to translate in the exam.

== The documentary heritage ==
=== General framework ===
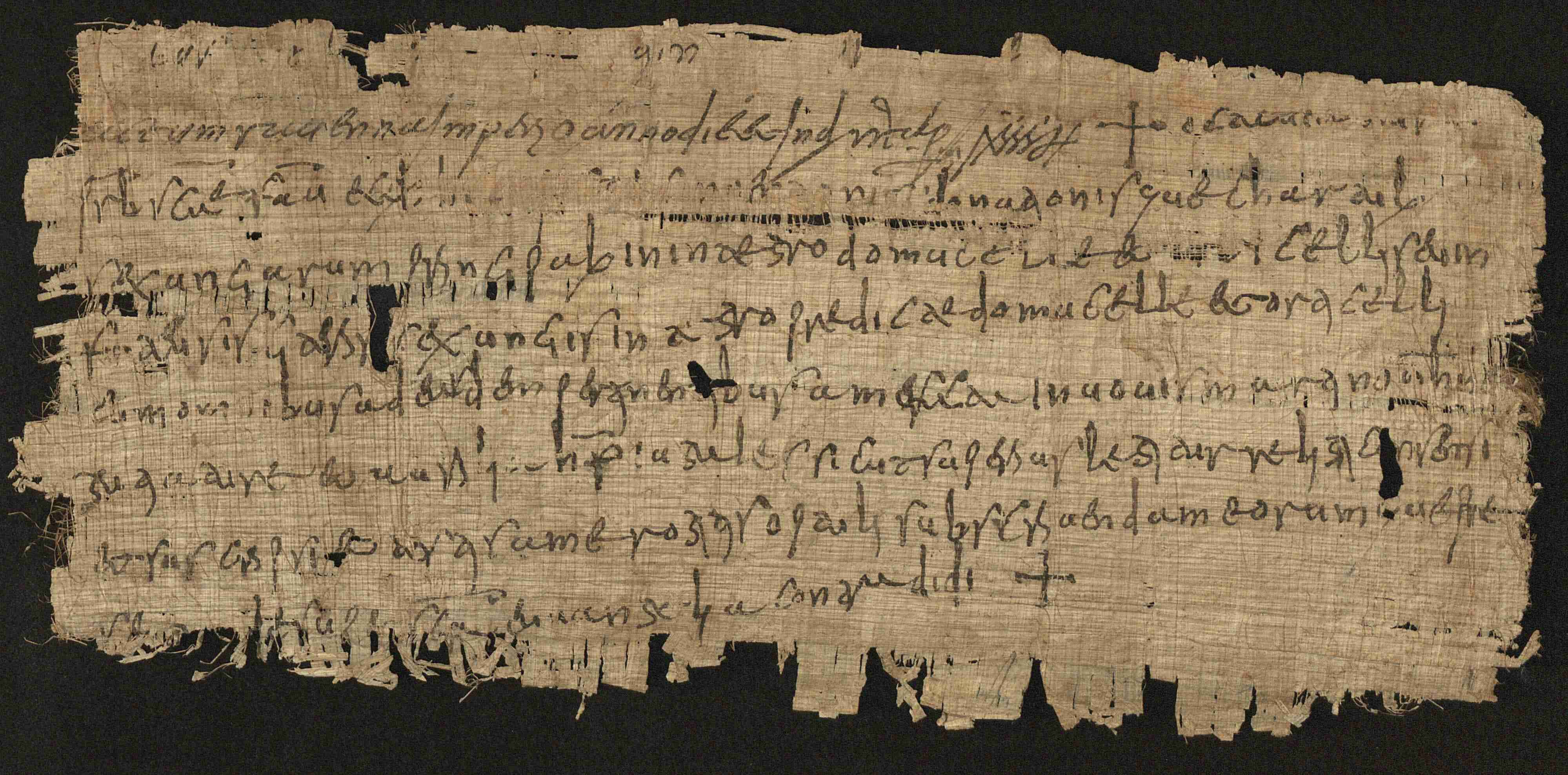
ASMi, Miniatures and Cimeli Fund, cart. 1, piece no. 1, Chartula pacti conventionis donationisque, private document in basic cursive minuscule script, fragment of a 6th-century A.D. Ravenna papyrus (Latin language)

The State Archives of Milan currently cover about 45 km of shelves. It contains 180,000 archival units, 150,000 parchments, more than 76,000 maps and a vast amount of documentation from the Middle Ages to the present day. The oldest parchment document preserved (not only in Milan, but also in the rest of the other State Archives) dates back to May 12, 721 and is entitled "Cartola de accepto mundio." In addition to it, the State Archives of Milan preserves other valuable documentary units gathered in the Relics Fund including:

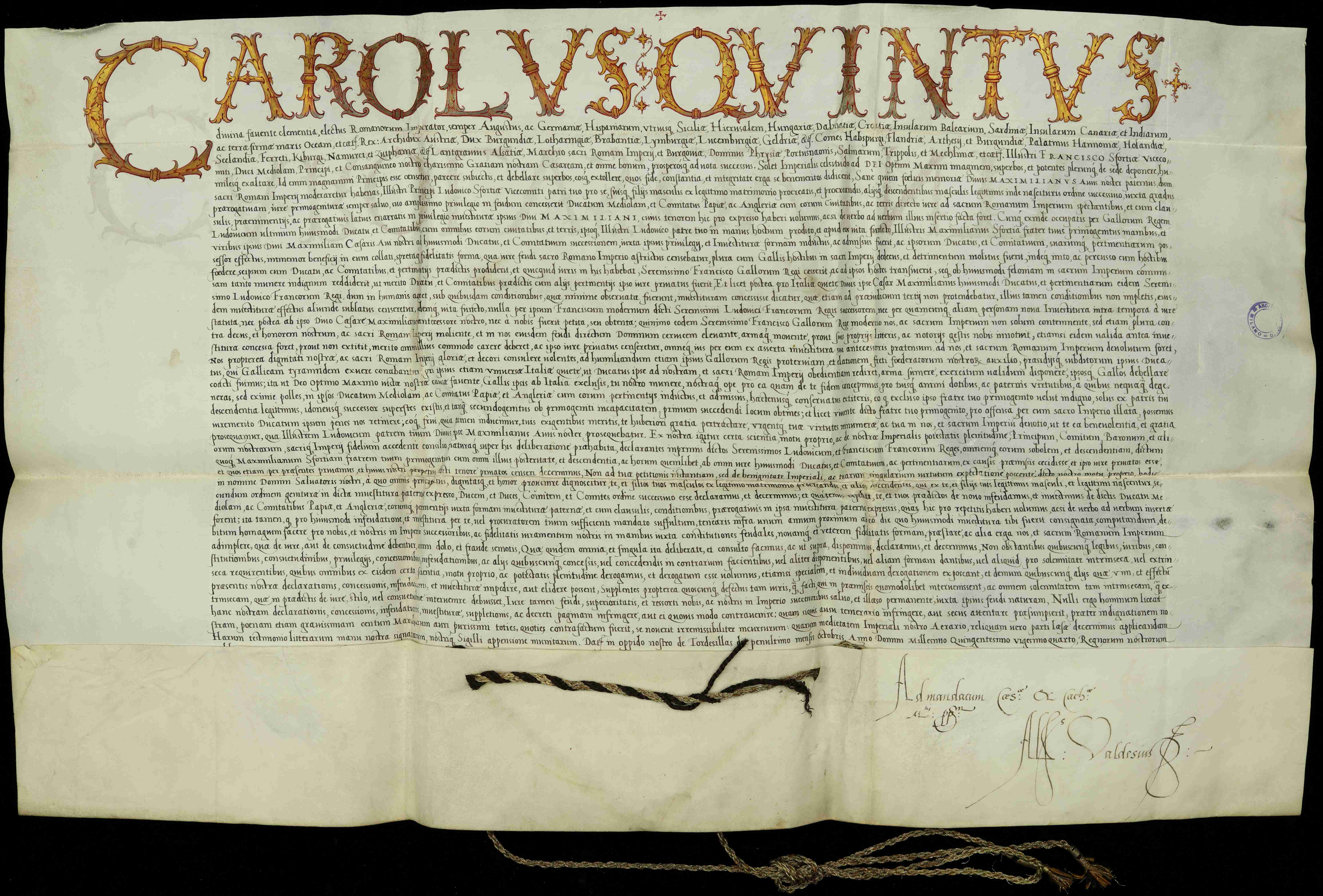
ASMi, Diplomas and Sovereign Dispatches - Germany, vart. 4, Imperial Diploma written in chancery script with a humanistic base, parchment, Diploma of Charles V (also called golden bull): "Charles V grants to Francesco II Sforza the investiture of the Duchy of Milan. Given "in oppido de Tordesillas" (i.e., "in the city of Tordesillas") on October 30, 1524 (Latin language).

- a fragment of a Ravenna papyrus (6th century)
- a letter book of Bernabò Visconti from 1364
- an autograph of Leonardo da Vinci (1482)
- the so-called "golden bull" of Charles V
- Luca Riva's will (1624) (Note: In the section Archives of Milan and its Territory, vol. 2, 1844, the authors report on the story of this mute painter: One curious fact is the will of a mute in 1624, Luca Riva, of the parish of San Vito al Pasquirolo, a thirty-three year old married man, a painter of the school of Procaccini, who wished to dispose of his possessions in charity; but although he knew how to draw, to write his own name, even to write some mottos, and to know the value of numerical figures, he was not able to write a will himself. ...we say that the senate authorised the notary Calchi to draw up the will, in the presence of a judge, a canon, three interpreters, seven witnesses and two prothonotaries [...]. — Litta Modigliani, Bassi & Re (1844, p. 197))
- documents of Napoleon Bonaparte (including the autographed Civil Code)
- a letter written in blood by Silvio Pellico during his imprisonment (1820)

=== The collections and archives ===
The collections stored in the State Archives of Milan are numerous and vary in typology: from Government Acts to the Religion Fund, from the archives of state bodies that are placed there by law to archives of families (for example, the Sormani Andreani Verri Giussani) or of individuals (Antonio Taverna). The exact number of collections can be found on the website of the State Archives Information System (the SIAS), while here are discussed the most significant ones according to the grouping proposed by the General Guide to Italian State Archives:

==== Ancient Regimes ====
The first partition groups together collections and archives of the ancient central and peripheral magistracies present in Milan during the pre-unification period:

===== The Government Acts and the Peronian method =====
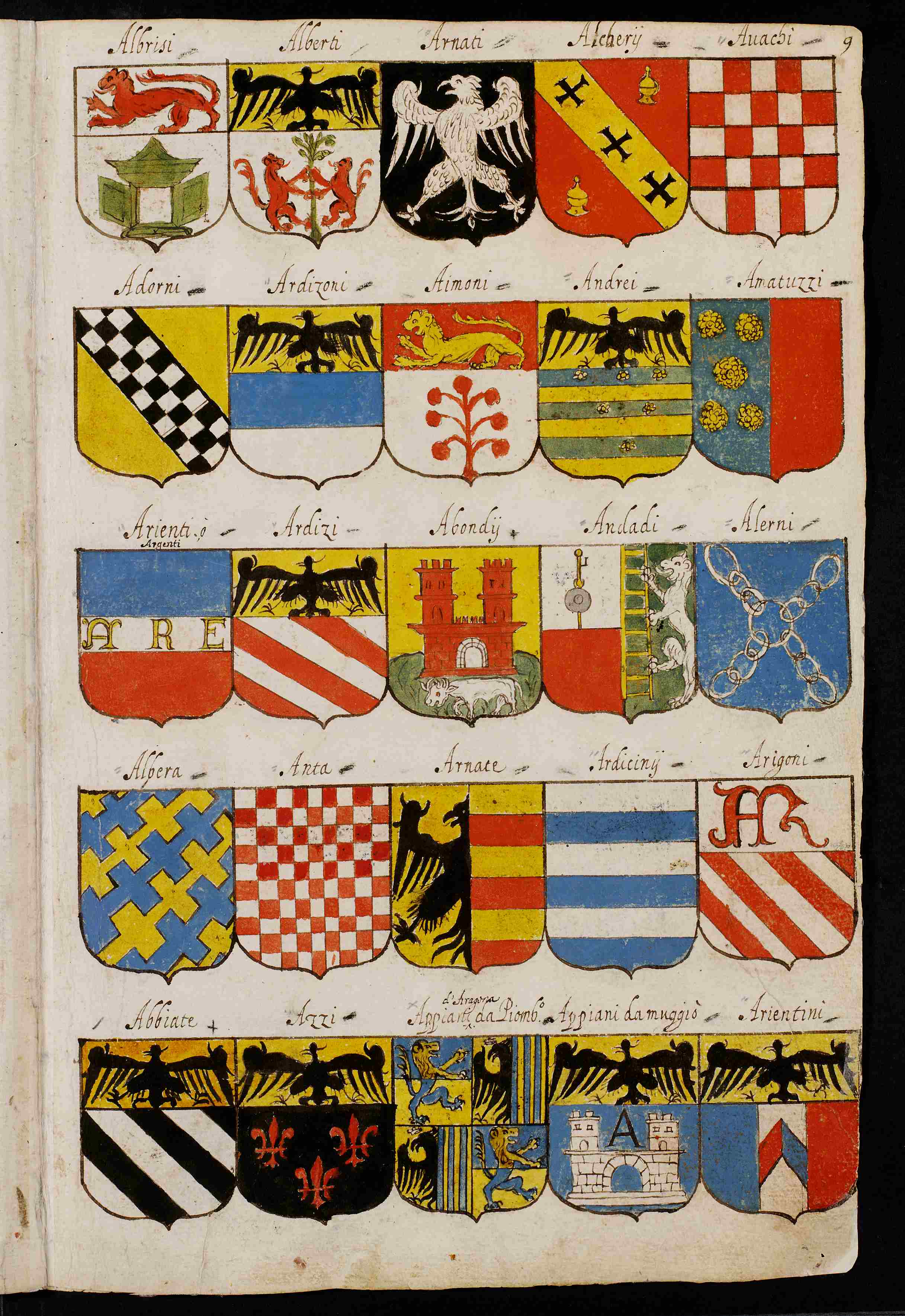
ASMi, Heraldry Registers - Cremosano Heraldic Codex - Coats of arms of Lombard Families, year 1673, by Marco Cremosano (Milan 1611- Milan 1674)

The largest part of the archival holdings are the Government Acts (28,000 folders), that is, all those documents from the Milanese magistracies operating from the Spanish government (1535-1714) to the Austrian magistracies of the Kingdom of Lombardy-Venetia. This collection was created and organized by Luca Peroni (1745-1832), director of the archives during the three-year period 1796-1799 and then from 1818 to 1832. Peroni, moved by the Enlightenment rationalization initiated by Encyclopédie and the classification of the animal and plant world by Carl Linnaeus, proceeded to dismember the original archives and then to select or discard the said papers and finally re-aggregate them according to subject matter. Although this inevitably entailed breaking the archival bond, the Peronian system was introduced as an act of an administrative nature: the adoption of a single criterion of organization by subject matter would allow records to be found quickly and efficiently. Continued by Luigi Osio and partly by Cesare Cantù, this type of reorganization of archival material was opposed by director Luigi Fumi in the early 20th century and then completely abandoned.

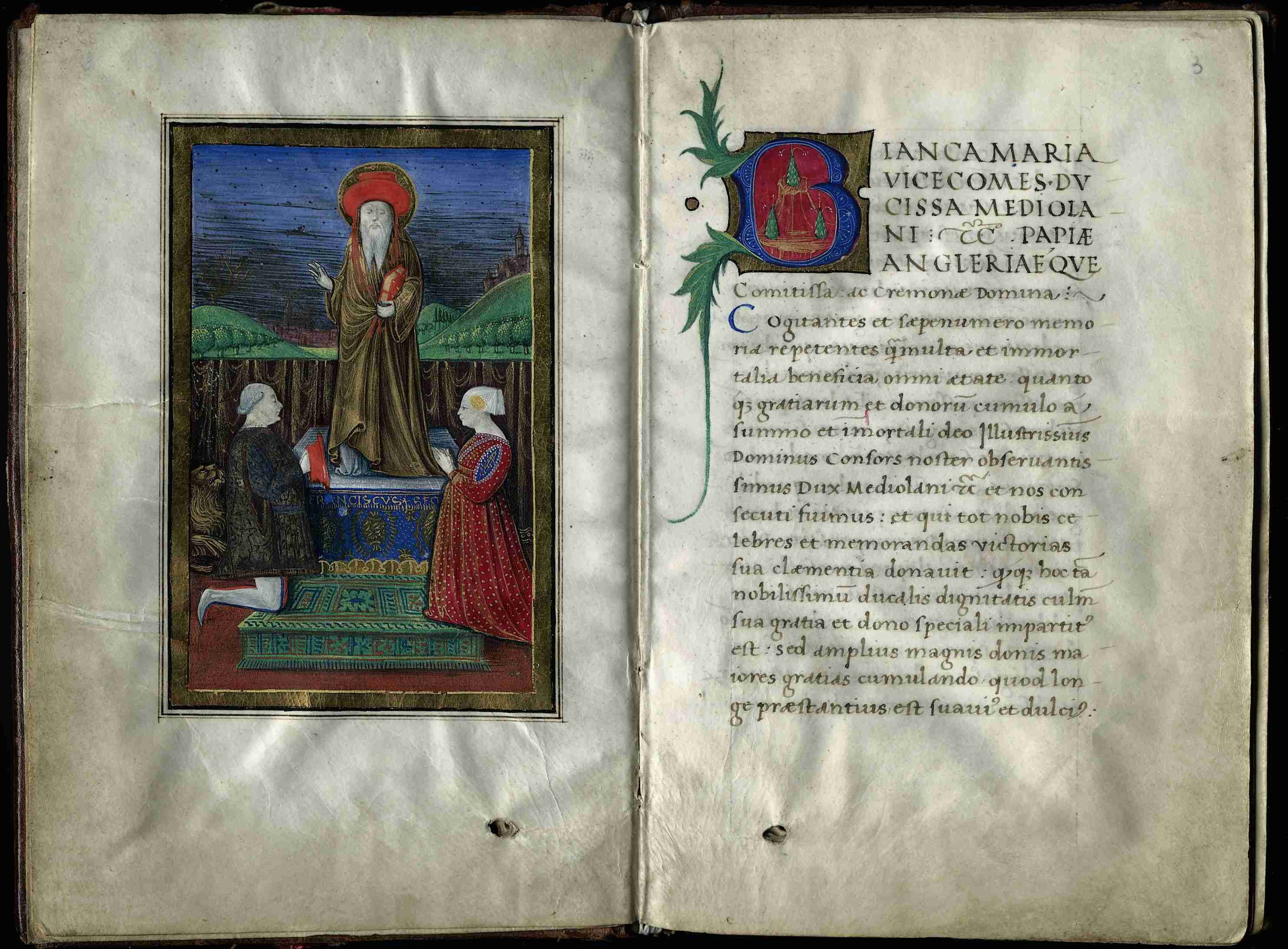
ASMi, Miniatures and Cimeli Fund, cart. 5, fasc. 5 known as Codicetto di Lodi, illuminated membranous codex written in humanistic script, Oct. 15, 1462 (also showing acts ranging from Nov. 25, 1477 to Feb. 11, 1508) (Latin language)

===== The Visconti-Sforza ducal archives and the Spanish-Austrian archives =====
The fruit of the archival reconstruction carried out by Luigi Fumi and Giovanni Vittani was the recataloging of the ancient correspondence relating to the Visconti dynasty first and then the Sforza dynasty, and of the Duchy of Milan under the Spanish and the Austrians. In turn, these archives are divided into series that better delineate the material contained therein. In the case of the Visconti-Sforza archives, there are the Carteggio Visconteo-Sforzesco and the Registri d'età sforzesca; in the case of the Hispanic and Austrian archives, on the other hand, there are the Dispacci sovrani, the Carteggio and the Registri delle Cancellerie dello Stato.

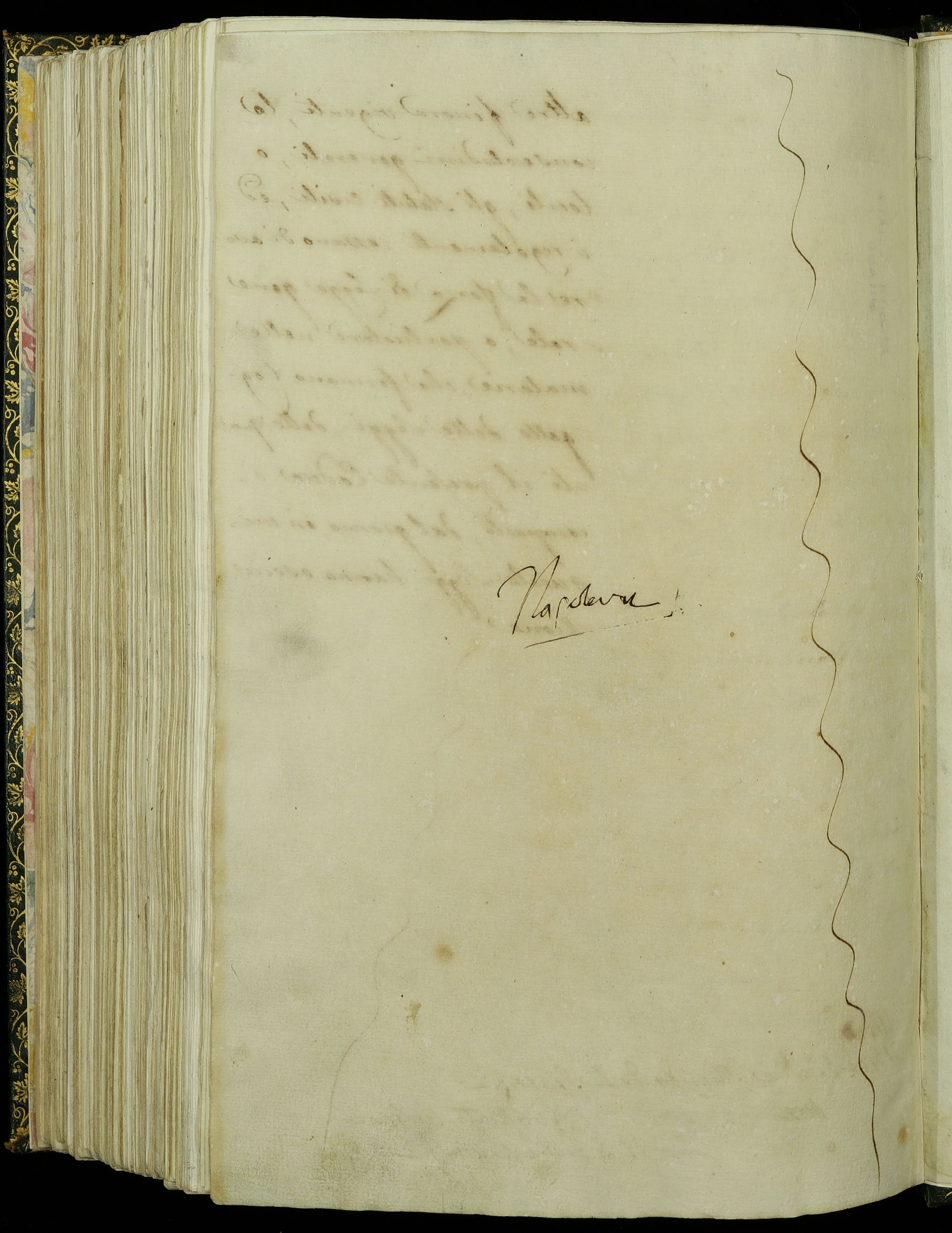
ASMi, Miniatures and Memorabilia Fund, Folder 6, item No. 1, Napoleon's autograph at the end of the paper manuscript volume containing the Italian language edition of the Napoleonic Civil Code dated January 16, 1806, Munich.

===== Napoleonic Archives =====
This designation refers to the archives that came into being and were produced as a result of the political-institutional changes that occurred after the geopolitical restructuring of central and northern Italy first by the French revolutionaries and then by Napoleon Bonaparte. Mention was made in the historical section of the change in the names of the archives established by the Austrians (from General Archives to National Archives), the creation of the archives of the central organs of the state, such as the military archives located in the former Helvetic College (1802) and the archives of the Ministry of Foreign Affairs, comprising material ranging from 1793 to 1814 and divided into the Marescalchi and Testi Archives. In the constitutional changes (from the Italian Republic in 1802 to the Kingdom of Italy in 1805), the republican-era archives merged into the royal-era ones. A large part of the Napoleonic-era archives (the Melzi Vice-Presidency Fund and the Secretariat of State Fund) were then handed over to the Austrians and only in 1919-1920, at the interest of the Italian government, were they returned to the State Archives in Milan.

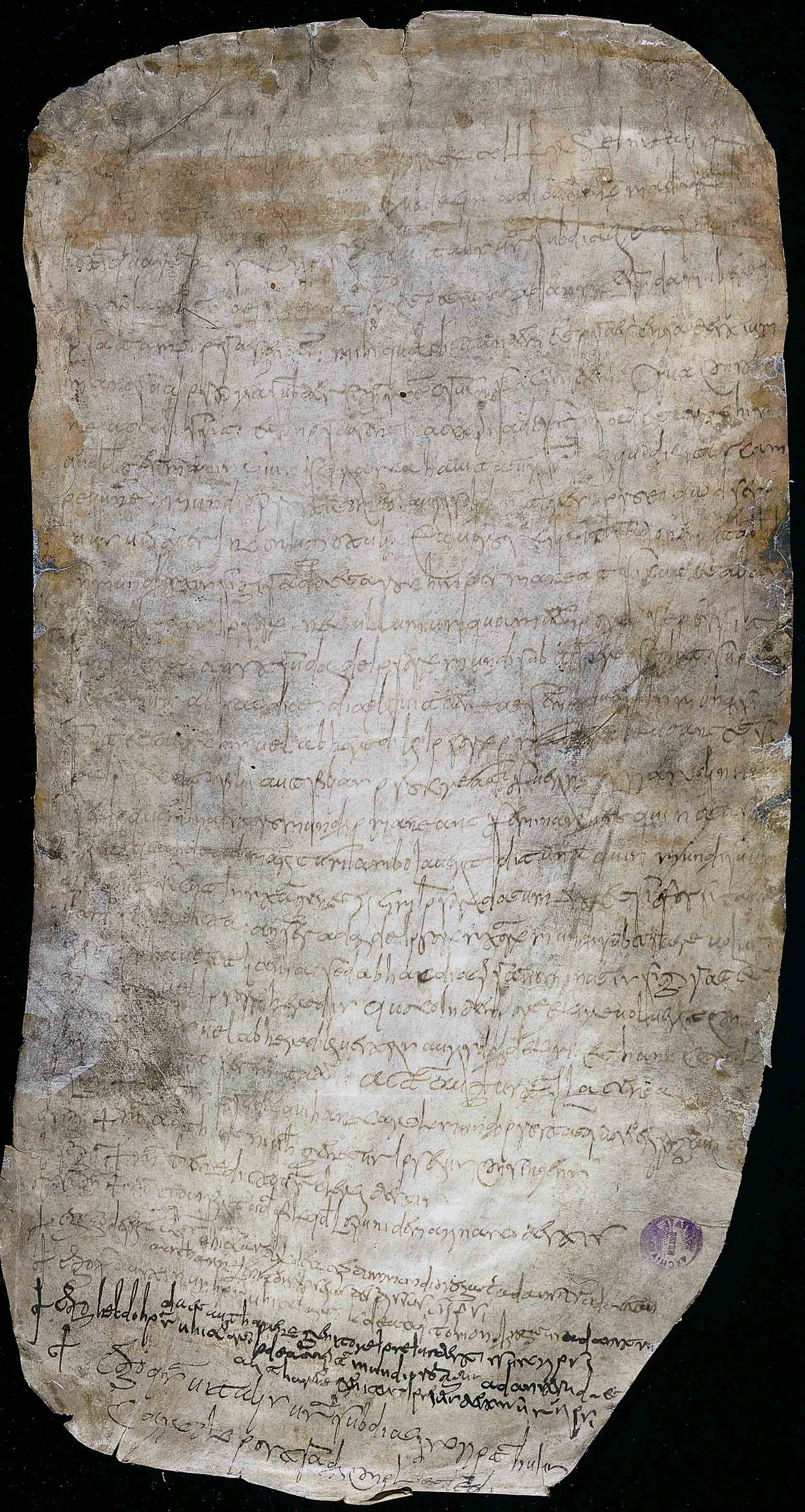
ASMi, Diplomatic Museum, Cartola de Accepto Mundio, cart. 1, fasc. 3. Lombard-era notarial act in new cursive dated May 12, 721 regarding "payment of mundio for the marriage of Anstruda to a servant."

===== Restoration Archives =====
With the return of the Austrians after the Napoleonic era and the establishment of the Kingdom of Lombardy-Venetia with Emperor Francis I of Austria as its sovereign, the so-called Restoration Archives were opened, among which stand out the records relating to the government of the territory, in the hands of the two governors residing in Milan and Venice (Presidency of Government, Austrian Chancelleries); to the activities of Viceroy Rainer representing King and Emperor Francis (Chancery of the Viceroy) and, after the revolutions of 1848, to those of the civil and military government of General Radetzky, collected in the Fondo Governatore generale civile e militare del Regno Lombardo-Veneto. Of relevant interest are the papers grouped in the fund Political Trials, aimed at targeting Carbonari, members of the Mazzinian-inspired Giovine Italia and patriots in general.

===== Diplomatic Archives =====
The diplomatic archives had a history of its own, both in formation and management. Created in 1807 at the behest of Luigi Bossi and with the help of Michele Daverio, the diplomatic archives consisted of the oldest documentary units of the Fondo di Religione (including the Cartola de accepto mundio) and was "based on the scriptural matter used for the documents, thus separating the parchments from the paper part of the archives that were transferred to the Fondo di Religione." Only with the direction of Luigi Osio did the diplomatic archive lose its autonomy, passing under the direction of the archives of San Fedele. At the moment, this archive no longer exists as such, however, the collections: Diplomatic Museum, Diplomas and Sovereign Dispatches, Short Bulls and Parchments for funds still belong to it.

===== Historical section =====
Created by Luigi Osio during his 20-year tenure, the historical section is a miscellany of documents extracted from other archives and funds (Visconti-Sforza archives, diplomatic archives, and those of the Spanish and Austrian Chancelleries) aimed at satisfying a spirit of collecting in vogue at the time. The Autographs, Seals, Municipalities, Families, Relics and Statutes funds are part of this historical section. Osio's operation was blocked and partly repaired by his successors but, despite this, the historical section still exists.

===== The Religion Fund =====
The Religion Fund, an Austrian magistracy established by Joseph II following his suppressions of convents and monasteries, charged with managing the archives of these suppressed institutions as well, continued its work in the Napoleonic era under different names. Having also organized this archive by subject, Luigi Fumi and his immediate successors attempted to bring back the old structure, but the war and the sheer volume that went into making up this fund did not allow the fulfillment of that will. Currently, the Religion Fund is divided into two funds: the Administration of the Religion Fund (2650 folders) and the General Archives of the Religion Fund (6512 folders), with documentary units ranging from the ninth to the eighteenth century.

==== Post-unitary ====
The second partition groups collections and archives of the peripheral magistracies of the post-unification state (including the Judicial Archives, Prefecture, Prisons, Courts, etc...). Among them, the Military Districts Archives preserves for the draft years 1843-1925 rubrics, rolls and matriculation sheets of the districts of Milan, Lodi and Monza transferred to the State Archives after a period of 70 years after the draft class to which they refer.

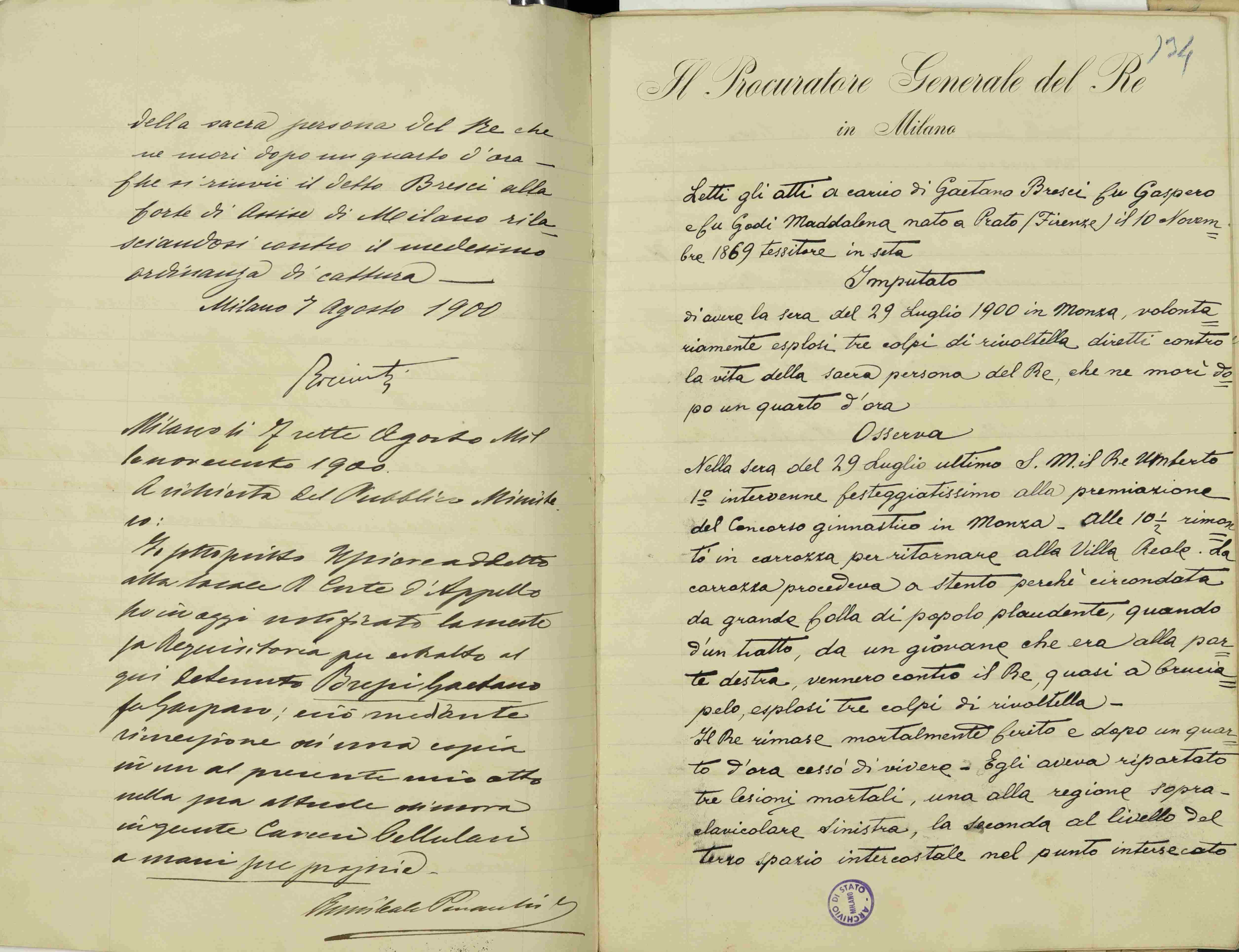
ASMi, Court of Assizes of First Instance - Circle of Milan, Criminal Proceedings against Gaetano Bresci, b. 2, fasc. 121, aa. 1900-1901, folio 134

==== Miscellaneous Archives ====
What does not fit into the antecedent chronological partitions is grouped into the miscellaneous archives partition. The most important ones include:

- The notarial archives, called Public Archives when it was opened by the will of Maria Theresa of Austria in 1765, kept the records of deceased notaries - arranged in chronological order - in the Duchy of Milan. The archive, which was housed in the Broletto nuovo, was administered by a Prefect of Archives until 1944, when its holdings were transferred to the State Archives of Milan. According to Article 11 of Law No. 2006 of December 22, 1939, notarial acts, kept at the end of the activity of a particular notary, from January 1, 1800 must be transferred to the State Archives. This resulted in a significant increase in the amount of material preserved in the years to come. Law 629 of May 17, 1952 stipulated that district notarial archives, after preserving the notarial records of a particular notary for a hundred years from the end of their service, must transfer those records to the State Archives. In Milan, records of notaries are preserved from the 13th century onward, and in total there were 64,166 files as of 2010, taking into account that this fund, like the cadastral fund and from active magistracies, continues to be enriched with new documentation.
  ASMi, Miscellaneous Maps and Drawings Fund (MMD), Rolled 27, 1527, "Confining dispute near Casalmaggiore over alluvial islands on the Po and ice formed by river waters."
- The cadastre fund collects documentation that begins in the 18th century: it goes from the first cadastral censuses operated by Charles VI in 1718 and completed by his daughter Maria Theresa in 1760 (for this reason referred to as the Teresian cadastre) to those carried out between 1839 and 1843 on the territories of Lombardy-Veneto (Lombardy-Veneto cadastre) that were not surveyed a century earlier. Also at the turn of the first and second half of the 19th century, "the recensus of the Lombard provinces of Teresian census ordered in 1854 and activated at various dates after unification until 1888" was carried out. In addition to the cadastral fund, there are also cadastral registers, which supplemented the documentation on the work of land surveyors in land division, and cadastral maps.
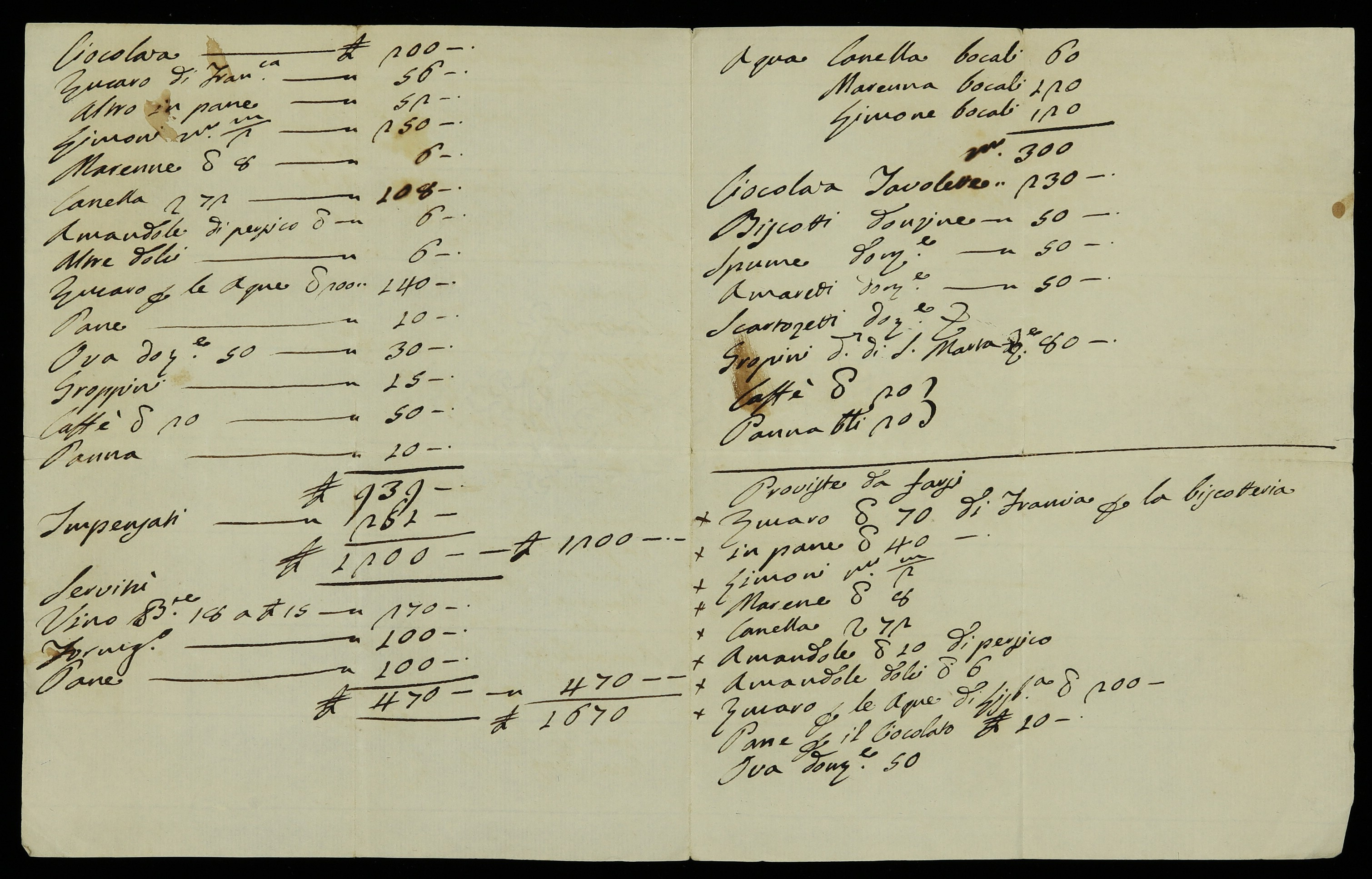
  ASMi, Sormani Giussani Andreani Verri Fund, b. 54 fasc. 1. The back of the document shows the provision of food and various foods for the banquet that took place on March 13, 1784 at Moncucco di Brugherio, in the villa of Count Gian Mario Andreani, to celebrate his brother Paolo's balloon ride, the first to take place on Italian soil.
- The fonds of private provenance: in addition to the institutional producer subjects, there are also private ones (families, individuals), which came to the State Archives of Milan by transfer, donation, commodate or through purchase by the State. In the case of families, worth mentioning was the donation (December 23, 1980) by Countess Luisa Sormani Andreani Verri of the family archival patrimony (Fondo Sormani Giussani Andreani Verri) which, over the course of two centuries, was formed by bringing together the archives of some of the most important Milanese patrician families. In 1997, as far as family archives are concerned, the Taverna Fund, which preserves not only documents related to the family patrimony, but also to the government positions that the family managed to access during the modern age, was transferred to the State Archives of Milan by cession. On the other hand, as far as personal archives are concerned, the Milan State Archives preserves part of the archives of conductor Arturo Toscanini and composer Ottorino Respighi. Private collections also include The Small Purchases, Gifts, Deposits, Claims (PADDR) fund, which, as the name implies includes documents spanning a chronological span from the 12th to the 20th century, dealing with various subjects, and which was established through donations or sales to the State Archives. This fund includes the Clerici Collection, the Dono Cantù, autograph letters of Ludovico il Moro, Charles V and Alessandro Volta, the Dono de Herra (a noble Milanese family), the Christies Auction House containing thirty-eight autograph deeds of Spanish and Austrian governors, and finally some documents concerning the administration of Lombardy-Venetia.
- Archives of public provenance in storage: archives of public provenance are currently stored in the State Archives of Milan. Among the most important are the archives of the Consiglio degli Orphanotrofi and Pio Albergo Trivulzio, whose oldest part (the one before 1825) was deposited in the State Archives in 1977-78 and that of the Lombardy Royal Residences, deposited in 2007, which holds, among others, the Archives of the Royal Villa of Monza.

== The School of Archival Studies, Palaeography and Diplomatics in Milan ==
=== From 1842 to 1874 ===
The subjects taught there are those dealing with the history, classification and varieties of the writings of the past centuries, not to mention the rules for interpreting, appreciating and judging chancery and notarial documents.

— Guida 1853, p. 203

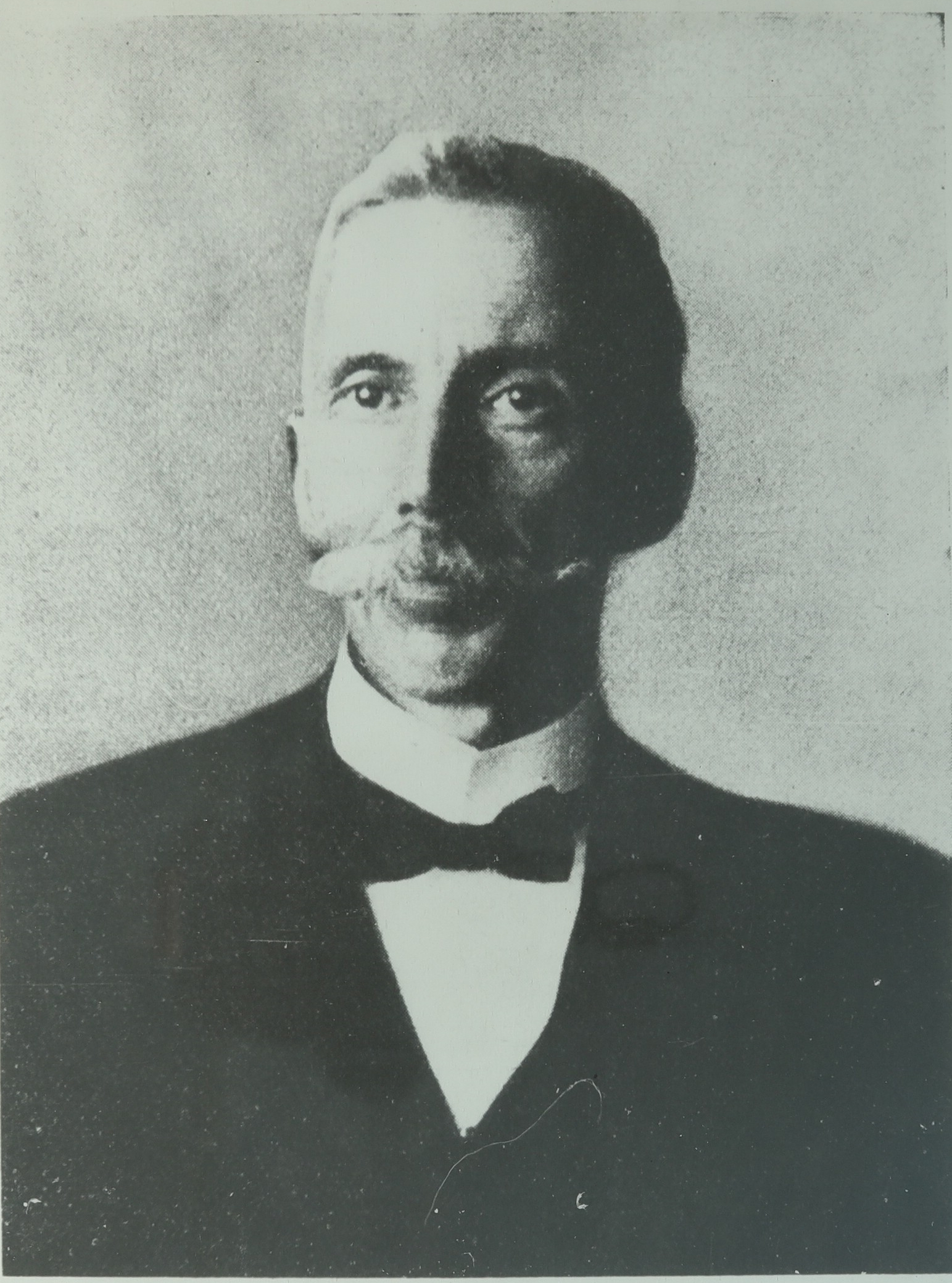
Giovanni Vittani, distinguished archivist, director of the School of Archivistics, Paleography and Diplomatics in Milan under the tenure of Luigi Fumi (as well as his successor in the direction of ASMi) and author of the Prolusions of the same School.

The School of Archivistics, Paleography and Diplomatics (APD) is one of seventeen schools in Italy aimed at training future specialists in the aforementioned subjects. As for the Milanese case, it was founded under the name School of Diplomatic-Paleographic Institutions in 1842 at the behest of director Giuseppe Viglezzi and was entrusted to the care of Giuseppe Cossa and Luigi Ferrario, the first employee of the Diplomatic Archives. The classes, which were held in 1847 at the headquarters of the Diplomatic Archives in Piazza de' Mercanti at no. 3091, were transferred in 1853 to a classroom of the Imperial-Regia Direzione Generale degli Archivi Governativi, which was located in Contrada della Sala at no. 956. The school continued its activities (even though it had to be financed by the Royal Treasury "for the purchase of appropriate scientific works") at this location until 1859, when it was merged with the Scientific-Literary Academy by law on November 23, 1859: the only teacher was Giuseppe Cossa, who was active in this institution, moreover, until 1863. Damiano Muoni, archivist at the General Directorate of Archives, points out that the school activity ended precisely from July 1863 (that is, when Cossa left office) until November 1871, when it was restored by director Luigi Osio. For a very short time the school was entrusted to Cossa's former assistant, Luigi Ferrario, but he died "a few days after his speech of prolusion", which is why Osio entrusted the chair to Pietro Ghinzoni (assisted by Giuseppe Porro, later his successor) starting in 1872. However, in the legislation of the new unified state, the school was officially established in 1874 by royal decree March 26, 1861, and classes were held in four hours a week ("on non-holiday Mondays and Thursdays") and were accompanied by paleographic, diplomatic and archival exercises.

== The School during the Kingdom of Italy and the Republic ==
=== From Cantù to Vittani ===
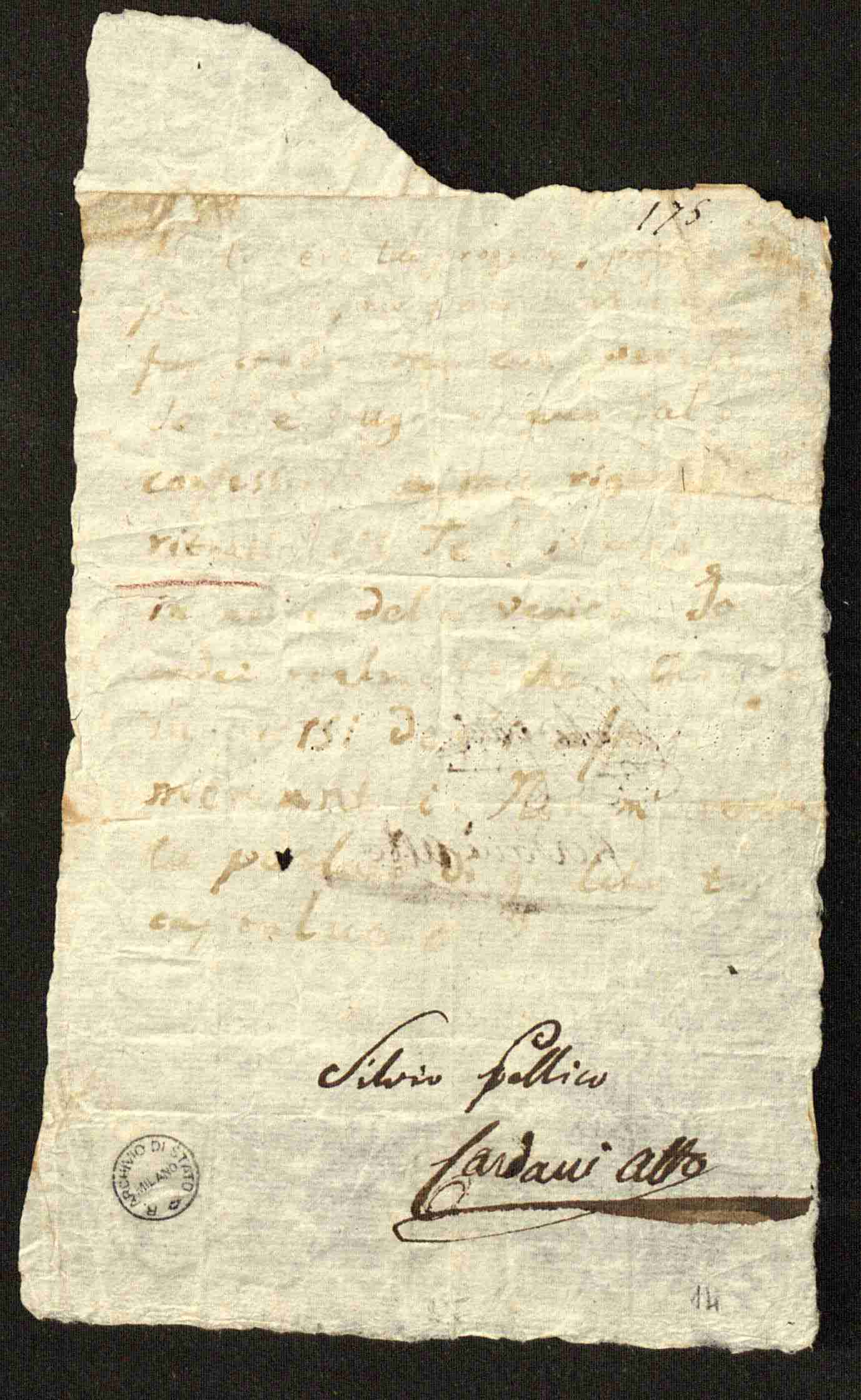
ASMi, Miniatures and Memorabilia Fund, folder 3, no. 14, paper, "Note written in his own blood by Silvio Pellico, and attached to the report of the custodian under arrest Angelo Calvi," Milan October 17, 1820

In the years following 1874, the School of Paleography and Diplomatics, which from 1879 changed its name to become the School of Paleography and Archival Studies, and in 1883 was finally moved from San Fedele to the Senate Palace, was directed successively by Pietro Ghinzoni (1872-1874) and Giuseppe Porro (1874-1895) according to an empirical methodology ("eminently practical", in the words of Cesare Cantù) (Note: Corrispondenza milanese (1873, p. 594): In the State Archives of Milan, directed by Mr. Cantù himself, the course of Palaeography and Diplomatics was closed this month and examinations were taken by those attending the school. Mr Cantù found that the nature of this institution was eminently practical, since the school was intended to train not scholars but archivists, and therefore did not insist much on the theoretical part in the examinations.) but unrelated to the scientific innovations of these two sciences that were spreading in Europe at the time. For this reason Cantù's successor, Count Ippolito Malaguzzi Valeri (1899-1905) insisted on a renewal of the curriculum studiorum, but his untimely death did not give him time to make these changes.

In the 20th century, an important role for the school was played by Malaguzzi Valeri's two successors, namely Luigi Fumi first and Giovanni Vittani later, who, through the founding of the Yearbook and the modernization/internationalization of the curriculum studiorum, allowed the "Milanese school from 1908 to 1935 [to be] considered of university level, an exceptional case among Italian archival schools." Giovanni Vittani, assisted in this by archivist Giuseppe Bonelli and Cesare Manaresi, introduced the principles of archival science formulated in the late 19th century by the Dutchmen Muller, Fait and Fruin, whose manual was first printed in Italy in Turin in 1908. Famous were the prolusions that Vittani gave at the beginning of the academic year not only to the school but also to the Milanese cultural elite and which were later included in the Yearbook promoted by Fumi. Under Vittani's tenure, the school (which at the time had the name School of Paleography, Diplomatics and Archival Doctrine) was directed by Cesare Manaresi.

=== Natale's teaching and the last decades ===
When Manaresi in 1938 retired from his service as a civil servant at ASMi to accept the teaching of paleography and diplomatics at the University of Milan, the future director Alfio Rosario Natale was first an assistant in the School and then became, from 1947, first the holder of the chair of paleography and finally, from 1949, also of those of archival and diplomatic studies. Years later, when Natale, by then director, published the archival, paleographic and diplomatic edition of the Diplomatic Museum on the German model of the Monumenta Germaniae Historica Society (1970), the director intended that this "method should be transmitted to the students", thus indicating a modernization of the School's studies to bring them closer to European sensibilities.

From the 1980s to the present day, the study of the three traditional subjects was also joined by that of cultural heritage legislation (which found its final canonization with Minister Urbani and the related 2004 decree, later merged into the Code of Cultural Heritage and Landscape) and, with the development of computer technologies, that of computer archival science, a science that was born in the middle of the decade and began to spread in Italy through the Conference "Informatics and Archives," held in Turin in 1985; and the journal Archivi & computer.

== Directors ==
Director	Tenure		Notes
Director	From	To	Notes
Ilario Corte	1781	1786	Traditionally considered the first "director of the State Archives of Milan," an applicator of the subject method.
Bartolomeo Sambrunico	1786	1796	Former director of the Mantua Chamber Archives.
Luca Peroni	1796	1799	He further extended the Court method, giving origin to the one that would bear his name.
Bartolomeo Sambrunico	1799	1800	
Luigi Bossi Visconti	1800	1814	General Prefect of the Kingdom Archives, founder of the Diplomatic Museum together with Michele Daverio.
Bartolomeo Sambrunico	1814	1818	
Luca Peroni	1818	1832	
Giuseppe Viglezzi	1832	1851	Founder of the School of Diplomatic Paleographic Institutions.
Luigi Osio	1851	1873	He transported the various archives scattered around Milan to the Senate Palace, placing the Archives in its current location.
Cesare Cantù	1873	1895 (Note: Cantù died in 1895, not 1899. Cf. Marino Berengo (1975). "Cesare Cantù". Dizionario Biografico degli Italiani (in Italian). Vol. 18: Canella–Cappello. Rome: Istituto dell'Enciclopedia Italiana. ISBN 978-88-12-00032-6. The period of vacancy, which lasted four years between 1895 and 1899, was due to the attempt by the Superior Council for Archives to find a person, firstly, who was internal to the archives (session of 27 June 1896; session of 8 July 1897); secondly, who was able to skilfully reorganise the various archival fonds left in disarray by Cantù (session of 20 and 21 March 1898). Cf. Atti delle sedute tra 1896 e 1898.)	A distinguished man of letters, founder of the journal "Historical Archives of Lombardy," he was the first to hold the title of Director of the State Archives of Milan (since 1875).
Ippolito Malaguzzi Valeri	1899	1905	A former founder of the Reggio Emilia State Archives, he was called to Milan to sort out the funds left in disarray by Cantù.
Guido Colombo	02/02/1905	16/06/1907 (Note: Guido Colombo was regent for the ASMi following the death of Malaguzzi Valeri (so in the 11 March 1905 meeting of the Council of Archives) for 'a good two and a half years' (Vittani (1920, p. 68)), i.e. from 2 February 1905 (i.e. the day after Malaguzzi Valeri's death) until 16 June 1907, when Luigi Fumi was appointed director.)	(regent)
Luigi Fumi	17/06/1907	01/06/1920	He took up Malaguzzi Valeri's wish to introduce the historical method of Dutch archivists in Milan. He brought ASMi to the national level through the collaboration of Giovanni Vittani and by publishing the Yearbook in the 1910s.
Giovanni Vittani	1920	1938	Former coordinator of the Milanese APD School, he was a valuable continuator of Fumi's work. Translator, with Giuseppe Bonelli, of the Manual of Dutch Archivists (1908).
Guido Manganelli	1938	1956	Director of the Archives during World War II. He denounced the losses suffered during the conflict and was the initiator of the reconstruction work of the Archives.
Alfio Rosario Natale	14/04/1956	01/06/1974	A distinguished paleographer and diplomatist, Natale lifted the fortunes of ASMi after the wartime interlude by sponsoring studies and enhancement of the Institute nationally and internationally.
Leonardo Mazzoldi	1975	1976	
Carlo Paganini	1976	1987	
Gabriella Cagliari Poli	1987	1997	
Maria Barbara Bertini	01/12/1997	19/04/2012	20/04/2012 - 24/08/2012 (ad interim)
Paola Caroli	20/04/2012	08/03/2015	
Daniela Ferrari	09/03/2015	14/11/2015	
Maurizio Savoja	16/11/2015	15/02/2016	(ad interim)
Benedetto Luigi Compagnoni	16/02/2016	14/10/2018	First term.
Annalisa Rossi	15/10/2018	14/04/2019	(ad interim) She concurrently served as director of the Archival and Bibliographic Superintendence of Lombardy since 1/6/2018.
Benedetto Luigi Compagnoni	15/04/2019	1/5/2023	Second term.
Annalisa Rossi	1/5/2023	present	

== See also ==
- Palazzo del Senato (Milan)
- History of Milan
- Milan

== Bibliography ==
- Bernini, Daniela; Regina, Marina (2004). "Consiglio degli Orfanotrofi e del Pio Albergo Trivulzio". LombardiaBeniCulturali.
- Bertini, Maria Barbara; Valori, Martina (2001). Archivio di Stato di Milano. Viterbo: Betagamma.
- Brunoni, Elisa. "Archivio di Stato di Milano". Cendari. Archived from the original on 21 June 2018.
- Cagliari Poli, Gabriella, ed. (1992). L'archivio di Stato di Milano. Firenze: Nardini Editore. The following chapters were considered:
  - Bortolotti, Maria Pia. "L'archivio diplomatico". In Cagliari Poli (1992), pp. 41–46.
  - Osimo, Alba. "Il Fondo di religione". In Cagliari Poli (1992), pp. 89–92.
  - Auciello, Fiammetta. "Gli Archivi napoleonici". In Cagliari Poli (1992), pp. 101–105.
  - Savoja, Maurizio. "Il fondo catasto". In Cagliari Poli (1992), pp. 109–113.
  - Paganini, Carlo. "Il Collegio Elvetico". In Cagliari Poli (1992), pp. 139–148.
  - Della Torre, Stefano. "L'archivio edificato dell'architettura milanese". In Cagliari Poli (1992), pp. 173–206.
- Calasso, Francesco (1958). Enciclopedia del diritto. Vol. 2. Milano: Giuffrè.
- Carlone, Mariagrazia (May 2010). "Respighi". LombardiaBeniCulturali.
- Carlone, Mariagrazia (2015). "Il Fondo Toscanini all'Archivio di Stato di Milano". Fonti Musicali Italiane (20). ISSN 1594-7963.
- Cassetti, Maurizio, ed. (2008). Repertorio del personale degli Archivi di Stato (PDF). Vol. 1 (1861-1918). Roma: Ministero dei Beni e attività culturali. Archived from the original (PDF) on 21 September 2016.
- L.C. (June 1873). "Corrispondenza milanese - 15 luglio 1873". La Rivista Europea. 3 (1). Firenze: Tipografia dell'Associazione: 593–594. OCLC 869881894.
- Gamba, Ermis (1 September 2009). "Taverna". LombardiaBeniCulturali.
- Ghinzoni, Pietro (1876). "Cronaca semestrale dell'Archivio di Stato di Milano". Archivio Storico Lombardo. 3. Milano: Libreria Editrice G. Brigola: 652–656. ISSN 0392-0232.
- Giacomo Gorrini (1934). "Luigi Fumi". Archivio Storico Italiano. 92 (2): 333–334. ISSN 0391-7770.
- Guerrini Ferri, Gemma (2007). "MANARESI, Cesare Augusto". Dizionario Biografico degli Italiani (in Italian). Vol. 68: Malatacca–Mangelli. Rome: Istituto dell'Enciclopedia Italiana. ISBN 978-88-12-00032-6.
- Lanzini, Marco (2013). L'Archivio di Stato di Milano e i suoi fondi durante la Seconda guerra mondiale nelle carte di Guido Manganelli. Milano: Archivio di Stato di Milano. pp. 241–259.
- Litta Modigliani, Lorenzo; Bassi, Carlo; Re, Antonio, eds. (1844). "Archivii, biblioteche, musei e collezioni". Milano e il suo territorio. Vol. 2. Milano: Pirola. pp. 185–199. (Pages indicate the section referring to the archives in Milan)
- Liva, Giovanni (2014). "L'Archivio di Stato di Milano". In Barbara Bertini e Vincenza Petrilli (ed.). I Custodi della memoria. L'edilizia archivistica italiana statale del XX secolo. Sant'Arcangelo di Romagna: Maggioli Editore. pp. 280–284. ISBN 978-88-916-0835-2.
- Mombelli Castracane, Mirella (1993). "L'archivistica tra storia e informatica". Archivio Storico Italiano. 151 (1): 259–309. ISSN 0391-7770.
- Monti, Annamaria (2001). I formulari del Senato di Milano, secoli XVI-XVIII. Milano: Giuffrè.
- Muoni, Damiano (1874). Archivi di Stato in Milano : Prefetti o direttori, 1468-1874. Note sull'origine, formazione e concentramento di questi ed altri simili istituti. Con un cenno sulle particolari collezioni dell'autore. Milano: Tipografia C. Molinari e C.
- Natale, Alfio Rosario, ed. (1976). L'Archivio di Stato di Milano - Guide e Cronache dell'Ottocento. Vol. 1. Milano: Cisalpino-Goliardica.
- Natale, Alfio Rosario (1983). Piero D'Angiolini; Claudio Pavone (eds.). L'Archivio di Stato di Milano. Vol. II. Roma: Ministero per i Beni Culturali e Ambientali, Ufficio Centrale per i Beni Archivistici. pp. 887–991.
- Petrilli, Vincenza (2011). ""Alcuni libri tecnici". Appunti sulla nascita e sul patrimonio antico della Biblioteca dell'Archivio di Stato di Milano". Annuario dell'Archivio di Stato di Milano. 1. Milano: Archivio di Stato di Milano: 107–136.
- Piano, Pierluigi (2014). "Note di postfazione al saggio di Alfio R. Natale: Annotazioni sull'Archivio Visconteo-Sforzesco". In Roberto Maestri; Pierluigi Piano (eds.). Facino Cane: sagacia e astuzia nei travagli d'Italia tra fine Trecento e inizio Quattrocento. Circolo culturale I Marchesi del Monferrato. pp. 313–334.
- Raponi, Nicola (August 1971). "Per la storia dell'archivio di stato di Milano. Erudizione e cultura nell'Annuario del Fumi (1909-1919)". Rassegna degli Archivi di Stato. 31 (2). Roma: Istituto Poligrafico dello Stato, Libreria dello Stato: 313–334. ISSN 0037-2781.
- Sandulli, Maria Alessandra, ed. (2012). Codice dei beni culturali e del paesaggio (2nd ed.). Milano: Giuffrè Editore. ISBN 978-88-14-16068-4.
- Santoro, Carmela. "Archivio di Stato di Milano, Milano (MI)".
- Santoro, Carmela (2007). "Residenze reali lombarde". LombardiaBeniCulturali.
- Santoro, Carmela (March 2010). "Notarile di Milano". LombardiaBeniCulturali.
- Santoro, Carmela (2011). "Una casa di vetro per il mondo degli studiosi". Il Regio Archivio di Stato in Milano nell'Annuario di Luigi Fumi. Milano: Archivio di Stato di Milano. pp. 3–53.
- Signori, Mario (2011). Il Portale Atl@nte dei Catasti Storici e delle Carte Topografiche della Lombardia. Milano: Archivio di Stato di Milano. pp. 243–254.
- Spreti, Vittorio (1929). Enciclopedia storico-nobiliare italiana : famiglie nobili e titolate viventi riconosciute dal R. governo d'Italia compresi: città, comunità, mense vescovili, abazie, parrocchie ed enti nobili e titolati riconosciuti. Vol. 2. Milano: Enciclopedia storico-nobiliare italiana.
- Stocchi, Natalia. Gamba, Ermis (ed.). "Sormani Giussani Andreani Verri". LombardiaBeniCulturali.
- Terreni, Andrea (2011). Gli Amici dell'Archivio di Stato di Milano. Milano: Archivio di Stato di Milano. pp. 255–261.
- Terreni, Andrea (2015). Archeion per la lingua latina: Insolita itinera, il latino in archivio. Milano: Archivio di Stato di Milano. pp. 261–271.
- Vittani, Giovanni (1920). "Guido Colombo" (PDF). Gli Archivi Italiani (1–2): 66–69. Archived from the original (PDF) on 20 October 2016.
- Guida di Milano. Milano: Presso Giovanni Bernardoni di Giovanni. 1847.
- Guida di Milano. Milano: Presso Giovanni Bernardoni di Giovanni. 1848.
- Guida di Milano. Milano: presso Bernardoni Giuseppe. 1853.
- Guida di Milano. Milano: presso Bernardoni Giuseppe. 1855.
- Guida di Milano. Milano: Giuseppe Bernardoni. 1860.
- Guida di Milano. Milano: Giuseppe Bernardoni. 1861.
- Guida di Milano. Milano: Giuseppe Bernardoni. 1863.
- Guida di Milano. Milano: presso Bernardoni Giuseppe. 1872.
- Guida di Milano. Milano: presso Bernardoni Giuseppe. 1879.
- San Carlo e il suo tempo: atti del Convegno internazionale nel IV centenario della morte: (Milano, 21-26 maggio 1984) (in Italian and French). Vol. 2. Roma: Edizioni di storia e letteratura. 1986.
- "Archivio di Stato Milanese". Archivio Storico Lombardo. 1 (4). Milano: Libreria Editrice G. Brigola: 65–69. December 1874. ISSN 0392-0232.
