= Anachronism =

Chronological inconsistency

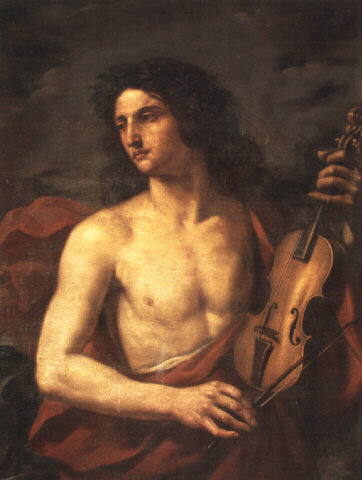
Orpheus, an Ancient Greek depicted with a violin (invented in the 16th century) rather than a lyre. A 17th-century painting by Cesare Gennari.

An anachronism (from the Greek ἀνά ana, 'against' and χρόνος khronos, 'time') is a chronological inconsistency in some arrangement, especially a juxtaposition of people, events, objects, language terms and customs from different time periods. The most common type of anachronism is an object misplaced in time, but it may be a verbal expression, a technology, a philosophical idea, a musical style, a material, a plant or animal, a custom, or anything else associated with a particular period that is placed outside its proper temporal domain.

An anachronism may be either intentional or unintentional. Intentional anachronisms may be introduced into a literary or artistic work to help a contemporary audience engage more readily with a historical period. Anachronism can also be used intentionally for purposes of rhetoric, propaganda, comedy, or shock. Unintentional anachronisms may occur when a writer, artist, or performer is unaware of differences in technology, terminology and language, customs and attitudes, or even fashions between different historical periods and eras.

== Types ==
The metachronism-prochronism contrast is nearly synonymous with parachronism-anachronism, and involves postdating-predating respectively.

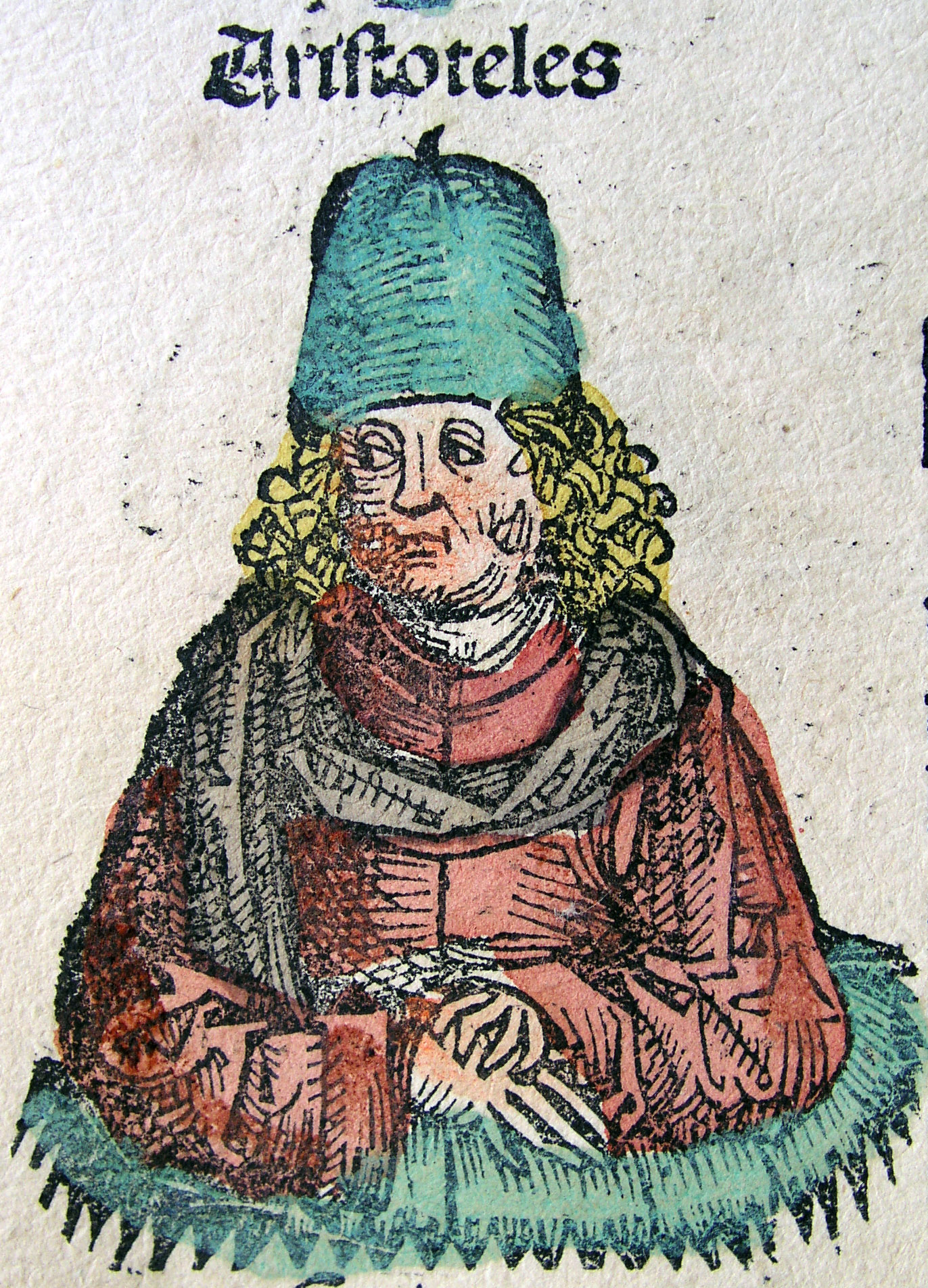
The Nuremberg Chronicle (1493) shows ancient Greek philosopher Aristotle in scholar's clothing of the book's time, 1,800 years too modern for Aristotle.

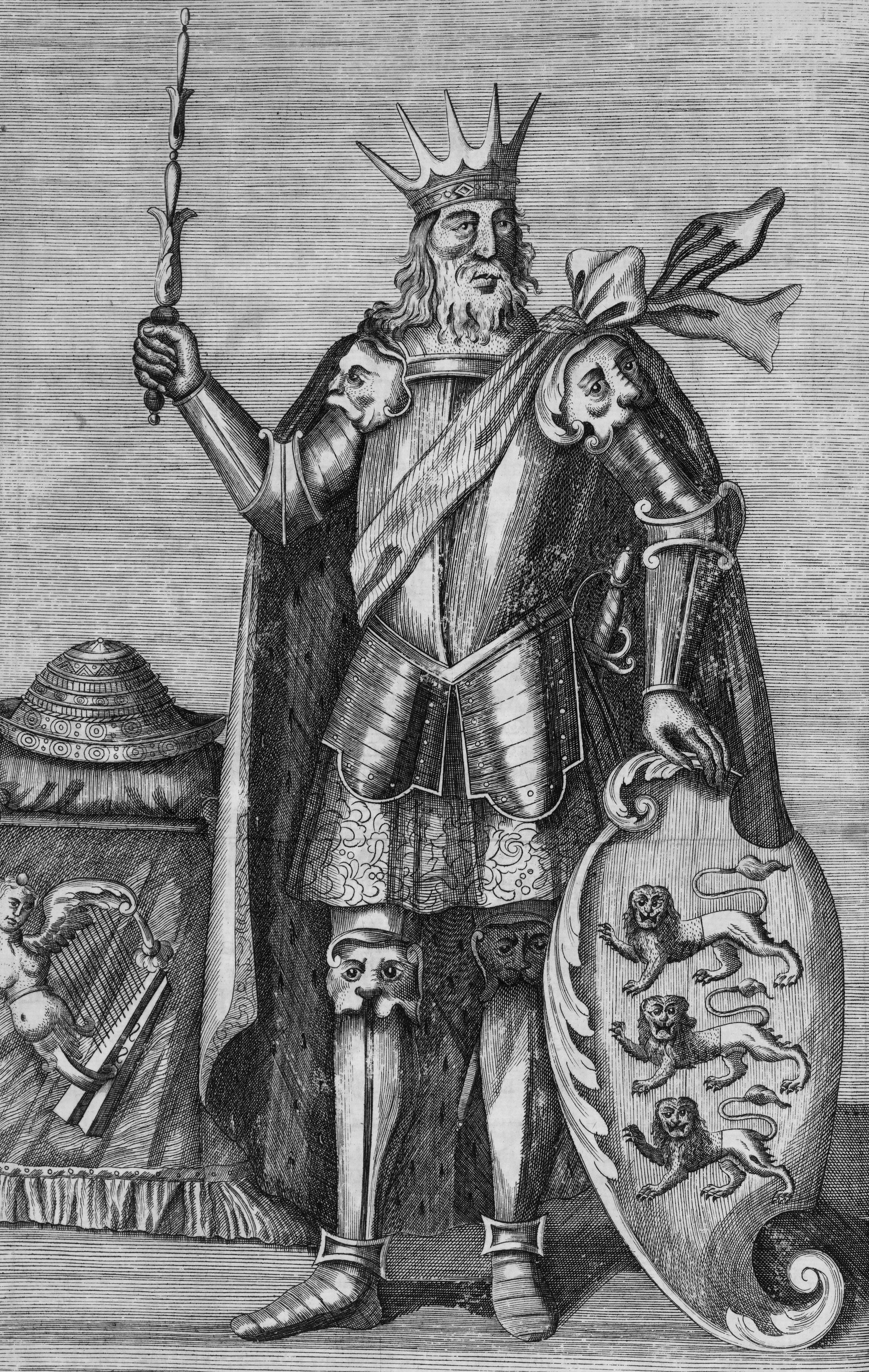
1723 depiction of the Irish High King Brian Boru (died 1014) showing him wearing plate armor (developed in the 15th century) and holding a coat of arms (only introduced after the late 1200s Anglo-Norman invasion). In the background is the green harp flag (first used in 1642) and the Comerford Crown, which dates from the Bronze Age.

=== Parachronism ===
A parachronism (from the Greek παρά, "on the side", and χρόνος, "time") postdates or predates. It is anything that appears in a time period in which it is not normally found (though not sufficiently out of place as to be impossible).

This may be an object, idiomatic expression, technology, philosophical idea, musical style, material, custom, or anything else so closely bound to a particular time period as to seem strange when encountered in a later era. They may be objects or ideas that were once common but are now considered rare or inappropriate. They can take the form of obsolete technology or outdated fashion or idioms.

=== Prochronism ===
A prochronism (from the Greek πρό, "before", and χρόνος, "time") predates. It is an impossible anachronism which occurs when an object or idea has not yet been invented when the situation takes place, and therefore could not have possibly existed at the time. A prochronism may be an object not yet developed, a verbal expression that had not yet been coined, a philosophy not yet formulated, a breed of animal not yet evolved or bred, or use of a technology that had not yet been created.

=== Metachronism ===
A metachronism (from the Greek μετά, "after", and χρόνος, "time") postdates. It is the use of older cultural artifacts in modern settings which may seem inappropriate. For example, it could be considered metachronistic for a modern-day person to be depicted wearing a top hat or writing with a quill.

== Politically motivated anachronism ==
Works of art and literature promoting a political, nationalist or revolutionary cause may use anachronism to depict an institution or custom as being more ancient than it actually is, or otherwise intentionally blur the distinctions between past and present. For example, the 19th-century Romanian painter Constantin Lecca depicts the peace agreement between Ioan Bogdan Voievod and Radu Voievod—two leaders in Romania's 16th-century history—with the flags of Moldavia (blue-red) and of Wallachia (yellow-blue) seen in the background. These flags date only from the 1830s: this anachronism promotes legitimacy for the unification of Moldavia and Wallachia into the Kingdom of Romania at the time the painting was made.

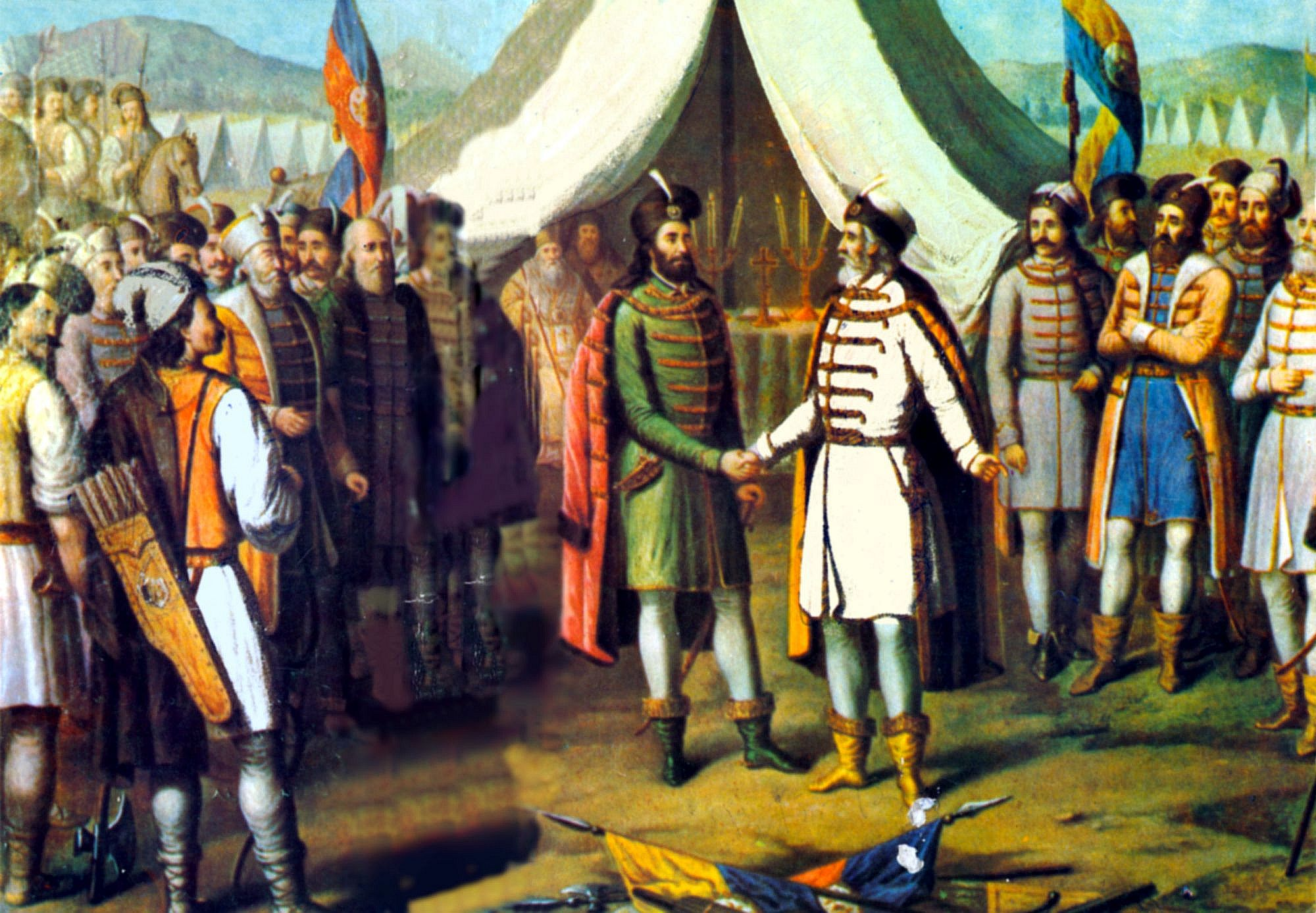
Moldavians and Muntenians become Brothers: 19th-century flags in a 16th-century scene

== Art and literature ==
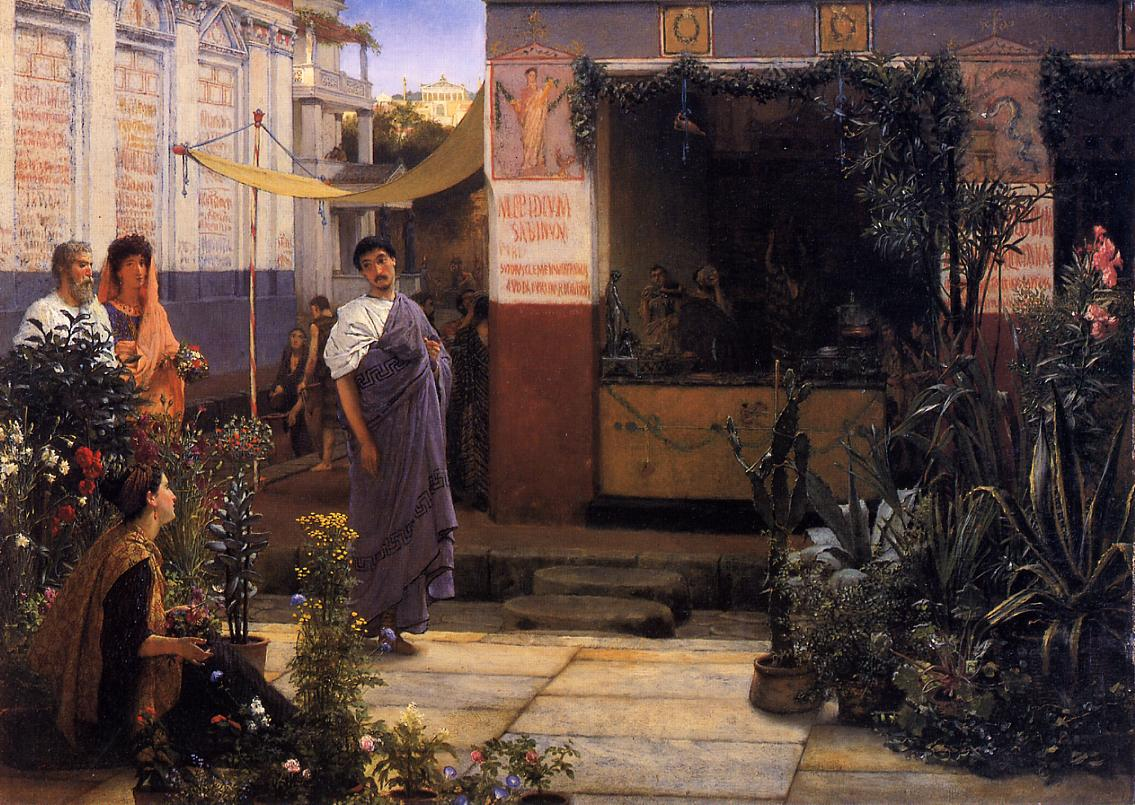
A Roman Flower Market by Lawrence Alma-Tadema (1868). Flower market in Roman times, with a cactus and two agaves. Cacti and agaves are originally American plants.

Lorenzo Lotto. (c. 1480 – 1556/57) Birth of Jesus with a crucifix on the wall.

Anachronism is used especially in works of imagination that rest on a historical basis. Anachronisms may be introduced in many ways: for example, in the disregard of the different modes of life and thought that characterize different periods, or in ignorance of the progress of the arts and sciences and other facts of history. They vary from glaring inconsistencies to scarcely perceptible misrepresentation. Anachronisms may be the unintentional result of ignorance, or may be a deliberate aesthetic choice.

Sir Walter Scott justified the use of anachronism in historical literature: "It is necessary, for exciting interest of any kind, that the subject assumed should be, as it were, translated into the manners as well as the language of the age we live in." However, as fashions, conventions and technologies move on, such attempts to use anachronisms to engage an audience may have quite the reverse effect, as the details in question are increasingly recognized as belonging neither to the historical era being represented, nor to the present, but to the intervening period in which the artwork was created. "Nothing becomes obsolete like a period vision of an older period", writes Anthony Grafton; "Hearing a mother in a historical movie of the 1940s call out 'Ludwig! Ludwig van Beethoven! Come in and practice your piano now!' we are jerked from our suspension of disbelief by what was intended as a means of reinforcing it, and plunged directly into the American bourgeois world of the filmmaker."

It is only since the beginning of the 19th century that anachronistic deviations from historical reality have jarred on a general audience. C. S. Lewis wrote:

All medieval narratives about the past are ... lacking in a sense of period.... It was known that Adam went naked till he fell. After that, [medieval people] pictured the whole past in terms of their own age. So indeed did the Elizabethans. So did Milton; he never doubted that "capon and white broth" would have been as familiar to Christ and the disciples as to himself. It is doubtful whether the sense of period is much older than the Waverley novels. It is hardly present in Gibbon. Walpole's Otranto, which would not now deceive schoolchildren, could hope, not quite vainly, to deceive the public of 1765. Where even the most obvious and superficial distinctions between one century (or millennium) and another were ignored, the profounder differences of temper and mental climate were naturally not dreamed of.... [In Chaucer's Troilus and Criseyde], [t]he manners, the fighting, the religious services, the very traffic-regulations of his Trojans, are fourteenth-century.

Anachronisms abound in the works of Raphael and Shakespeare, as well as in those of less celebrated painters and playwrights of earlier times. Carol Meyers says that anachronisms in ancient texts can be used to better understand the stories by asking what the anachronism represents. Repeated anachronisms and historical errors can become an accepted part of popular culture, such as the belief that Roman legionaries wore leather armor.

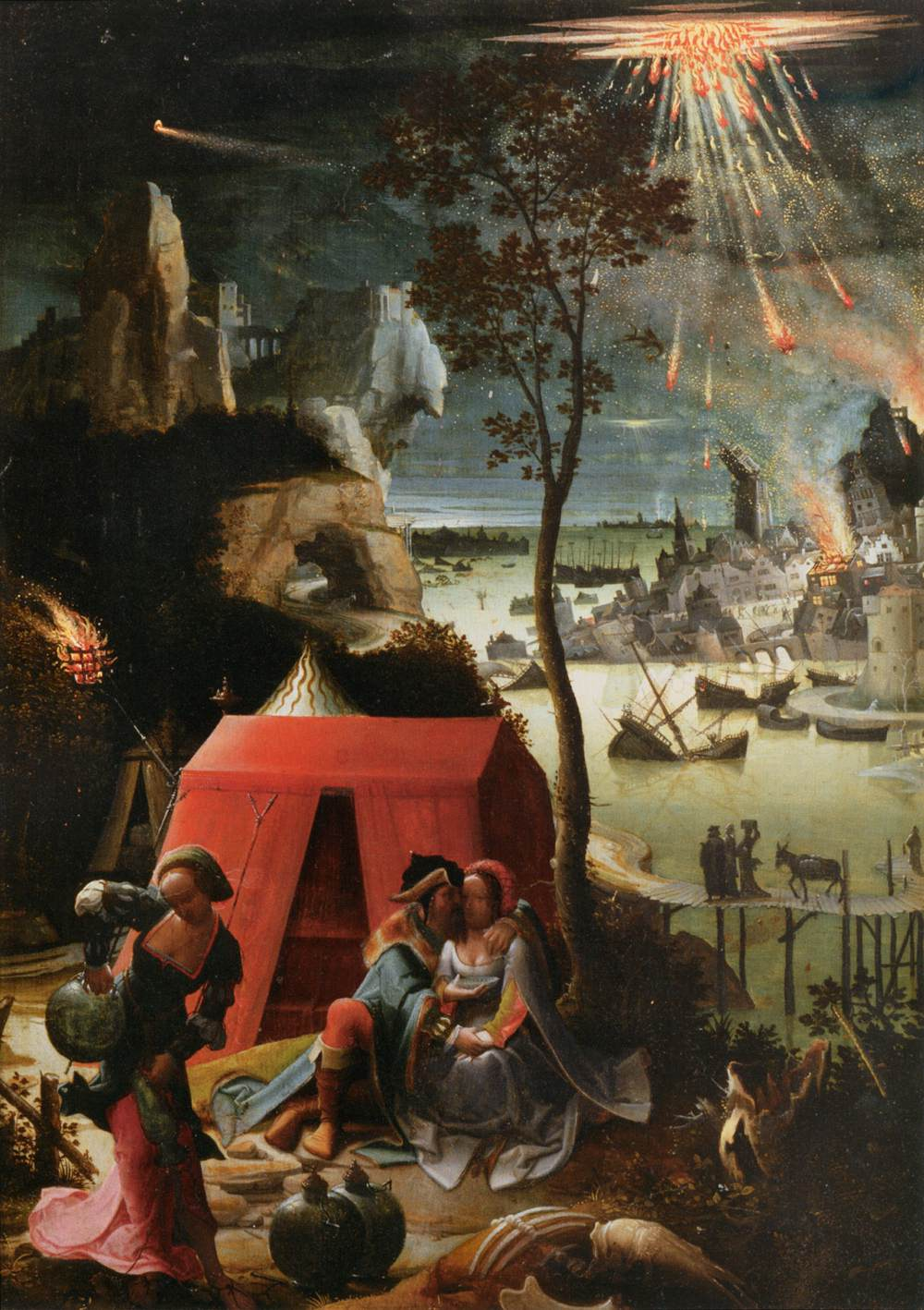
Lot and His Daughters, a painting of c.1520, shows Biblical Sodom as a typical Dutch city of the painter's time.

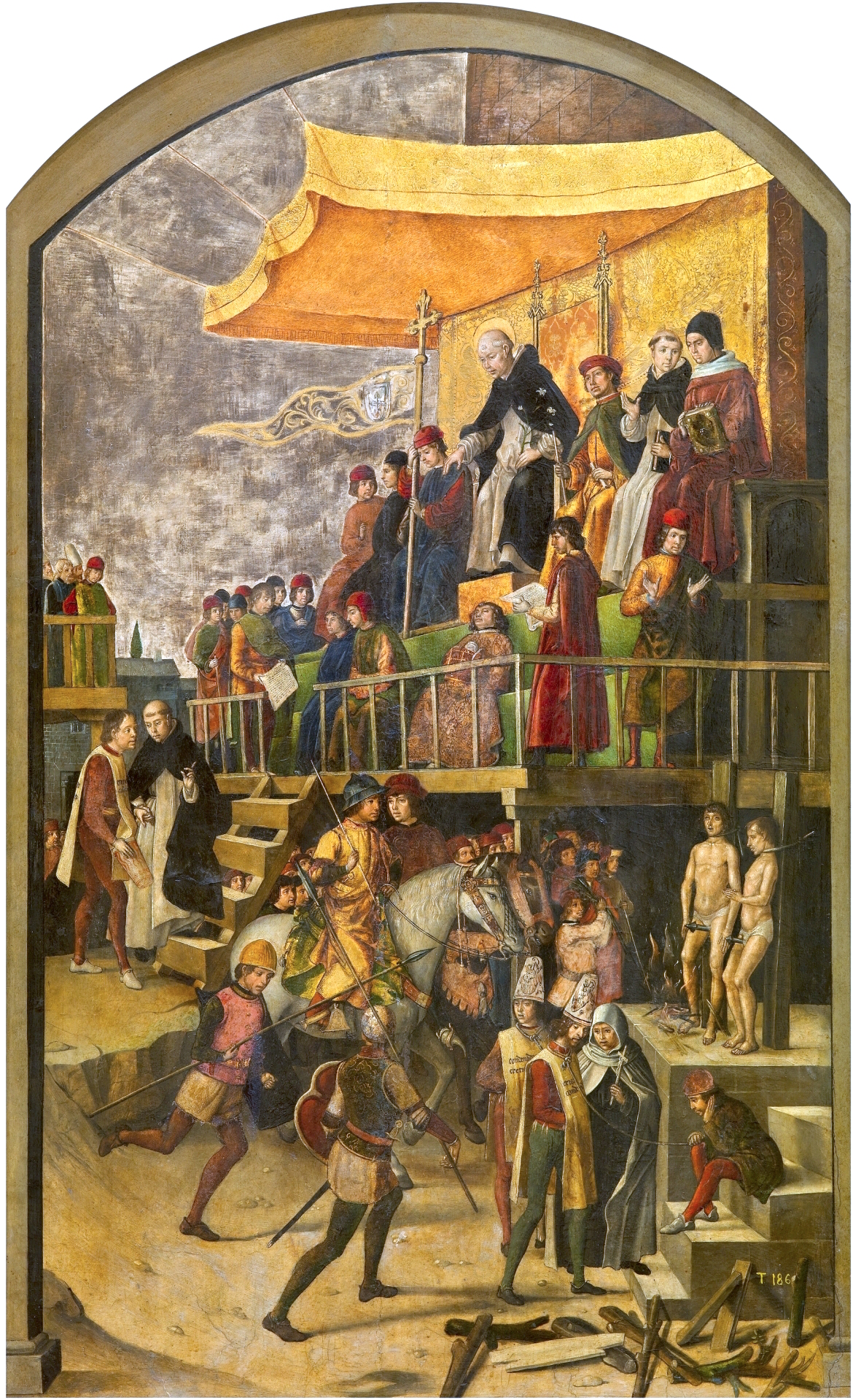
St Dominic, active in the 13th century, shown presiding over an auto-da-fé ceremony of a kind only instituted more than two hundred years after his death

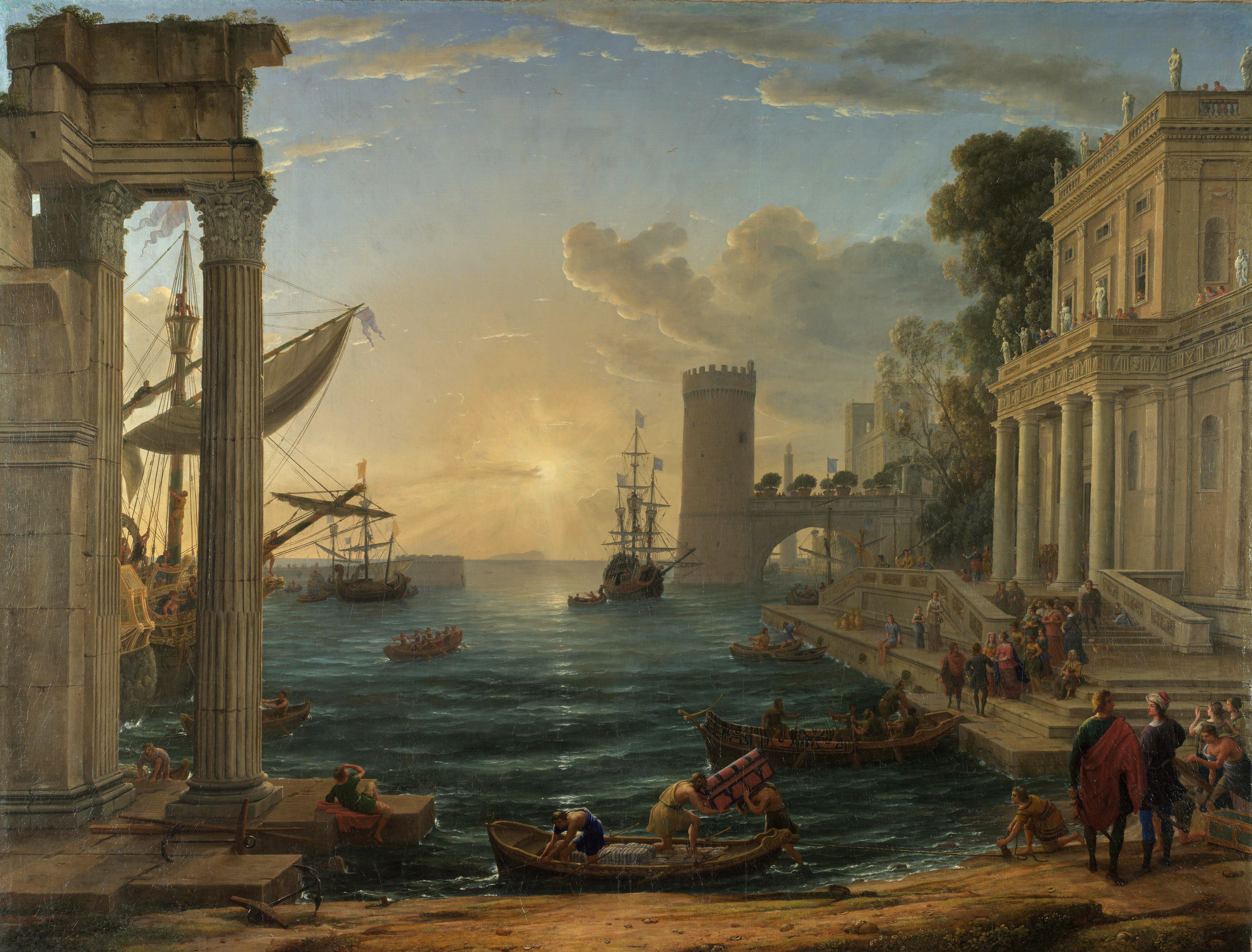
The Embarkation of the Queen of Sheba, a 1648 painting by Claude Lorrain showing the departure of the Queen of Sheba on 17th-century sailing ships, with Renaissance-style buildings.

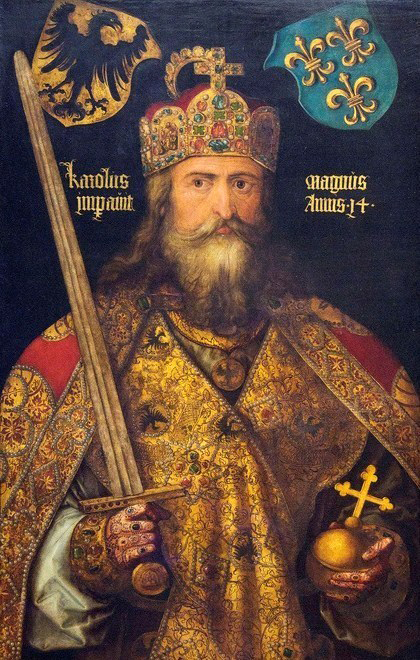
Charlemagne wearing the Imperial Crown of the Holy Roman Empire, by Albrecht Dürer, c. 1512. The crown was made a century and a half after Charlemagne's death.

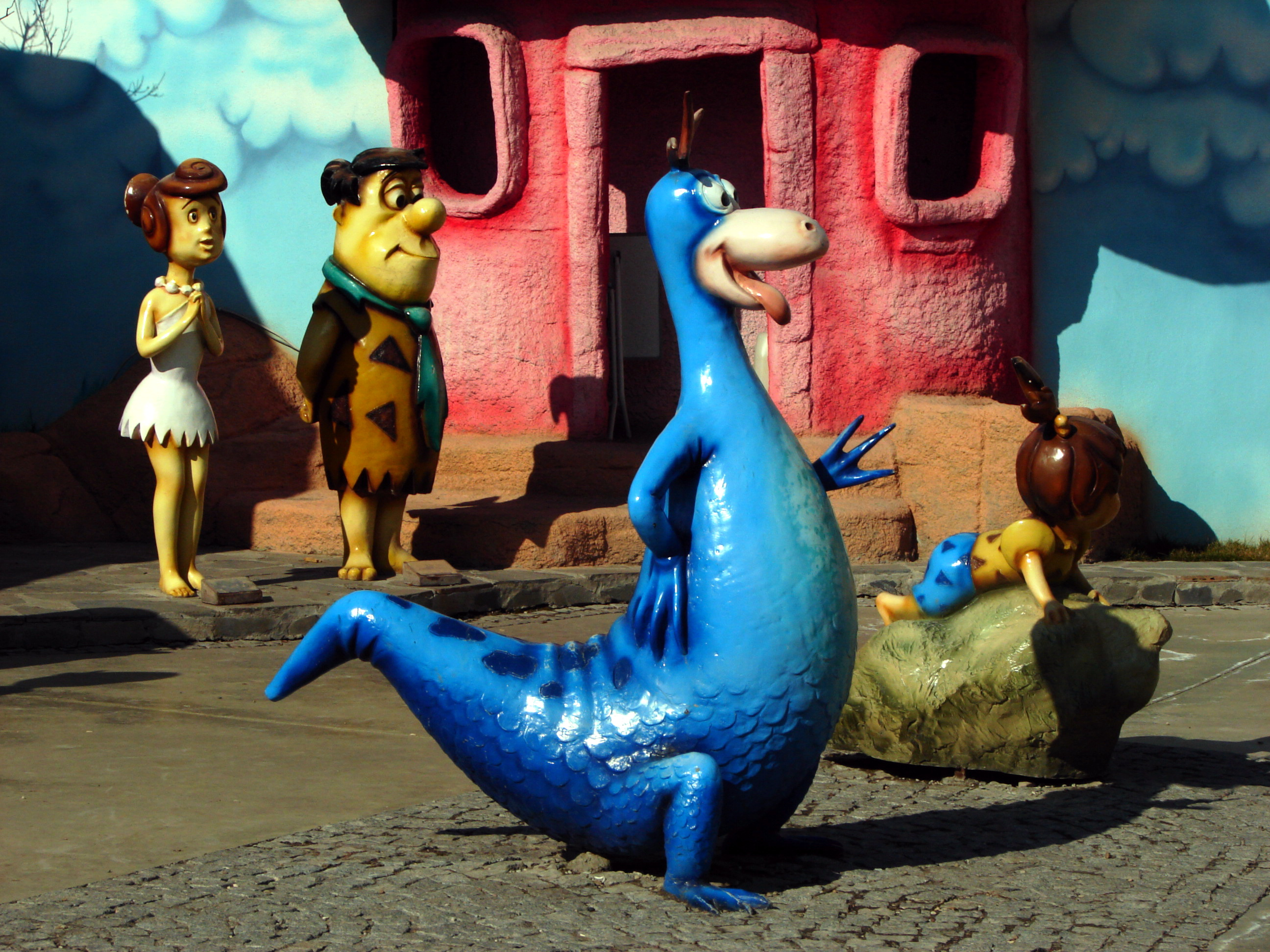
Non-avian dinosaurs co-existing with hominids, as in The Flintstones, is a relatively common anachronistic depiction in comics and animated cartoons.

=== Comical anachronism ===
Comedy fiction set in the past may use anachronism for humorous effect. Comedic anachronism can be used to make serious points about both historical and modern society, such as drawing parallels to political or social conventions.

=== Future anachronism ===
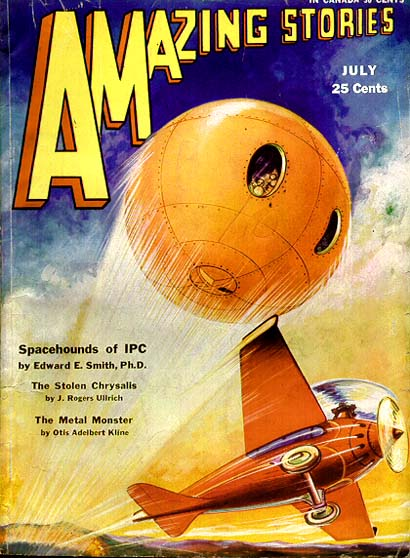
A 1931 Amazing Stories cover has future space technology advanced enough for a large-scale colonization of Mars alongside propeller airplanes.

Even with careful research, science fiction writers risk anachronism as their works age because they cannot predict all political, social, and technological change.

For example, many books, television shows, radio productions and films nominally set in the mid-21st century or later refer to the Soviet Union, to Saint Petersburg in Russia as Leningrad, to the continuing struggle between the Eastern and Western Blocs and to divided Germany and divided Berlin. Star Trek has suffered from future anachronisms; instead of "retconning" these errors, the 2009 film retained them for consistency with older franchises.

Buildings or natural features, such as the World Trade Center in New York City, can become out of place once they disappear, with some works having been edited to remove the World Trade Center to avoid this situation.

Futuristic technology may appear alongside technology which would be obsolete by the time in which the story is set. For example, in the stories of Robert A. Heinlein, interplanetary space travel coexists with calculation using slide rules.

=== Language anachronism ===
Language anachronisms in novels and films are quite common, both intentional and unintentional. Intentional anachronisms inform the audience more readily about a film set in the past. In this regard, language and pronunciation change so fast that most modern people (even many scholars) would find it difficult, or even impossible, to understand a film with dialogue in 15th-century English; thus, audiences willingly accept characters speaking an updated language, and modern slang and figures of speech are often used in these films.

== Unconscious anachronism ==
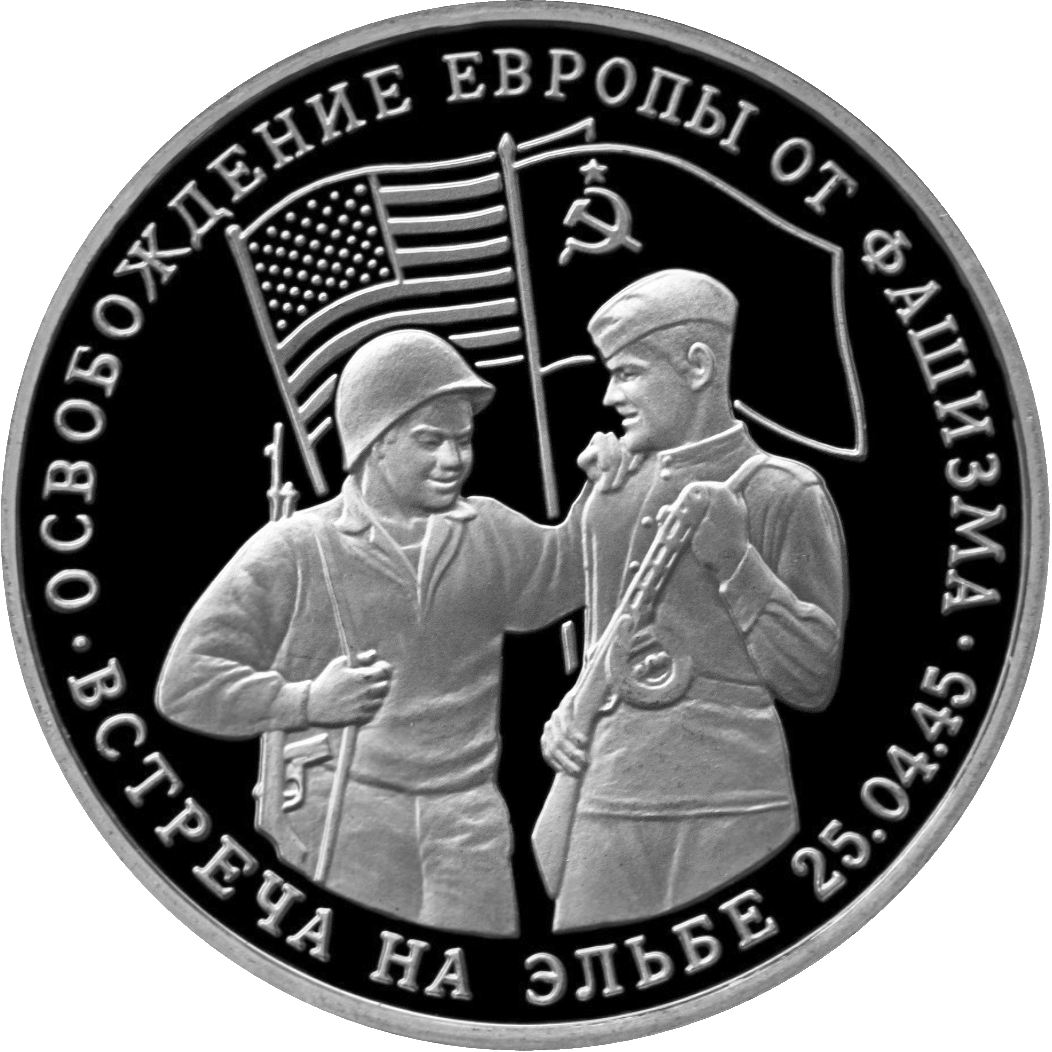
A Russian commemorative coin of 1995 depicting Soviet and American troops meeting at Torgau in 1945. It shows the 50-star U.S. flag, first used in 1960, instead of the 48-star flag used at the time.

Unintentional anachronisms may occur even in what are intended as wholly objective and accurate records or representations of historic artifacts and artworks, because the perspectives of historical recorders are conditioned by the assumptions and practices of their own times, in a form of cultural bias. One example is the attribution of historically inaccurate beards to various medieval tomb effigies and figures in stained glass in records made by English antiquaries of the late 16th and early 17th centuries. Working in an age in which beards were in fashion and widespread, the antiquaries seem to have unconsciously projected the fashion back into an era in which they were rare.

== In academia ==
In historical writing, the most common type of anachronism is the adoption of the political, social or cultural concerns and assumptions of one era to interpret or evaluate the events and actions of another. The anachronistic application of present-day perspectives to comment on the historical past is sometimes described as presentism. Empiricist historians, working in the traditions established by Leopold von Ranke in the 19th century, regard this as a great error, and a trap to be avoided. Arthur Marwick has argued that "a grasp of the fact that past societies are very different from our own, and ... very difficult to get to know" is an essential and fundamental skill of the professional historian; and that "anachronism is still one of the most obvious faults when the unqualified (those expert in other disciplines, perhaps) attempt to do history".

== Detection of forgery ==
The ability to identify anachronisms may be employed as a critical and forensic tool to demonstrate the fraudulence of a document or artifact purporting to be from an earlier time. Anthony Grafton discusses, for example, the work of the 3rd-century philosopher Porphyry, of Isaac Casaubon (1559–1614), and of Richard Reitzenstein (1861–1931), all of whom succeeded in exposing literary forgeries and plagiarisms, such as those included in the "Hermetic Corpus", through – among other techniques – the recognition of anachronisms. The detection of anachronisms is an important element within the scholarly discipline of diplomatics, the critical analysis of the forms and language of documents, developed by the Maurist scholar Jean Mabillon (1632–1707) and his successors René-Prosper Tassin (1697–1777) and Charles-François Toustain (1700–1754). The philosopher and reformer Jeremy Bentham wrote at the beginning of the 19th century:

The falsehood of a writing will often be detected, by its making direct mention of, or allusions more or less indirect to, some fact posterior to the date which it bears. ... The mention of posterior facts; – first indication of forgery.
In a living language there are always variations in words, in the meaning of words, in the construction of phrases, in the manner of spelling, which may detect the age of a writing, and lead to legitimate suspicions of forgery. ... The use of words not used till after the date of the writing; – second indication of forgery.

Examples are:

- The exposure by Lorenzo Valla in 1440 of the so-called Donation of Constantine, a decree purportedly issued by the Emperor Constantine the Great in either 315 or 317 AD, as a later forgery, depended to a considerable degree on the identification of anachronisms, such as references to the city of Constantinople (a name not in fact bestowed until 330 AD).
- A large number of anachronisms in the Book of Mormon have convinced critics that the book was written in the 19th century, and not, as its adherents claim, in pre-Columbian America.
- The use of 19th- and 20th-century antisemitic terminology demonstrates that the purported "Franklin Prophecy" (attributed to Benjamin Franklin, who died in 1790) is a forgery.
- The "William Lynch speech", an address, supposedly delivered in 1712, on the control of slaves in Virginia, is now considered to be a 20th-century forgery, partly on account of its use of anachronistic terms such as "program" and "refueling".

== See also ==
- Anachronism of nationalist motifs (1812 Overture) – 1880 concert overture by Pyotr Ilyich Tchaikovsky
- Anachronisms in the Book of Mormon – Overview of Book of Mormon anachronisms
- Anatopism – Something out of its proper place
- Evolutionary anachronism – Attributes of living species that arose due to coevolution with other now-extinct species
- Invented tradition – Recently invented cultural practices perceived as old
- List of stories set in a future now in the past
- Precursorism – Historiographical bias based in anachronism
- Retrofuturism – Creative arts movement inspired by historic depictions of the future
- Skeuomorph – Design element borrowed from original medium
- Society for Creative Anachronism – International living history group
- Steampunk – Subgenre of science fiction
- Tiffany Problem – Problem in historical fiction
- Whig history – Approach to historiography

== Bibliography ==
- Grafton, Anthony (1990). Forgers and Critics: creativity and duplicity in Western scholarship. Princeton: Princeton University Press. ISBN 0691055440.
