= Papal diplomatics =

Scholarly and critical study of documents of the Papacy

Papal diplomatics is the scholarly and critical study (diplomatics) of the authentic documents of the papacy, largely to distinguish them from spurious documents. The study emerges in the Middle Ages and has been further refined in the centuries since.

== History ==
The authenticity of papal bulls, alongside royal charters and other legal instruments, became a matter of concern in the Middle Ages. The Papal Chancery oversaw control of documents and precautions taken against forgery. Pope Gregory VII refrained even from attaching the usual leaden seal to a bull for fear it should fall into unscrupulous hands and be used for fraudulent purposes, while Pope Innocent III issued instructions with a view to the detection of forgeries. An ecclesiastic of the standing of Lanfranc has been seriously accused of conniving at the fabrication of bulls, and so the need of some system of tests became obvious.

But the medieval criticism of documents was not very satisfactory even in the hands of a jurist like Pope Alexander III. Though Laurentius Valla, the humanist, was right in denouncing the Donation of Constantine, and though the Magdeburg Centuriator, Matthias Flacius, was right in attacking the Pseudo-Isidorian Decretals, their methods, in themselves, were often crude and inconclusive. The modern discipline of diplomatics really dates only from the time of the Benedictine Jean Mabillon (1632–1707), whose fundamental work, De Re Diplomatica (Paris, 1681), was written to correct the principles advocated in the criticism of ancient documents by the Bollandist, Daniel Papebroch.

Scholars including Barthélemy Germon (1663–1718) and Jean Hardouin in France, and, to a lesser degree, George Hickes in England, rejected Mabillon's criteria; but all that has been done since Mabillon's time has been to develop his methods and occasionally to modify his judgements upon some point of detail. After the issue of a Supplement in 1704, a second, enlarged and improved edition of the De Re Diplomatica was prepared by Mabillon himself and published in 1709, after his death, by his pupil Thierry Ruinart. This pioneer work had not extended to any documents later than the thirteenth century and had taken no account of certain classes of papers, such as the ordinary letters of the popes and privileges of a more private character. Two other Maurists, Charles-François Toustain and René-Prosper Tassin, compiled a work in six large quarto volumes, with many facsimiles etc., known as the Nouveau Traité de Diplomatique (Paris, 1750–1765). It was a small advance on Mabillon's own treatise, but was widely used; and was presented in a more summary form by François Jean de Vaines, and others.

With the exception of some useful works directed at particular countries, as also the treatise of Luigi Gaetano Marini on papyrus documents, no great advance was made in the science for a century and a half after Mabillon's death. The Dictionnaire raisonné de diplomatique chrétienne by Maximilien Quantin, which forms part of Migne's Encyclopedia, is a digest of older works; and the sumptuous Eléments de paléographie of de Wailly (2 vols, 1838) has little independent merit.

In the second half of the 19th century the field was active, with the names of Léopold Delisle, the chief librarian of the Bibliothèque Nationale, Paris, M. de Mas-Latrie, professor at the Ecole des Chartes, and Julius von Pflugk-Harttung, the editor of a series of facsimiles of papal bulls. A calendar of early papal bulls began appearing from 1902, the results of researches of P. Kehr, A. Brackmann, and W. Wiederhold, in Nachrichten der Göttingen Gesellsehaft der Wissenschaften. Papal regesta were published, especially by members of the Ecole Française de Rome.

== Subject matter ==
Officials concerned with the preparation of the documents collectively formed the Chancery. The constitution of the Chancery, which in the case of the Holy See seems to date back to a schola notariorum, with a primicerius at its head, first recorded during the tenure of Pope Julius I (337–352), varied from period to period, and the part played by the different officials composing it necessarily varied also. Besides the Holy See, each bishop also had some sort of chancery for the issue of his own episcopal acts.

The procedure of the Chancery is only a study preparatory to the examination of the text of the document itself. As the position of the Holy See became more fully recognized, the business of the Chancery increased, and there arose a marked tendency to adhere strictly to the forms prescribed by traditional usage. Various collections of these formulae, of which the Liber Diurnus is one of the most ancient, were compiled at an early date. Many others will be found in the Recueil général des formules of Eugène de Rozière (Paris, 1861–1871), though these, like the series published by Zeumer, are mainly secular in character.

After the text of the document, which of course varies according to its nature, and in which not merely the wording but also the rhythm (the so-called cursus) has often to be considered, attention must be paid:

- to the manner of dating
- to the signatures
- to the attestations of witnesses etc.
- to the seals and the attachment of the seals (sigillography)
- to the material upon which it is written and to the manner of folding
- to the handwriting (including the science of palaeography).

All these matters fall within the scope of diplomatics, and all offer different tests for the authenticity of any given document. There are other details which often need to be considered, for example the Tironian notes (or shorthand), which are of not infrequent occurrence in primitive Urkunden, both papal and imperial. A special section in any comprehensive study of diplomatics is also likely to be devoted to spurious documents: the number is surprisingly great.

== See also ==
- Rota (papal signature)
