= Jean Saas =

French historian and bibliographer (1703–1774)

- Born: 4 February 1703; Saint-Pierre-de-Franqueville, France
- Died: 20 April 1774 (aged 71)
- Occupation: historian

Jean Saas (4 February 1703 – 20 April 1774) was an 18th-century French historian and bibliographer.

== Biography ==
At college of Rouen where he studied, Saas distinguished himself by his talent for Latin poetry. Having embraced the ecclesiastical state, he became one of the secretaries of the archbishop of Rouen and took advantage of the leisure left to him by this modest employment to become familiar with reading charts and study in depth the History of Normandy.

Provided the cure of Saint-Jacques-sur-Darnétal, he soon resigned this benefit and accepted instead a position of librarian of the metropolitan chapter, which would facilitate the means to indulge his taste for historical and literary research. In the trial the chapter had to support against the Benedictines of the abbaye de Saint-Ouen, father Saas showed great zeal for the maintenance of the privileges of his church, and he was rewarded in 1751 by a canonry.

Saas was known for a long time in an advantageous manner as a bibliographer. The assiduous reading of historical dictionaries proved him that those who were most esteemed were not error-free, and he was quick to point out, in small scholarly writings, those he had noticed. He was going to press a volume of notes forming a useful supplement to the latest edition of the Dictionaire of Moréri, when the sudden weakening of his forces forced him to give up all kind of work. He died suddenly after lingering a few years.

Abbot Saas was a member of the Académie des sciences, belles-lettres et arts de Rouen since its founding, and he had shared the work with zeal, but the fate of the memoirs he had shared with this company is unknown. Haillet de Couronne read his Éloge of which an extract can be found in the Recueil de l’académie by M. Gosseaume, vol.4, (p. 286). Another praise of abbot Saas, by Cotton Deshoussayes, was printed in Paris, Berton, 1776, in-8° (35 pages).

== Publications ==
- Fables choisies by la Fontaine, translated into Latin verse bys PP. Vinot and Tissard, Anvers (Rouen), 1738, in-12 de 288 p. (This volume includes several pieces such as the Combat des rats et des grenouilles, by Calenzio; Solitude, by Saint-Amant; l’Horloge de sable, by Gilles de Caux, with translations in Latin.)
- Nouveau Dictionnaire historique portatif, corrected and augmented with several articles, Avignon (Rouen), 1769, 4 vol. in-8°.
- Nouveau pouillé des bénéfices du diocèse de Rouen, ibid., 1738, in-4°;
- Lettres à l’auteur du Supplément au Dictionnaire de Moréri, (abbé Goujet), (1742), in-12 de 117 pages.(Goujet frankly admitted his mistakes, and far from being angry against his critic, they became friends despite their difference of opinion, because Saas was devoted to the Jesuits.)
- Notice des manuscrits de la bibliothèque de l’église métropolitaine de Rouen, ibid., 1746, in-12 de rom XXIII, 116 pages. (The preface contains the history of the library dispersed during wars and renewed in 1636 by canon Acarie, whose example was followed by many of his colleagues. Dom Tassin strongly criticized the booklet of father Saas, who replied with a pamphlet entitled Réfutation de l’écrit du P. Tassin, etc., 1747, in-12 de 49 pages.
- Lettre sur le troisième volume du Dictionnaire de Chaufepiè, dans les Mémoires de Trévoux, 1754, p. 2918-2940;
- Elogia in obitum D. de Fontenelle, lecta, etc., Rouen, 1757, in-8°;
- Lettres d’un professeur de Douai à un professeur de Louvain sur le Dictionnaire historique portatif de l’abbé Ladvocat et sur l’Encyclopédie, Douai (Rouen), 1762, in-8° de 119 pages; (Saas also points out several mistakes by Moréri in 1759.)
- Lettres (au nombre de sept) sur l’Encyclopédie pour servir de supplément aux sept volumes de ce dictionnaire, Amsterdam (Rouen), 1764, in-8°; he only reports errors in geography, history and chronology.
- Lettre à l’abbé Goujet, contenant de nouvelles remarques sur lsotta, femme savante d’Italie, dans le tome 5 des Mémoires d’Artigny. (It is believed that Saas lent his hand to the two letters by Pierre-Nicolas Midy, of the Académie de Rouen, to Charles-Joseph Panckoucke, printer of the Grand Vocabulaire français, Amsterdam (Rouen), 1767, in-8°.)

Saas had Hippolytus redivivus reprinted; he provided notes to Fontette for the Bibliothèque historique de la France; We owe him much of the project Affiches et annonces de la haute et basse Normandie, where he contributed several articles.

Saas started under the name Anti-Moreéri, a much larger work. The manuscript, forming 625 pages in-fol., extended only on the first five letters of the alphabet, mainly on TA. It passed into the hands of Drouet, who intended to make use of for a supplement (Éloge de Saas, by Cotton, p. 30).

== Sources ==
- Louis Gabriel Michaud. "name". Biographie universelle ancienne et moderne : histoire par ordre alphabétique de la vie publique et privée de tous les hommes avec la collaboration de plus de 300 savants et littérateurs français ou étrangers (in French) (2 ed.).vol. 37, (p. 165)
