= Eliseo Calenzio =

Italian poet (1430–1503)

Eliseo Calenzio, Latin Calentius, (1430, Apulia – 1503) was a 15th-century Italian Neo-Latin humanist and poet.

He was tutor of Frederick of Naples, son of Ferdinand II of Naples, and friend of Jacopo Sannazaro.

His Works were published in Rome in 1503. They include the Combat des rats contre les grenouilles, imitated from Homer, and reprinted in 1738 in Rouen in an edition of the Fables choisies by Jean de La Fontaine set in Latin verse, published by abbot Jean Saas.

== Epistolae ad Hiaracum ==
- Eliseo Calenzio on data.bnf.fr
