= Saint-Pierremont, Ardennes =

Saint-Pierremont
- Commune
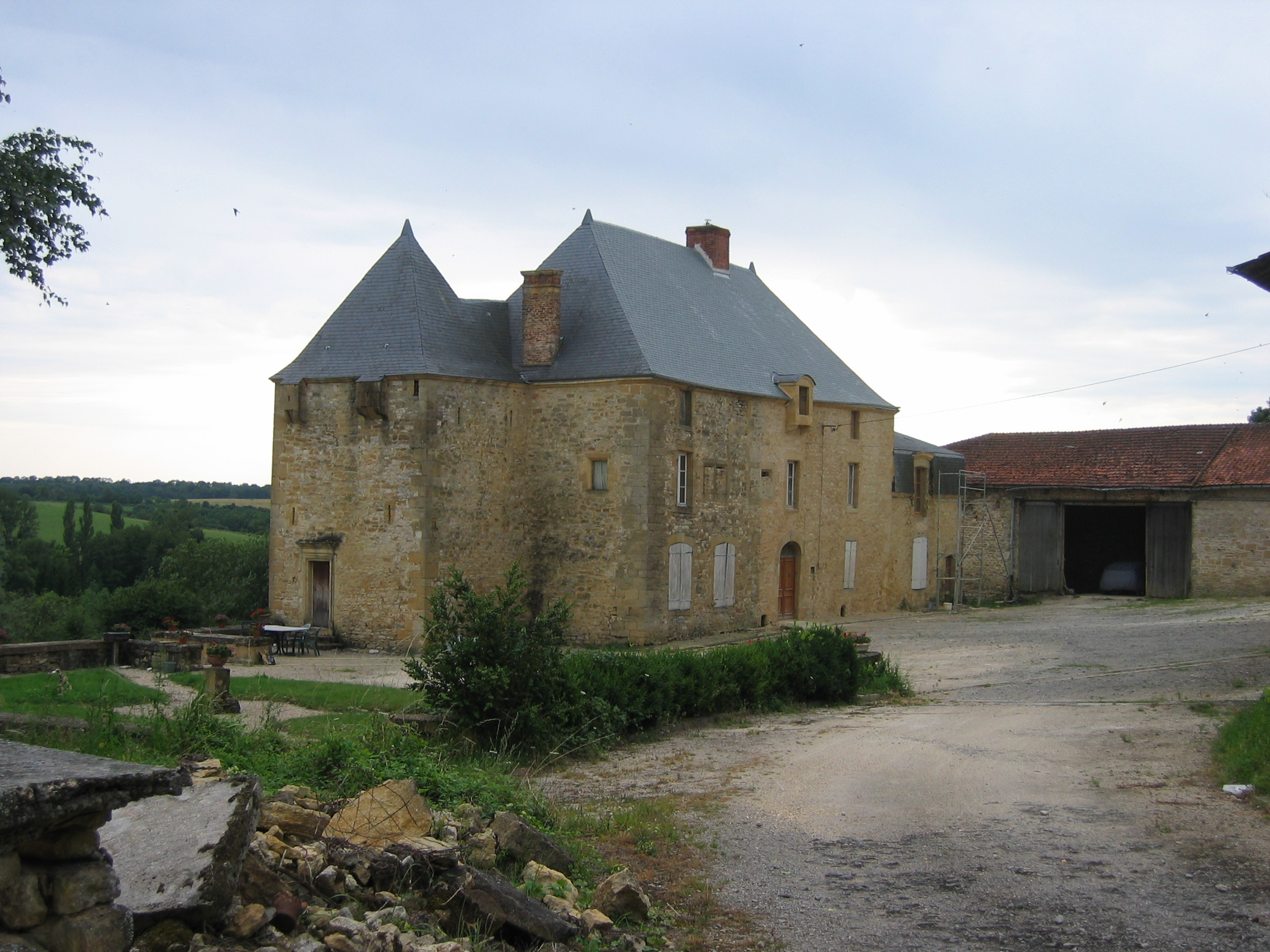
- Chateau

- Coat of arms
- Location of Saint-Pierremont
- Location within France Location within Grand Est
- Coordinates: 49°29′13″N 4°56′18″E
- Country: France
- Region: Grand Est
- Department: Ardennes
- Arrondissement: Vouziers
- Canton: Vouziers
- Intercommunality: Argonne Ardennaise

Government
  - Mayor (2020–2026): Loïc Lalonde
- Area^{1}: 19.77 km^{2} (7.63 sq mi)
- Elevation: 230 m (750 ft)
- Highest elevation: 294 m (965 ft)
- Lowest elevation: 178 m (584 ft)
- Population (2023): 70
  - Density: 3.5/km^{2} (9.2/sq mi)
- Time zone: UTC+01:00 (CET)
  - Summer (DST): UTC+02:00 (CEST)
- INSEE/Postal code: 08394 /08240
- ^{1} French Land Register data, which excludes lakes, ponds, glaciers > 1 km^{2} (0.386 sq mi or 247 acres) and river estuaries.

Saint-Pierremont (French pronunciation: [sɛ̃ pjɛʁmɔ̃]) is a commune in the Ardennes department in northern France.

== Population ==
Historical population
Year	Pop.	±% p.a.
1968	148	—
1975	114	−3.66%
1982	114	+0.00%
1990	100	−1.62%
1999	112	+1.27%
2007	97	−1.78%
2012	79	−4.02%
2017	73	−1.57%
2023	70	−0.70%
Source: INSEE

== See also ==
- Communes of the Ardennes department
