= Diplomatics =

Academic study of the protocols of documents

Diplomatics (in American English, and in most anglophone countries), or diplomatic (in British English), is a scholarly discipline centred on the critical analysis of documents, especially historical documents. It focuses on the conventions, protocols and formulae that have been used by document creators, and uses these to increase understanding of the processes of document creation, of information transmission, and of the relationships between the facts which the documents purport to record and reality.

The discipline originally evolved as a tool for studying and determining the authenticity of the official charters and diplomas issued by royal and papal chanceries. It was subsequently appreciated that many of the same underlying principles could be applied to other types of official document and legal instrument, to non-official documents such as private letters, and, most recently, to the metadata of electronic records.

Diplomatics is one of the auxiliary sciences of history. It should not be confused with its sister-discipline of palaeography. In fact, its techniques have more in common with those of the literary disciplines of textual criticism and historical criticism.

== Etymology ==
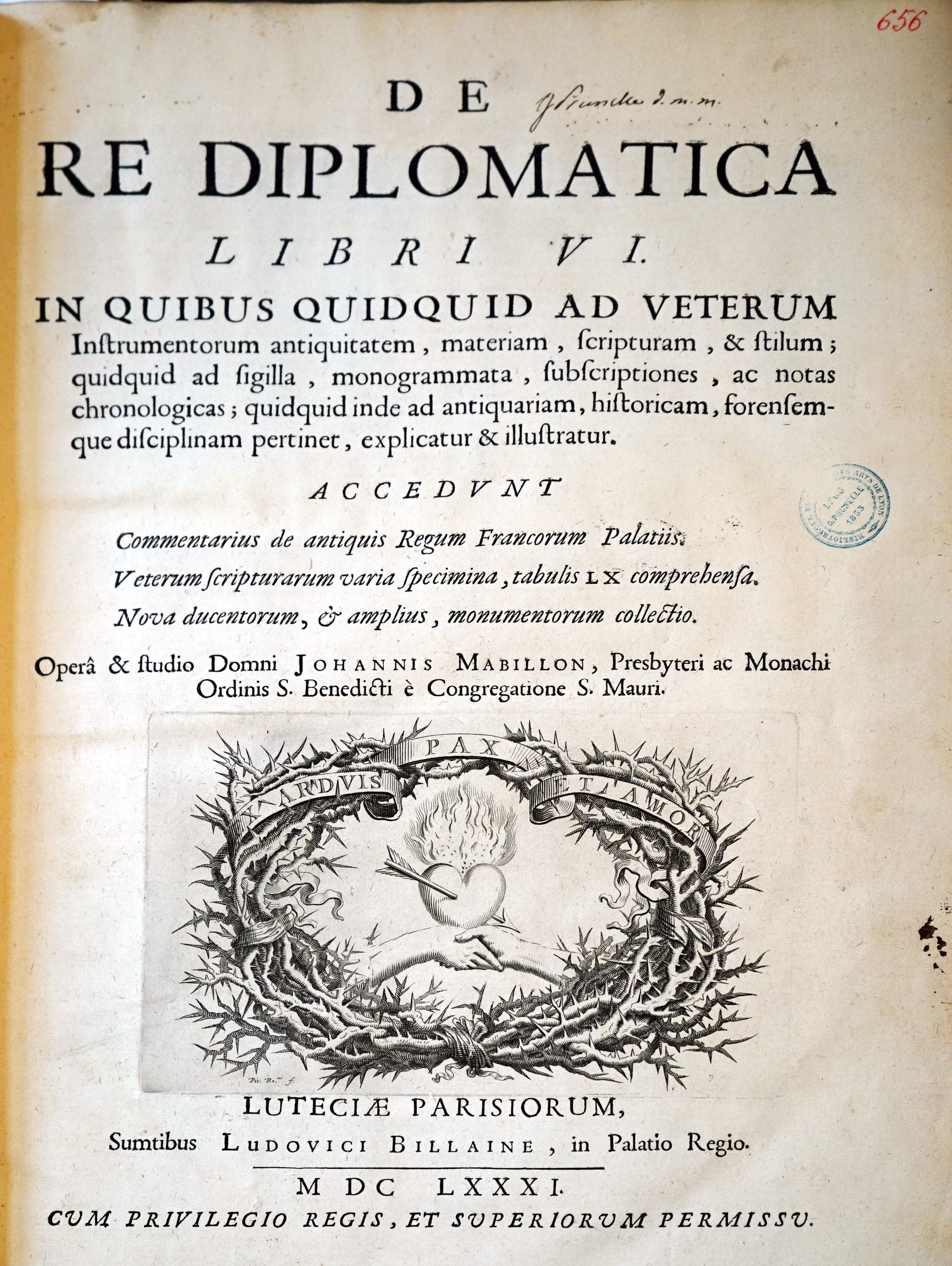
Title page of Jean Mabillon's De re diplomatica (1681)

Despite the verbal similarity, the discipline has nothing to do with diplomacy. Both terms are derived, by separate linguistic development, from the word diploma, which originally referred to a folded piece of writing material—and thus both to the materials which are the focus of study in diplomatics, and to accreditation papers carried by diplomats.

The word diplomatics was effectively coined by the Benedictine monk Jean Mabillon, who in 1681 published his treatise, De re diplomatica (Latin: roughly, "The Study of Documents"). From there, the word entered the French language as diplomatique, and then English as diplomatic or diplomatics.

== Definitions ==
Webster's Dictionary (1828) defines diplomatics as the "science of diplomas, or of ancient writings, literary and public documents, letters, decrees, charters, codicils, etc., which has for its object to decipher old writings, to ascertain their authenticity, their date, signatures, etc."

Giorgio Cencetti (1908–1970) defined the discipline as "the study of the Wesen [being] and Werden [becoming] of documentation, the analysis of genesis, inner constitution and transmission of documents, and of their relationship with the facts represented in them and with their creators".

The Commission International de Diplomatique has defined diplomatics as "the science which studies the tradition, the form and the issuing of written documents".

More pragmatically, Peter Beal defines diplomatics as "the science or study of documents and records, including their forms, language, script and meaning. It involves knowledge of such matters as the established wording and procedures of particular kinds of document, the deciphering of writing, and document analysis and authentication".

Theo Kölzer defines diplomatics as "the teaching and the study of charters". He treats the terms "charter", "diploma", and "document" as broadly synonymous, and refers to the German scholar Harry Bresslau's definition of "documents" as "written declarations recorded in compliance with certain forms alternating according to the difference in person, place, time, and matter, which are meant to serve as a testimony of proceedings of a legal nature".

Properly speaking, and as usually understood by present-day scholars, diplomatics is concerned essentially with the analysis and interpretation of the linguistic and textual elements of a document. It is, however, closely associated with several parallel disciplines, including palaeography, sigillography, codicology, and provenance studies, all of which are concerned with a document's physical characteristics and history, and which will often be carried out in conjunction with a diplomatic analysis. The term diplomatics is therefore sometimes used in a slightly wider sense, to encompass some of these other areas (as it was in Mabillon's original work, and as is implied in the definitions of both Webster and Beal quoted above). The recent development of the science in non-English Europe is expanding its scope to a cultural history of documentation including aspects of pragmatic literacy or symbolic communication.

Christopher Brooke, a distinguished teacher of diplomatics, referred to the discipline's reputation in 1970 as that of "a formidable and dismal science ... a kind of game played by a few scholars, most of them medievalists, harmless so long as it does not dominate or obscure historical enquiry; or, perhaps, most commonly of all, an aid to understanding of considerable use to scholars and research students if only they had time to spare from more serious pursuits".

== History ==
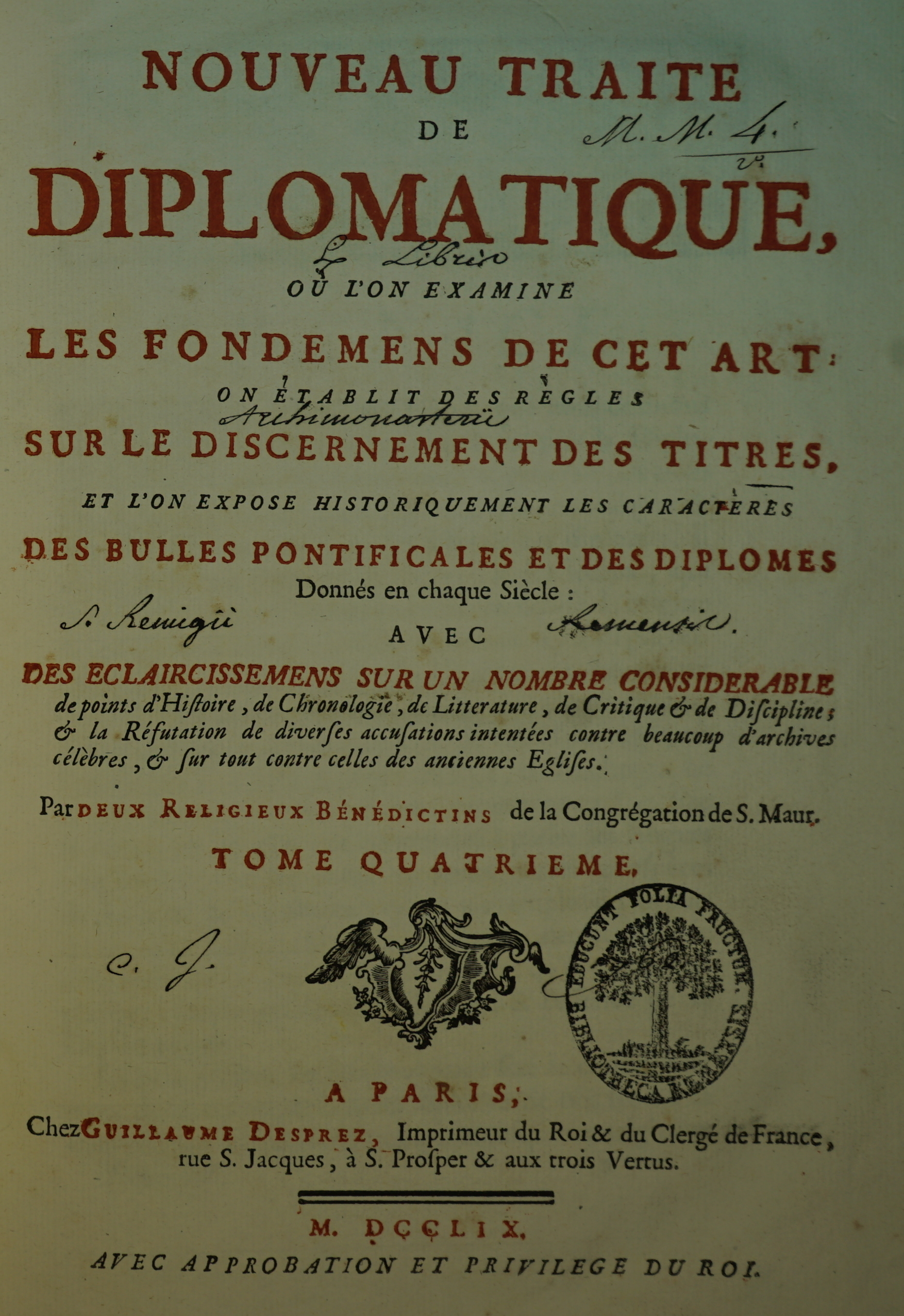
Title page of Volume 4 of Tassin and Toustain's Nouveau traité de diplomatique (1759)

In the ancient and medieval periods, the authenticity of a document was considered to derive from the document's place of preservation and storage, in, for example, temples, public offices, and archives. As a result, those with nefarious motives were able to give forged documents a spurious authenticity by depositing them in places of authority. Diplomatics grew from a need to establish new standards of authenticity through the critical analysis of the textual and physical forms of documents.

The first notable application of diplomatics was by Nicolas of Cusa, in 1433, and Lorenzo Valla, in 1440, who determined, independently, that the Donation of Constantine, which had been used for centuries to legitimize papal temporal authority, was a forgery. Diplomatic techniques were further developed as part of a wider battery of antiquarian skills during the Reformation and Counter-Reformation eras. The emergence of diplomatics as a recognisably distinct sub-discipline, however, is generally dated to the publication of Mabillon's De re diplomatica in 1681. Mabillon had begun studying old documents with a view towards establishing their authenticity as a result of the doubts raised by the Jesuit Daniel van Papenbroek over supposed Merovingian documents from the Abbey of Saint-Denis. During the Middle Ages, the production of spurious charters and other documents had been common, either to provide written documentation of existing rights or to bolster the plausibility of claimed rights. Mabillon's work engendered a far livelier awareness of the potential presence of forged or spurious documents, in the fields of both history and law.

Although Mabillon is still widely seen as the "father" of diplomatics, a more important milestone in the formation of the battery of practical techniques which make up the modern discipline was the publication of René-Prosper Tassin and Charles-François Toustain's Nouveau traité de diplomatique, which appeared in six volumes in 1750–65.

The most significant work in English was Thomas Madox's Formulare Anglicanum, published in 1702. In general, however, the discipline was always studied more intensively by continental scholars than by those in Britain.

Diplomatics is often associated with the study of documents of the medieval period. However, scholars such as Luciana Duranti have argued that many of its theories and principles can be adapted and applied to contemporary archival science.

== Uses ==
The study of diplomatics is a valuable tool for historians, enabling them to determine whether alleged historical documents and archives are in fact genuine or forgeries. Its techniques may also be used to help date undated documents.

Diplomatics has many similar applications in the field of law.

Some famous cases in which the principles of diplomatics have been employed have included:

- Lorenzo Valla's proof of the forgery of the Donation of Constantine. Valla's work preceded Mabillon by roughly two centuries, and was the first application of the principles of modern, scientific diplomatics.
- The Hitler diaries hoax (1983).
- The National Archives forgeries (the Martin Allen forgeries, or Himmler forged documents) (2005).

== Diplomatic editions and transcription ==
A diplomatic edition is an edition (in print or online) of an historic manuscript text that seeks to reproduce as accurately as possible in typography all significant features of the manuscript original, including spelling and punctuation, abbreviations, deletions, insertions, and other alterations. Similarly, diplomatic transcription attempts to represent by means of a system of editorial signs all features of a manuscript original. The term semi-diplomatic is used for an edition or transcription that seeks to reproduce only some of these features of the original. A diplomatic edition is thus distinguished from a normalized edition, in which the editor, while not altering the original wording of the text, renders it using normal (modern) orthography.

A diplomatic edition is also to be distinguished both from a facsimile edition, which, in the modern era, normally employs photographic or digital images; and from a type facsimile (such as Abraham Farley's edition of Domesday Book), which seeks to reproduce the appearance of the original through the use of a special typeface or digital font.

== See also ==
- Forensic science
- Papal diplomatics
- Questioned document examination (for document forensics related to criminal activity)
- Sigillography
- Textual scholarship
