= Charles-François Toustain =

French historian

Charles-François Toustain (13 October 1700 – 1 July 1754) was a French historian and a member of the Benedictine Congregation of Saint Maur. He is remembered for his scholarly work carried out with his fellow Maurist, René-Prosper Tassin.

== Life ==
Charles-François Toustain was born into a family of note at Repas in the diocese of Séez on 13 October 1700. On 20 July 1718, he took the vows of the Benedictine order at the abbey of Jumièges. After finishing the philosophical and theological course at the Abbey of Fécamp, he was sent to the monastery of Bonne-Nouvelle at Rouen, to learn Hebrew and Greek. At the same time he studied Italian, English, German, and Dutch, in order to be able to understand the writers in these languages.

He was not ordained priest until 1729, and then only at the express command of his superior. He always said Mass with much trepidation and only after long preparation. In 1730 he entered the Abbey of St-Ouen at Rouen, and went later to the Abbey of St-Germain-des-Pres and the abbey of the Blancs-Manteaux, both in Paris.

His theological opinions inclined to Jansenism.

Toustain died while taking his milk-cure at the abbey of Saint-Denis on 1 July 1754. He had worn out his body by fasting and ascetic practices.

== Scholarship ==
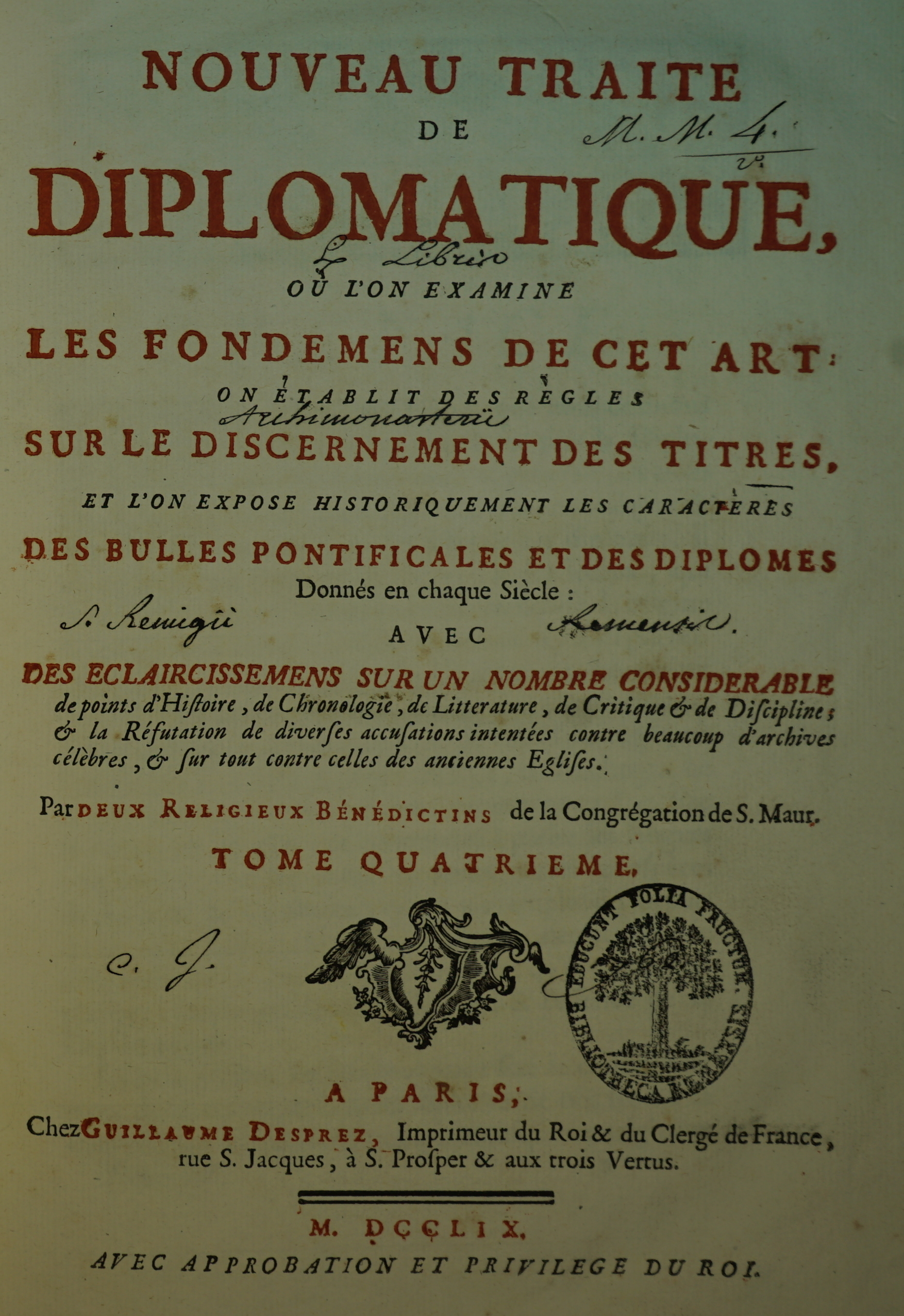
Title page of Volume 4 of Tassin and Toustain's Nouveau traité de diplomatique (1759)

As a scholar Toustain became highly respected. He worked for twenty years with his fellow-Maurist, René-Prosper Tassin, on an edition of the works of the Byzantine Greek monk Theodore the Studite. It was never printed, as a publisher could not be found. Another joint project of the two was the Nouveau traité de diplomatique (6 vols, 1750–1765) in which they addressed more fully and thoroughly the subjects taken up in Jean Mabillon's great work De re diplomatica. Toustain and Tassin's work provided the basis for the modern discipline of diplomatics. The final four volumes were edited by Tassin alone following Toustain's death.

Of general interest among Toustain's personal writings are: La vérité persécutée par l'erreur (2 vols, 1733), a collection of the writings of the Fathers on the persecutions of the first eight centuries; and "L'authorité de miracles dans l'Église" (no date), in which he expounds the opinion of St. Augustine. Tassin testifies that he was zealous in his duties, modest, and sincerely religious.
