= René-Prosper Tassin =

French historian (1697–1777)

- Born: November 17, 1697; Lonlay-l'Abbaye
- Died: September 10, 1777 (aged 79); Paris
- Occupation: Historian

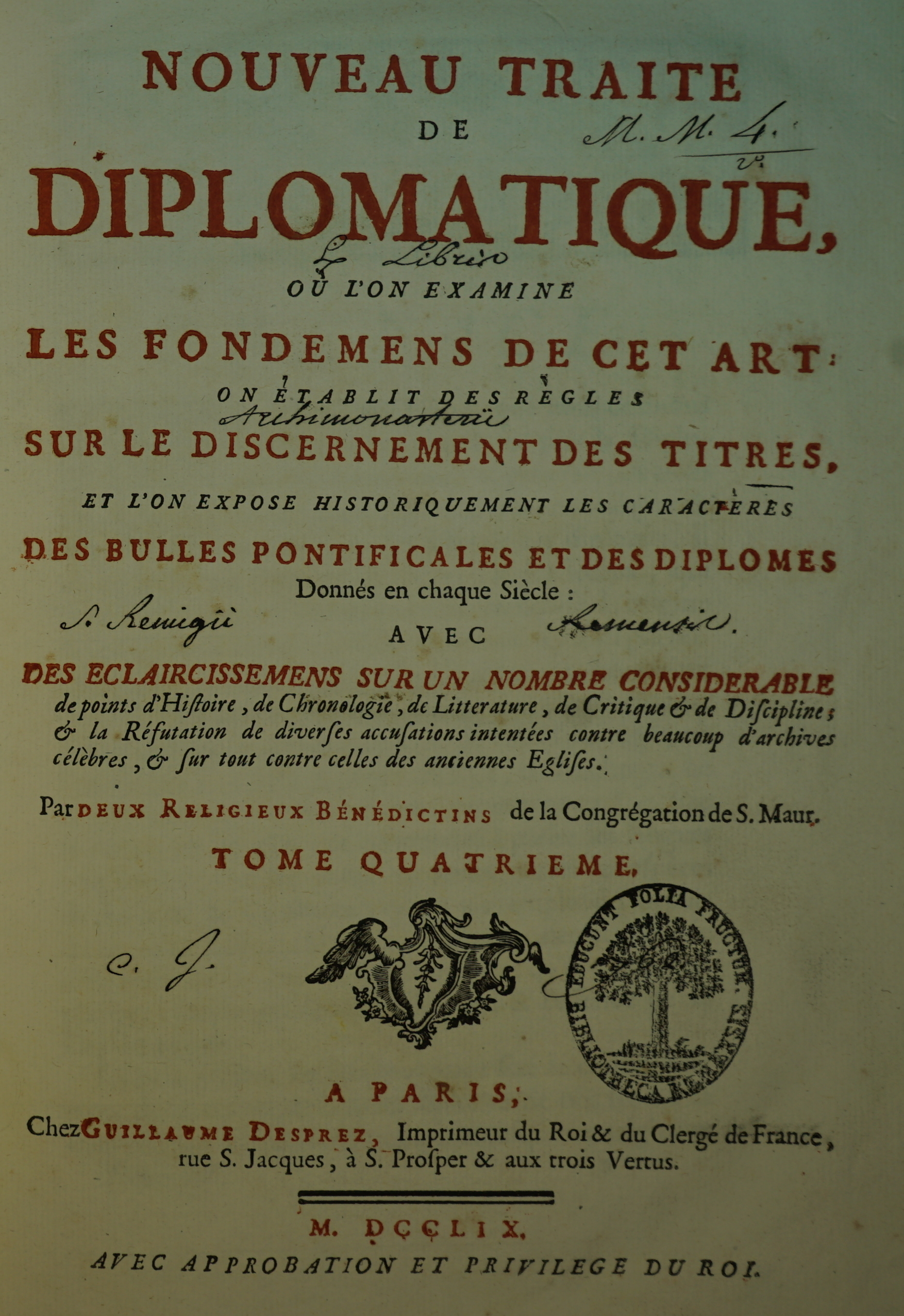
Title page of Volume 4 of Tassin and Toustain's Nouveau traité de diplomatique (1759)

René-Prosper Tassin (17 November 1697 – 10 September 1777) was a French historian, belonging to the Benedictine Congregation of Saint-Maur.

Tassin was born at Lonlay, in the Diocese of Le Mans. He was professed at the Abbey of Jumièges in 1718. United in close friendship with his brother in religion, Charles-François Toustain, he collaborated with him on a new edition of the works of Theodore the Studite, which task led them to visit Rome together. Their work was interrupted by a dispute between the Benedictine Abbey of St. Ouen and the chapter of Rouen, which was supported by the erudite Jean Saas. Tassin and his friend wrote against Saas in defence of their brethren.

They then resided at the Abbey of Rouen where they remained till 1747, when they were summoned to the Abbey of Saint-Germain-des-Prés, at Paris, by their general. To defend the authenticity of the deeds of their abbey they were obliged to make a deep study of diplomatics, dealing with diplomas, charters, and other official documents, for which Jean Mabillon had laid the foundations in his great Latin work, De re diplomatica (1681).

As a result of their researches they wrote the Nouveau traité de diplomatique, in six quarto volumes, which appeared between the years 1750 and 1765. Toustain died before the second volume had been entirely printed, and so Tassin saw the great work to completion. However, he wished the name of his friend to be associated with the project in its entirety, and consequently all the volumes are described as the work of "two Benedictines".

Tassin later wrote his Histoire littéraire de la Congrégation de Saint-Maur (Paris and Brussels, 1770), a model history containing the lives and list of works, printed or in manuscript, of all the learned authors of the Congregation, from its formation in 1618 until his own time, including a list of their works, printed or in manuscript. Several manuscript works of Tassin are in the Bibliothèque nationale in Paris. Tassin died in Paris.
