= Jean Mabillon =

French monk and scholar (1632–1707)

Dom Jean Mabillon O.S.B.
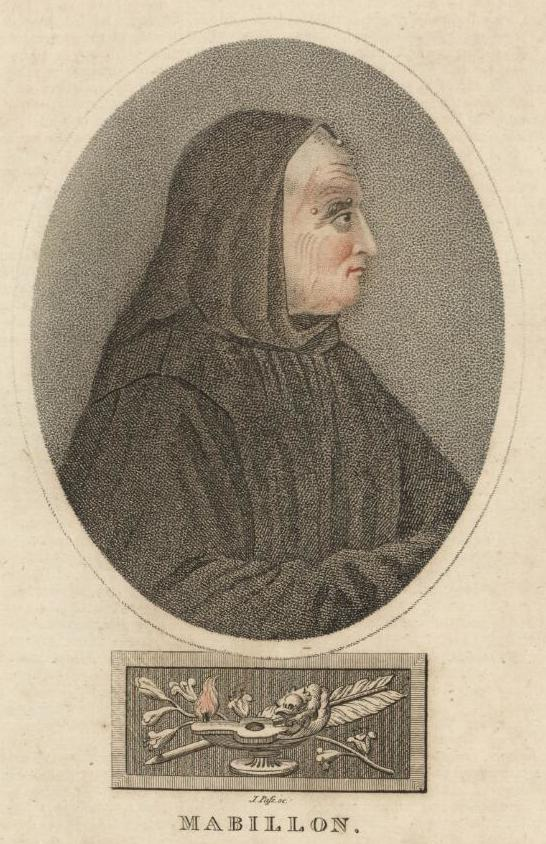
- Dom Jean Mabillon, O.S.B.

Personal life
- Born: 23 November 1632 Saint-Pierremont, province of Champagne, Ardennes
- Died: 27 December 1707 (aged 75) Paris, France
- Resting place: Church of Saint-Germain-des-Prés
- Parents: Estienne Mabillon (father); Jeanne Guérin (mother)
- Notable work: Acta Ordinis S. Benedicti
- Known for: De re diplomatica

Religious life
- Religion: Roman Catholicism
- Founder of: Palaeography and diplomatic
- School: Congregation of Saint Maur

Military service
- Rank: Monk

Dom Jean Mabillon O.S.B., (French pronunciation: [ʒɑ̃ mabijɔ̃]; 23 November 1632 – 27 December 1707) was a French Benedictine monk and scholar of the Congregation of Saint Maur. He is considered the founder of the disciplines of palaeography and diplomatics.

== Early life ==
Mabillon was born in the town of Saint-Pierremont, then in the ancient Province of Champagne, now a part of the Department of Ardennes. He was the son of Estienne Mabillon and his wife Jeanne Guérin. At the age of 12 he became a pupil at the Collège des Bons Enfants in Reims. Having entered the seminary in 1650, he left after three years and in 1653 became instead a monk in the Maurist Abbey of Saint-Remi. There his dedication to his studies left him ill, and in 1658 he was sent to Corbie Abbey to regain his strength. He was ordained at Corbie in 1660.

In 1663 he was transferred again to Saint-Denis Abbey near Paris, and the following year to the Abbey of Saint-Germain-des-Prés in Paris. This was a move which offered wide opportunities for scholarly acquaintances and Mabillon was to meet and work, among others, with Luc d'Achery, Charles du Fresne, sieur du Cange, Étienne Baluze, and Louis-Sébastien Le Nain de Tillemont.

== As editor and compiler ==
At Saint-Germain, Mabillon prepared an edition of the works of Saint Bernard of Clairvaux (published in 1667), and also worked on a monumental collection of the lives of the Benedictine Saints, under the title Acta Ordinis S. Benedicti (published in nine volumes between 1668 and 1701). The later work was undertaken in collaboration with Dom Luc d'Achery. This monk had long been the librarian of Saint-Germain-des-Prés and was senior to Mabillon. It was upon historical materials which d'Achery had collected that Mabillon drew for his Acta. A foreword subsequently added by Mabillon used the lives of the saints in order to illustrate the history of the early Middle Ages.

== De re diplomatica ==
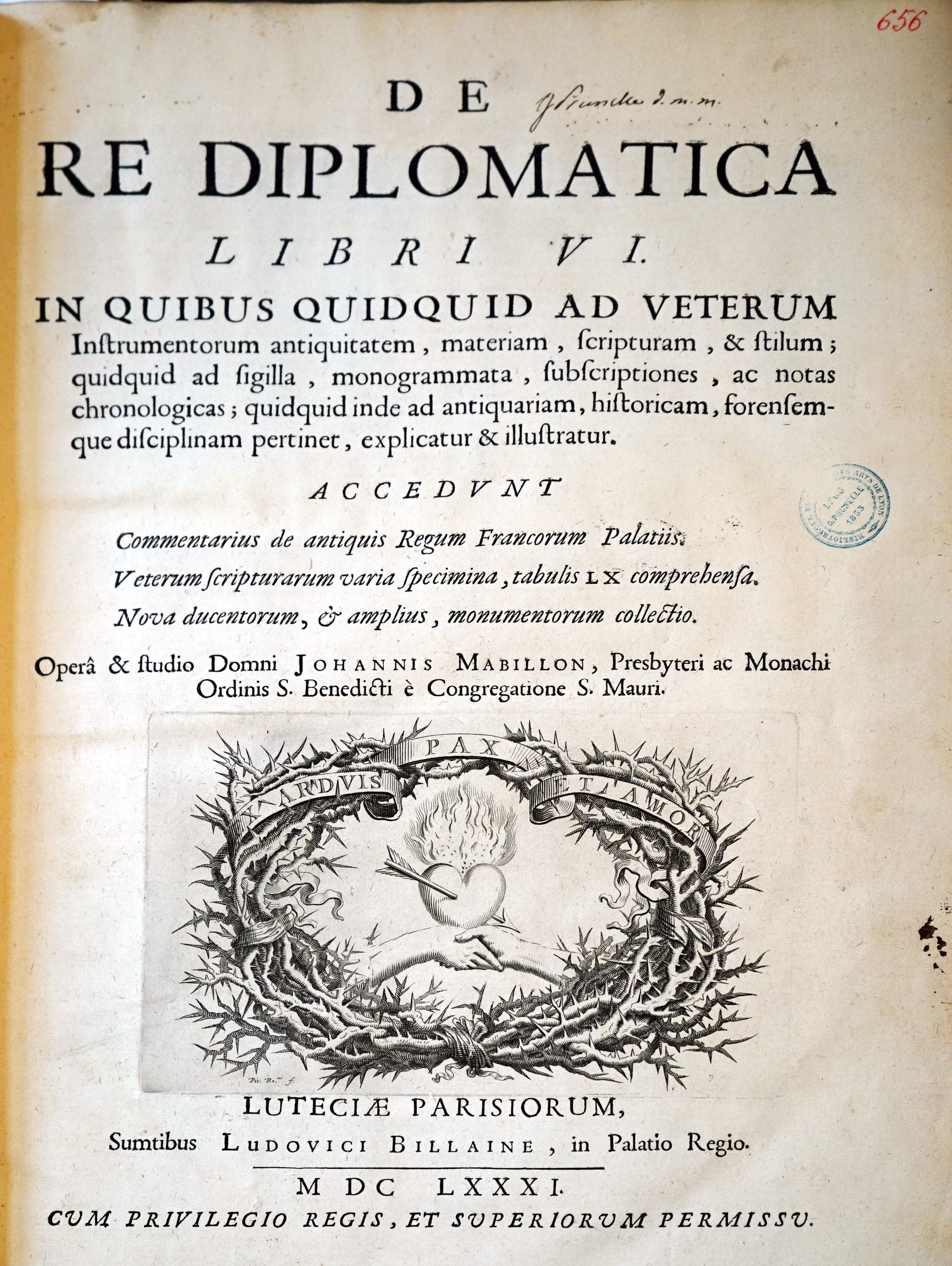
Title page of De re diplomatica (1681)

In 1681, prompted by the doubts raised by the Jesuit Daniel van Papenbroek over the authenticity of supposed Merovingian documents held at the Abbey of Saint-Denis, Mabillon published his De re diplomatica. This work investigated different types of medieval documents and manuscripts, including scrutiny of their script, style, seals, signatures, testimonia, and other intrinsic and extrinsic factors, using an acquired taste derived from long experience, and consulting the views of other document scholars. Manuscripts from many archives are addressed, and references made to items dating back to Dagobert I (King of the Franks, c. 629–639). Concerned often with "distinguishing genuine documents from forgeries" the work is now seen as the foundation work of palaeography and diplomatics. Mabillon writes:

I do not deny that in fact some documents are false and others interpolated, but all of them should not be dismissed for that reason. Rather, it is necessary to devise and hand down rules for distinguishing genuine manuscripts from those that are false and interpolated. ... I undertook this task after long familiarity and daily experience with these documents. For almost twenty years I had devoted my studies and energies to reading and examining ancient manuscripts and archives, and the published collections of ancient documents. ... I compared and weighed them with one another that I might be able to compile a body of knowledge which was not merely scanty and meager, but as accurate and as well-tested as possible in a field which had not been previously investigated.

This work brought Mabillon to the attention of Jean-Baptiste Colbert, who offered him a pension (which he declined), and King Louis XIV. He began to travel throughout Europe, to Flanders, Switzerland, Germany, and Italy, in search of medieval manuscripts and books for the royal library.

== Criticism ==
Some of the less scholarly monks in Mabillon's own abbey criticized his Lives for being too academic; while Armand de Rancé, Abbot of La Trappe, declared that he was breaking the rules of his Order by devoting his life to study rather than manual labour. He also caused trouble by denouncing the veneration of the relics of "unknown saints", wrote a controversial critique of the works of St. Augustine of Hippo, and was accused of Jansenism, but at all times he was supported by the king and the Church.

== Later career and legacy ==
Annales Ordinis Sancti Benedicti (1739)

In 1701 Mabillon was appointed by the king as one of the founding members of the Académie des Inscriptions et Belles-Lettres, and in 1704 a supplement to De re diplomatica was published. In 1707 he died and was buried in the church of Saint-Germain-des-Prés, in Paris.

According to Fritz Stern, writing in 1956, Mabillon was the "greatest historical scholar of his century".

The Mabillon station of the Paris Métro is named after him.

== See also ==
- Papal diplomatics
