= Yuan dynasty =

Mongol-led dynasty of China (1271–1368)

Coordinates: 39.915°N 116.390°E

Great Yuan: 大元; Dà Yuán (Chinese); ᠳᠠᠢ ᠦᠨ ᠶᠡᠬᠡ ᠮᠣᠩᠭᠤᠯ ᠤᠯᠤᠰ; Dai Ön Yeke Mongγol Ulus (Mongolian)
- 1271–1368 AD
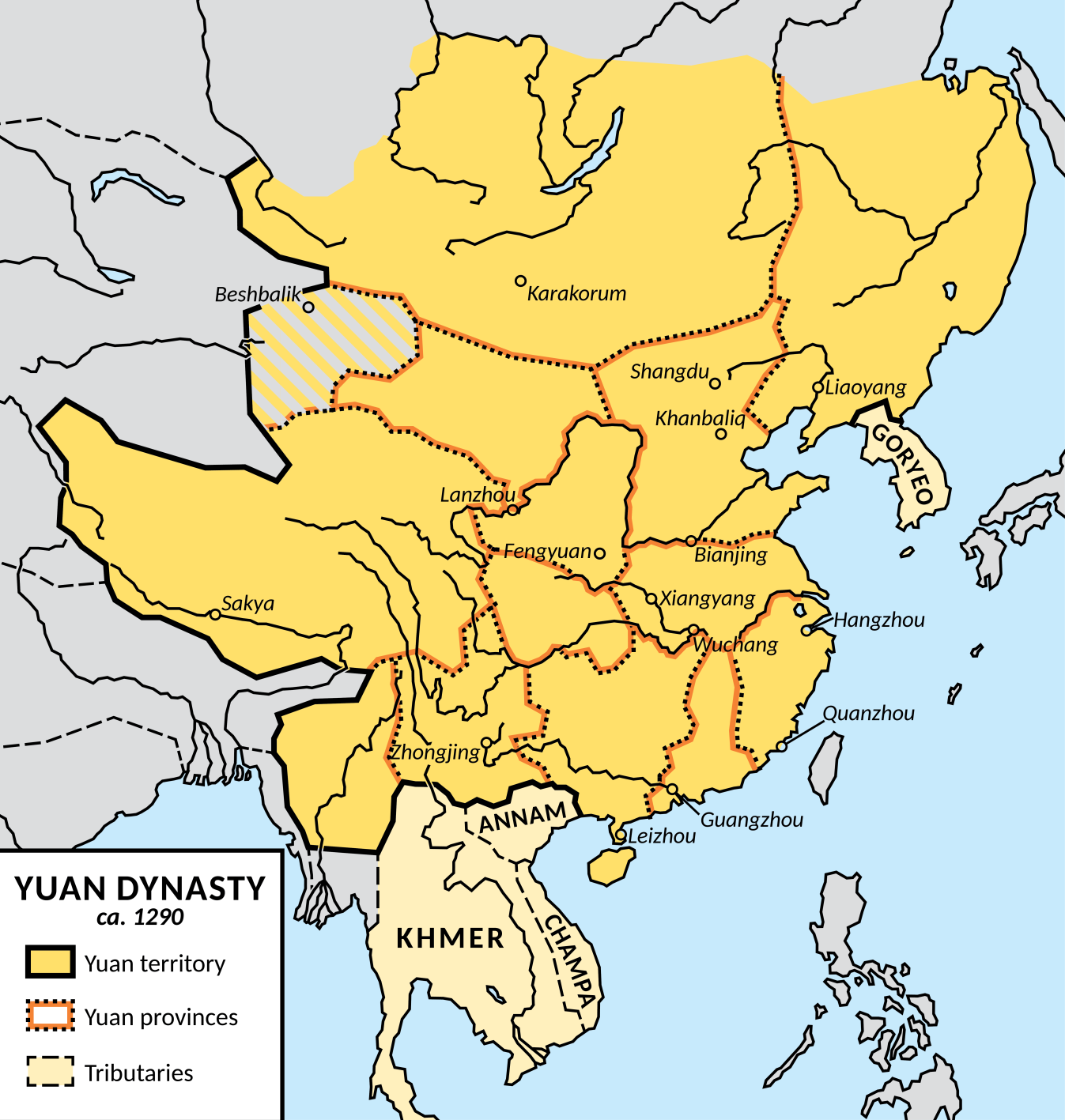
- Yuan dynasty (c. 1290) (Note: The precise status of Goryeo under Mongol rule is unclear. While Goryeo was a vassal of the Yuan dynasty, many scholars, such as Tan Qixiang, regard it as an autonomous state outside the Yuan territory; others regard it as an integral part of the Yuan territory.)
- Status: Khagan-ruled division of the Mongol Empire (Note: As per modern historiographical norm, the "Yuan dynasty" in this article refers exclusively to the realm based in Dadu (present-day Beijing). However, the Han-style dynastic name "Great Yuan" (大元) as proclaimed by Kublai in 1271, as well as the claim to Chinese political orthodoxy were meant to be applied to the entire Mongol Empire. In spite of this, "Yuan dynasty" is rarely used in the broad sense of the definition by modern scholars due to the disintegrated nature of the Mongol Empire.); Conquest dynasty of Imperial China
- Capital: Dadu (now Beijing); Shangdu (summer capital)
- Common languages: Middle Mongol; Chinese (Old Mandarin); Old Uyghur
- Official script: ʼPhags-pa script
- Religion: Buddhism, Confucianism, Taoism, Shamanism, Tengrism, Chinese Hinduism, Nestorian Christianity, Chinese folk religion, Catholic Christianity, Judaism, Manichaeism, Islam
- Government: Monarchy
- Emperor (Note: Since the enthronement of Genghis Khan (成吉思皇帝; Chéngjísī huángdì) in Spring 1206. Decades before Kublai Khan announced the dynastic name "Great Yuan" in 1271, the Great Mongol State (Yeke Mongγol Ulus) already used the Han-style title of emperor (皇帝; Huángdì) to translate the Mongolian title Khagan (合罕; Héhàn, Great Khan). Although Kublai Khan announced that he inherited the Mongol throne, the Toluid Civil War broke out due to opposition from other Mongols.)
  - 1260–1294: Kublai Khan (first)
  - 1332–1368: Toghon Temür (last)
- Chancellor
  - 1264–1282: Ahmad Fanakati
  - 1340–1355: Toqto'a
- Historical era: Post-classical history
  - Kublai proclaimed emperor: 5 May 1260
  - Kublai's proclamation of the dynastic name "Great Yuan": 5 November 1271
  - Battle of Xiangyang: 1268–1273
  - Conquest of Southern Song: 4 February 1276
  - Battle of Yamen: 19 March 1279
  - Red Turban Rebellion: 1351–1368
  - Fall of Dadu: 14 September 1368
  - Formation of Northern Yuan dynasty: 1368–1388

Area
- 1310: 11,000,000 km^{2} (4,200,000 sq mi)

Population
  - 1351 est.: 87,587,000
- Currency: Jiaochao banknotes, Chinese cash
Preceded by
Mongol Empire
Song dynasty
Succeeded by
Northern Yuan
Ming dynasty
Phagmodrupa dynasty

The Yuan dynasty, (Note: /jɜːn/ YEN; Chinese: 元朝; pinyin: Yuáncháo) officially the Great Yuan, (Note: 大元; Dà Yuán; Mongolian: ᠶᠡᠬᠡ ᠶᠤᠸᠠᠨ ᠤᠯᠤᠰ, Yeke Yuwan Ulus, lit. 'Great Yuan State' (Note: Modern Mongolian form commonly used by Chinese and Mongolian academics: Middle Mongolian: ᠳᠠᠢ ᠦᠨ ᠶᠡᠬᠡ ᠮᠣᠩᠭᠣᠯ ᠤᠯᠤᠰ, Dai Ön Yeke Mongghul Ulus or Их Юань улс in Modern Mongolian Cyrillic, Ikh Yuan Üls / Yekhe Yuan Ulus.)) was a Mongol-led imperial dynasty of China and a successor state to the Mongol Empire after its division. It was established by Kublai (Emperor Shizu or Setsen Khan), the fifth khagan-emperor of the Mongol Empire from the Borjigin clan, and lasted from 1271 to 1368 CE. In Chinese history, the Yuan dynasty followed the Song dynasty and preceded the Ming dynasty.

Although Genghis Khan's enthronement as khagan in 1206 was described in Chinese as the Han-style title of emperor and the Mongol Empire had ruled territories including modern-day northern China for decades, it was not until 1271 that Kublai Khan officially proclaimed the dynasty in the traditional Han style, and the conquest was not complete until 1279 when the Southern Song dynasty was defeated in the Battle of Yamen. His realm was, by this point, isolated from the other Mongol-led khanates and controlled most of modern-day China and its surrounding areas, including modern-day Mongolia. It was the first dynasty founded by a non-Han ethnicity that ruled all of China proper. In 1368, following the defeat of the Yuan forces by the Ming dynasty, the Genghisid rulers retreated to the Mongolian Plateau and continued to rule until 1635 when they surrendered to the Later Jin dynasty (which later evolved into the Qing dynasty); this rump state is known in Chinese history as the Northern Yuan.

After the division of the Mongol Empire, the Yuan dynasty was the khanate ruled by the successors of Möngke. In official Chinese histories, the Yuan dynasty bore the Mandate of Heaven. The dynasty was established by Kublai Khan, yet he placed his grandfather Genghis Khan on the imperial records as the official founder of the dynasty and accorded him the temple name Taizu. In the edict titled Proclamation of the Dynastic Name issued in 1271, Kublai announced the name of the new dynasty as Great Yuan and claimed the succession of former Chinese dynasties from the Three Sovereigns and Five Emperors to the Tang dynasty. Some of the Yuan emperors mastered the Chinese language, while others only used their native Mongolian language, written with the ʼPhags-pa script.

Kublai, as a khagan (great khan) of the Mongol Empire from 1260, had claimed supremacy over the other successor Mongol khanates: the Chagatai, the Golden Horde, and the Ilkhanate, before proclaiming as the emperor of China in 1271. As such, the Yuan was also sometimes referred to as the Empire of the Great Khan. However, even though the claim of supremacy by the Yuan emperors was recognized by the western khans in 1304, their subservience was nominal and each continued its own separate development.

== Name ==
Yuan dynasty
- Chinese: 元朝
- Literal meaning: "Yuan dynasty"
Transcriptions
Standard Mandarin
- Hanyu Pinyin: Yuán cháo
- Bopomofo: ㄩㄢˊ ㄔㄠˊ
- Wade–Giles: Yüan^{2} ch‘ao^{2}
- Tongyong Pinyin: Yuán cháo
- IPA: [ɥɛ̌n ʈʂʰǎʊ]
Wu
- Suzhounese: Gnioe^{2} zau^{2}
Yue: Cantonese
- Yale Romanization: Yùhn chìuh
- Jyutping: Jyun4 ciu4
- IPA: [jyn˩ tsʰiw˩]
Southern Min
- Tâi-lô: Guân tiâo

Dynastic name
- Chinese: 大元
- Literal meaning: Great Yuan
Transcriptions
Standard Mandarin
- Hanyu Pinyin: Dà Yuán
- Bopomofo: ㄉㄚˋ ㄩㄢˊ
- Wade–Giles: Ta^{4} Yüan^{2}
- Tongyong Pinyin: Dà Yuán
- IPA: [tâ ɥɛ̌n]
Yue: Cantonese
- Jyutping: daai6 jyun4
- IPA: [taj˨ jyn˩]

Alternative official full name: ᠳᠠᠢ ᠶᠤᠸᠠᠨ ᠶᠡᠬᠡ ᠮᠣᠩᠭᠣᠯ ᠤᠯᠤᠰ Dai Yuwan Yeqe Mongɣul Ulus
- Traditional Chinese: 大元大蒙古國
- Simplified Chinese: 大元大蒙古国
- Literal meaning: "Great Yuan" (Middle Mongol transliteration of Chinese "Dà Yuán") Great Mongol State
Transcriptions
Standard Mandarin
- Hanyu Pinyin: Dà Yuán Dà Měnggǔ Guó
- Bopomofo: ㄉㄚˋ ㄩㄢˊ ㄉㄚˋ ㄇㄥˇ ㄍㄨˇ ㄍㄨㄛˊ
- Wade–Giles: Ta^{4} Yüan^{2} Ta^{4} Meng^{3}-ku^{3} Kuo^{2}
- Tongyong Pinyin: Dà Yuán Dà Měng-gǔ Guó
- IPA: [tâ ɥɛ̌n tâ mə̀ŋ.kù kwǒ]

In 1271, Kublai Khan imposed the name Great Yuan (Chinese: 大元; pinyin: Dà Yuán), establishing the Yuan dynasty. According to the "Decree on the Establishment of the National Title", Dà Yuán (大元) refers to a clause on the first hexagram (乾; Qian) from the Commentaries on the I Ching which states , "great indeed is the primal unity" (大哉乾元; dà zāi Qián Yuán; 'Great is Qián', 'the Primal'). The abbreviated dynastic name "Yuan" (元) was also widely used during the Yuan period. Examples include expressions such as Huáng Yuán (皇元, "Imperial Yuan") and Wǒ Yuán (我元, "Our Yuan"), both of which employ only the single character Yuán to denote the dynasty.

The Mongolian-language counterpart was Dai Ön Ulus. The Chinese term Dà Yuán was rendered as Dai Ön in Mongolian and often used in conjunction with (or sometimes replaced by) the term "Yeqe Mongɣul Ulus" ("Great Mongol State"). Dual language Chinese-Mongolian steles from 1335, 1338, and 1362 paired Chinese inscriptions such as Huáng Yuán ("Imperial Yuan") and Dà Yuán ("Great Yuan") with Mongolian inscriptions including Yeqe Mongɣul Ulus, Dai Ön qemeqü Yeqe Mongɣol Ulus (lit. "Great Mongol State called Great Yuan"), and Dai Ön Yeqe Mongɣol Ulus (lit. "Great Yuan Great Mongol State"). The name "Great Yuan" was also officially used in Yuan-era Tibet on the seals of the Imperial Preceptors affixed to Tibetan-language decrees.

As per contemporary historiographical norm, "Yuan dynasty" typically refers to the realm with its main capital in Dadu (modern-day Beijing). While the name Yuan was understood among Han Chinese literati during the Yuan era to be the dynastic title adopted by Kublai for the dynasty he founded in China, Mongols of the Yuan dynasty saw Da Yuan as the Chinese expression for Yeke Mongghol Ulus, the Mongolian name for the Mongol Empire despite the empire's division. The western khanates are not known to have referred to the Mongol Empire (or its division) as Da Yuan. While the Yuan rulers claimed supremacy over all Mongol successor states, in practice the other khanates were independent.

After the fall of the Yuan dynasty in 1368, the title "Great Yuan" continued to be used by the Yuan remnants who retreated to Mongolia, known as the Northern Yuan (1368–1635) until 1388, but certain Mongol leaders still evoked the name on occasion up to the early 17th century.

The Yuan dynasty is sometimes also called the "Mongol dynasty" by westerners, akin to the Qing dynasty sometimes being referred to as the "Manchu dynasty" or "Manchu Dynasty of China".

== History ==
=== Background ===
Genghis Khan united the Mongol tribes of the steppes and became Great Khan in 1206. He and his successors expanded the Mongol empire across Asia. Under the reign of Genghis' third son, Ögedei Khan, the Mongols destroyed the weakened Jin dynasty in 1234, conquering most of northern China. Ögedei offered his nephew Kublai a position in Xingzhou, Hebei. Kublai was unable to read Chinese but had several Han teachers attached to him since his early years by his mother Sorghaghtani. He sought the counsel of Chinese Buddhist and Confucian advisers. Möngke Khan succeeded Ögedei's son, Güyük, as Great Khan in 1251. He granted his brother Kublai control over Mongol held territories in China. Kublai built schools for Confucian scholars, issued paper money, revived Chinese rituals, and endorsed policies that stimulated agricultural and commercial growth. He adopted as his capital city Kaiping in Inner Mongolia, later renamed Shangdu.

Many Han Chinese and Khitan defected to the Mongols to fight against the Jin. Two Han Chinese leaders, Shi Tianze, Liu Heima (劉黑馬, aka Liu Ni), and the Khitan Xiao Zhala (蕭札剌) defected and commanded the 3 Tumens in the Mongol army. Liu Heima and Shi Tianze served Ögedei Khan. Liu Heima and Shi Tianxiang led armies against Western Xia for the Mongols. There were 4 Han Tumens and 3 Khitan Tumens, with each Tumen consisting of 10,000 troops. The three Khitan Generals Shimobeidier (石抹孛迭兒), Tabuyir (塔不已兒), and Zhongxi, the son of Xiaozhaci (蕭札刺之子重喜) commanded the three Khitan Tumens and the four Han Generals Zhang Rou, Yan Shi, Shi Tianze, and Liu Heima commanded the four Han tumens under Ögedei Khan.

Möngke Khan commenced a military campaign against the Chinese Song dynasty in southern China. The Mongol force that invaded southern China was far greater than the force they sent to invade the Middle East in 1256. He died in 1259 without a successor at the Siege of Diaoyucheng. Kublai returned from fighting the Song in 1260 when he learned that his brother, Ariq Böke, was challenging his claim to the throne. Kublai convened a kurultai in Kaiping that elected him Great Khan. A rival kurultai in Mongolia proclaimed Ariq Böke Great Khan, beginning a civil war. Kublai depended on the cooperation of his Chinese subjects to ensure that his army received ample resources. He bolstered his popularity among his subjects by modeling his government on the bureaucracy of traditional Chinese dynasties and adopting the Chinese era name of Zhongtong. Ariq Böke was hampered by inadequate supplies and surrendered in 1264. All of the three western khanates (Golden Horde, Chagatai Khanate and Ilkhanate) became functionally autonomous, and only the Ilkhans truly recognized Kublai as Great Khan. Civil strife had permanently divided the Mongol Empire.

=== Rule of Kublai Khan ===
==== Early years ====
Instability troubled the early years of Kublai Khan's reign. Ögedei's grandson Kaidu refused to submit to Kublai and threatened the western frontier of Kublai's domain. The hostile but weakened Song dynasty remained an obstacle in the south. Kublai secured the northeast border in 1259 by installing the hostage prince Wonjong as the ruler of the Kingdom of Goryeo (Korea), making it a Mongol tributary state. Kublai betrothed one of his daughters to the prince to solidify the relationship between the two houses. Korean women were sent to the Yuan court as tribute and one concubine became the empress of the Yuan dynasty. Kublai was also threatened by domestic unrest. Li Tan, the son-in-law of a powerful official, instigated a revolt against Mongol rule in 1262. After successfully suppressing the revolt, Kublai curbed the influence of the Han advisers in his court. He feared that his dependence on Chinese officials left him vulnerable to future revolts and defections to the Song.

Kublai's government after 1262 was a compromise between preserving Mongol interests in China and satisfying the demands of his Chinese subjects. He instituted the reforms proposed by his Chinese advisers by centralizing the bureaucracy, expanding the circulation of paper money, and maintaining the traditional monopolies on salt and iron. He restored the Imperial Secretariat and left the local administrative structure of past Chinese dynasties unchanged. However, Kublai rejected plans to revive the Confucian imperial examinations and divided Yuan society into three classes with the Han occupying the lowest rank until the conquest of the Song dynasty and its people, who made up the fourth class, the Southern Chinese. Kublai's Chinese advisers still wielded significant power in the government, sometimes more than high officials, but their official rank was nebulous.

==== Founding the dynasty ====
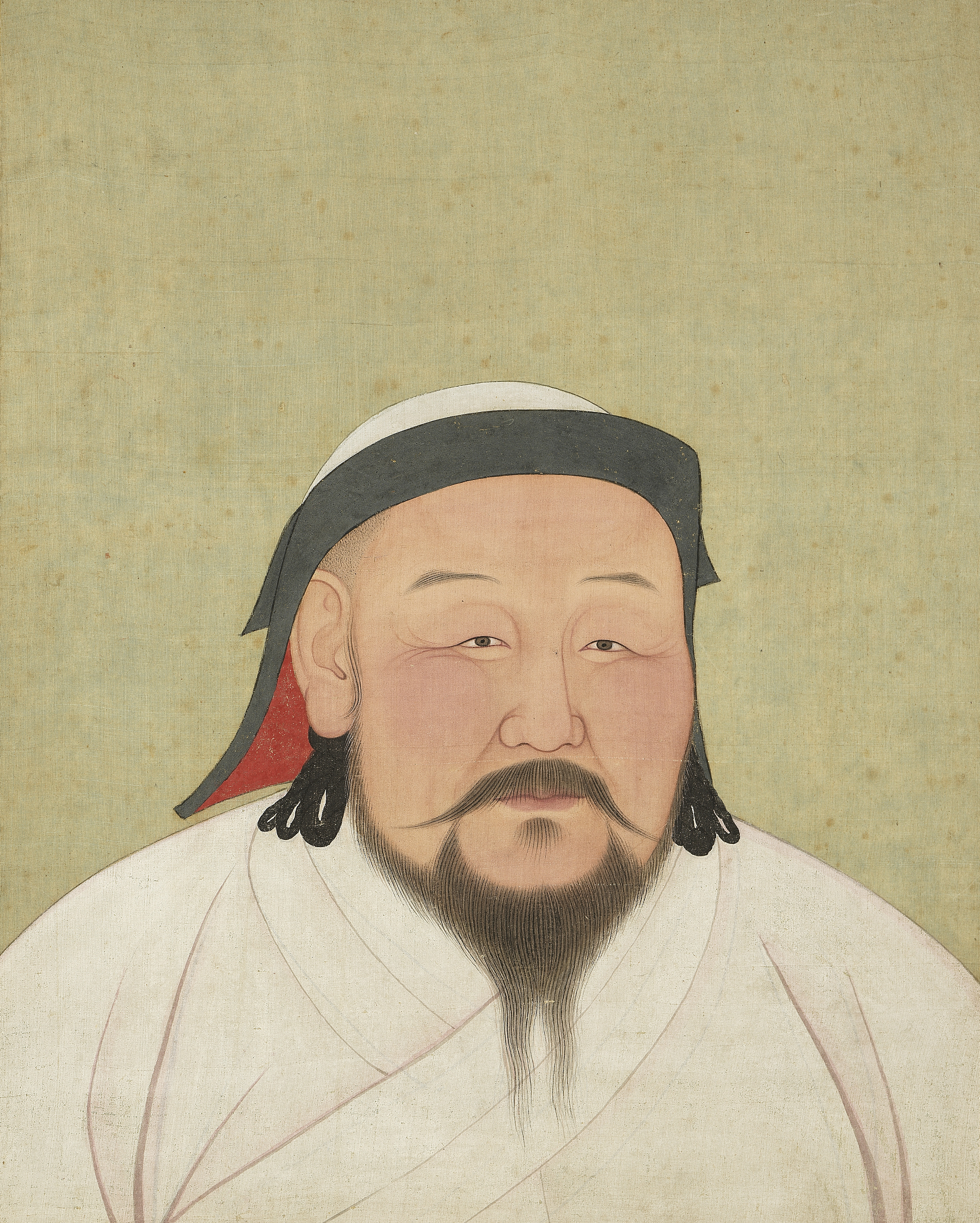
Kublai Khan, founder of the Yuan dynasty

Kublai readied the move of the Mongol capital from Karakorum in Mongolia to Khanbaliq in 1264, constructing a new city near the former Jurchen capital Zhongdu, now modern Beijing, in 1266. In 1271, Kublai formally claimed the Mandate of Heaven and declared that 1272 was the first year of the Great Yuan (大元) in the style of a traditional Chinese dynasty. The name of the dynasty is first attested in the I Ching and describes the "origin of the universe" or a "primal force". Kublai proclaimed Khanbaliq the Daidu (大都; Dàdū; 'Great Capital') of the dynasty. The era name was changed to Zhiyuan to herald a new era of Chinese history. The adoption of a dynastic name legitimized Mongol rule by integrating the government into the narrative of traditional Chinese political succession. Kublai evoked his public image as a sage emperor by following the rituals of Confucian propriety and ancestor veneration, while simultaneously retaining his roots as a leader from the steppes.

Kublai Khan promoted commercial, scientific, and cultural growth. He supported the merchants of the Silk Road trade network by protecting the Mongol postal system, constructing infrastructure, providing loans that financed trade caravans, and encouraging the circulation of paper jiaochao banknotes. During the beginning of the Yuan dynasty, the Mongols continued issuing coins; however, under Külüg Khan coins were completely replaced by paper money. It was not until the reign of Toghon Temür that the government of the Yuan dynasty would attempt to reintroduce copper coinage for circulation. The Pax Mongolica, Mongol peace, enabled the spread of technologies, commodities, and culture between China and the West. Kublai expanded the Grand Canal from southern China to Daidu in the north. Mongol rule was cosmopolitan under Kublai Khan. He welcomed foreign visitors to his court, such as the Venetian merchant Marco Polo, who wrote the most influential European account of Yuan China. Marco Polo's travels would later inspire many others like Christopher Columbus to chart a passage to the Far East in search of its legendary wealth.

==== Military conquests and campaigns ====
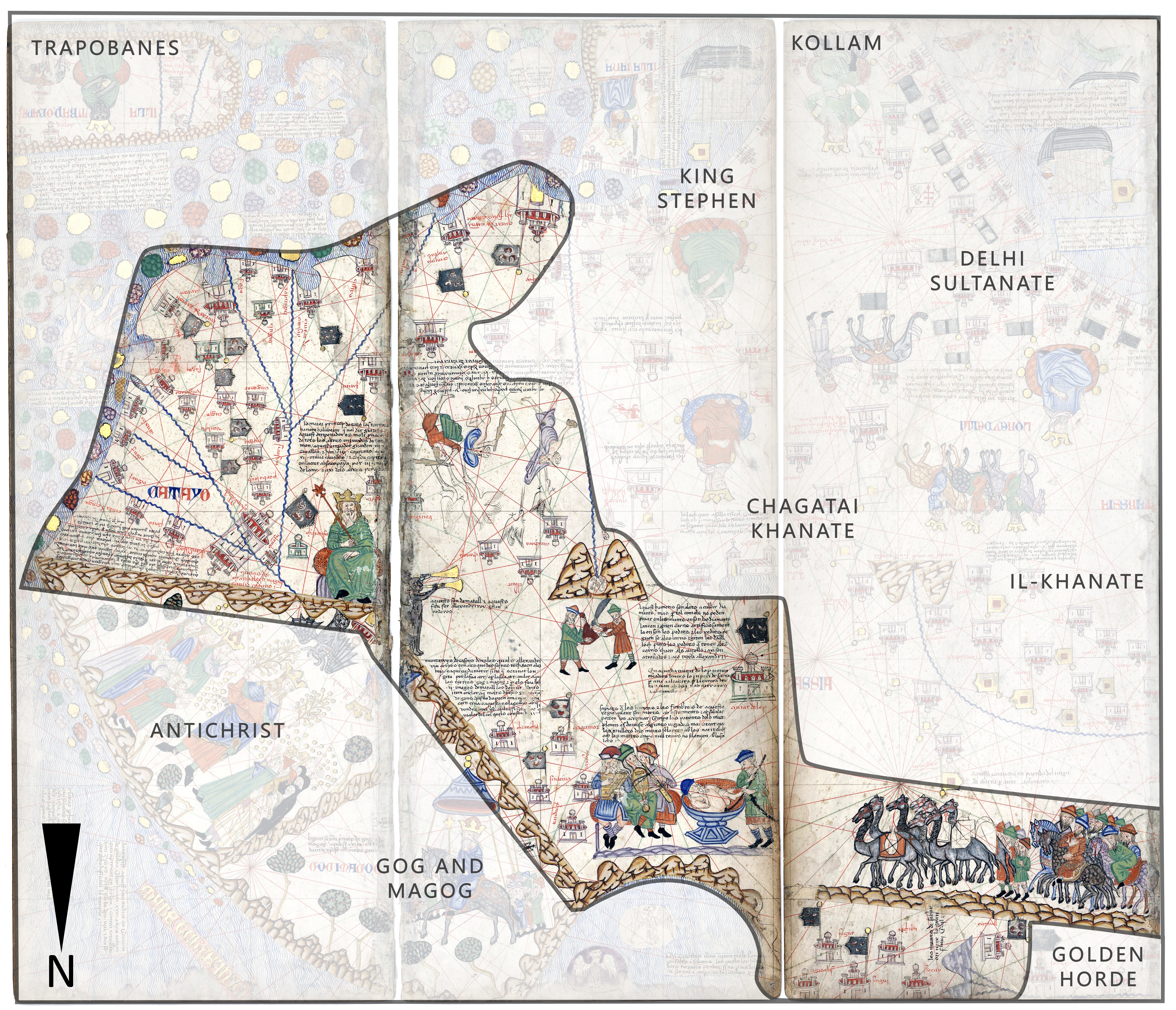
Empire of the Great Khan ("Catayo" for Cathay) according to the Catalan Atlas (1375, rotated 180°). Xinjiang with its caravan of traders appears in the bottom right corner, while the Pacific coast runs along the top-left corner. Kublai Khan is seen enthroned. A flag with three red crescent moons appears on all the territory.

After strengthening his government in northern China, Kublai pursued an expansionist policy in line with the tradition of Mongol and Chinese imperialism. He renewed a massive drive against the Song dynasty to the south. Kublai besieged Xiangyang between 1268 and 1273, the last obstacle in his way to capture the rich Yangtze River basin. An unsuccessful naval expedition was undertaken against Japan in 1274. The Duan family ruling the Kingdom of Dali in Yunnan submitted to the Yuan dynasty as vassals and were allowed to keep their throne, militarily assisting the Yuan dynasty against the Song dynasty in southern China.

The Duan family still ruled Dali relatively independently during the Yuan dynasty. The Tusi chieftains and local tribe leaders and kingdoms in Yunnan, Guizhou and Sichuan submitted to Yuan rule and were allowed to keep their titles. The Han Chinese Yang family ruling the Chiefdom of Bozhou, which was recognized by both the Song and Tang dynasty, also received recognition by the Mongols in the Yuan dynasty, and later by the Ming dynasty. The Luo clan in Shuixi led by Ahua were recognized by the Yuan emperors, as they were by the Song emperors when led by Pugui and Tang emperors when led by Apei. They descended from the Three Kingdoms era king Huoji who legendarily helped Zhuge Liang against Meng Huo. They were also recognized by the Ming dynasty.

In 1276 Kublai captured the Song capital of Hangzhou (杭州), the wealthiest city of China, after the surrender of the Southern Song Han Chinese Emperor Gong of Song. Emperor Gong was married off to a Mongol princess of the royal Borjigin family of the Yuan dynasty. Song loyalists escaped from the capital and enthroned a young child as Emperor Bing of Song, who was Emperor Gong's younger brother. The Yuan forces commanded by Han Chinese General Zhang Hongfan led a predominantly Han navy to defeat the Song loyalists at the battle of Yamen in 1279. The last Song emperor drowned, bringing an end to the Song dynasty. The conquest of the Song reunited northern and southern China for the first time in three hundred years.

The Yuan dynasty created the "Han Army" (漢軍) out of defected Jin troops and an army of defected Song troops called the "Newly Submitted Army" (新附軍).

Kublai's government faced financial difficulties after 1279. Wars and construction projects had drained the Mongol treasury. Efforts to raise and collect tax revenues were plagued by corruption and political scandals. Mishandled military expeditions followed the financial problems. Kublai's second invasion of Japan in 1281 failed because of an inauspicious typhoon. Kublai botched his campaigns against Annam, Champa, and Java, but won a Pyrrhic victory against Burma. The expeditions were hampered by disease, an inhospitable climate, and a tropical terrain unsuitable for the mounted warfare of the Mongols. The Trần dynasty which ruled Annam (Đại Việt) defeated the Mongols at the Battle of Bạch Đằng (1288). Annam, Burma, and Champa recognized Mongol hegemony and established tributary relations with the Yuan dynasty.

Internal strife threatened Kublai within his empire. Kublai Khan suppressed rebellions challenging his rule in Tibet and the northeast. His favourite wife died in 1281 and so did his chosen heir in 1285. Kublai grew despondent and retreated from his duties as emperor. He fell ill in 1293, and died on 18 February 1294.

=== Successors after Kublai ===
==== Temür Khan ====
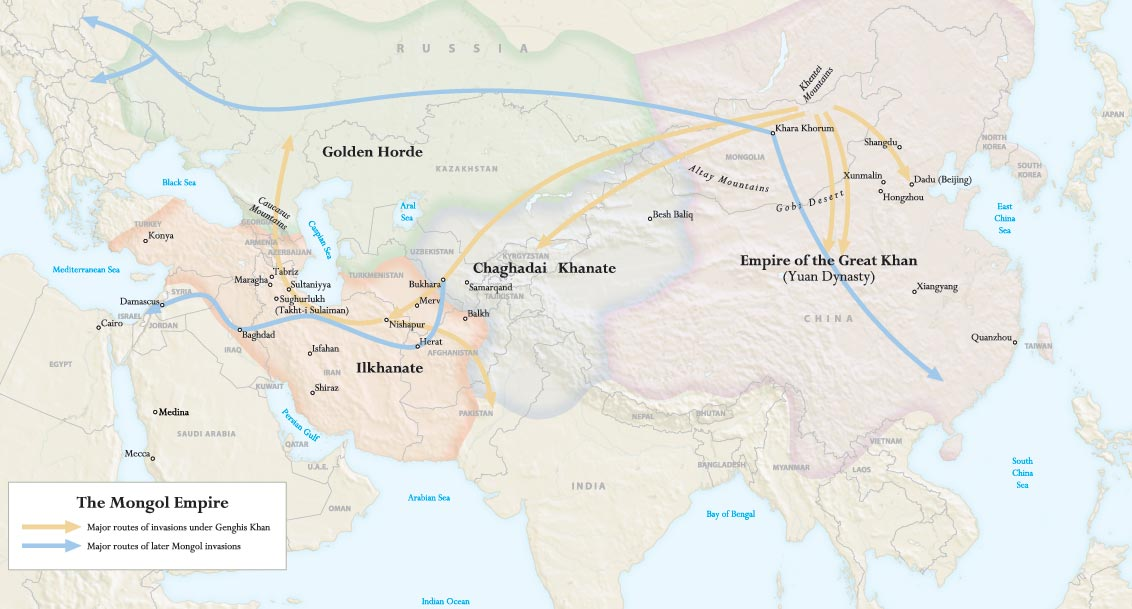
Mongol successor khanates

Following the conquest of Dali in 1253, the former ruling Duan family were appointed as its leaders. Local chieftains were appointed as Tusi, recognized as imperial officials by the Yuan, Ming, and Qing-era governments, principally in the province of Yunnan. Succession for the Yuan dynasty, however, was an intractable problem, later causing much strife and internal struggle. This emerged as early as the end of Kublai's reign. Kublai originally named his eldest son, Zhenjin, as the crown prince, but he died before Kublai in 1285. Thus, Zhenjin's third son, with the support of his mother Kökejin and the minister Bayan, succeeded the throne and ruled as Temür Khan, or Emperor Chengzong, from 1294 to 1307. Temür Khan decided to maintain and continue much of the work begun by his grandfather. He also made peace with the western Mongol khanates as well as neighboring countries such as Vietnam, which recognized his nominal suzerainty and paid tributes for a few decades. However, the corruption in the Yuan dynasty began during the reign of Temür Khan.

==== Külüg Khan ====
Külüg Khan (Emperor Wuzong) came to the throne after the death of Temür Khan. Unlike his predecessor, he did not continue Kublai's work, largely rejecting his objectives. Most significantly he introduced monetary reforms and printed new banknotes. During his short reign (1307–11), the government fell into financial difficulties, partly due to bad decisions made by Külüg. By the time he died, China was in severe debt and the Yuan court faced popular discontent.

==== Ayurbarwada Buyantu Khan ====
The fourth Yuan emperor, Buyantu Khan (born Ayurbarwada), was a competent emperor. He was the first Yuan emperor to actively support and adopt mainstream Chinese culture after the reign of Kublai, to the discontent of some Mongol elite. He had been mentored by Li Meng (李孟), a Confucian academic. He made many reforms, including the liquidation of the Department of State Affairs (尚書省), which resulted in the execution of five of the highest-ranking officials. Starting in 1313 the traditional imperial examinations were reintroduced for prospective officials, testing their knowledge on significant historical works. Also, he codified much of the law, as well as publishing or translating a number of Chinese books and works.

==== Gegeen Khan and Yesün Temür ====
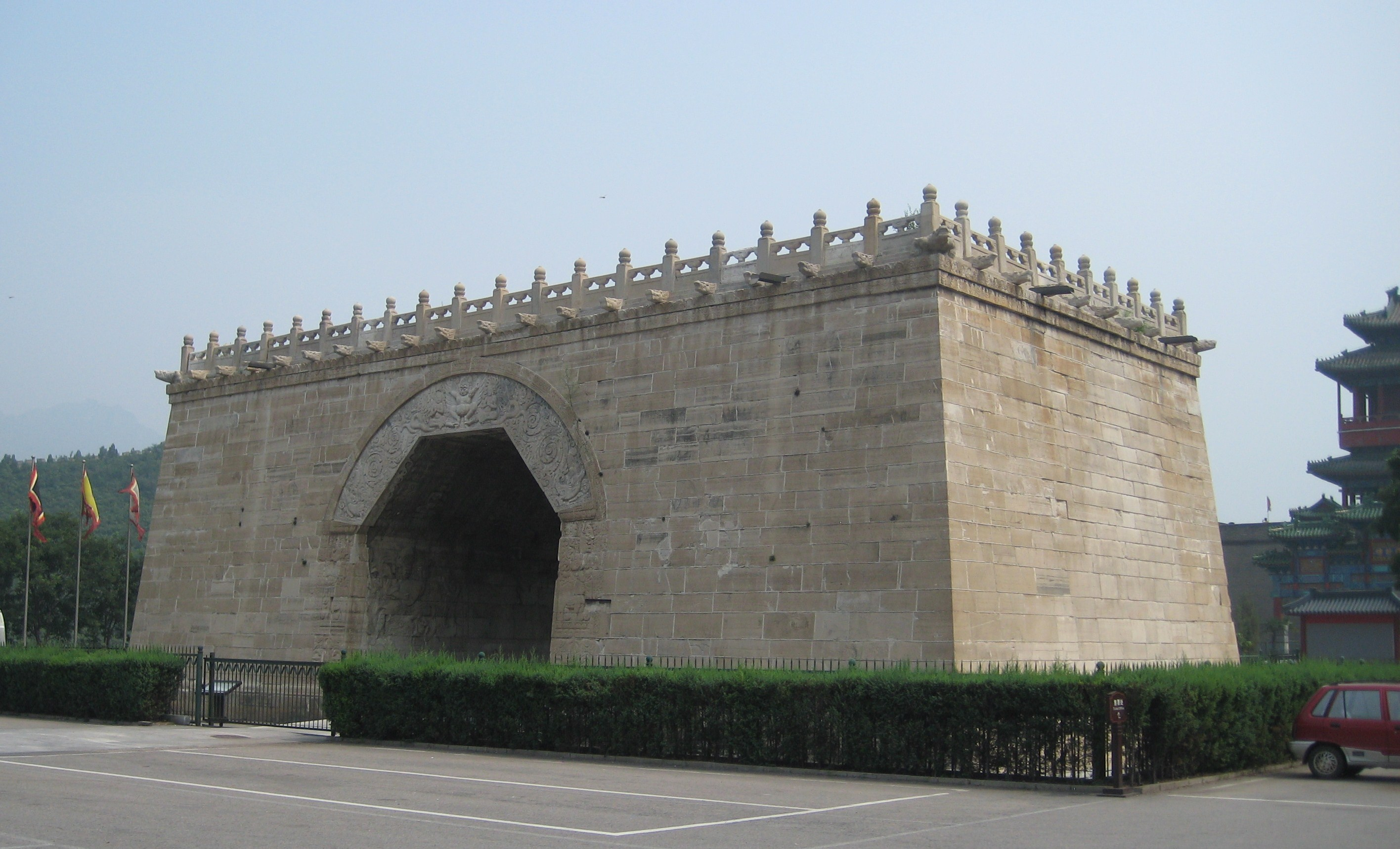
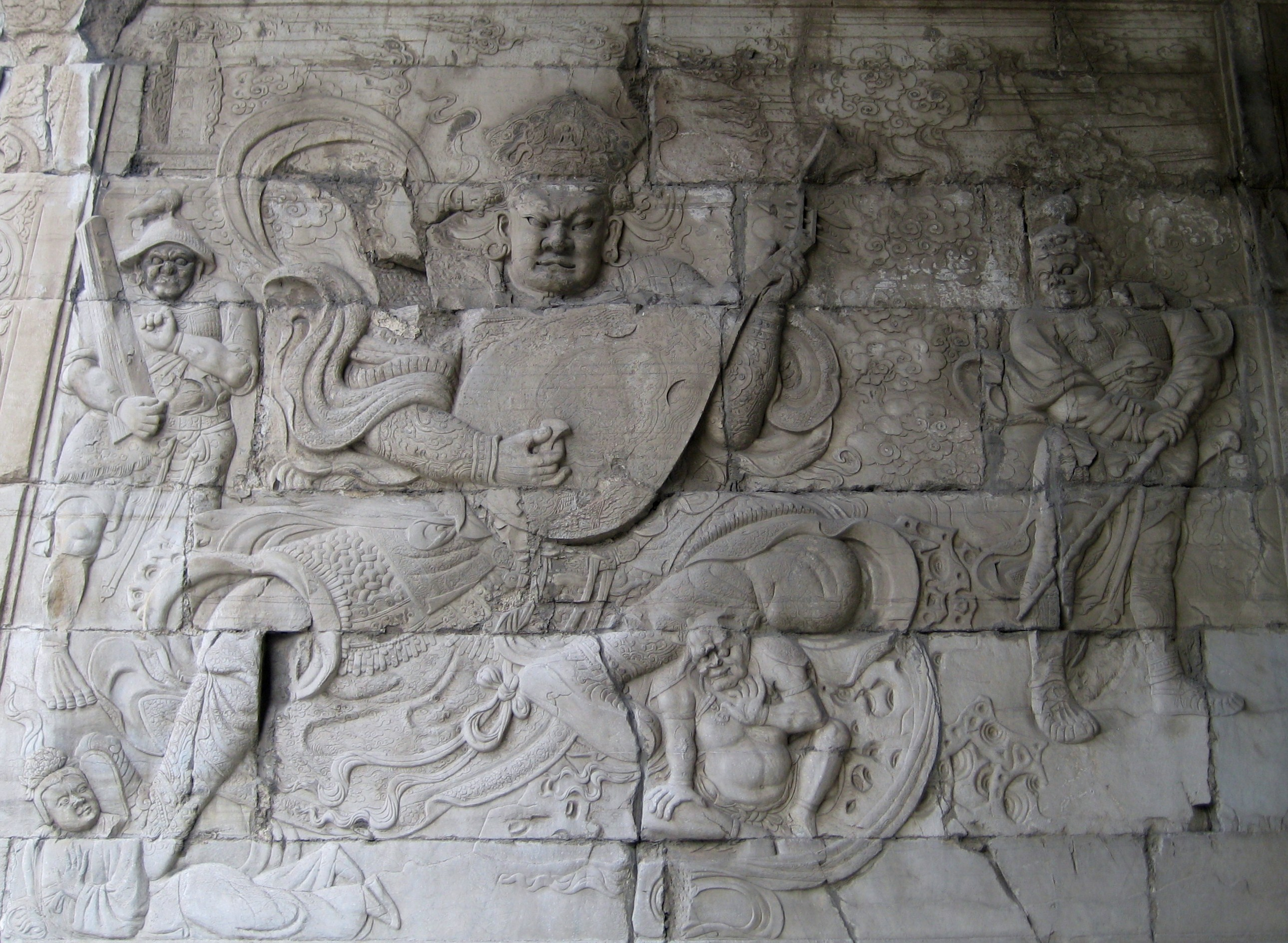
The Cloud Platform was created during the reign of Emperor Huizong by imperial command.

Emperor Gegeen Khan, Ayurbarwada's son and successor, ruled for only two years, from 1321 to 1323. He continued his father's policies to reform the government based on the Confucian principles, with the help of his newly appointed grand chancellor Baiju. During his reign, the Da Yuan Tong Zhi (大元通制; ''Comprehensive Institutions of the Great Yuan''), a huge collection of codes and regulations of the Yuan dynasty begun by his father, was formally promulgated. Gegeen was assassinated in a coup involving five princes from a rival faction, perhaps steppe elite opposed to Confucian reforms. They placed Yesün Temür (or Taidingdi) on the throne, and, after an unsuccessful attempt to calm the princes, he also succumbed to regicide.

Before Yesün Temür's reign, China had been relatively free from popular rebellions after the reign of Kublai. Yuan control, however, began to break down in those regions inhabited by ethnic minorities. The occurrence of these revolts and the subsequent suppression aggravated the financial difficulties of the Yuan government. The government had to adopt some measure to increase revenue, such as selling offices, as well as curtailing its spending on some items.

==== Jayaatu Khan Tugh Temür ====
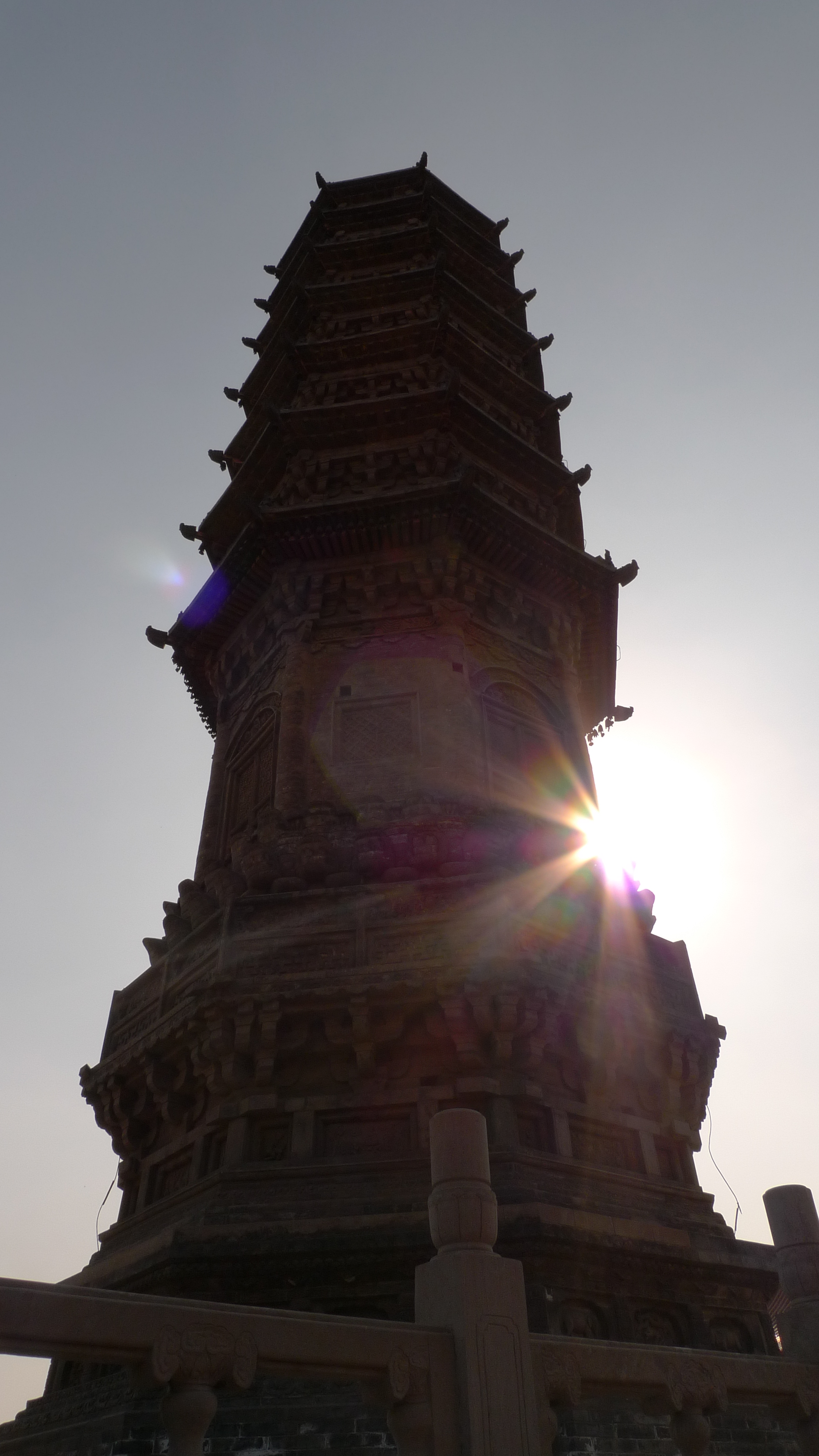
The Bailin Temple Pagoda of Zhaoxian County, Hebei Province, built in 1330 during the Yuan dynasty

When Yesün Temür died in Shangdu in 1328, Tugh Temür was recalled to Khanbaliq by the Qipchaq commander El Temür. He was installed as emperor in Khanbaliq, while Yesün Temür's son Ragibagh succeeded to the throne in Shangdu (商都) with the support of Yesün Temür's favourite retainer Dawlat Shah. Gaining support from princes and officers in Northern China and some other parts of the dynasty, Khanbaliq-based Tugh Temür eventually won the civil war against Ragibagh known as the War of the Two Capitals. Afterwards, Tugh Temür abdicated in favour of his brother Kusala, who was backed by Chagatai Khan Eljigidey, and announced Khanbaliq's intent to welcome him. However, Kusala suddenly died only four days after a banquet with Tugh Temür. He was supposedly killed with poison by El Temür, and Tugh Temür then remounted the throne. Tugh Temür also managed to send delegates to the western Mongol khanates such as Golden Horde and Ilkhanate to be accepted as the suzerain of Mongol world. However, he was mainly a puppet of the powerful official El Temür during his latter three-year reign. El Temür purged pro-Kusala officials and brought power to warlords, whose despotic rule clearly marked the decline of the dynasty.

Due to the fact that the bureaucracy was dominated by El Temür, Tugh Temür is known for his cultural contribution instead. He adopted many measures honoring Confucianism and promoting Chinese cultural values. His most concrete effort to patronize Chinese learning was founding the Academy of the Pavilion of the Star of Literature (奎章閣學士院), first established in the spring of 1329 and designed to undertake "a number of tasks relating to the transmission of Confucian high culture to the Mongolian imperial establishment" (儒教推崇). The academy was responsible for compiling and publishing a number of books, but its most important achievement was its compilation of a vast institutional compendium named Jingshi Dadian (經世大典). Tugh Temür supported Zhu Xi's Neo-Confucianism and also devoted himself in Buddhism.

==== Toghon Temür ====
After the death of Tugh Temür in 1332 and subsequent death of Rinchinbal (Emperor Ningzong) the same year, the 13-year-old Toghon Temür (Emperor Huizong), the last of the nine successors of Kublai Khan, was summoned back from exile in Koryo and succeeded to the throne. While the influential El Temür had been central to the exilment of Toghon Temür, after his return the also influential Bayan tried to use the new emperor to deepen his influence. After a coup of Bayan against El Timür and the latters death, Tugh Temür 1340 allied himself with Bayan's nephew Toqto'a, who was in discord with Bayan, and banished Bayan by coup. This was also the time in which the now adult emperor began to take an active part in the government.

Toqto'a seized the power of the court. His first administration clearly exhibited fresh new spirit. He also gave a few early signs of a new and positive direction in central government. One of his successful projects was to finish the long-stalled official histories of the Liao, Jin, and Song dynasties, which were eventually completed in 1345. Yet, Toqto'a resigned his office with the approval of Toghon Temür, marking the end of his first administration, and he was not called back until 1349.

=== Decline of the empire ===
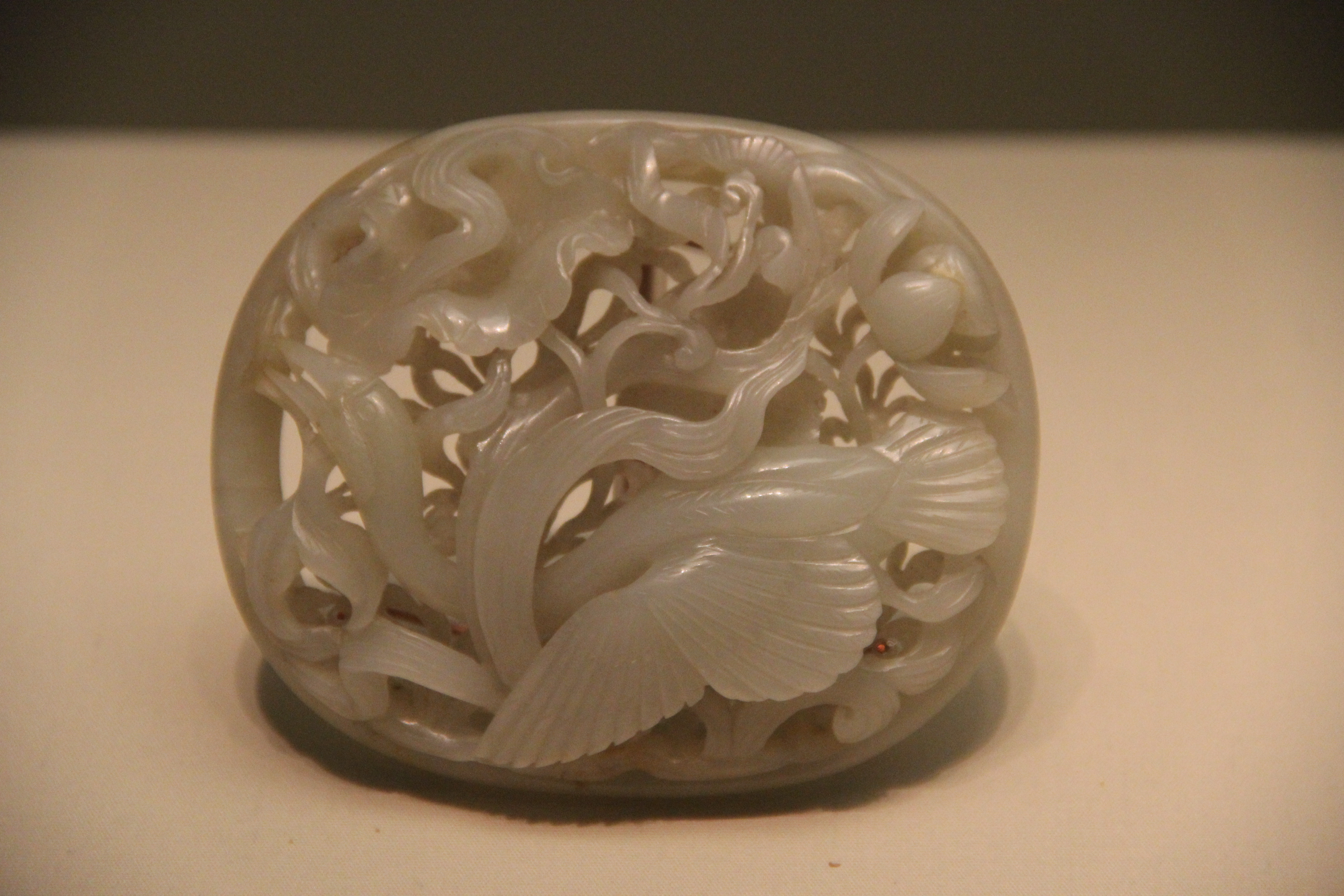
A Yuan dynasty jade swan

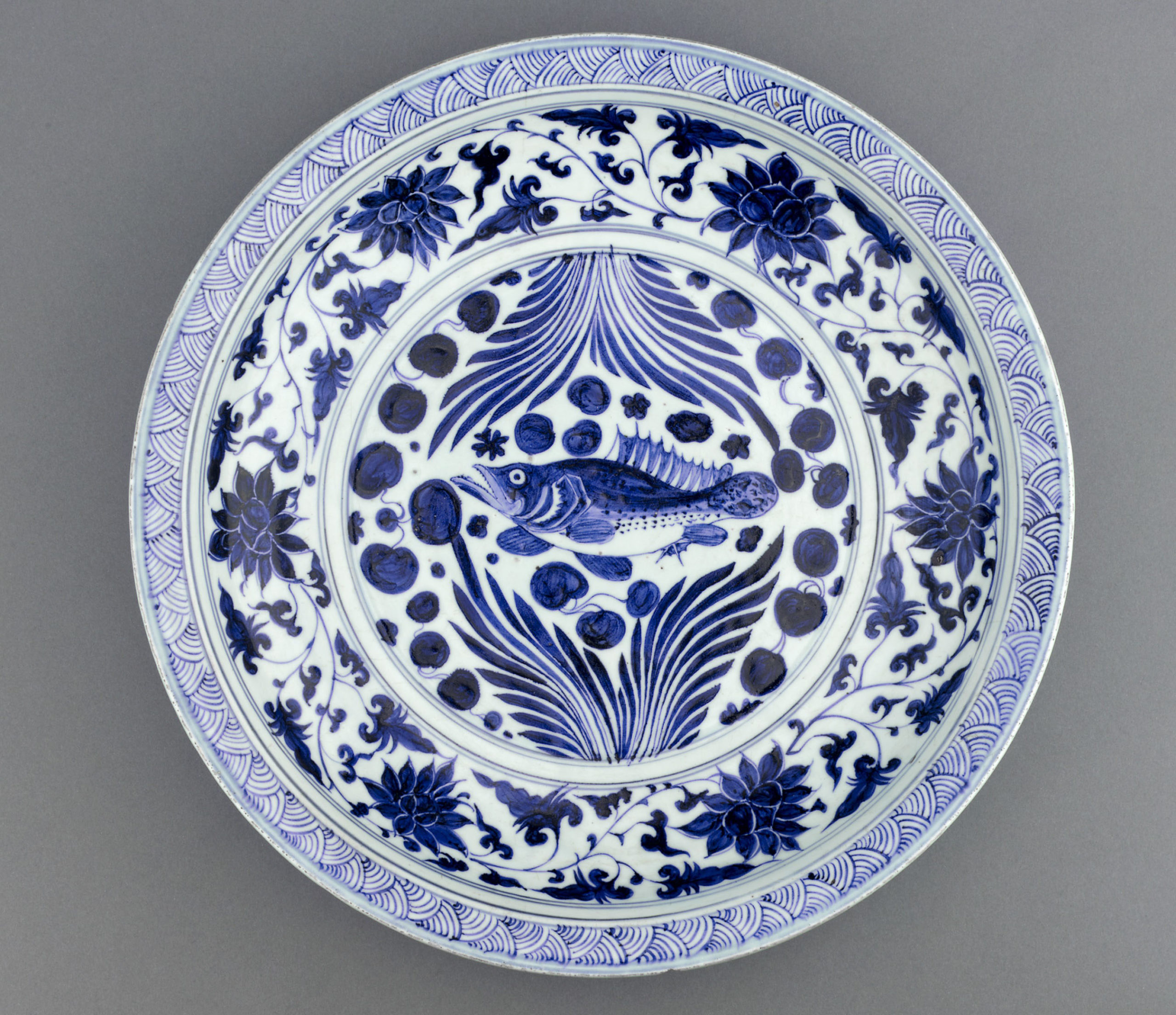
A Yuan dynasty blue-and-white porcelain dish with fish and flowing water design, mid-14th century, Freer Gallery of Art

The final years of the Yuan dynasty were marked by struggle, famine, and bitterness among the populace. In time, Kublai Khan's successors lost all influence on other Mongol lands across Asia, while the Mongols beyond the Middle Kingdom saw them as too Chinese. Gradually, they lost influence in China as well. The reigns of the later Yuan emperors were short and marked by intrigues and rivalries. Uninterested in administration, they were separated from both the army and the populace, and China was torn by dissension and unrest. Outlaws ravaged the country without interference from the weakening Yuan armies.

From the late 1340s onwards, people in the countryside suffered from frequent natural disasters such as droughts, floods and the resulting famines, and the government's lack of effective policy led to a loss of popular support. In 1351, the Red Turban Rebellion led by Song loyalists started and grew into a nationwide uprising and the Song loyalists established a renewed Song dynasty in 1351 with its capital at Kaifeng. In 1354, when Toghtogha led a large army to crush the Red Turban rebels, Toghon Temür suddenly dismissed him for fear of betrayal. This resulted in Toghon Temür's restoration of power on the one hand and a rapid weakening of the central government on the other. He had no choice but to rely on local warlords' military power, and gradually lost his interest in politics and ceased to intervene in political struggles. He fled north to Shangdu from Khanbaliq (present-day Beijing) in 1368 after the approach of the forces of the Ming dynasty (1368–1644), founded by Zhu Yuanzhang in the south. Zhu Yuanzhang was a former Duke and commander in the army of the Red Turban Song dynasty and assumed power as Emperor after the death of the Red Turban Song Emperor Han Lin'er, who had tried to regain Khanbaliq, which eventually failed, and who died in Yingchang (located in present-day Inner Mongolia) two years later (1370). Yingchang was seized by the Ming shortly after his death. Some Yuan royal family members still live in Henan today.

The Prince of Liang, Basalawarmi established a separate pocket of resistance to the Ming in Yunnan and Guizhou, but his forces were decisively defeated by the Ming in 1381. By 1387 the remaining Yuan forces in Manchuria under Naghachu had also surrendered to the Ming dynasty. The Yuan remnants retreated to Mongolia after the fall of Yingchang to the Ming in 1370, where the name Great Yuan (大元) was formally carried on, and is known as the Northern Yuan dynasty.

== Impact ==
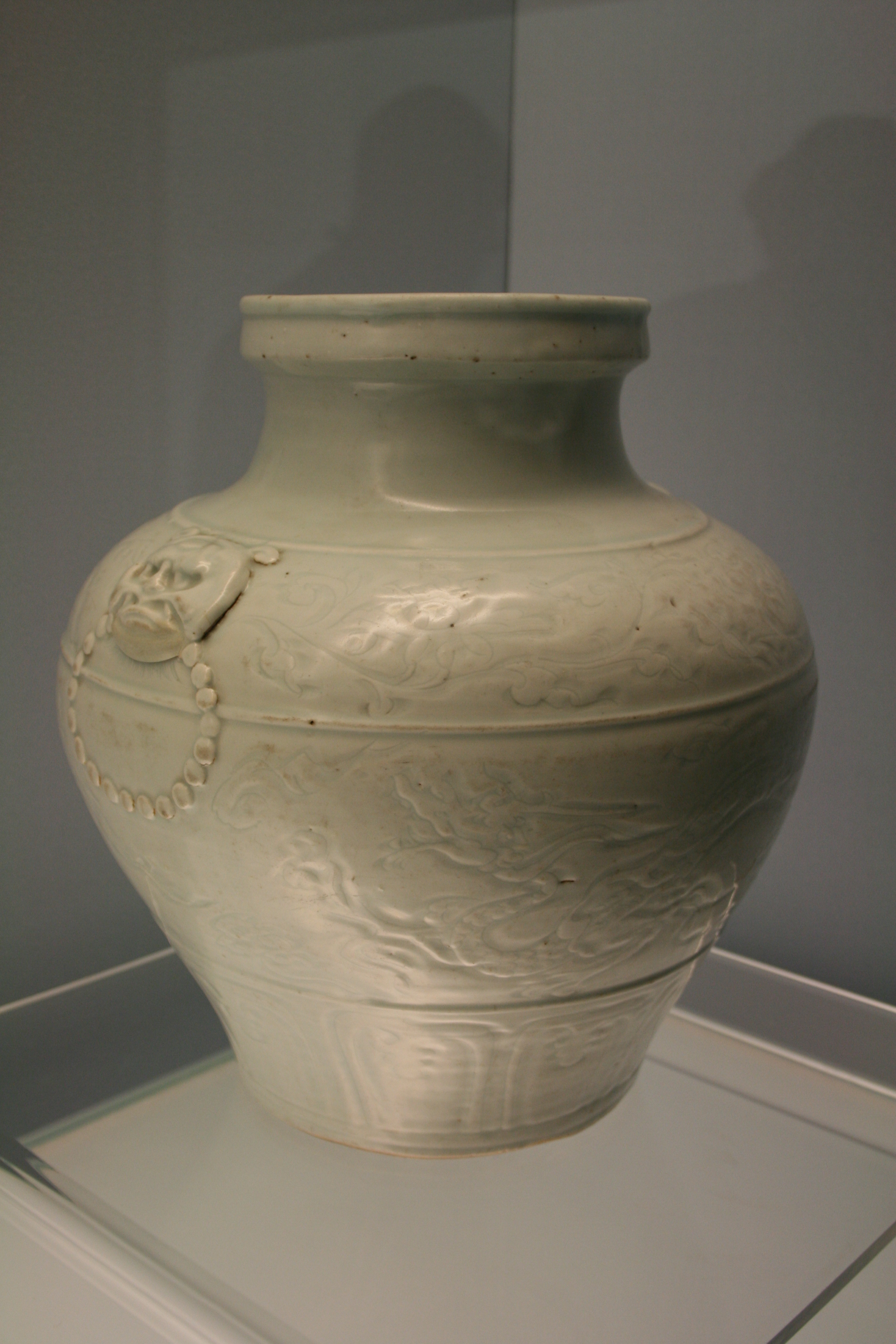
Yuan porcelain jar

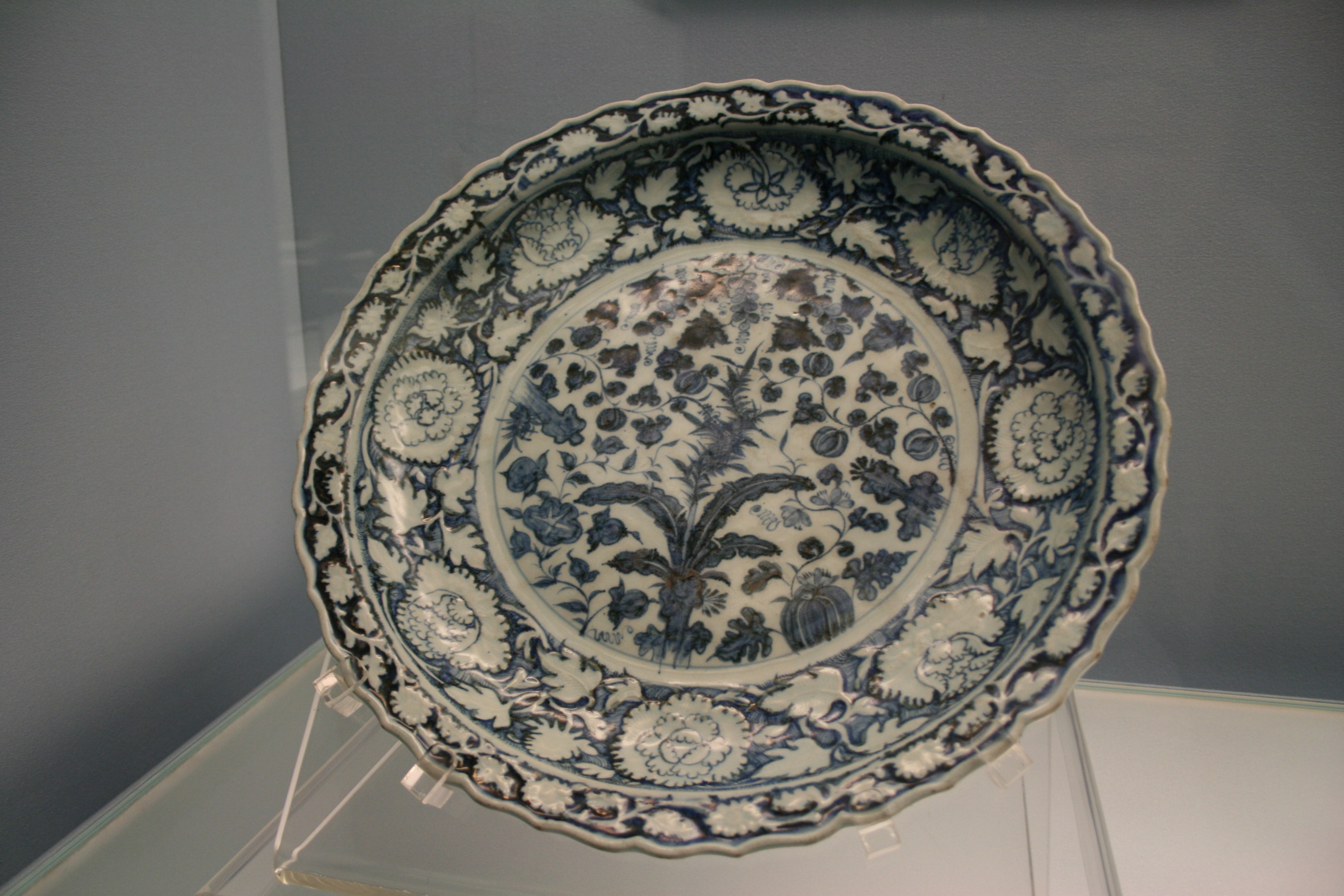
Yuan underglaze blue Jingdezhen porcelain plate

A rich cultural diversity developed during the Yuan dynasty. The major cultural achievements were the development of drama and the novel and the increased use of the written vernacular. Arts and culture also greatly developed and flourished during the Yuan dynasty. There was a widespread introduction of blue and white painted porcelain, as well as a major change to Chinese painting. The political unity of China and much of central Asia promoted trade between East and West. The Mongols' extensive West Asian and European contacts produced a fair amount of cultural exchange. The other cultures and peoples in the Mongol Empire also very much influenced China. It had significantly eased trade and commerce across Asia until its decline; the communications between Yuan dynasty and its ally and subordinate in Persia, the Ilkhanate, encouraged this development. Buddhism had a great influence in the Yuan government, and the Tibetan-rite Tantric Buddhism had significantly influenced China during this period. The Muslims of the Yuan dynasty introduced Middle Eastern cartography, astronomy, medicine, clothing, and cuisine in East Asia. Eastern crops such as carrots, turnips, new varieties of lemons, eggplants, and melons, high-quality granulated sugar, and cotton were all either introduced or successfully popularized during the Yuan dynasty.

Western musical instruments were introduced to enrich Chinese performing arts. From this period dates the conversion to Islam, by Muslims of Central Asia, of growing numbers of Chinese in the northwest and southwest. Nestorianism and Roman Catholicism also enjoyed a period of toleration. Buddhism (especially Tibetan Buddhism) flourished, although Taoism endured certain persecutions in favour of Buddhism from the Yuan government. Confucian governmental practices and examinations based on the Classics, which had fallen into disuse in north China during the period of disunity, were reinstated by the Yuan court, probably in the hope of maintaining order over Han society. Advances were realized in the fields of travel literature, cartography, geography, and scientific education.

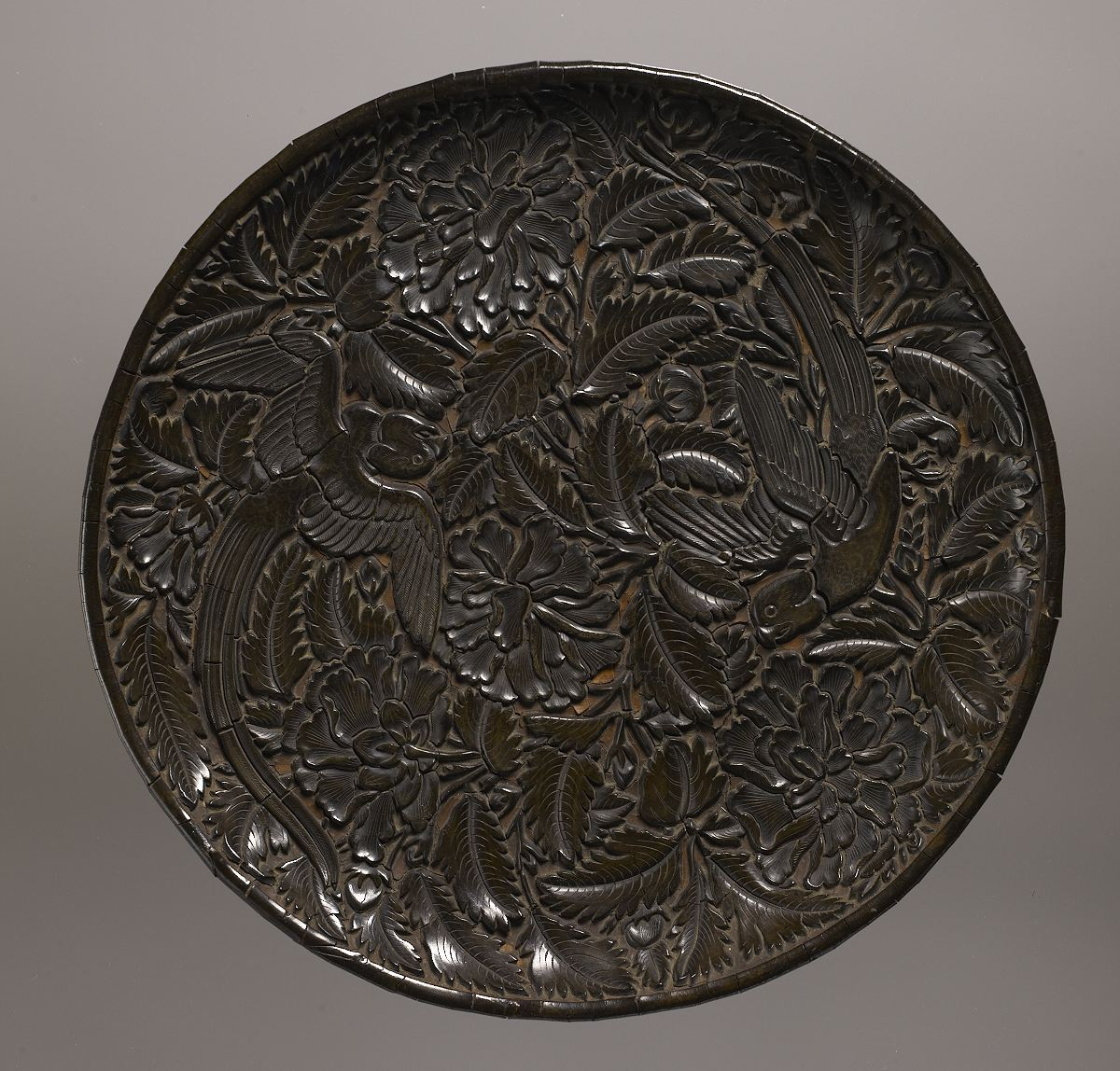
A plate made of lacquer, wood, and paper from the Yuan dynasty. The Chinese were able to perfect a method of making lacquer. Decorating this plate are parrots and peonies. The parrot was a symbol of fidelity; because of its ability to mimic human speech, it was believed to be a suitable companion to a woman whose husband was away from home. The bird would be able to inform each person of the other's activities. The peony was a symbol of female virtue. When shown in full bloom, it is a token of love, affection, and feminine beauty. Birmingham Museum of Art.

Certain Chinese innovations and products, such as purified saltpetre, printing techniques, porcelain, playing cards, and medical literature, were exported to Europe and Western Asia, while the production of thin glass and cloisonné became popular in China. The Yuan exercised a profound influence on the Chinese Ming dynasty. The Ming Emperor Zhu Yuanzhang (1368–97) admired the Mongols' unification of China and adopted its garrison system.

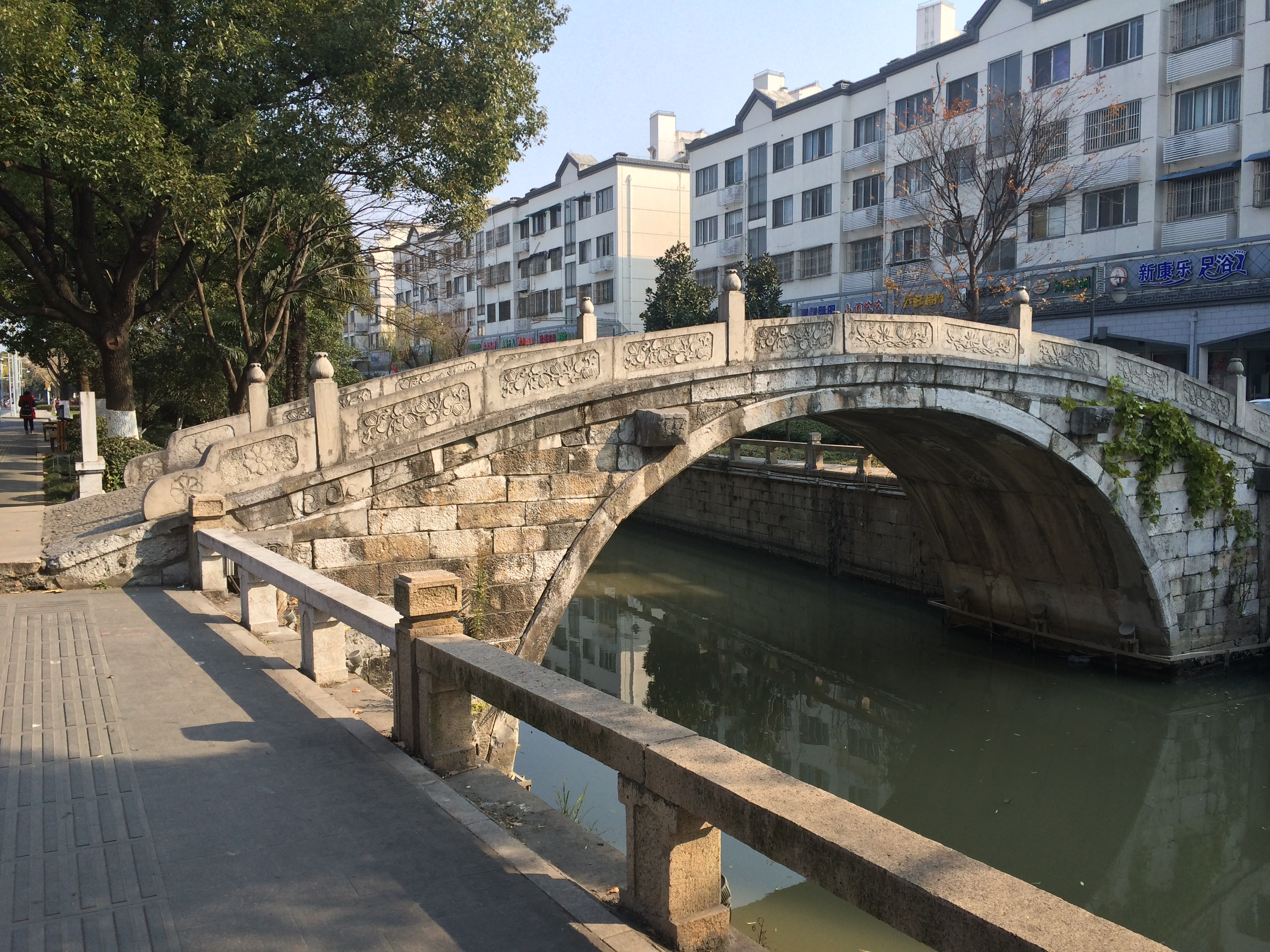
The Yuan dynasty arched bridges of Taicang were built to show the prosperity the city enjoyed under the Yuan.

Aside from the ancient Roman embassies, the first recorded travels by Europeans to China and back date from this time. The most famous traveler of the period was the Venetian Marco Polo, whose account of his trip to "Cambaluc," the capital of the Great Khan, and of life there astounded the people of Europe. The account of his travels, Il milione (or, The Million, known in English as the Travels of Marco Polo), appeared about the year 1299. Some doubted the accuracy of Marco Polo's accounts due to the lack of mentioning the Great Wall of China, chopsticks, tea houses – which would have been a prominent sight since Europeans had yet to adopt a tea culture – as well the practice of foot binding by the women in capital of the Great Khan. Recent studies however show that Polo's account is largely accurate and unique.

The Yuan undertook extensive public works. Among Kublai Khan's top engineers and scientists was the astronomer Guo Shoujing, who was tasked with many public works projects and helped the Yuan reform the lunisolar calendar to provide an accuracy of 365.2425 days of the year, which was only 26 seconds off the modern Gregorian calendar's measurement. Road and water communications were reorganized and improved. To provide against possible famines, granaries were ordered built throughout the empire. The city of Beijing was rebuilt with new palace grounds that included artificial lakes, hills and mountains, and parks. During the Yuan period, Beijing became the terminus of the Grand Canal of China, which was completely renovated. These commercially oriented improvements encouraged overland and maritime commerce throughout Asia and facilitated direct Chinese contacts with Europe. Chinese travelers to the West were able to provide assistance in such areas as hydraulic engineering. Contacts with the West also brought the introduction to China of a major food crop, sorghum, along with other foreign food products and methods of preparation.

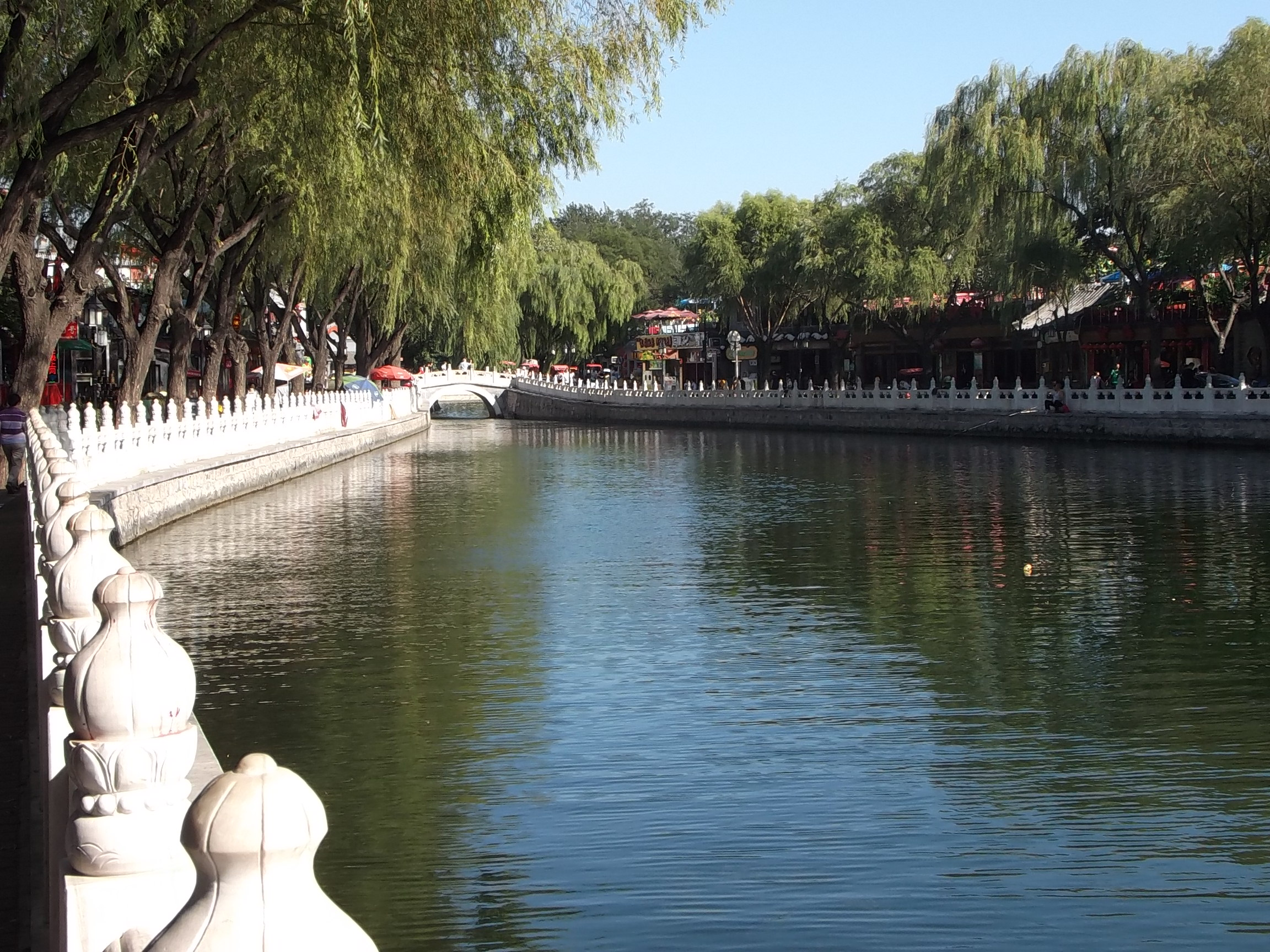
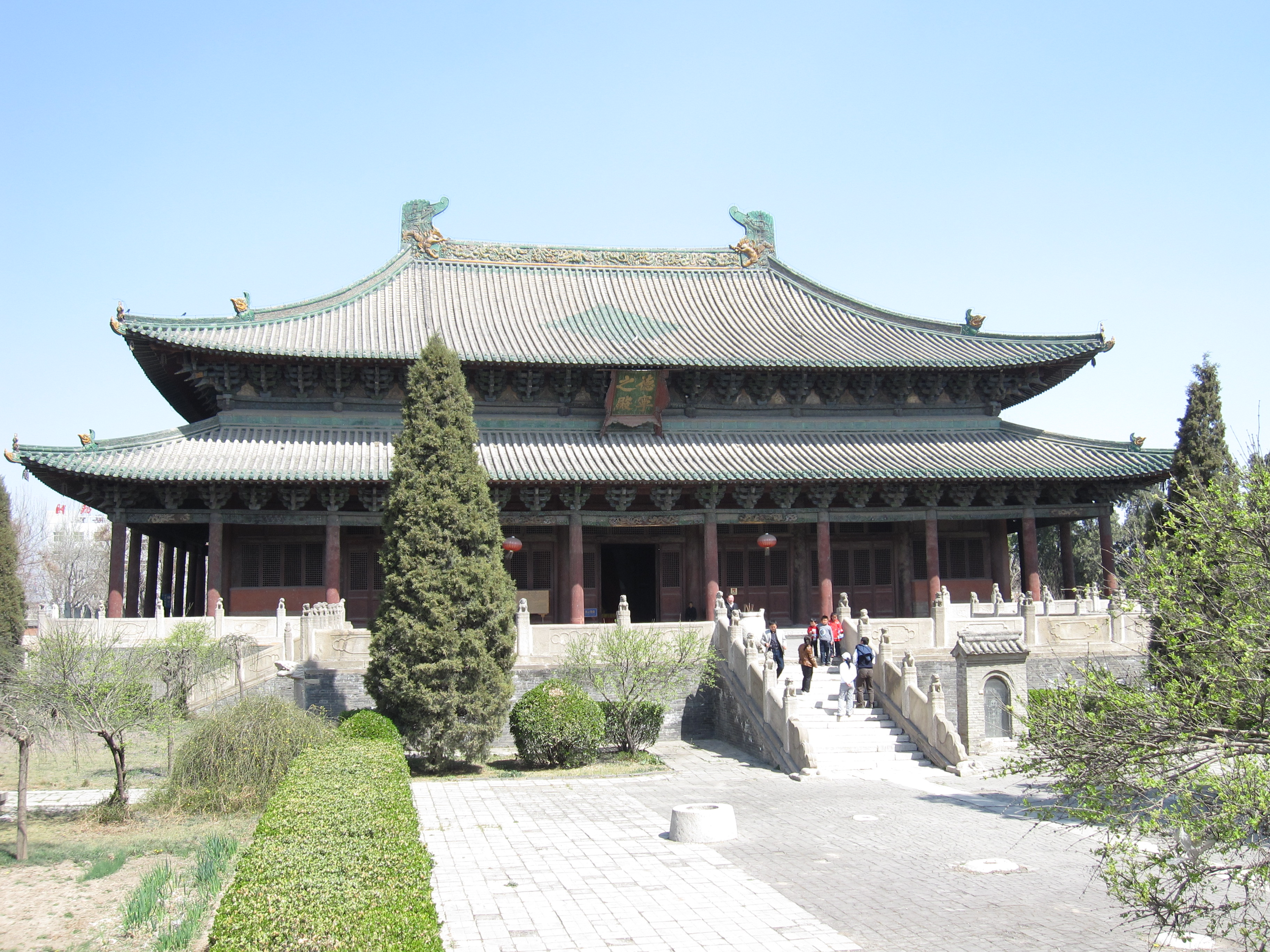
The two artificial lakes Houhai and Qianhai were built in Dadu by the Yuan. The Yuan built the Dening Hall in Quyang in 1270.

The Yuan dynasty was the first dynasty founded by non-Han ethnicity that ruled all of China proper. In the historiography of Mongolia, it is generally considered to be the continuation of the Mongol Empire. Mongols are widely known to worship the Eternal Heaven, and according to the traditional Mongolian ideology Yuan is considered to be "the beginning of an infinite number of beings, the foundation of peace and happiness, state power, the dream of many peoples, besides it there is nothing great or precious." In traditional historiography of China, on the other hand, the Yuan dynasty is usually considered to be the legitimate dynasty between the Song dynasty and the Ming dynasty. Note, however, Yuan dynasty is traditionally often extended to cover the Mongol Empire before Kublai Khan's formal establishment of the Yuan in 1271, partly because Kublai officially honoured prior rulers of the Mongol Empire as Yuan emperors by conferring them posthumous names and temple names. Despite the traditional historiography as well as the official views (including the government of the Ming dynasty which overthrew the Yuan dynasty), many Han Chinese did not consider the Yuan dynasty as a legitimate dynasty of China, but rather as a period of foreign domination. The latter believing themselves to be second-class citizens, and that China stagnated economically and scientifically.

== Government ==
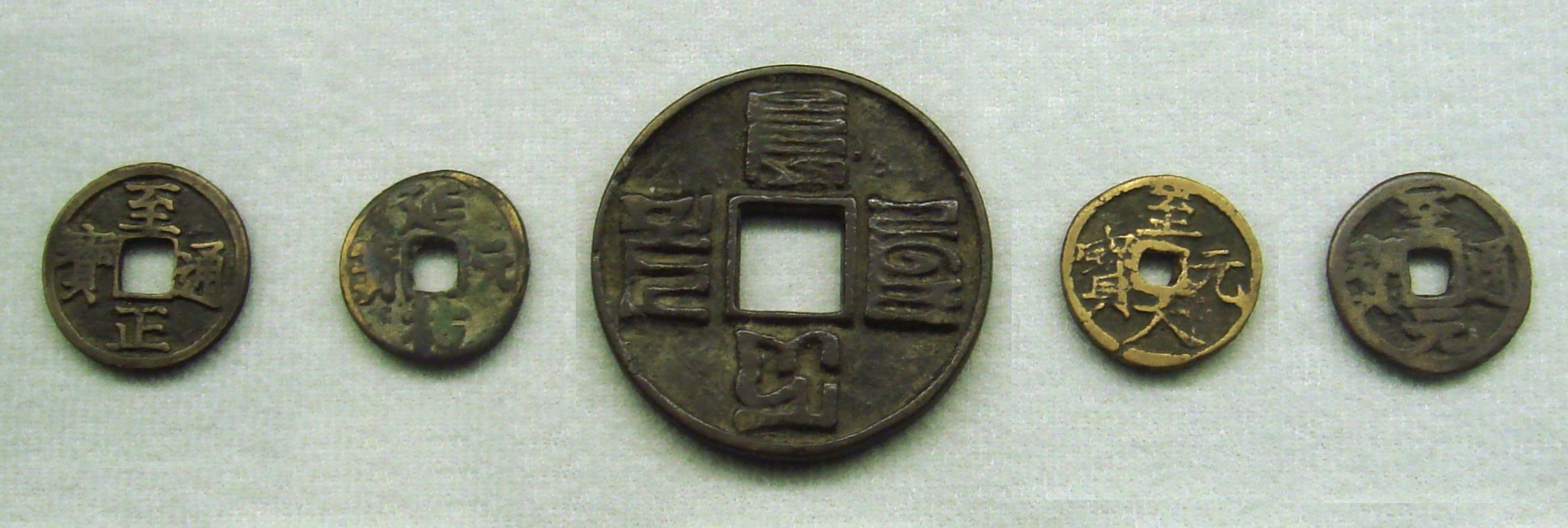
Yuan dynasty coinage

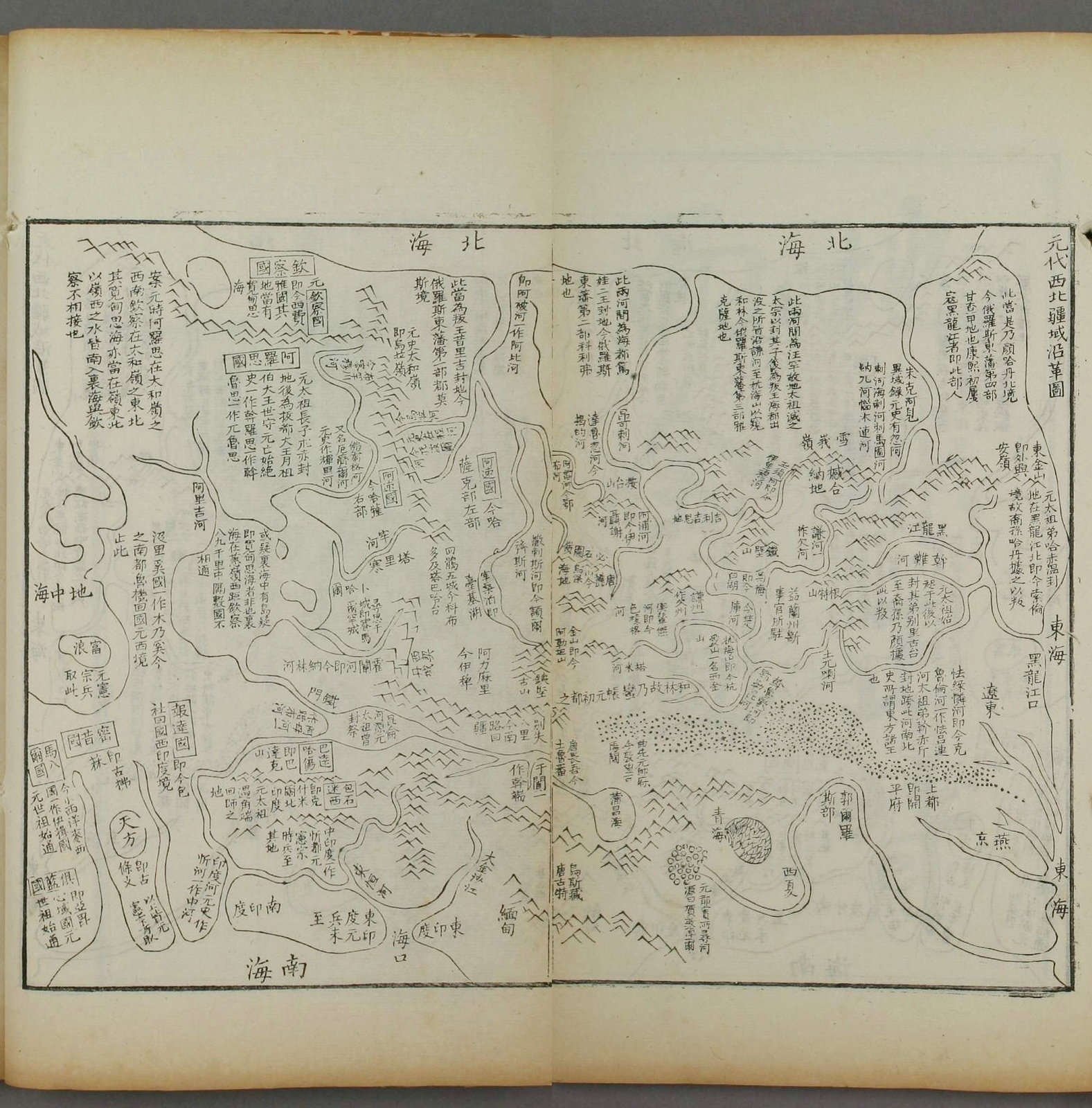
Map of the Northwest territory

=== Institutions ===
The Yuan government was centred on the emperor, huangdi in Chinese and khagan in Mongolian. Unlike ethnically Han dynasties, the Yuan court did not adhere to primogeniture and all of Kublai's descendants were eligible candidates for the throne. Election Kurultais (assemblies), during which genuine discussion on the succession would occur, were held until 1311. With the enthronement of Gegeen Khan in 1320, kurultais became a formality and real power over succession was held by empress-dowagers, guard units, or high officials.

The dynasty chose white as its imperial colour, which corresponds to the Metal element according to the theory of the Five Elements (wuxing). The Metal element does not directly follow the Song's dynastic element, Fire, in the creation sequence of the five elements. Instead, it follows the Jin dynasty's dynastic element, Earth. Although the Yuan did not openly announce it, its choice of white as its imperial colour suggests that it considered Jin, another conquest dynasty, rather than the Han Chinese Song dynasty, as its rightful predecessor.

The formal structure of the Yuan government was based on the former Jurchen Jin dynasty in northern China. The Central Secretariat (Zhongshu Sheng) was the primary organ for civil administration but it only covered northern China and Inner Mongolia. Elsewhere, branch Secretariats were established to administer the local population. The Military Affairs Bureau (Shumiyuan, also translated as Privy Council) controlled the military of northern China with the exception of the kheshig (imperial guard). The Censorate (Yushitai) oversaw official conduct. Significant portions of the Yuan government operated outside of these governing bodies. The kheshig, ordos (palace-tents), houseboys, enslaved artisants, and ortogh (government-associated merchants) were part of the imperial household and functioned outside of the regular governing institutions. The Bureau of Buddhist and Tibetan Affairs that governed Tibet and the smaller Commission for the Promotion of Religion (Chongfusi) for governing Christians were also independently run. Other autonomous organizations include the traditional education and literary institutions such as the Hanlin Academy, the Historiography Academy, and the Academy of Scholarly Worthies that supervised state education and Taoist temples.

Appointments to office were based on a stratified system of privilege according to the appointee's origins. The empire's population was divided into four descendening ranks: Mongols, Semuren ("various sorts" or western immigrants), Han (North Chinese), and Nan (southerners). In local administrations, Mongol and semuren darughachis (overseers) served alongside local Han and Southerner administrators. The two grand chancellors (chengxiang) could only be Mongols or semuren. The four managers (pingzhang) only occasionally included a Han person but no Southerners. The ortogh merchants were all semuren. Possession of weapons by Han and Southerner civilians was illegal.

=== Imperial exams ===
The Yuan government did not restart the imperial examination system until 1315. After Kublai conquered the Song dynasty in 1279, he relied on recommendations and the privilege system for appointing officials. Kublai believed that Confucian learning was not needed for government jobs and did not want to rely so heavily on Han scholars and the Chinese language.

Ayurbarwada Buyantu Khan revived the imperial exams in 1315 with some major alterations. The examinees were organised into a regional quota system based on the four class system. A quota of 300 persons was fixed for provincial examinations with 75 persons from each group. The metropolitan exam had a quota of 100 persons with 25 persons from each group. Candidates were enrolled on two lists with the Mongols and Semu-ren located on the left and the Northern and Southern Chinese on the right. Examinations were written in Chinese and based on Confucian and Neo-Confucian texts but the Mongols and Semuren received easier questions to answer than the Han. Successful candidates were awarded one of three ranks. All graduates were eligible for official appointment. Under the revised system, the yearly averages for examination degrees awarded was about 21. Despite making up the largest portion of the Yuan dynasty's population (48%), only 28 Han Chinese from the south were included among the 300 candidates. The rest of the South China slots (47) were occupied by resident Mongols or Semuren, although 47 "racial South Chinese" who were not residents of South China were approved as candidates. While the examinations operated under discriminatory policies, it still had the effect of promoting Confucianism, especially Zhu Xi's Neo-Confucianism, among the elites of the Yuan dynasty.

=== Influence on the Ilkhanate ===
The Ilkhanate employed Chinese language seals based on practices shared with the Yuan administration. Some Chinese-inscribed seals used on Ilkhanid documents were received from the Yuan court. These seals carried the name wangfu (Headquarters of His Royal Highness). Other seals employing Chinese inscriptions and Yuan-derived forms were produced within the Ilkhanate itself. The Ilkhan's Chinese imperial seal reads "Seal of Truly Mandated Emperor for Whom Heaven Indulges the Ten Thousand Things" (zhen ming huang di tian shun wan shi zhi bao; 真命皇帝天順萬事之寶). It was used by at least two Ilkhanid khans, Öljaitü and Abu Sa'id Bahadur Khan. Yasuhiro Yokkaichi interprets this material as evidence both of the continuing place of Yuan-derived imperial institutions in Ilkhanid documentary practice and of their adaptation within the Ilkhanate. The Ilkhans used the title Huangdi (Emperor) due to the influence of the Yuan dynasty's Chinese derived political system. The Ilkhanids may have also worn the dragon clothing of Imperial China.

== Science and technology ==
=== Mathematics ===
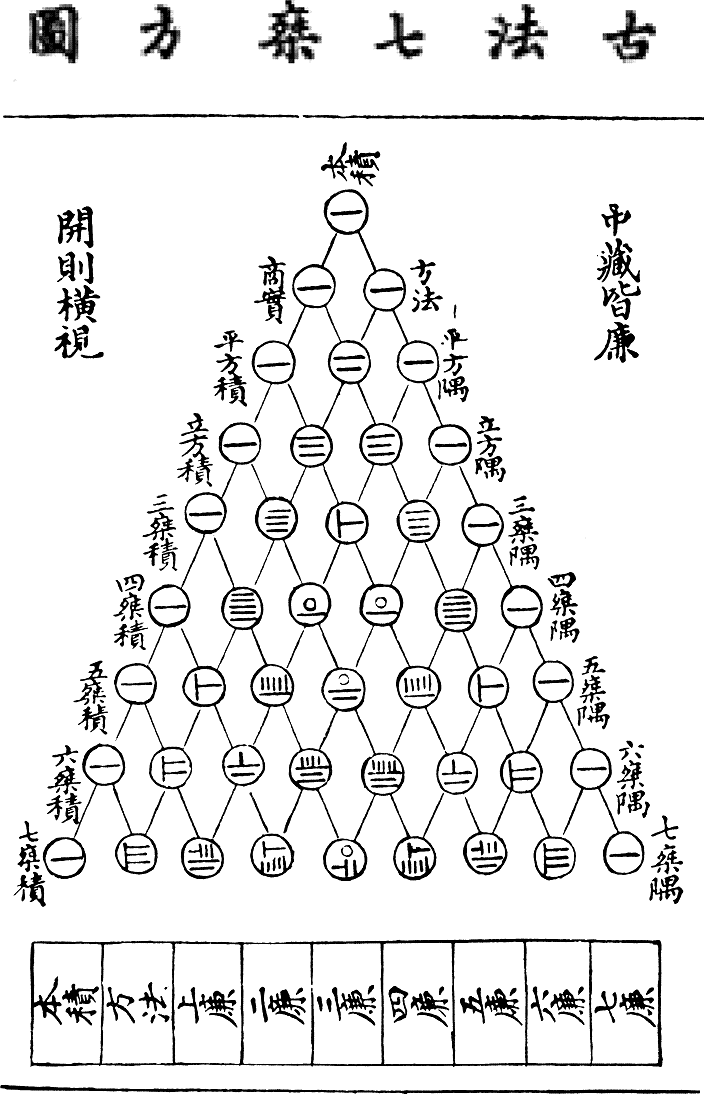
A diagram of Pascal's triangle in Zhu Shijie's Jade Mirror of the Four Unknowns, written in 1303

Yang Hui's Magic Circle

Advances in polynomial algebra were made by mathematicians during the Yuan era. The mathematician Zhu Shijie (1249–1314) solved simultaneous equations with up to four unknowns using a rectangular array of coefficients, equivalent to modern matrices. Zhu used a method of elimination to reduce the simultaneous equations to a single equation with only one unknown. His method is described in the Jade Mirror of the Four Unknowns, written in 1303. The opening pages contain a diagram of Pascal's triangle. The summation of a finite arithmetic series is also covered in the book.

Guo Shoujing applied mathematics to the construction of calendars. He was one of the first mathematicians in China to work on spherical trigonometry. Gou derived a cubic interpolation formula for his astronomical calculations. His calendar, the Shoushi Li (授時暦; ''Time Granting Calendar''), was disseminated in 1281 as the official calendar of the Yuan dynasty. The calendar may have been influenced solely by the work of Song dynasty astronomer Shen Kuo or possibly by the work of Arab astronomers. There are no explicit signs of Muslim influences in the Shoushi calendar, but Mongol rulers were known to be interested in Muslim calendars. Mathematical knowledge from the Middle East was introduced to China under the Mongols, and Muslim astronomers brought Arabic numerals to China in the 13th century.

=== Medicine ===
The physicians of the Yuan court came from diverse cultures. Healers were divided into non-Mongol physicians called otachi and traditional Mongol shamans. The Mongols characterized otachi doctors by their use of herbal remedies, which was distinguished from the spiritual cures of Mongol shamanism. Physicians received official support from the Yuan government and were given special legal privileges. Kublai created the Imperial Academy of Medicine to manage medical treatises and the education of new doctors. Confucian scholars were attracted to the medical profession because it ensured a high income and medical ethics were compatible with Confucian virtues.

The Chinese medical tradition of the Yuan had "Four Great Schools" that the Yuan inherited from the Jin dynasty. All four schools were based on the same intellectual foundation, but advocated different theoretical approaches toward medicine. Under the Mongols, the practice of Chinese medicine spread to other parts of the empire. Chinese physicians were brought along military campaigns by the Mongols as they expanded towards the west. Chinese medical techniques such as acupuncture, moxibustion, pulse diagnosis, and various herbal drugs and elixirs were transmitted westward to the Middle East and the rest of the empire. Several medical advances were made in the Yuan period. The physician Wei Yilin (1277–1347) invented a suspension method for reducing dislocated joints, which he performed using anesthetics. The Mongol physician Hu Sihui described the importance of a healthy diet in a 1330 medical treatise.

Western medicine was also practiced in China by the Nestorian Christians of the Yuan court, where it was sometimes labelled as huihui or Muslim medicine. The Nestorian physician Jesus the Interpreter founded the Office of Western Medicine in 1263 during the reign of Kublai. Huihui doctors staffed at two imperial hospitals were responsible for treating the imperial family and members of the court. Chinese physicians opposed Western medicine because its humoral system contradicted the yin-yang and wuxing philosophy underlying traditional Chinese medicine. No Chinese translation of Western medical works is known, but it is possible that the Chinese had access to Avicenna's The Canon of Medicine.

=== Printing and publishing ===
Yuan dynasty banknote with its printing plate, 1287

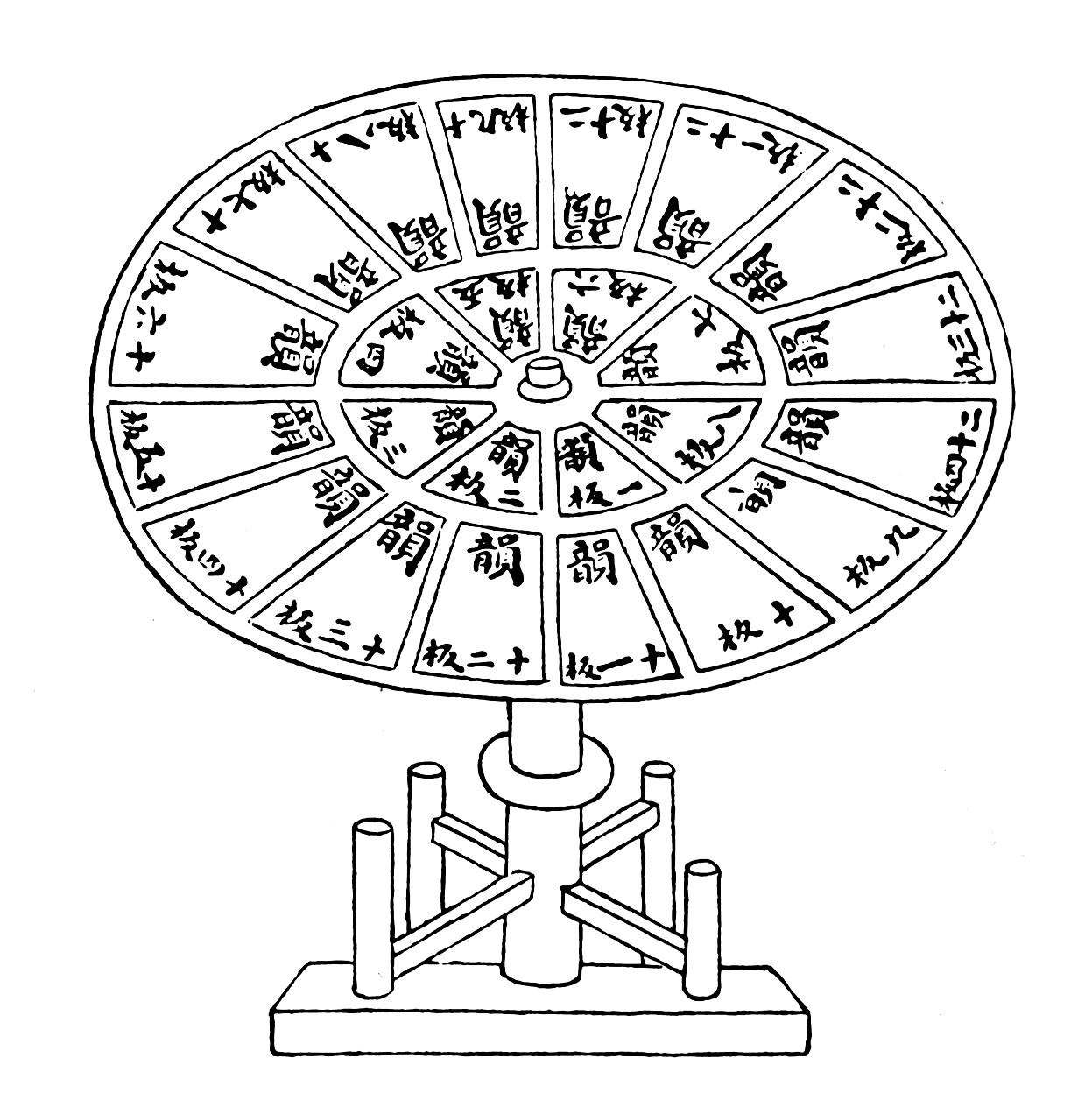
A revolving typecase with individual movable type characters from Wang Zhen's Nong Shu, published in 1313

The Mongol rulers patronized the Yuan printing industry. Chinese printing technology was transferred to the Mongols through Kingdom of Qocho and Tibetan intermediaries. Some Yuan documents such as Wang Zhen's Nong Shu were printed with earthenware movable type, a technology invented in the 12th century. However, most published works were still produced through traditional block printing techniques. The publication of a Taoist text inscribed with the name of Töregene Khatun, Ögedei's wife, is one of the first printed works sponsored by the Mongols. In 1273, the Mongols created the Imperial Library Directorate, a government-sponsored printing office. The Yuan government established centres for printing throughout China. Local schools and government agencies were funded to support the publishing of books.

Private printing businesses also flourished under the Yuan. They published a diverse range of works, and printed educational, literary, medical, religious, and historical texts. The volume of printed materials was vast. In 1312, 1,000 copies of a Buddhist text commented by Cosgi Odsir were printed just within Beijing. By 1328, annual sales of printed calendars and almanacs reached over three million in the Yuan dynasty.

One of the more notable applications of printing technology was the Jiaochao, the paper money of the Yuan. Jiaochao were made from the bark of mulberry trees. The Yuan government used woodblocks to print paper money, but switched to bronze plates in 1275. The Mongols experimented with establishing the Chinese-style paper monetary system in Mongol-controlled territories outside of China. The Yuan minister Bolad was sent to Iran, where he explained Yuan paper money to the Il-khanate court of Gaykhatu. The Il-khanate government issued paper money in 1294, but public distrust of the exotic new currency doomed the experiment.

Foreign observers took note of Yuan printing technology. Marco Polo documented the Yuan printing of paper money and almanac pamphlets called tacuini. The vizier Rashid-al-Din recognized that printing was a valuable technological breakthrough, and expressed regret that the Mongol experiment with printing paper money had failed in the Muslim world. Rashid-al-Din's view was not shared by other chroniclers in the Middle East, who were critical of the experiment's disruptive impact on the Il-khanate.

=== Ceramics ===
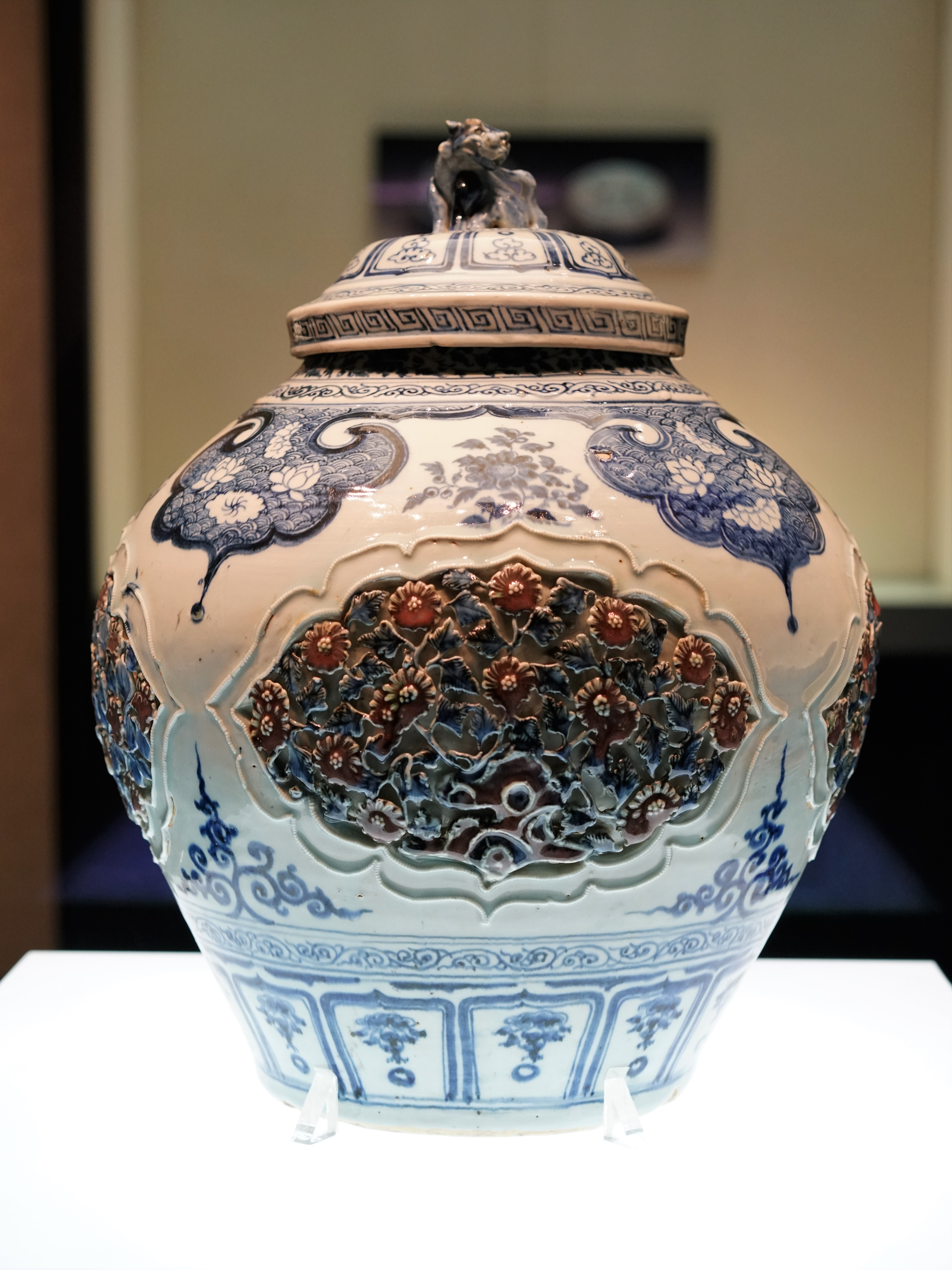
Blue-and-white Covered Jar with Fretwork Floral Design in Red and Blue Glaze, excavated in Baoding

In Chinese ceramics the period was one of expansion, with the great innovation the development in Jingdezhen ware of underglaze painted blue and white pottery. This seems to have begun in the early decades of the 14th century, and by the end of the dynasty was mature and well-established. Other major types of wares continued without a sharp break in their development, but there was a general trend to some larger size pieces, and more decoration. This is often seen as a decline from Song refinement. Exports expanded considerably, especially to the Islamic world.

== Society ==
=== Imperial lifestyle ===
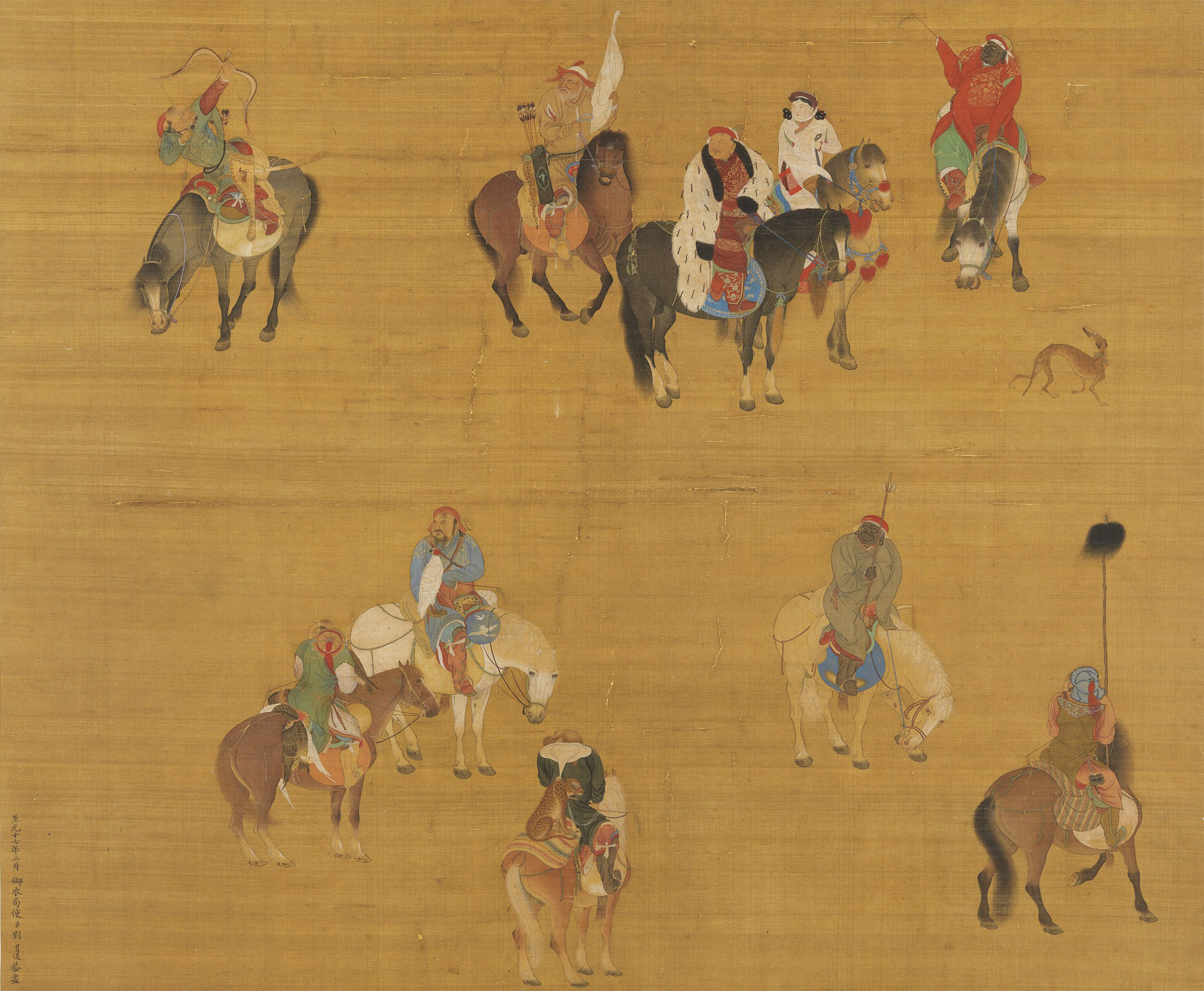
Painting of Kublai Khan on a hunting expedition, by Chinese court artist Liu Guandao, c. 1280

Since its invention in 1269, the 'Phags-pa script, a unified script for spelling Mongolian, Tibetan, and Chinese languages, was preserved in the court until the end of the dynasty. Most of the Emperors could not master written Chinese, but they could generally converse well in the language. The Mongol custom of long standing quda marriage alliance with other Mongol clans – the Onggirat and the Ikeres – kept the imperial blood purely Mongol until the reign of Tugh Temur (Emperor Wenzong), whose mother was a Tangut concubine. The Yuan rulers did not want to create potential rivals by repeatedly marrying within a particular family or clan, so they took multiple wives from different backgrounds and mostly from less powerful families. The Mongol Emperors had built large palaces and pavilions, but some still continued to live as nomads at times. Tugh Temür was an example of a Yuan emperor who actively sponsored cultural activities; including in his imperial capacity and in his personal activities such as writing poetry, painting, reading Chinese classical texts, and ordering the compilation of books.

The average Mongol garrison family of the Yuan dynasty seems to have lived a life of decaying rural leisure, with income from the harvests of their Chinese tenants eaten up by costs of equipping and dispatching men for their tours of duty. The Mongols practiced debt slavery, and by 1290 in all parts of the Mongol Empire commoners were selling their children into slavery. Seeing this as damaging to the Mongol nation, Kublai in 1291 forbade the sale abroad of Mongols. Kublai wished to persuade the Chinese that he was becoming increasingly sinicized while maintaining his Mongolian credentials with his own people. He set up a civilian administration to rule, built a capital within China, supported Chinese religions and culture, and devised suitable economic and political institutions for the court. But at the same time he never abandoned his Mongolian heritage.

During the Yuan Dynasty, homosexuality had been both a common cultural practice and a highly suppressed behaviour. The Great Yassa, one of the Yuan Dynasty law systems, prohibited homosexuality, but many cultural accounts recorded the ubiquity of homosexual practices across Mongolians’ daily lives.

=== Religion ===
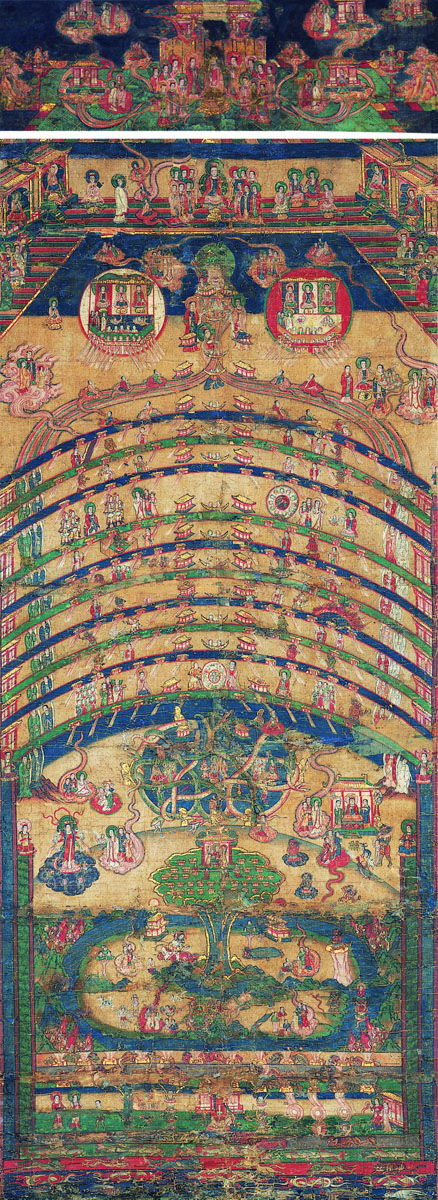
Manichaean Diagram of the Universe, a painting describing Yuan period Manichaean cosmology

There were many religions practiced during the Yuan dynasty, such as Buddhism, Islam, Christianity and Manichaeism. The establishment of the Yuan dynasty had dramatically increased the number of Muslims in China. However, unlike the western khanates, the Yuan dynasty never converted to Islam. Instead, Kublai Khan, the founder of the Yuan dynasty, favored Buddhism, especially the Tibetan variants. As a result, Tibetan Buddhism became the de facto state religion. The top-level department and government agency known as the Bureau of Buddhist and Tibetan Affairs (Chinese: 宣政院; pinyin: xuānzhèngyuàn) was set up in Khanbaliq (modern Beijing) to supervise Buddhist monks throughout the empire. Since Kublai Khan only esteemed the Sakya sect of Tibetan Buddhism, other religions became less important. He and his successors kept a Sakya Imperial Preceptor (Chinese: 帝师; pinyin: Dìshī) at court. Before the end of the Yuan dynasty, 14 leaders of the Sakya sect had held the post of Imperial Preceptor, thereby enjoying special power. Furthermore, Mongol patronage of Buddhism resulted in a number of monuments of Buddhist art. Mongolian Buddhist translations, almost all from Tibetan originals, began on a large scale after 1300. Many Mongols of the upper class such as the Jalayir and the Oronar nobles as well as the emperors also patronized Confucian scholars and institutions. A considerable number of Confucian and Chinese historical works were translated into the Mongolian language.

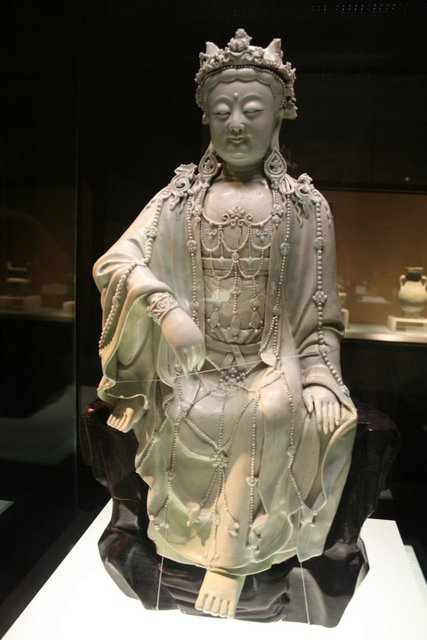
A Yuan Qingbai porcelain statue of Guanyin, a bodhisattva of Mahayana Buddhism

At the same time the Mongols imported Central Asian Muslims to serve as administrators in China, the Mongols also sent Hans and Khitans from China to serve as administrators over the Muslim population in Bukhara in Central Asia, using foreigners to curtail the power of the local peoples of both lands.

Genghis Khan and the following Yuan emperors forbade Islamic practices like Halal butchering, forcing Mongol methods of butchering animals on Muslims, and other restrictive degrees continued. Muslims had to slaughter sheep in secret. Genghis Khan directly called Muslims and Jews "slaves" and demanded that they follow the Mongol method of eating rather than the halal method. Circumcision was also forbidden. Jews were also affected and forbidden by the Mongols to eat Kosher.

Among all the [subject] alien peoples only the Hui-hui say "we do not eat Mongol food". [Cinggis Qa’an replied:] "By the aid of heaven we have pacified you; you are our slaves. Yet you do not eat our food or drink. How can this be right?" He thereupon made them eat. "If you slaughter sheep, you will be considered guilty of a crime." He issued a regulation to that effect ... [In 1279/1280 under Qubilai] all the Muslims say: "if someone else slaughters [the animal] we do not eat". Because the poor people are upset by this, from now on, Musuluman [Muslim] Huihui and Zhuhu [Jewish] Huihui, no matter who kills [the animal] will eat [it] and must cease slaughtering sheep themselves, and cease the rite of circumcision.

The Muslims in the semu class revolted against the Yuan dynasty in the Ispah Rebellion, but the rebellion was crushed and the Muslims were massacred by the Yuan loyalist commander Chen Youding. Some Muslim communities had the name in Chinese meaning "barracks" and also meaning "thanks"; many Hui Muslims claim it is because that they played an important role in overthrowing the Mongols and it was named in thanks by the Han Chinese for assisting them.

During the Ming conquest of Yunnan, Muslim generals Mu Ying and Lan Yu led Muslim troops loyal to the Ming dynasty against Mongol and Muslim troops loyal to the Yuan dynasty.

Hindu statues were found in Quanzhou dating to the Yuan period.

=== Four-class system ===
==== Structure ====
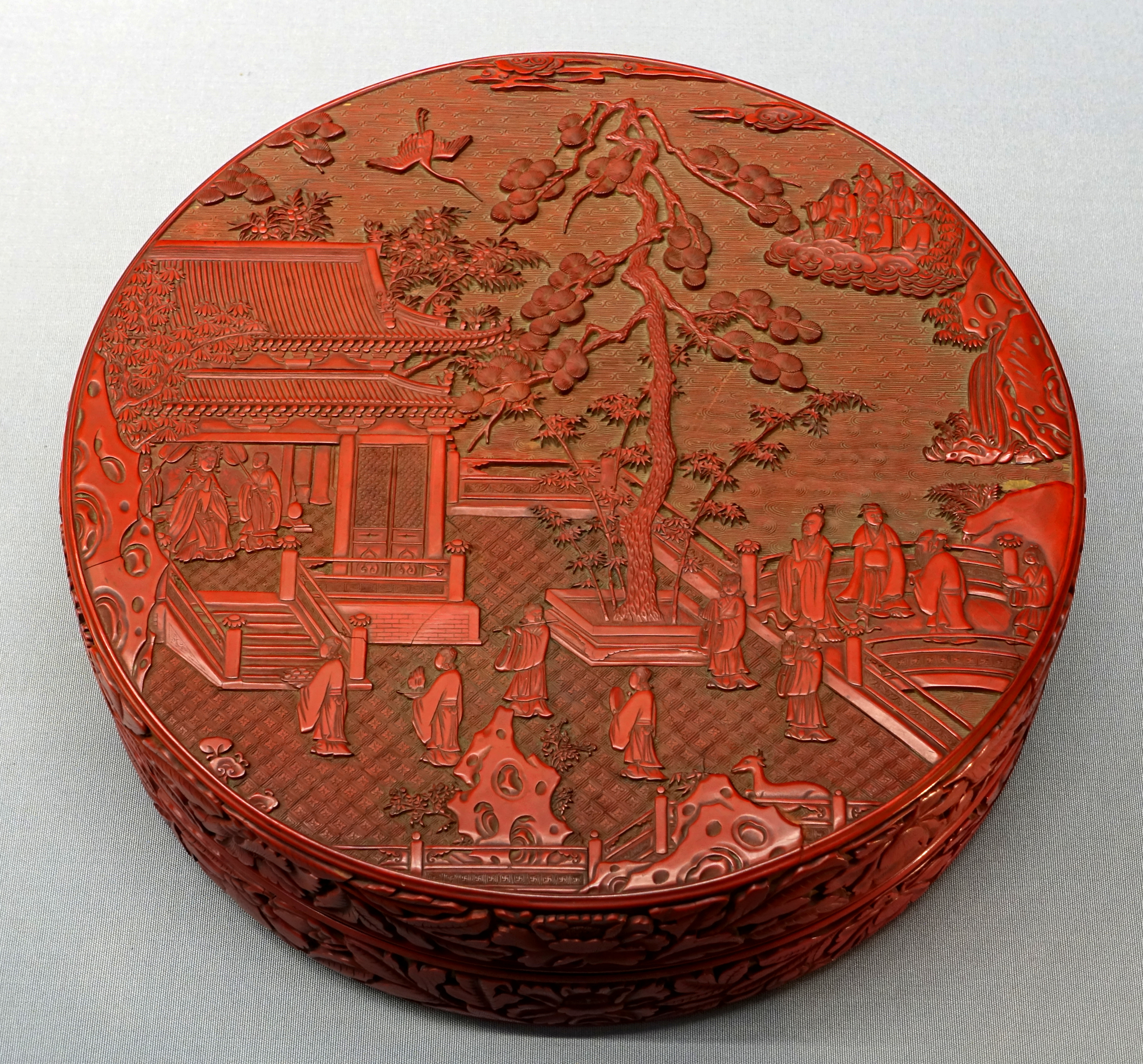
Box with pavilion and figures, Yuan dynasty.

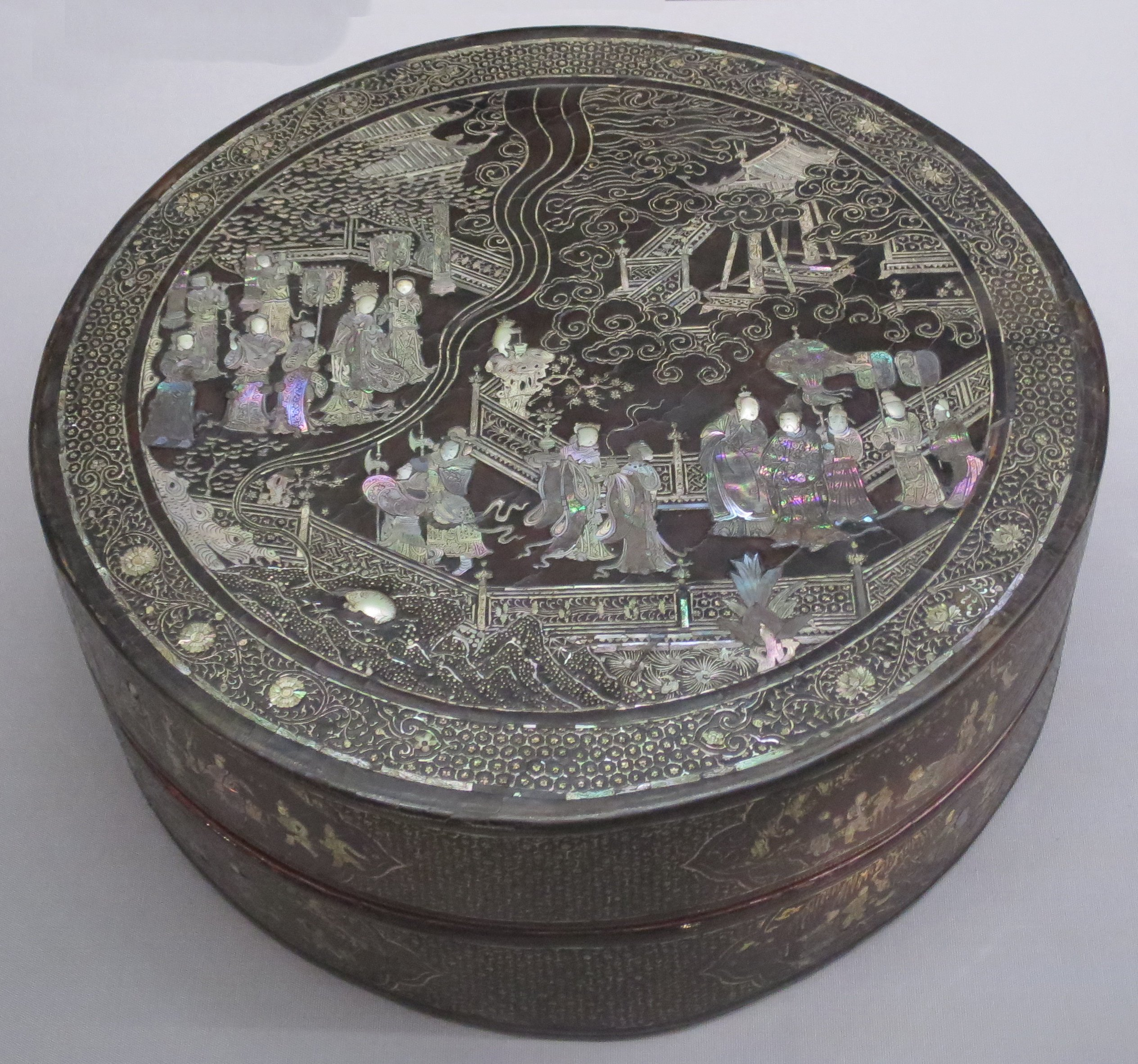
Covered box with lunar palace, 14th century. Yuan dynasty.

The Mongols had employed foreigners long before the reign of Kublai Khan, the founder of the Yuan dynasty. But during Kublai's reign a hierarchy of reliability was introduced in China. The population was divided into the following classes:

1. Mongols. The Mongols were called "Gao-chen" (the citizens of the ruling empire) by the conquered Southern Song population.
2. Semu, consisting of non-Mongol foreigners from the west and Central Asia, like Buddhist Uyghurs from Turfan, Tanguts, Tibetans, Jews, Nestorian Christians, and Muslims from Central Asia.
3. Han, a category usually referring to Han Chinese people, but under Yuan usage referred to various peoples, most of whom were former subjects of the Jurchen Jin dynasty such as Han Chinese in Northern China, Jurchens, Khitans, but also Koreans and other ethnicities who lived north of the Huaihe River
4. Nan (Southerners), or all subjects of the former Southern Song dynasty, including ethnic Han Chinese and minority native ethnic groups in southern China, as well as the people of the Dali Kingdom. They were sometimes called "Manzi" during the Yuan dynasty. They were on the "bottom of the privilege ladder" in Yuan society.

The ordering of the classes and the placement of people in them came down to how loyal and trustworthy to the Mongols they were. This was defined by the date they surrendered to the Mongols and had little to do with their ethnicity. Ethnic Han Chinese could be classified as either Han ren or Nan ren while Khitans and Jurchens from Qara Khitai were not considered Han but Semu. The earlier they surrendered to the Mongols, the higher they were placed, while the more they held out, the lower they were ranked. As a result, the Northern Chinese were ranked higher than the Southern Chinese, because the Song dynasty in southern China fought longer and surrendered later. Similarly, the Uighur and Karluk monarchs were ranked higher than the Korean monarch at court because they surrendered earlier while the Koreans surrendered later. The Uighurs in particular were noted to not have fought at all.

==== Foreign administrators ====
The Mongols employed people from different regions to oversee different parts of their empire. Central Asian Muslims served as administrators in China while Han people and Khitans from China served as administrators over the Muslim population in Bukhara in Central Asia. Foreigners were used to curtail the power of the local peoples of both lands. Han people were moved to Central Asian areas like Besh Baliq, Almaliq, and Samarqand by the Mongols where they worked as artisans and farmers. Alans were recruited into the Mongol forces with one unit called "Right Alan Guard" which was combined with "recently surrendered" soldiers, Mongols, and Chinese soldiers stationed in the area of the former Kingdom of Qocho and in Besh Balikh the Mongols established a Chinese military colony led by Chinese general Qi Gongzhi. After the Mongol conquest of Central Asia by Genghis Khan, foreigners were chosen as administrators of gardens and fields in Samarqand while co-management with Chinese and Khitans was required since Muslims were not allowed to manage without them. The Yuan-appointed Governor of Samarqand was a Khitan by the name of Ahai. He was from the Qara Khitai, held the title Taishi, and was familiar with Chinese culture. Han officials and colonists were sent by the Yuan dynasty to areas of Lingbei province including Henning Circuit, Yilan Prefecture, and Qian Prefecture.

==== Anti-Chinese policies ====
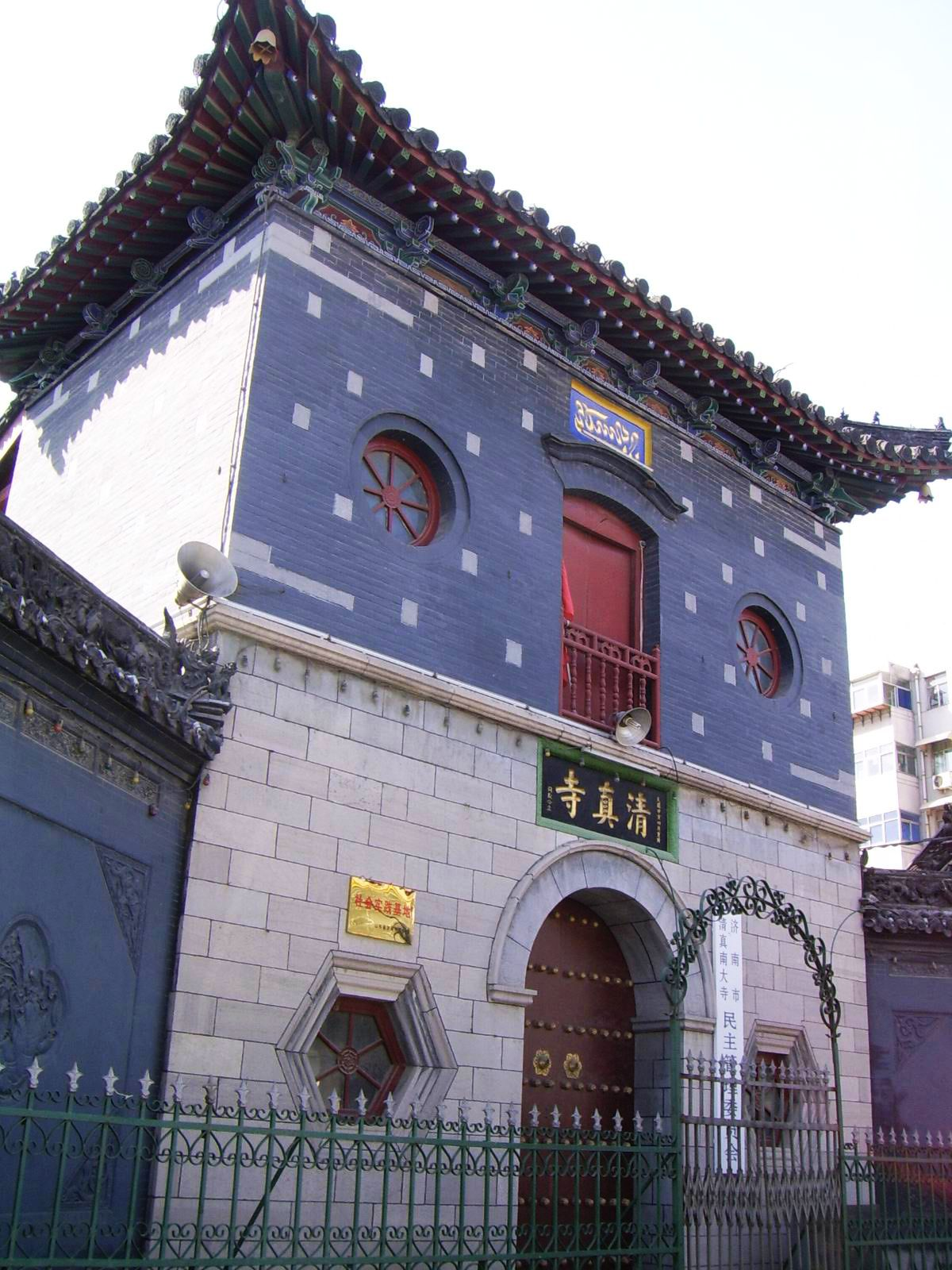
Jinan Great Southern Mosque was completed during the reign of Temür Khan (the Emperor Chengzong of Yuan).

Politically, the system of government created by Kublai Khan was the product of a compromise between Mongolian patrimonial feudalism and the traditional Chinese autocratic-bureaucratic system. Nevertheless, socially the educated Chinese elite were in general not given the degree of esteem that they had been accorded previously under native Chinese dynasties. Although the traditional Chinese elite were not given their share of power, the Mongols and the Semu people (various allied groups from Central Asia and the western end of the empire) largely remained strangers to the mainstream Chinese culture, and this dichotomy gave the Yuan regime a somewhat strong "colonial" coloration. The unequal treatment is possibly due to the fear of transferring power to the ethnic Chinese under their rule. The Mongols and Semu were given certain advantages in the dynasty, and this would last even after the restoration of the imperial examination in the early 14th century. In general there were very few North Chinese or Southerners reaching the highest-post in the government compared with the possibility that Persians did so in the Ilkhanate. Later the Yongle Emperor of the Ming dynasty also mentioned the discrimination that existed during the Yuan dynasty. In response to an objection against the use of "barbarians" in his government, the Yongle Emperor answered: "Discrimination was used by the Mongols during the Yuan dynasty, who employed only "Mongols and Tartars" and discarded northern and southern Chinese and this was precisely the cause that brought disaster upon them." However, ordinary Mongol families fell into extreme poverty in both Mongolia and China proper, and elite positions were increasingly penetrated by ethnic Han.

==== Anti-Semu policies ====
Despite the high position given to Muslims, some policies of the Yuan emperors severely discriminated against them, restricting Halal slaughter and other Islamic practices like circumcision, as well as Kosher butchering for Jews, forcing them to eat food the Mongol way. Toward the end, corruption and the persecution became so severe that Muslim generals joined Han in rebelling against the Mongols. The Ming founder Zhu Yuanzhang had Muslim generals like Lan Yu who rebelled against the Mongols and defeated them in combat. Some Muslim communities had a Chinese surname Yíng (營) which means, amongst other definitions, both "barracks" and "thanks". Many Hui Muslims claim that because they played an important role in overthrowing the Mongols, this surname was given in thanks by the Han Chinese for assisting them. During the war fighting the Mongols, among the Ming Emperor Zhu Yuanzhang's armies was the Hui Muslim Feng Sheng. The Muslims in the Semu class also revolted against the Yuan dynasty in the Ispah Rebellion but the rebellion was crushed and the Muslims were massacred by the Yuan loyalist commander Chen Youding.

The Muslim merchants in Quanzhou who engaged in maritime trade enriched their families which encompassed their political and trade activities as families. Historians see the violent Chinese backlash that happened at the end of the Yuan dynasty against the wealth of the Muslim and Semu as something inevitable, however anti-Muslim and anti-Semu laws had already been passed by the Yuan dynasty. In 1340 all marriages were forced to follow Confucian principles in marriage regulations, in 1329 all foreign holy men including Muslims had tax exemptions revoked, in 1328 the position of Muslim Qadi was abolished after its powers were limited in 1311. This resulted in anti-Mongol sentiment among Muslims so some anti-Yuan rebels in the mid 14th century were joined by Muslims. In 1357–1367 the Yisibaxi Muslim Persian garrison started a revolt against the Yuan dynasty in Quanzhou and southern Fujian. Persian merchants Amin ud-Din (Amiliding) and Saif ud-Din Saifuding led the revolt. Persian official Yawuna assassinated both Amin ud-Din and Saif ud-Din in 1362 and took control of the Muslim rebel forces. For five years the Muslim rebels tried to strike north and took over some parts of Xinghua but were defeated at Fuzhou two times and failed to take it. Yuan provincial loyalist forces from Fuzhou defeated the Muslim rebels in 1367 after A Muslim rebel officer named Jin Ji defected from Yawuna.

==== Criticism ====
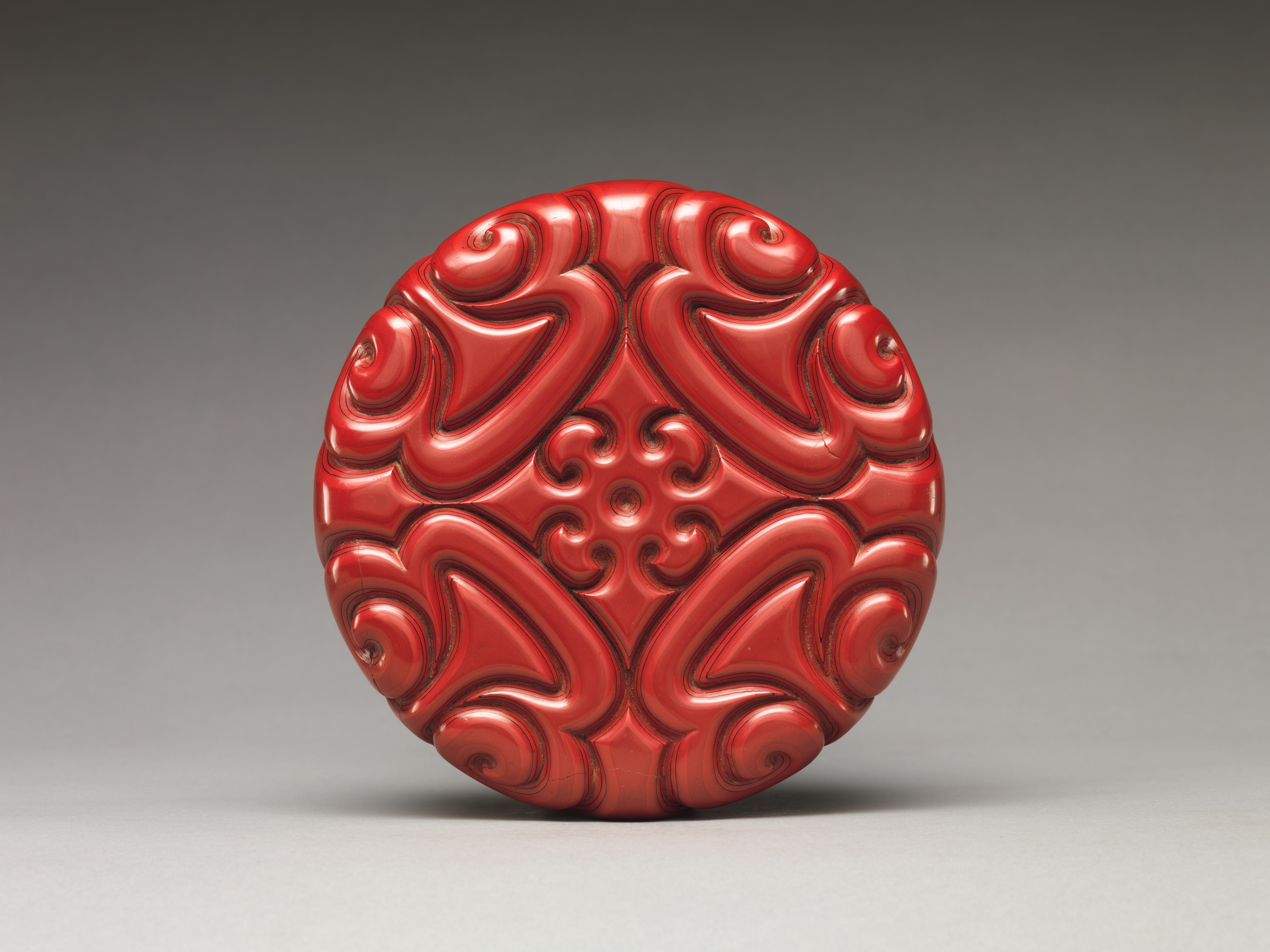
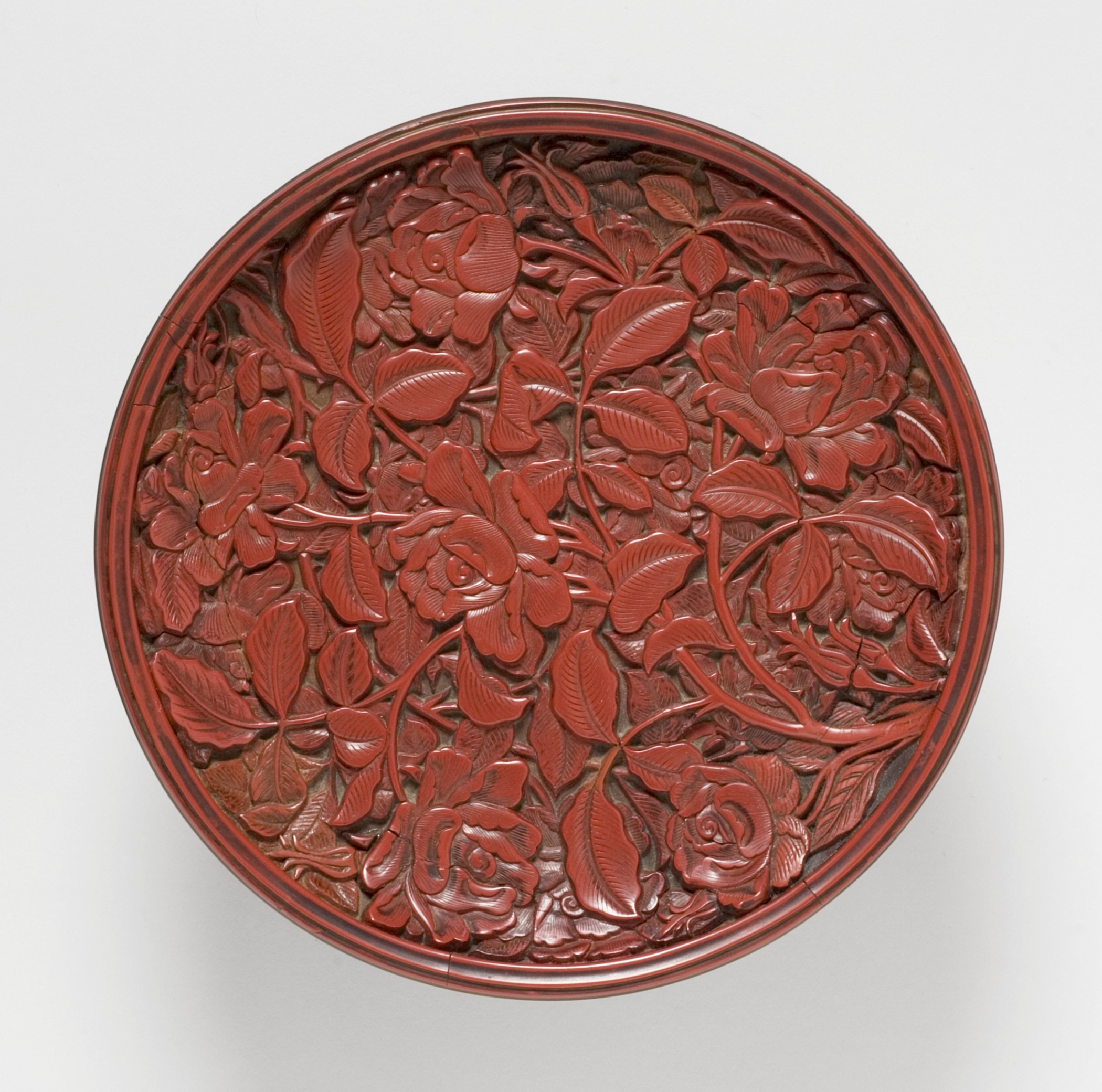
Yuan dynasty carved red lacquer.

The historian Frederick W. Mote wrote that the usage of the term "social classes" for this system was misleading and that the position of people within the four-class system was not an indication of their actual social power and wealth, but just entailed "degrees of privilege" to which they were entitled institutionally and legally, so a person's standing within the classes was not a guarantee of their standing, since there were rich and well socially standing Chinese while there were less rich Mongol and Semu than there were Mongol and Semu who lived in poverty and were ill-treated.

Japanese historians like Uematsu, Sugiyama and Morita criticized the perception that a four-class system existed under Mongol rule and Funada Yoshiyuki questioned the very existence of the Semu as a class.

== Administrative divisions ==
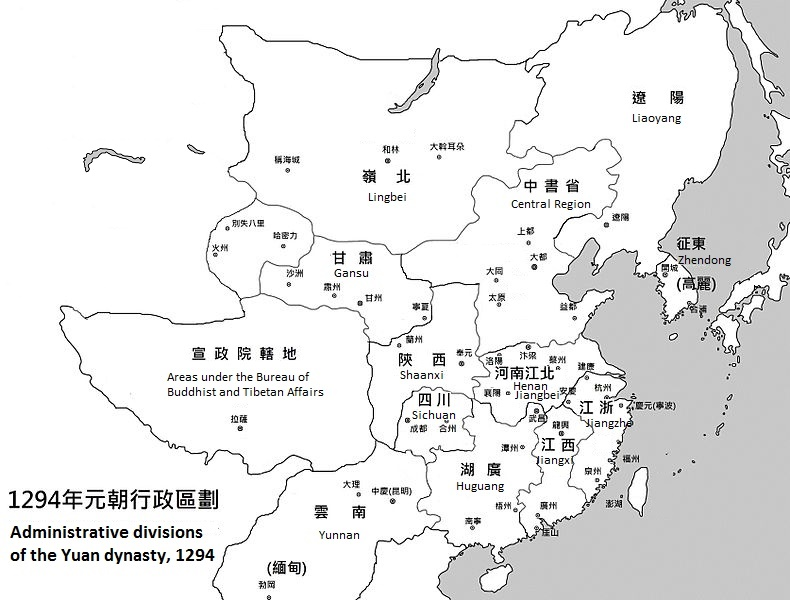
Administrative divisions of the Yuan dynasty.

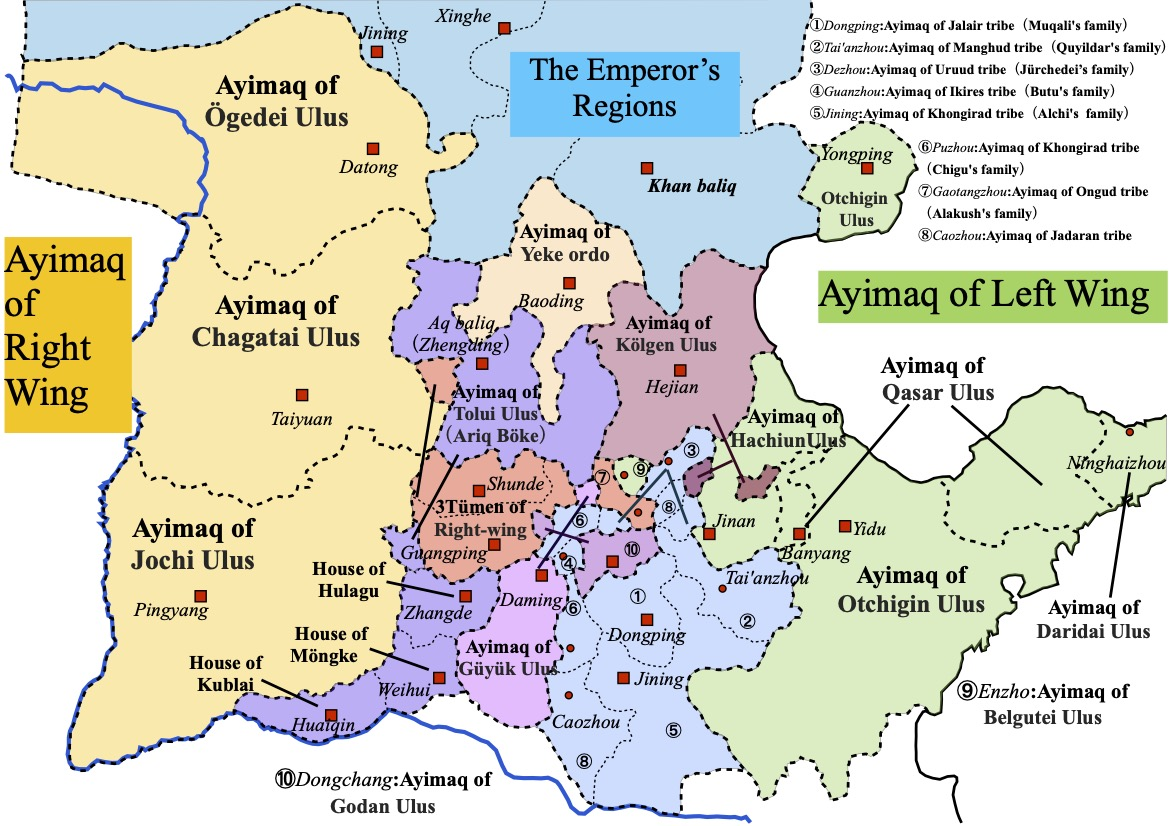
Mongol Empire's Ayimaq in North China

The territory of the Yuan dynasty was divided into the Central Region (腹裏) governed by the Central Secretariat and places under control of various provinces (行省) or Branch Secretariats (行中書省), as well as the region under the Bureau of Buddhist and Tibetan Affairs.

The Central Region, consisting of present-day Hebei, Shandong, Shanxi, the south-eastern part of present-day Inner Mongolia and the Henan areas to the north of the Yellow River, was considered the most important region of the dynasty and directly governed by the Central Secretariat (or Zhongshu Sheng, 中書省) at Khanbaliq (modern Beijing); similarly, another top-level administrative department called the Bureau of Buddhist and Tibetan Affairs (Chinese: 宣政院; pinyin: Xuānzhèng Yuàn) held administrative rule over the whole of modern-day Tibet and a part of Sichuan, Qinghai and Kashmir.

Branch Secretariats or simply provinces, were provincial-level administrative organizations or institutions, though they were not exactly provinces in modern sense. There were eleven "regular" provinces in Yuan dynasty, and their administrations were subordinated to the Central Secretariat.

Below the level of provinces, the largest political division was the circuit (道), followed by lù (路), fǔ (府), and zhōu (州). These are three kinds of prefecture-like divisions. The lowest political division was the county (縣).

Basically, lù were higher than fǔ, which were higher than zhōu. However, the actual relationship between them could be very complicated. All of lù, fǔ, and zhōu could administer counties. Some fǔ and zhōu were directly administered by the province, while some existed inside a lù. A lù usually administered several counties, along with several fǔ and zhōu, and the fǔ or zhōu themselves could also administer their own counties. As a result, it is impossible to delineate exactly how many tiers of divisions there were under a province.

This government structure at the provincial level was later inherited and modified by the Ming and Qing dynasties.

== Gallery ==
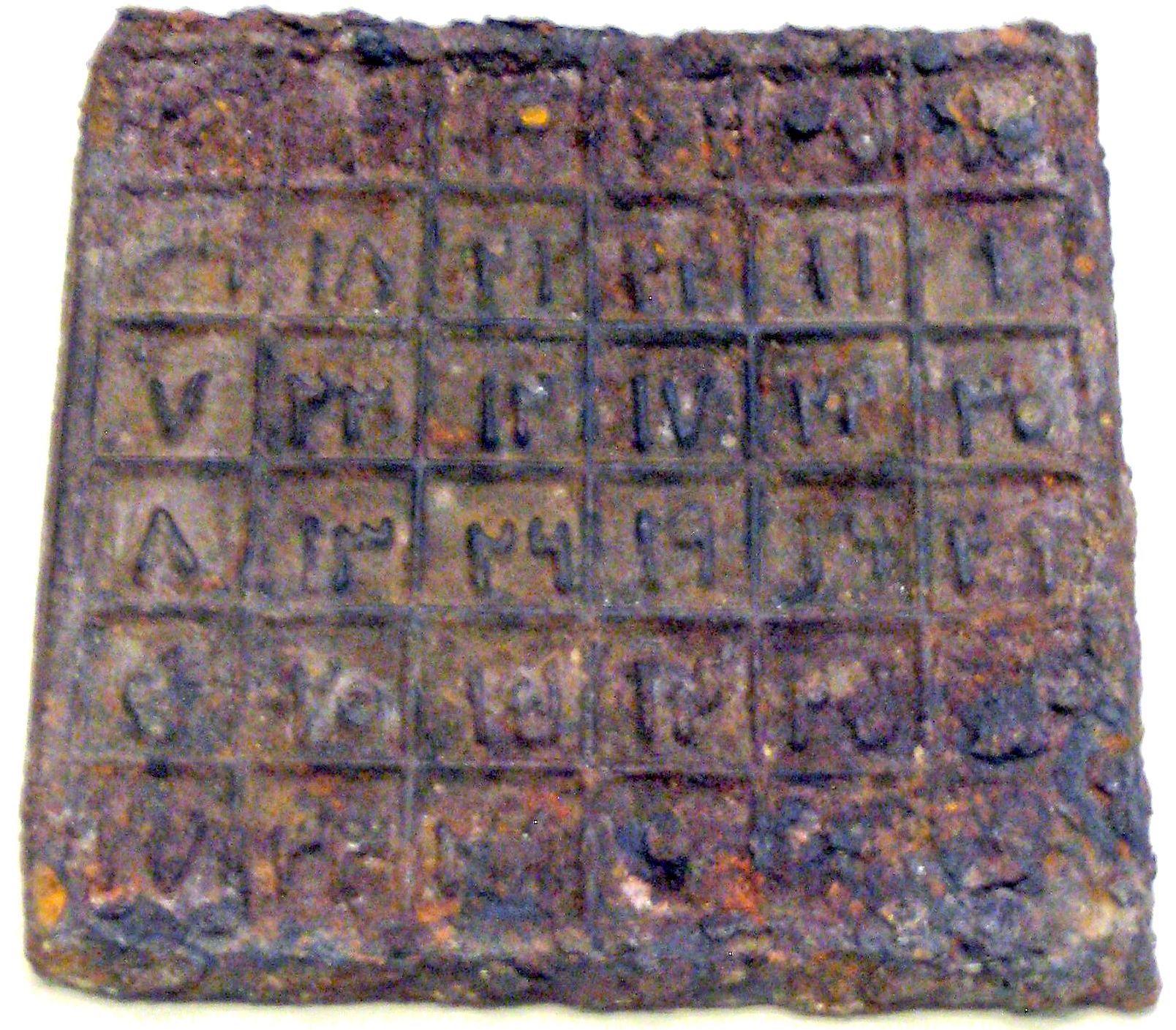
Magic square in Arabic numerals (Yuan dynasty)

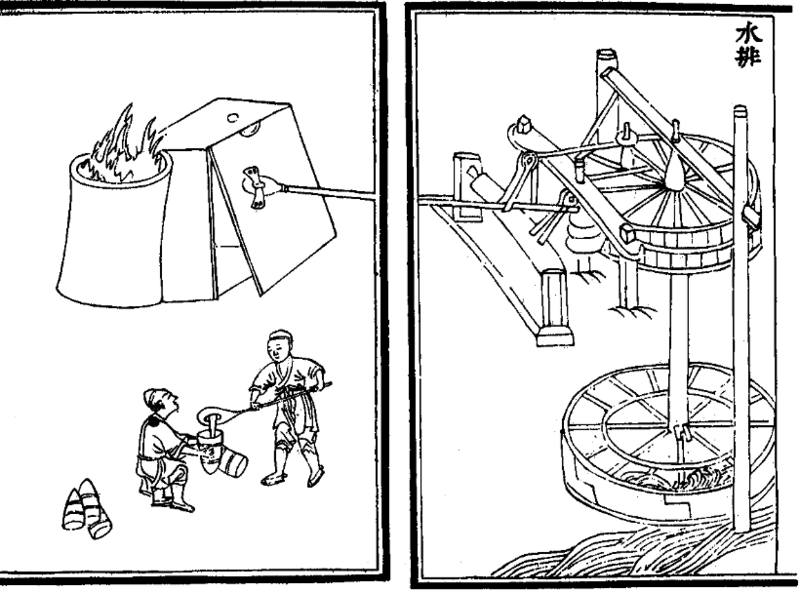
smelting machines (Yuan dynasty)

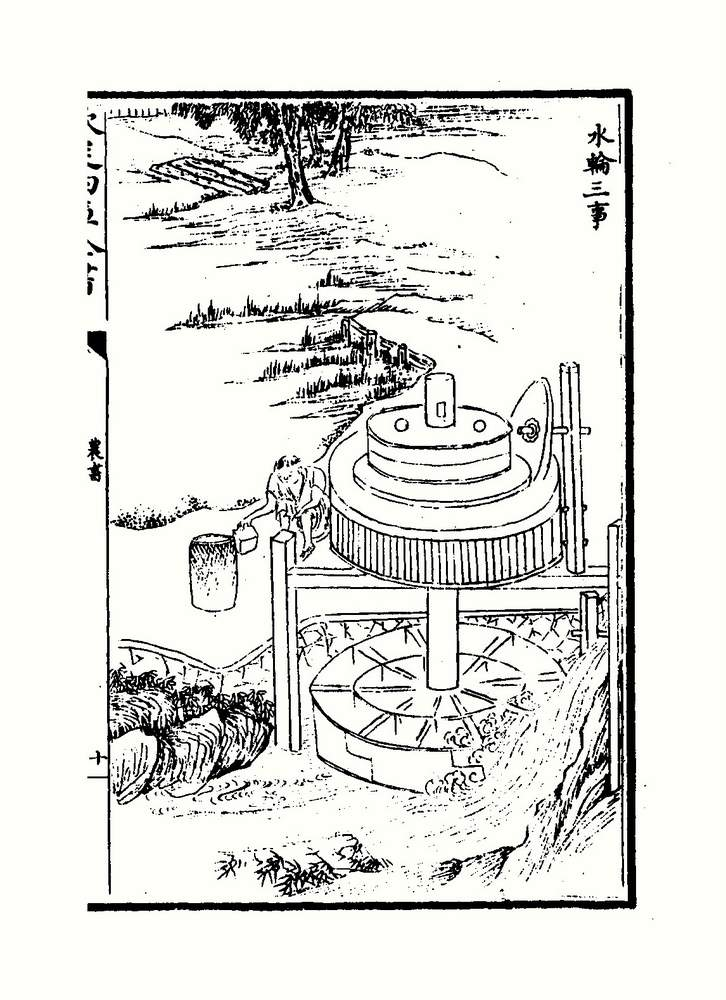
Water wheel (Yuan dynasty)

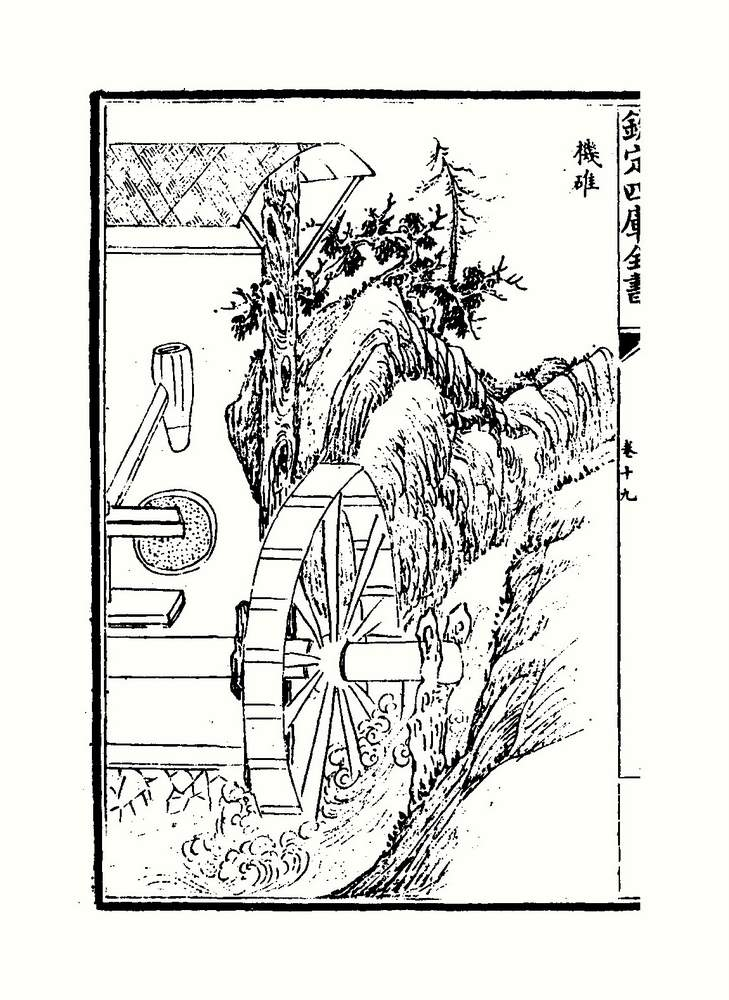
Water hammer (Yuan dynasty)

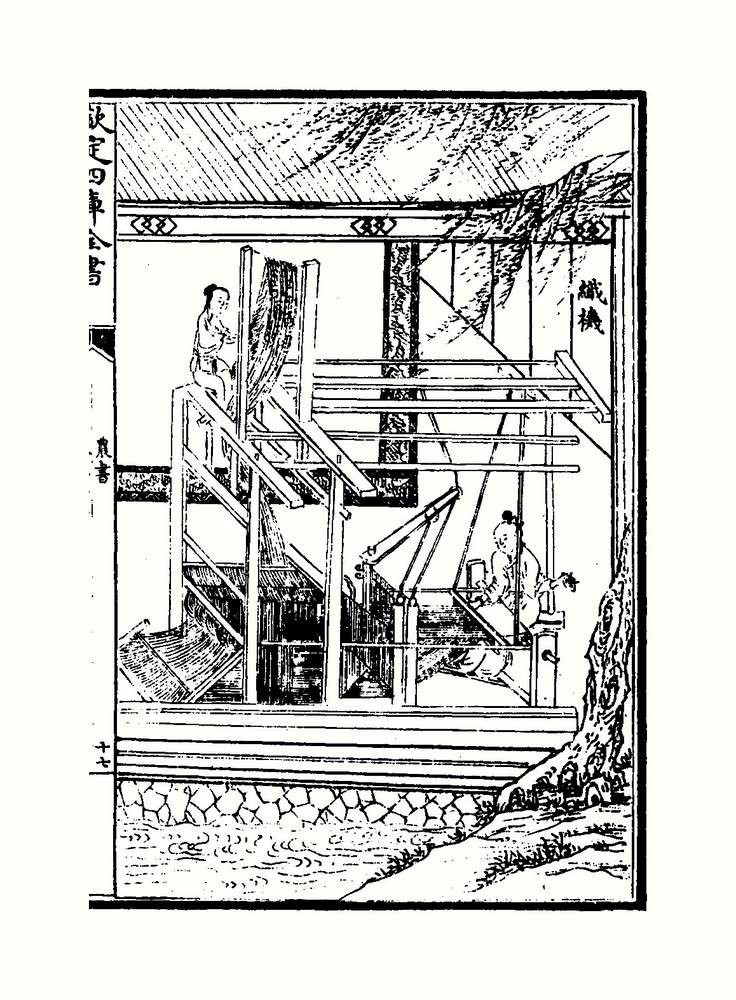
Weaving machine (Yuan dynasty)

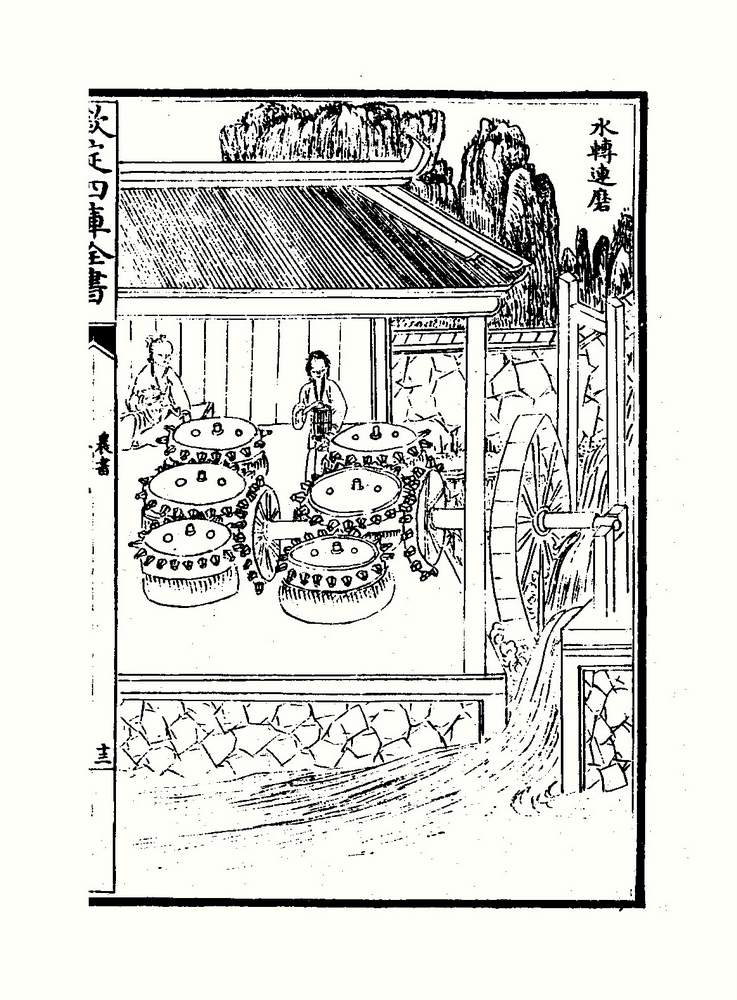
water mill gear (Yuan dynasty)

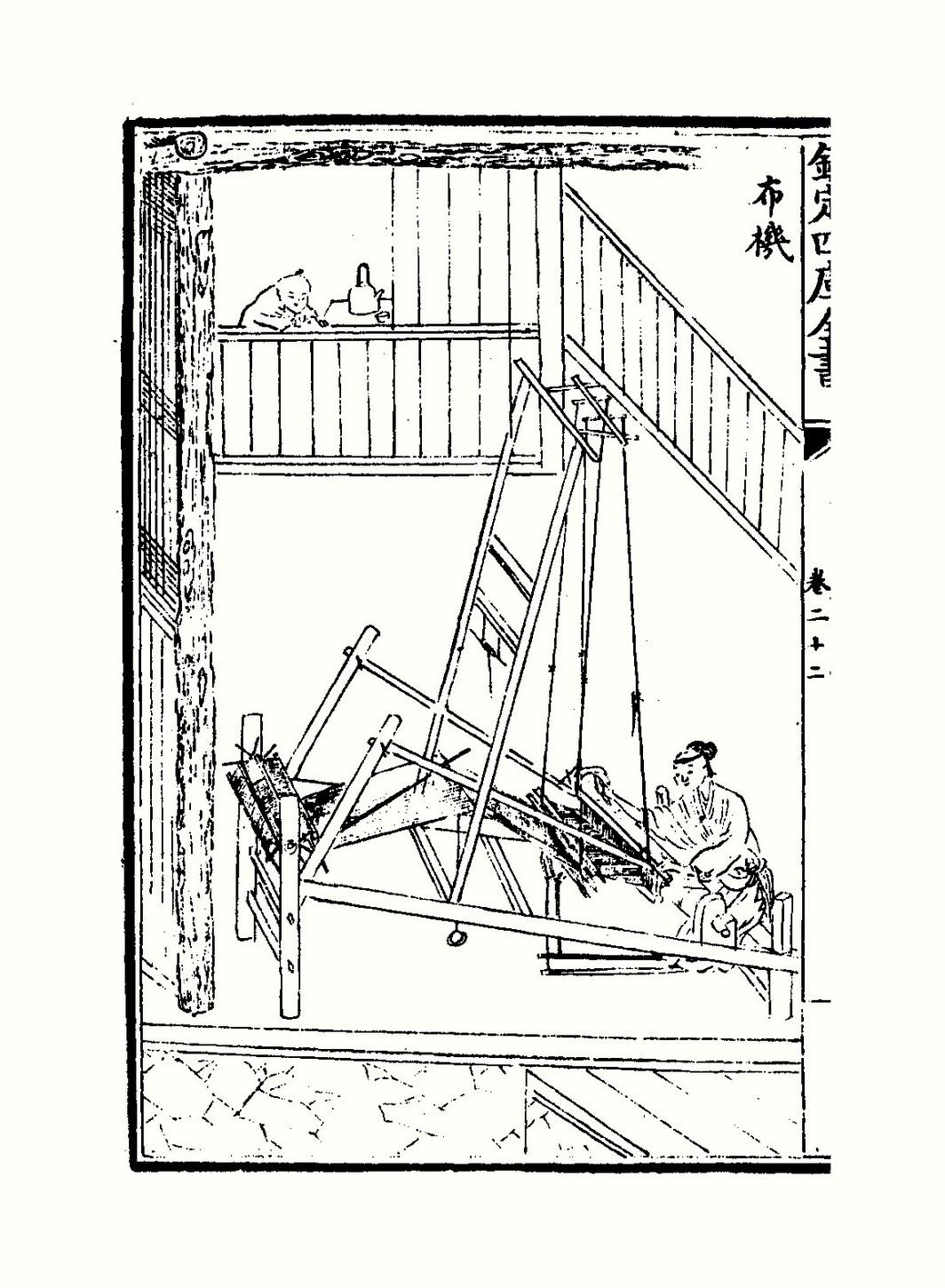
loom (Yuan dynasty)

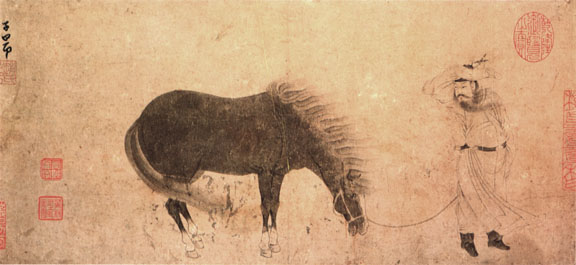
Yuan painting (Zhao Mengfu)

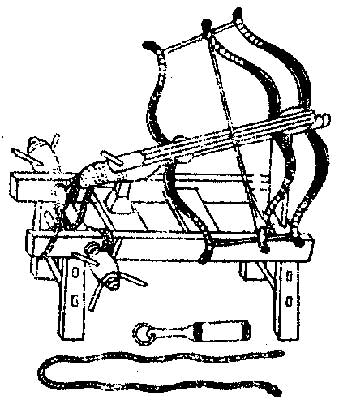
Chuangzi Nu (Yuan dynasty)

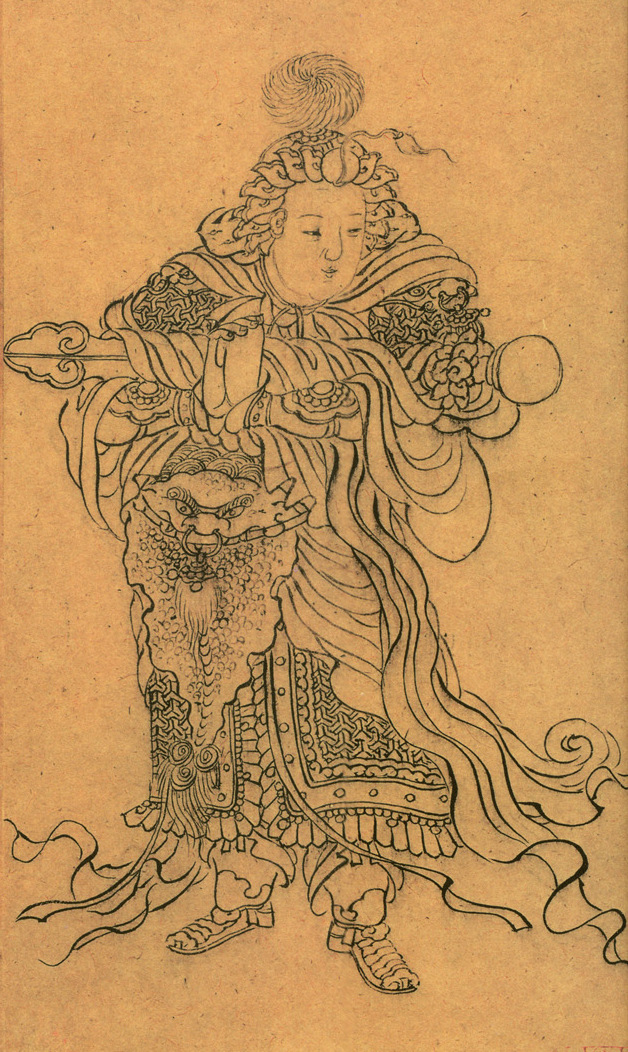
Military costume.

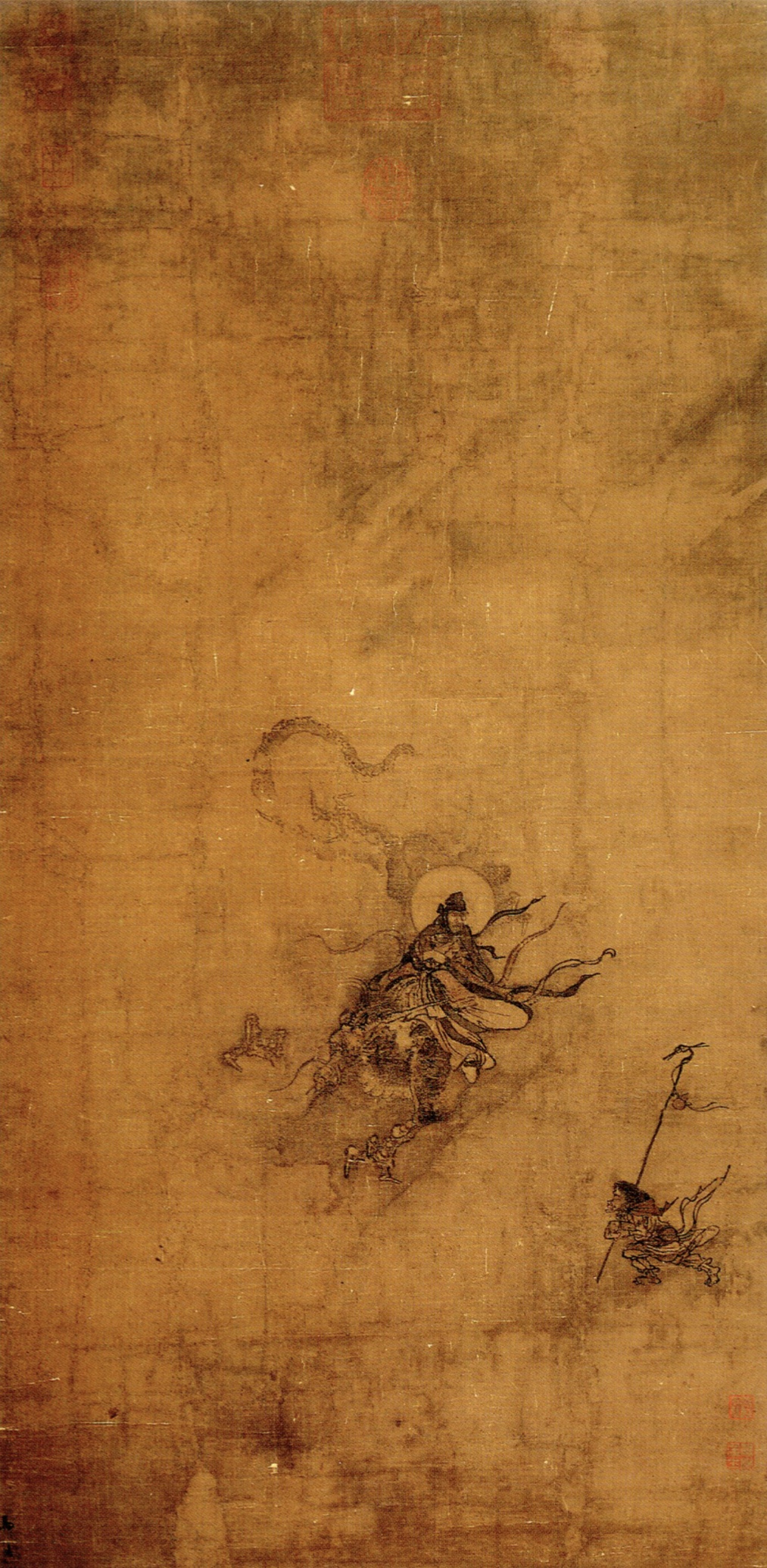
Yuan painting of a legendary figure riding on a dragon.

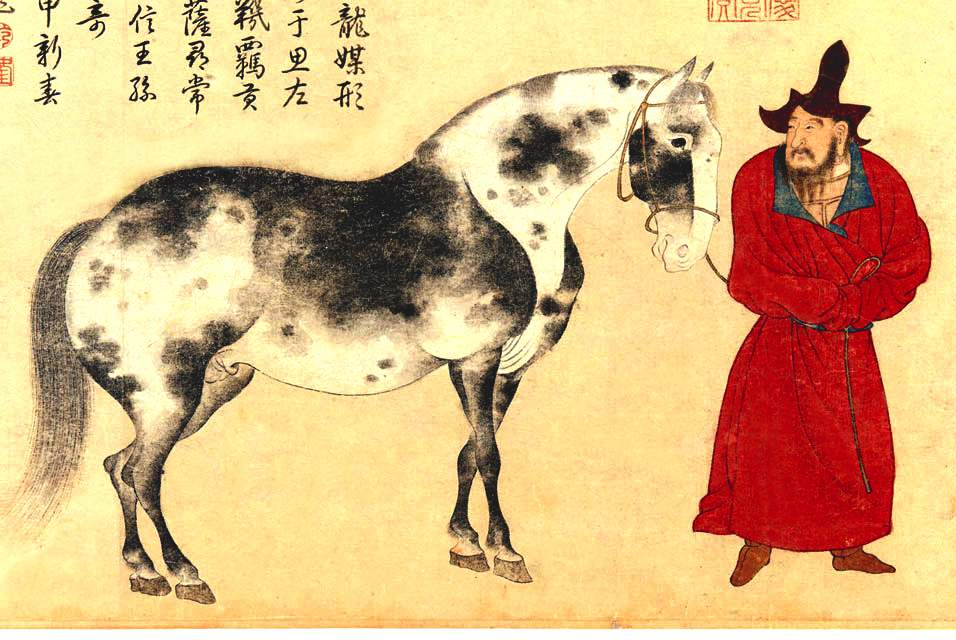
Yuan cavalry

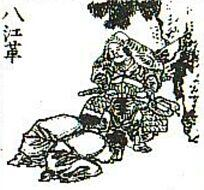
Yuan Mongol soldier

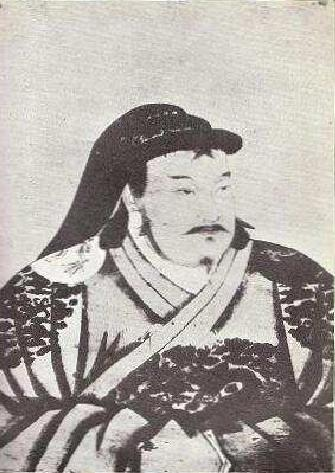
Genghis Khan's grandson, Kublai Khan during his youth

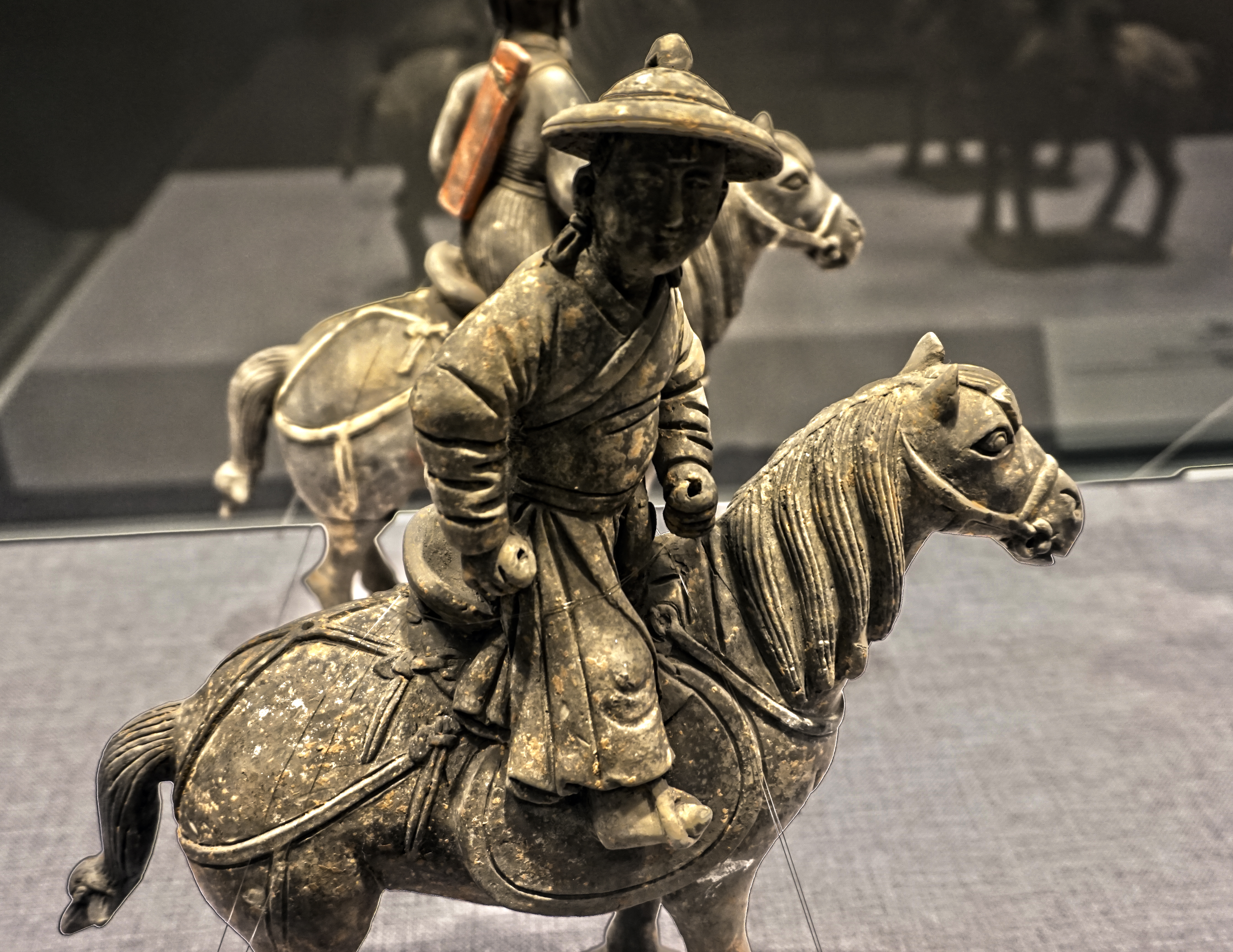
Mongol rider (Yuan dynasty)

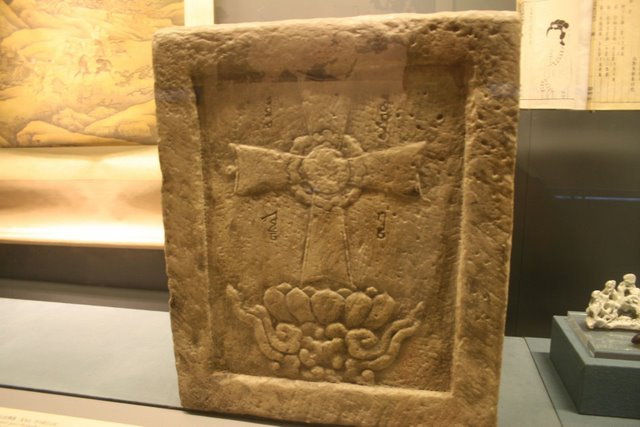
Chinese stone inscription of a Nestorian Christian Cross from Cross Temple in Beijing (then called Dadu, or Khanbaliq), dated to the Yuan dynasty

== See also ==
- List of emperors of the Yuan dynasty
  - Emperor's family tree
  - List of Mongol rulers
- Mughal Empire
- History of Mongolia
- History of China
- Administrative divisions of the Yuan dynasty
- Yuan dynasty in Inner Asia
  - Tibet under Yuan rule
  - Mongolia under Yuan rule
  - Manchuria under Yuan rule
- Yuan dynasty coinage
- Islam during the Yuan dynasty
- Europeans in Medieval China
- Hua-Yi distinction
- Jun ware
- List of largest empires
- Wu Qiuyan

== Notes ==
Preceded by Song dynasty Jin dynasty Western Liao; Western Xia; Dali Kingdom; Mongol Empire; Remnants of Tibet	Dynasties in Chinese history History of Mongolia / Tibet (With Goryeo in Korea as vassal); 1271–1368	Succeeded by Ming dynasty Northern Yuan dynasty Phagmodrupa dynasty
