= Mahmud Yalavach =

13th century Muslim administrator

- محمود یلواچ
- Emissary: Uncertain
- Yeke darughachi of Turkestan: 1229-1239/40
- Yeke darughachi of northern China: 1239/40-1242; 1246-?
- Mayor of Beijin: 1250s

Personal details
- Born: Khwarazm
- Died: 1255 or 1262

Mahmud Yalavach (Persian: محمود یلواچ, fl. 1218-1254/55 or 1262) (Note: also known as Mahmud al-Khwarazmi) was a Muslim administrator in the Mongol Empire who ruled over Turkestan and northern China as darughachi and eventually went on to be mayor of Beijing, at the time known as Zhongdu or Taidu.

== Early life ==
Yalavach originated in Khwarazm, in modern day Turkmenistan or Uzbekistan. It has suggested that Yalavach was the same person as Mahmud Bey, the vizier of the last Qara Khitai Gur-Khan, Yelü Zhilugu, who was overthrown by Kuchlug in 1211. This line of thinking holds that Mahmud, now unemployed, fled and became a merchant between 1211 and 1213. Other historians have disputed this. Whether or not Yalavach was Mahmud Bey, he began as an official in Qara Khitai, resisting Mongol incursions for a time.

== History ==
=== Reign of Genghis Khan ===
Yalavach began as a merchant from Khwarazm. He first came into contact with Genghis Khan as a representative of the Khwarazmian Empire. ʿAli Khwaja al-Bukhari and Yusuf Kanka al-Otrari were other Central Asian Muslims associated with him at the time. Yalavach became an emissary for Genghis Khan. Yalavach was so renown in this role that Muhammad II of Khwarazm made use of him as a spy, which Genghis Khan never learned of. However, Yalavach may have been an untrustworthy spy or a double agent, as he provided incorrect information at times, and failed to inform Muhammad II of key events, such as the capture of Zhongdu.

Under Genghis Khan, Yalavach was first made governor of Ghazni, then later branch secretariat of Transoxiana.

After conquering the Khwarazmian Empire, Genghis Khan established darughachin as administrators of the region, with yeke darughachin being the highest level of administrator. Yalavach, along with his son Masʿud Beg, were among the first yeke daruqachin. Yalavach was made yeke daruqachin of Turkestan. As yeke daruqchi of Turkestan, he repair damage to cities and the countryside, rebuild irrigation systems, and resettle populations who had been scattered during the invasion. While the Secret History of the Mongols states that Yalavach was yeke daruqachi during the reign of Genghis Khan, this characterization has been disputed as ahistorical.

=== Reign of Ögedei ===
Ögedei Khan brought change to the role of daruqachi, with more granular control on a regional level. Under Ögedei, Masʿud Beg, the son of Yalavach, was made yeke daruqachin of Turkestan, headquartered in Beshbaliq, while Yalavach was made yeke daruqachin of Northern China, including Uyghuristan. It's believed that Ögedei assigned them this way due to their familiarity with the Qara Khitai empire. It has also been suggested that Yalavach was unpopular in Central Asia, which led to his transfer. He may have also been moved to settle a dispute about how to produce more tax revenue in the region.

While still stationed in Turkestan, Yalavach had a dispute with Chagatai Khan regarding their administrative territory. Transoxiana was in the lands administered by Yalavach, but Chagatai was given power over it. When Yalavach visited the region in an attempt to settle the dispute, he was rebuked. After discussing the issue with one of Chagatai's viziers, Vazir, the matter was settled and Chagatai apologized. However, this incident may be another factor in Yalavach's transfer to China, as after his transfer, Transoxiana was governed by Chagatai.

Under the rule of Yalavach and his son, Masʿud Beg, Bukhara became one of the most prosperous cities in the Muslim world. However, it was also during their administration, in 1238-39, that a Muslim uprising occurred, which led to the region being ruined in a way it had not recovered from by the early 20th century. The uprising, led by Mahmud Tarabi, was religious in nature. Tarabi was seen as a holy man believed to be capable of healing the ill. He may have been supported by Chagatai as retribution for the previous land dispute. Yalavach invited him to his home in Khujand; however, Tarabi guessed their attention and refused the visit. His seeming understanding of human nature increased his reverence among the laity. During the Mongol response to the uprising, Yalavach was a voice of reason, attempting to avoid mass slaughter of the lay people by the Mongols.

In order to rebuild the Mongol treasury, which had been drained by militant campaigns, Ögedei began a system of regular taxation under Yalavach's influence, with further influence by Yelü Chucai inspired by reforms he had undertaken in 1229. In 1235–6, Yelü Chucai and Shigi Qutuqu conducted a census of northern China, as a means of demonstrating the importance of sedentary populations to the nomadic Mongols. This led to the end of plunder as a form of taxation, replaced with regular and formal taxation. Yalavach adopted a similar method in Central Asia, which would remain used until 1239 or 1240, after which point he was transferred to northern China. The reforms which Yalavach put into place in northern China were later made to be the standard for the entire empire. Yalavach’s system was based on the Mongol system of qubchur, a poll tax on adult males paid in cash. Yalavach's system may have also been influenced by the jizya. While Chucai and Qutuqu played a part in developing this system of taxes, the system which was used throughout the empire is credited solely to Yalavach.

An anecdote from Rashid al-Din Hamadani, during Ögedei's reign, in which Ögedei ordered a merchant be paid 200 balish for a Persian hat and increases the amount to be paid as people begin to doubt him, portrays Yalavach as being a notable member of his court, while not entirely distinguishable in his opinions. The anecdote ends with a statement that those from the court should be punished for doubting the intentions of their khan.

=== Reign of Töregene ===
Following the rise of Töregene Khatun in 1242, Yalavach was dismissed as administrator, along with other officials, such as Chuchai, Qutuqu, and Chinqai. The reason for Yalavach's dismissal may have been due to a grudge he had with Fatima Khatun, a slave who had become Töregene's closest advisor. Töregene was also supported by Chagatai. His dismissal may have also been prompted by damage to his reputation caused by issues which had been caused by Abd-ur-Rahman, which Yalavich failed to fix, causing alienation among the Chinese court staff. The Chinese court staff also resented Yalavach for his foreign additions to policy, such as his taxation policies.

Following his dismissal, Fatima attempted to have Yalavach arrested, sending Ogal Qorchi. Yalavach greeted him cheerfully and treated Ogal Qorchi like an honored guest. Using acts of kindness and respect, he trapped Ogal Qorchi and his companions in his camp, while conspiring to flee. After two days, Yalavach got Oqal Qorchi blackout drunk, at which point he escaped with a guard of horsemen. Following this, he found refuge in Godan Khan's camp.

Töregene attempted to have Godan hand over Yalavach to have him be arrested, but Godan refused, saying “The kite that takes refuge in a bramble patch from the talons of the hawk is safe from his enemy’s might.”

When Töregene dismissed Yalavach, she also abolished his system of taxation, which was replaced with a system of tax farming. This has been seen as prioritizing short-term gains, rather than long-term benefit. She replaced Yalavach with ʿAbd al-Rahman, an ortogh merchant, who had been recommended by Fatima Khatun.

While the above is based on Persian sources, such as Rashid al-Din and Shams al-Din Juvayni, a separate claim regarding Yalavach's dismissal is found in Chinese sources, which claims that Yalavach was dismissed prior to Ögedei's death due to falling out of favor. However, the Persian version of the story is the one which historians believe is more accurate.

=== Reign of Güyük ===
After the election of Güyük Khan, the transition of power was slow. However, when Güyük came to power, he did as his mother had done and purged the royal court of officials loyal to her. This included Fatima Khatun and ʿAbd al-Rahman being executed. Following these purges, administrators associated with the previous regime were returned to power. This included Yalavach, who returned to his previous position in northern China, while Masʿud Beg returned to Turkestan. Güyük also restored Yalavach's taxation policies.

=== Reign of Oghul Qaimis ===
Following the death of Güyük in 1248, the taxation policies of Güyük were maintained under the rule of Oghul Qaimish, with no significant purges happening in the royal court.

=== Reign of Möngke ===
When Möngke Khan took power, he purged the officials of Oghul Qaimish, as well as some remaining officials from the reign of Töregene. According to Rashid al-Din, this purge came at the suggestion of Yalavach.

Yalavach supported the coronation of Möngke. For the celebrations following the coronation, Yalavach provided a tent lined with gold brocade, along with expensive carpets. Yalavach also provided entertainment in this tent.

Möngke reformed Mongol administration, changing the nature of administrative regions. He also abolished both the ortogh system and tax farming system and he maintained Yalavach and Masʿud Beg as administrators of northern China and Turkestan. Yalavach's taxation system was modified and implemented for sedentary populations throughout the empire.

Around this time, Yalavach came to be associated with Kublai Khan. In 1252, Kublai Khan criticized Yalavach for his judicial style. Reportedly, when Zhao Bi criticized Yalavach for his presumptuous attitude towards the throne, Yalavach was dismissed and died shortly later. However, other accounts state he instead died in 1254, and others say lived into the 1260s.

During the reign of Möngke, Yalavach was seen as an elder statesman, whose wisdom came from his age. In addition to yeke daruqachi, he was also given the role of yeke jaruchi.

=== Reign of Kublai Khan ===
Sources differ as to whether Yalavach lived into the reign of Kublai Khan or whether he died during the reign of Möngke. According to Timothy May, Yalavach is attested to during the reign of Kublai Khan by Chinese historical sources, such as him being in power in Beijing. If he was alive during this era, then he played a role in the rise of Kublai Khan. He is also credited with helping Kublai Khan fight of Central Asian empires.

== See also ==
- Society of the Mongol Empire
