= Fatima Khatun =

Favourite of Töregene in the Mongol Empire

- فاطمه خاتون

Advisor
- In office 1242–1246
- Appointed by: Töregene Khatun

Personal details
- Born: Tus, Iran
- Died: 1246

Fatima Khatun (Persian: فاطمه خاتون, Persian pronunciation: [fɑteˈme xɑˈt̂ʰun], d. 1246) (Note: also sometimes given as Fāṭima) was an influential figure in the Mongol Empire as a favourite of Töregene Khatun, regent of the empire from 1241 to 1246.^{:52}

== Early life ==
Fatima originated from the city of Tus, in modern-day Iran, close to the city of Meshed, and was a Shia Muslim of Persian or Tajik descent.^{:115} She might have also been a sayyid. During the Mongol invasion of the Khwarazmian Empire she was enslaved, along with her family, and brought via the slave trade in the Mongol Empire to the Mongol capital Kharakorum.^{:87}

During her time as a slave in Mongolia, Fatima worked as a merchant and as a manager for local prostitutes, although the latter has been alleged to be historical slander by historians contemporary to Fatima.^{:174}

== History ==
=== Reign of Töregene ===
At an unknown date she was given as a slave to Töregene Khatun, who was the daughter-in-law of Genghis Khan through her marriage to Ögedei Khan. According to the Persian historian and Mongol official Minhaj-i Siraj Juzjani, who was a contemporary of hers, Fatima "had been captured near the city of Mashhad in Iran during the Mongol conquests under Genghis Khan. She was given as a slave to Töregene Khatun" who eventually became a member of Töregene's ordu.^{:87} Fatima was considered intelligent, well-read, and cultured, as well as shrewd and cunning.

In 1241, after the death of Ögedei Khan, power passed to the hands of one of his widows, Möge Khatun (who had previously also been one of Genghis Khan's wives). However, in the spring of 1242, Töregene Khatun assumed complete power as regent with the support of her sons and Chagatai. She took on the title of Great Khatun and replaced Ögedei's ministers with her own. One of the replacements was Fatima, who took over in place of Chinqai.^{:375} Fatima was Töregene's most influential cabinet member, as well as an intimate partner.^{:52}

According to Juzjani and Rashid al-Din Hamadani, Töregene and Fatima were staunch conservatives who purged the court of progressive, reform-minded figures. In their accounts, the two women are portrayed as grudgeholding and oppressive. However, this characterization has been challenged by Anne Broadbridge, who ascribed these slanderous accounts to misogyny, contrasting the framing of Töregene's rule against the lighter treatment other male Mongol leaders who enacted similar policies are treated in such histories.^{:175}

As a member of Töregene's cabinet, Fatima played a major role in politics. While older ministers were debarred from executing business, she was free to issue commands and prohibitions.^{:115} She is said to have had a bias towards sayyids, of which she claimed to be.

Fatima's policies as a minister were considered rapacious and extractive.^{:192} For example, through Fatima's influence, she dismissed Mahmud Yalavach, whom she may have had a grudge against, and replaced him with Abd-ur-Rahman, an Uyghur or Persian Muslim tax farmer who had served under Ögedei Khan, was put in charge of general administration in North China. It's believed that Fatima or Töregene knew Abd-ur-Rahman previously as an ortogh. When removing Yalavach from power, Fatima attempted to have him arrested. However, he escaped and found a place in Koden's court. After Yalavach escaped, Töregene repeatedly demanded that Koden surrender him, but Koden refused, arguing that returning someone who had sought his protection would be a breach to honour and promising instead to bring Yalavach before a future qurultay for investigation.

Other figures removed from power by Fatima include Chinqai, Yelü Chucai, Ghiyas-ud-din Baraq, and Korguz. Korguz was executed. In replacing these figures, in addition to that of Töregene, she also had the support of Qara Hülegü and Doquz Khatun, who are believed to have played a role in their attempted arrest and execution.

Fatima also put into power Sharaf al-Dīn, a tax collector from Khorasan and Mazandaran.^{:175}

Although having a woman in a ministerial post was unusual for the 13th century, Fatima attained a very powerful position at the Mongol court. So great did her influence become that she was given the title of Fatima Khatun by Persian scholars, which was the same honorific title that Töregene used.^{:115}

However, Fatima's role in the court was controversial. Abd-ur-Rahman was seen as a poor administrator in China. The men that Fatima installed were labeled as ignorant.

=== Reign of Güyük ===
In 1246, Töregene's son Güyük Khan came to power, and Töregene resigned from the regency. Despite Töregene's role in ensuring Güyük's election as Khagan, the two had a poor relationship. Güyük wished to remove his mother's power from the court, which meant targeting her advisors. Dealing with Fatima was considered the utmost priority for Guyuk, even above dealing with Temüge, the youngest brother of Genghis Khan, who had recently attempted a coup.

The first person executed in Güyük's purge was Abd-ur-Rahman, an administrator Fatima had put into power. In addition to her relationship with Töregene, Fatima was targeted due to her attempt to have Chinqai and Mahmud Yalavach be executed. Fatima opposed their plans for regular taxation, while she preferred a more extractive approach to finance similar to those of Ögedei Khan.^{:191}

According to the Persian chronicler Juzjani, Güyük's brother Koden accused Fatima of using witchcraft to damage his health.^{:119} When Koden supposedly died a few months later, Güyük chose to target Fatima in response. In reality, Koden died after Güyük's reign, anywhere from 1248 to 1253. This account has been alleged by Timothy May to be historical misinformation from Sunni Muslims, due to the fact that Fatima was a Shia Muslim.

Konstantin Golev suggested that, while Koden did not die during Güyük's reign, he may have suffered from a type of palsy, which could be where the allegations of witchcraft came from. However, he also suggested that Koden and Güyük may have had a pre-existing conspiracy against Fatima.

As Juzjani's story goes, Güyük initially tried to have Fatima arrested for witchcraft, to which Töregene refused.^{:119} She was willing to forgo political life in order to live a quiet life with Fatima.^{:120} When Güyük attempted to seize Fatima, Töregene threatened to kill herself.

Güyük was not satisfied. He brought Fatima to his court, naked and bound, and attempted to torture a confession out of her. Torture was against Mongol law of the time, but Güyük got around this by arguing that Fatima was not a Mongol, so she was not covered by the law. Her torture was made public and included beatings and burnings which were intended to cause pain without shedding blood.^{:120} In addition to her torture, Fatima's family and supporters were executed.^{:192}

As a result of her torture, Fatima confessed to every crime she had been accused of. Rather than letting her die of her wounds or executing her quickly, Güyük had her orifices sewed shut and had her wrapped in felt, before being thrown in a river, identified as the Kherlen River.^{:121} This method of execution was one which was used to contain the evil powers of a witch.^{:192}

Other contemporary sources, such as those by Christian authors, emphasized that Fatima's arrest and execution was on political grounds, rather than the witchcraft allegations found in Muslim sources. Some authors, such as Michael Hope, have instead chosen to characterize Fatima's death as political in nature, predating the allegations of witchcraft.

Töregene's supporters in the imperial household were simultaneously purged with Fatima's death. Agents were even sent to Meshed to execute Fatima's family members and those who had been associated with her earlier in life. Golev used this as an example of how Fatima's execution was primarily political in nature, with witchcraft merely being an excuse.

Within 18 months of Fatima's death, Töregene herself died under still unexplained circumstances.^{:382} Heartbreak over the death of Fatima has been suggested as a potential cause for her death.^{:193} Some accounts also say that Töregene's death came before that of Fatima, including the possibility that Töregene's death delayed the arrest and execution of Fatima.

=== Reign of Möngke ===
Following the death of Güyük, former supporters of Töregene in the court of Möngke Khan sought revenge for the persecution of Fatima and her contemporaries.

== Perception ==
Contemporary portraits of Fatima Khatun were highly negative, positioning her as scheming and shrewd, with policies which brought ruin to the empire. However, retroactive assessments have challenged these assumptions. Factual issues in contemporary histories have been cited as an issue which suggests the accounts are not entirely factual. Recent defenses of Fatima Khatun have focused on her as a maligned Shia Muslim or as a woman falling victim to misogyny.

In modern day Iran, Fatima Khatun is celebrated as a female hero in Persian history.

== In popular culture ==
- Fatima appears as a minor character in the Italian-French film Marco Polo (1962) and in the Chinese television series The Legend of Kublai Khan (2013).
- A fictionalized version of Fatima features as the protagonist in the 2021 manga series A Witch's Life in Mongol by Tomato Soup, which was adapted into an anime television series in 2026.
