= Society of the Mongol Empire =

13th-century Mongol social structure

The expansion of the Mongol Empire over time

Mongols living within the Mongol Empire (1206–1368) maintained their own culture, not necessarily reflective of the majority population of the historical Mongolian empire, as most of the non-Mongol peoples inside it were allowed to continue their own social customs. The Mongol class largely lead separate lives, although over time there was a considerable cultural influence, especially in Persia and China.

Some Mongols tended to make the transition from a nomadic way of life, based in yurt tents and herding livestock, to living in cities as the imposed rulers of a local population backed up by the Mongol army. But where possible they tended to retain their habits and customs, especially in matters to do with the family. They were given lavish grants of land and sometimes other sources of revenue.

== Administration ==
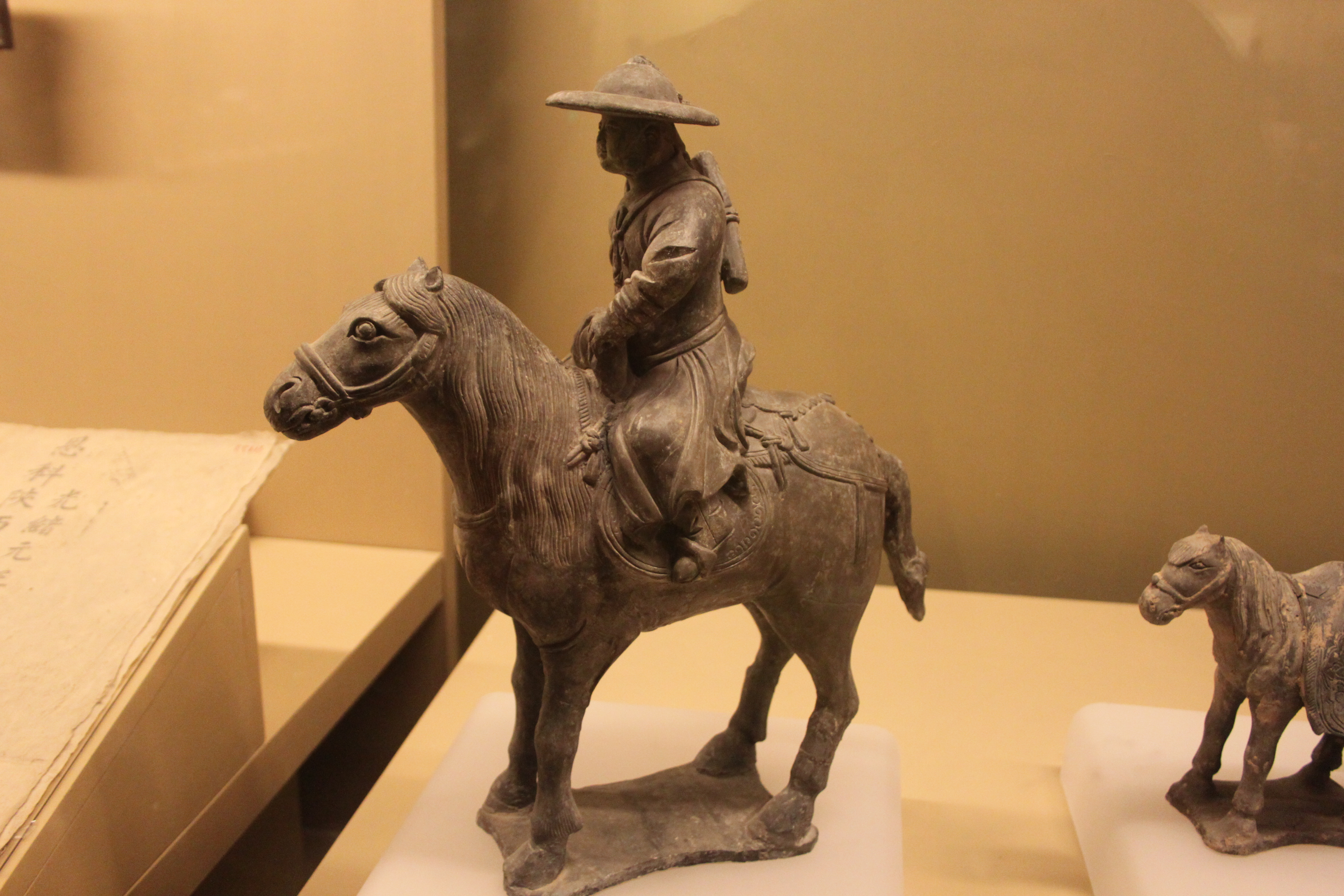
Courier figurine, Yuan dynasty

Mongol governments would regularly appoint regional administrators from disparate places in the empire to rule other areas, sending Han Chinese and Khitans from China to serve as administrators over the Muslim population in Bukhara in Central Asia, and importing Central Asians to serve as administrators in China. This strategy was meant to curtail power of the local peoples of dominated lands.

== Food and cuisine ==
There are two different groups of food, "red foods", which make up much of the diet during the winter, and "white foods", which make up much of the diet during the summer. "White foods" are usually dairy products such as cheese, yogurt, and "airag" or lightly fermented mare's milk. Milk was also rarely drunk fresh. "Red foods" are usually meat products though meat was also hunted from wild game such as rabbits, deer, wild boar, squirrels, and marmots during the summer.

Winter meat was usually from sheep and less commonly horses. Ice fishing also occurred. Meat was preserved by cutting the meat into strips and then letting it dry by the sun and the wind, freezing, jerking, and smoking, or less commonly eaten fresh. During the winter sheep were the only domestic animal slaughtered, and horses were occasionally slaughtered for ceremonies. Meat was boiled and flavored by wild garlic or onions.

Animals were slaughtered in a specific way. The animal was laid on its back and restrained. A knife would be used to cut the chest open and the aorta squeezed, which killed the animal while retaining the blood within the animal's carcass. Blood was an important ingredient that was used fresh, for broths, and for sausages.

Vegetables were generally limited to wild varieties or those acquired through trade or tribute. Grain was made into porridge or dough fried in fat.

Meal etiquette during large gatherings and ceremonies involved a meat meal cut up into small pieces. Guests were served their meat on skewers and the host determined the order of serving. People of different social classes were assigned to different parts of the meat and it was the responsibility of the "Baluchis" to know who was in each social class. The meat was eaten with fingers and the grease was wiped on the ground or clothing.

The most commonly imported fare was liquor, the most popular of which were Chinese rice wine and Turkestani grape wine. Genghis Khan was first presented with grape wine in 1204 where he dismissed it as dangerously strong. Drunkenness was common at festivals and gatherings. Singing and dancing were also common after the consumption of alcohol. Due to Turkestani and Middle Eastern influences, noodles started to appear in Mongol food. Spices such as cardamom and other food such as chickpeas and fenugreek seeds also became part of the diet due to these external influences.

In the Mongolian Empire the office of ba’urchi, generally translated as “cook,” or sometimes as “steward” or “commissary,” had a closeness to the ruler and his right to act on his behalf. Cooks were officers in the imperial guard (keshig), one formation of which, the night guard (kebte’ül), oversaw the provision and preparation of drink and food (undan ide’en) during the reigns of Chinggis Qan and Ögödei; in addition to their titular duties these officers often held active military commands. Some high-ranking officials, such as Bolad, Bolad's father, and Rashīd al-Dīn began as cooks.

In 1246, when Friar Carpini attended Güyüg's enthronment, the only food mentioned was salted and unsalted meat in broth. However, less than a decade later, when Rubruck arrived in Qara Worum, there were more foods such as millet with butter, boiled dough, sour milk, unleavened bread, cooking oil, wine, mead, vinegar, and dried nuts and fruits including almonds, grapes, and dried plums.

== Economy of the Mongol Empire ==
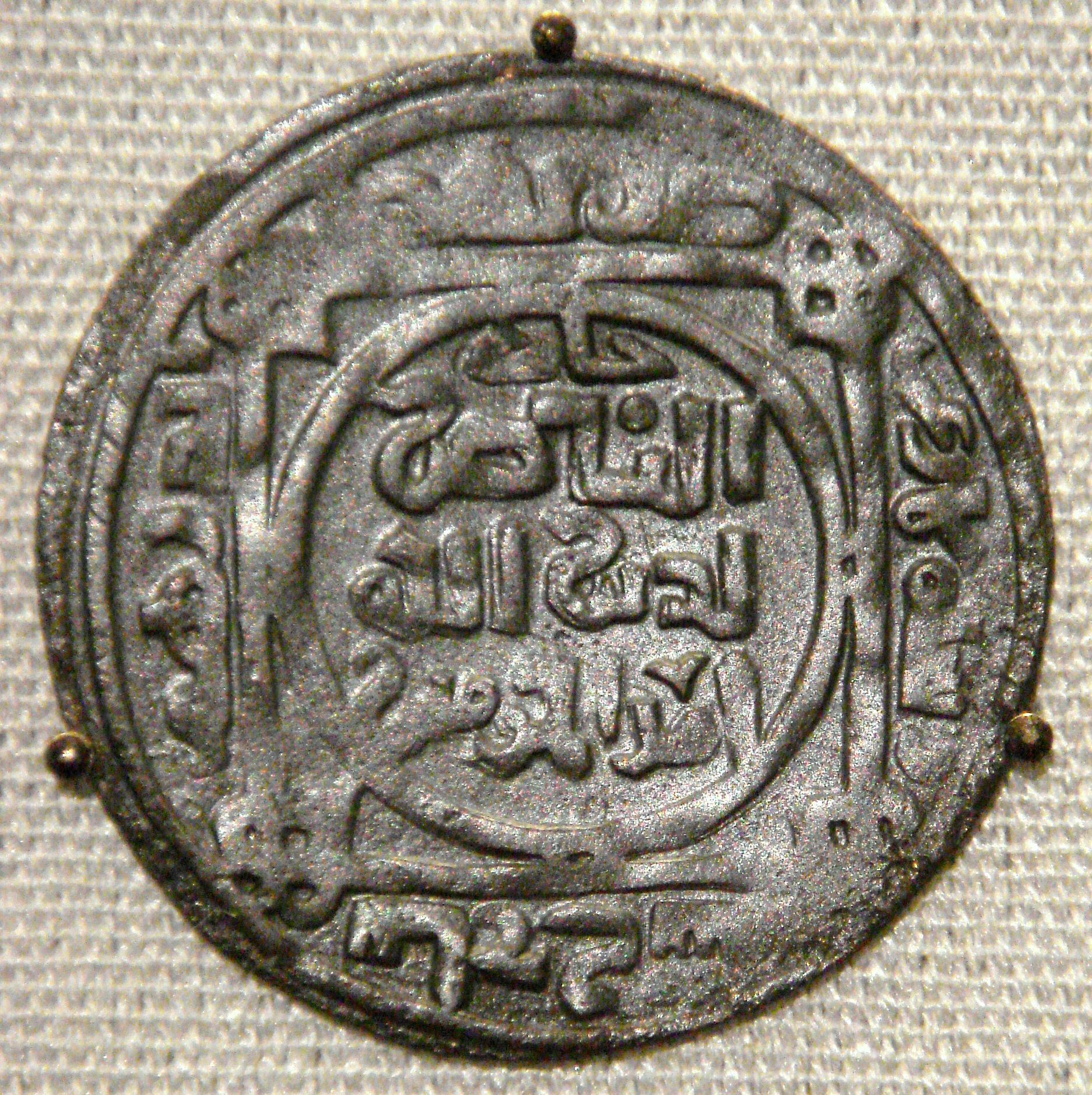
Mongol "Great Khans" coin, minted at Balkh, Afghanistan, AH 618, 1221 CE.

=== Money ===
Paper money was authorized in 1227. It was backed by precious metals and silk. The Mongols used Chinese silver ingot as unified money of public account while circulating paper money in China and coins in the western areas of the empire such as Golden Horde and Chagatai Khanate. Under Ögedei Khan the Mongol government issued paper currency backed by silk reserves and founded a department that was responsible for destroying old notes. In 1253, Möngke established a Department of Monetary affairs to control the issuance of paper money to eliminate the overissue of the currency by Mongol and non-Mongol nobles since the reign of Great Khan Ögedei. His authority established a united measure based on sukhe or silver ingot, however, the Mongols allowed their foreign subjects to mint coins in the denominations and use the weight they traditionally used. During the reigns of Ögedei, Güyük, and Möngke, Mongol coinage increased with gold and silver coinage in Central Asia and copper and silver coins in Caucasus, Iran, and southern Russia.

The Yuan dynasty under Kublai Khan issued paper money backed by silver, and again banknotes supplemented by cash and copper cash. Marco Polo wrote that the money was made of mulberry bark. The standardization of paper currency allowed the Yuan court to monetize taxes and reduce the carrying costs of taxes on goods as did the policy of Möngke Khan. But the forest nations of Siberia and Manchuria still paid their taxes on goods or commodities to the Mongols. Jiaochao was used only within the Yuan dynasty, and even Ilkhan Rinchindorj Gaykhatu, who was supportive of the Yuan leadership in other ways, failed to adopt the monetary experiment in his Middle East realm in 1294. As did the khanates of the Golden Horde and Chagatai Khanate, the Ilkhanate minted their coins in gold, silver, and copper. Ghazan's fiscal reforms enabled the inauguration of a unified bimetallic currency in the Ilkhanate. Chagatai Khan Kebek renewed the coinage backed by silver reserves and created a unified monetary system through the realm.

Mongol government and elites invested in commercial enterprises using metal coins, paper money, gold and silver ingots, and tradable wares for partnership investments and primarily financed money-lending and trade activities. A paper money investment was not possible in the western Mongol empire.

== Trade routes ==
The Mongols had a strong history of supporting merchants and trade. Genghis Khan had encouraged foreign merchants early in his career, even before uniting the Mongols. Merchants provided him with information about neighboring cultures, served as diplomats and official traders for the Mongols, and were essential for many needed goods since the Mongols produced little of their own. Mongols sometimes provided capital for merchants, and sent them far afield, in an auto (merchant partner) arrangement. As the Empire grew, any merchants or ambassadors with proper documentation and authorization, received protection and sanctuary as they traveled through Mongol realms. Well-traveled and relatively well-maintained roads linked lands from the Mediterranean basin to China, greatly increasing overland trade, resulting in some dramatic stories of those who traveled what became known as the Silk Road. One of the best-known travelers from West to East was Marco Polo, and a comparable journey from East to West was that of the Chinese Mongol monk Rabban Bar Sauma, who traveled from his home of Khanbaliq (Beijing) as far as Europe. Missionaries such as William of Rubruck also traveled to the Mongol court, on missions of conversion, or as papal envoys, carrying correspondence between the Pope and the Mongols as attempts were made to form a Franco-Mongol alliance. It was rare though for anyone to travel the entire length of the Silk Road. Instead, traders moved products much like a bucket brigade, with luxury goods being traded from one middleman to another, from China to the West, resulting in extravagant prices for the trade goods.

After Genghis, the merchant partner business continued to flourish under his successors Ögedei and Güyük. Merchants brought clothing, food, and other provisions to the imperial palaces, and in return, the Great Khans gave the merchant's tax exemptions and allowed them to use the official relay stations of the Mongol Empire. Merchants also served as tax farmers in China, Russia, and Iran. If the merchants were attacked by bandits, losses were made up from the imperial treasury.

Policies changed under the Great Khan Möngke. Because of money laundering and overtaxing, he attempted to limit abuses and sent imperial investigators to supervise the auto businesses. He decreed all merchants must pay commercial and property taxes, and he paid off all drafts drawn by high-ranking Mongol elites from the merchants. This policy continued in the Yuan dynasty. Möngke-Temür granted the Genoese and the Venetians exclusive rights to hold Caffa and Azov in 1267. The Golden Horde permitted German merchants to trade in all of its territories including Russian principalities in the 1270s. The Mongols developed the concepts of liability in relation to investments and loans in Mongol–ortoq partnerships, promoting trade and investment to facilitate the commercial integration of the Mongol Empire. In Mongol times, the contractual features of a Mongol-ortoq partnership closely resembled that of qirad and commenda arrangements.

The fall of the Mongol Empire led to the collapse of the political unity along the Silk Road. Also falling victim were the cultural and economic aspects of its unity. Turkic tribes seized the western end of the Silk Road from the decaying Byzantine Empire, and sowed the seeds of a Turkic culture that would later crystallize into the Ottoman Empire under the Sunni faith. Turkic–Mongol military bands in Iran, after some years of chaos were united under the Safavid tribe, under whom the modern Iranian nation took shape under the Shiite faith. Meanwhile, Mongol princes in Central Asia were content with Sunni orthodoxy with decentralized princedoms of the Chagatai, Timurid and Uzbek houses. In the Kypchak–Tatar zone, Mongol khanates all but crumbled under the assaults of the Black Death and the rising power of Muscovy. In the East, the native Chinese overthrew the Yuan dynasty in 1368, launching their own Ming dynasty and pursuing a policy of economic isolationism.

The introduction of gunpowder contributed to the fall of the Mongols, as previously conquered tribes used it to reassert their independence. Gunpowder had differing effects depending on the region. In Europe, gunpowder and early modernity lent to the integration of territorial states and increasing mercantilism. Along the Silk Road, it was quite the opposite: failure to maintain the level of integration of the Mongol Empire, and a resulting decline in trade, partially exacerbated by the increase in European maritime trade. By 1400, the Silk Road no longer served as a shipping route for silk.

=== Marco Polo's observations ===
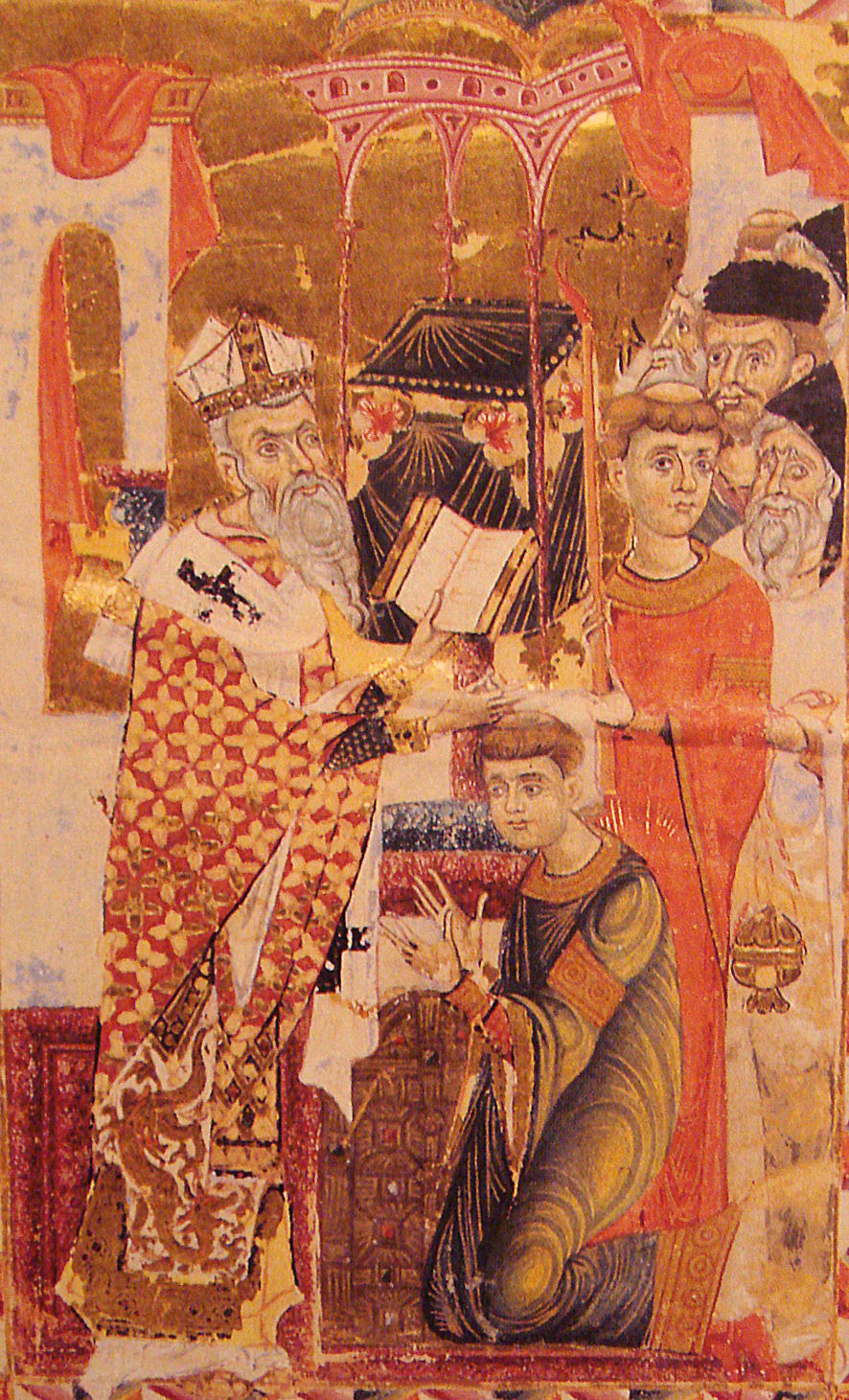
Archbishop John of Cilician Armenia, in a painting from 1287. His dress displays a Chinese dragon, an indication of the thriving exchanges with the Mongol Empire during the reign of Kublai Khan (1260–1294)

One of the most impressive discoveries that Marco Polo made on his visit to Mongolia is how the empire's monetary system worked. He was not impressed by the silver Akçe that the empire used for a unified currency, or that some realms of the empire still used local currency, but he was most surprised by the fact that in some parts of the empire the people used paper currency.

Marco Polo considered the use of paper currency in the Mongol Empire one of the marvels of the world. Paper currency was not used in the entire empire. The Chinese silver ingot was accepted universally as currency throughout the empire, while local coins were also used in some western areas, such as the modern day Iran. Paper currency was used in China, continuing the practice established by the Chinese several hundred years before. The Chinese had mastered the technology of printmaking and therefore it was relatively simple for them to print bills. Paper currency was used in China since 960 A.D., when the Song dynasty started replacing their copper coinage with paper currency. When the Mongols invaded Song China they started issuing their own Mongolian bills in 1227. This first attempt by the Mongols did not last long because the notes issued expired after several years and were inconsistent throughout the parts of the Mongol Empire that issued them. In 1260, Kublai Khan created the Yuan Mongol's first unified paper currency with notes that did not have any expiration date. To validate the currency, it was made fully exchangeable to silver and gold and was accepted as tax payments. Currency distribution was small at first, but the war against the southern Song dramatically increased circulation. With the defeat of the Song, their currency was taken out of circulation and could be exchanged with Mongol currency at a relatively high exchange rate. Regardless of persistent inflation after 1272, paper currency backed by limited releases of coins remained as the standard means of currency until 1345. Around 1345, rebellions, economic crisis, and financial mismanagement of paper currency destroyed the public's confidence in the bills.

To initiate the transition from other forms of compensation to paper currency the government made refusing to accept the bill punishable by death. To avoid devaluation, the penalty for forging or counterfeiting was also death.

=== Appanage system ===
Members of the Golden Kin (or Golden Family - Altan urag) were entitled to a share (khubi - хувь) of the benefits of each part of the Mongol Empire just as each Mongol noble and their family, as well as each warrior, was entitled to an appropriate measure of all the goods seized in war.

In 1206, Genghis Khan gave large lands with people as share to his family and loyal companions, of whom most were people of common origin. Shares of booty were distributed much more widely. Empresses, princesses and meritorious servants, as well as children of concubines, all received full shares including war prisoners. For example, Kublai called 2 siege engineers from the Ilkhanate in Middle East, then under the rule of his nephew Abaqa. After the Mongol conquest in 1238, the port cities in Crimea paid the Jochids custom duties and the revenues were divided among all Chingisid princes in Mongol Empire accordance with the appanage system. As loyal allies, the Kublaids in East Asia and the Ilkahnids in Persia sent clerics, doctors, artisans, scholars, engineers and administrators to and received revenues from the appanages in each other's khanates.

After Genghis Khan (1206–1227) distributed nomadic grounds and cities in Mongolia and North China to his mother Hoelun, youngest brother Temüge and other members and Chinese districts in Manchuria to his other brothers, Ögedei distributed shares in North China, Khorazm, Transoxiana to the Golden Family, imperial sons in law (khurgen-хүргэн) and notable generals in 1232–1236. Great Khan Möngke divided up shares or appanages in Persia and made redistribution in Central Asia in 1251–1256. Although Chagatai Khanate was the smallest in its size, Chagatai Khans owned Kat and Khiva towns in Khorazm, few cities and villages in Shanxi and Iran in spite of their nomadic grounds in Central Asia. First Ilkhan Hulagu owned 25,000 households of silk-workers in China, valleys in Tibet as well as pastures, animals, men in Mongolia. His descendant Ghazan of Persia sent envoys with precious gifts to Temür Khan of Yuan dynasty to request his great-grandfather's shares in Great Yuan in 1298. It is claimed that Ghazan received his shares that were not sent since the time of Möngke Khan.

Mongol and non-Mongol appanage holders demanded excessive revenues and freed themselves from taxes. Ögedei decreed that nobles could appoint darughachi and judges in the appanages instead direct distribution without the permission of Great Khan thanks to genius Khitan minister Yelu Chucai. Kublai Khan continued Ögedei's regulations somehow, however, both Güyük and Möngke restricted the autonomy of the appanages before. Ghazan also prohibited any misfeasance of appanage holders in Ilkhanate and Yuan councillor Temuder restricted Mongol nobles' excessive rights on the appanages in China and Mongolia. Kublai's successor and Khagan Temür abolished imperial son-in-law Goryeo King Chungnyeol's 358 departments which caused financial pressures to the Korean people, whose country was under the control of the Mongols.

The appanage system was severely affected beginning with the civil strife in the Mongol Empire in 1260–1304. Nevertheless, this system survived. For example, Abaqa of the Ilkhanate allowed Möngke Temür of the Golden Horde to collect revenues from silk workshops in northern Persia in 1270 and Baraq of the Chagatai Khanate sent his Muslim vizier to Ilkhanate, ostensibly to investigate his appanages there (The vizier's main mission was to spy on the Ilkhanids in fact) in 1269. After a peace treaty declared among Mongol Khans: Temür, Duwa, Chapar, Tokhta, and Oljeitu in 1304, the system began to see a recovery. During the reign of Tugh Temür, Yuan court received a third of revenues of the cities of Transoxiana under Chagatai Khans while Chagatai elites such as Eljigidey, Duwa Temür, Tarmashirin were given lavish presents and sharing in the Yuan dynasty's patronage of Buddhist temples. Tugh Temür was also given some Russian captives by Chagatai prince Changshi as well as Kublai's future khatun Chabi had servant Ahmad Fanakati from Fergana Valley before her marriage. In 1326, Golden Horde started sending tributes to Great Khans of Yuan dynasty again. By 1339, Ozbeg and his successors had received annually 24 thousand ding in paper currency from their Chinese appanages in Shanxi, Cheli, and Hunan. H. H. Howorth noted that Ozbeg's envoy required his master's shares from the Yuan court, the headquarters of the Mongol world, for the establishment of new post stations in 1336. This communication ceased only with the breakup, succession struggles and rebellions of Mongol Khanates. (Note: Ilkhanate broke up in 1335; the succession struggles of the Golden Horde and the Chagatai Khanate started in 1359 and 1340 respectively; the Yuan army fought against the Red Turban Rebellion since the 1350s.)

== Domestic animals in the Mongol Empire ==
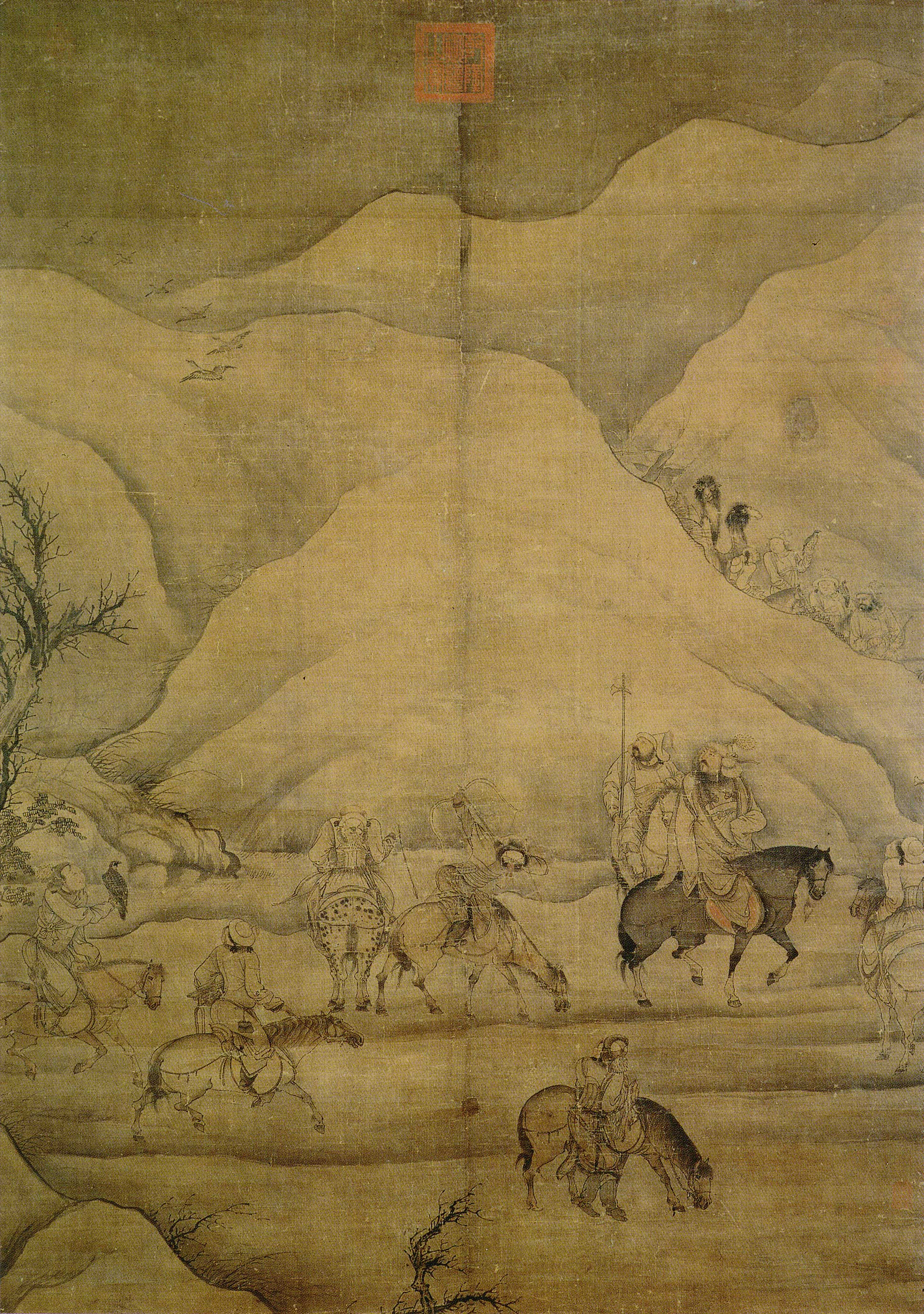
"Hunting Wild Geese" (射雁圖), Hanging scroll with ink and colors, by Anonymous, Yuan dynasty (1271–1368). This painting depicts a hunting party on a path surrounded by mountains. The leader of the party appears to be Temür Khan. The Yuan emperors enjoyed hunting and ordered artists to do related paintings on many occasions to record their trips.

The five domestic animals most important in the Mongol Empire were horses (most important), cattle, camels, sheep, and goats. All of these animals were valued for their milk and all of the animals’ hides were used for clothing and shelter. Though often considered unattractive by other cultures, Mongolian domestic animals were well adapted to cold weather as well as shortages of food and water. These animals were and still are known to survive under these conditions while animals from other regions perish.

=== Horses ===
Horses were by far the most important animal to the ancient Mongols. Not only were they fairly self-sufficient, but they were hardy and fast. Smaller than most, these animals could travel long distances without fatigue. They were also well adapted to the harsh winters and dug through the snow looking for grass to feed off of. Almost every family possessed at least one horse, and in some cases, horses were buried with their owners to serve with them in the next life. Mongolian horses were probably the most important factor of the Mongol Empire. Without the extremely skilled, not to mention famous, cavalry, the Mongols would not have been able to raid and capture the huge area they did and the Mongols would not be known, even today, as skilled horsemen. It also served as an animal that Mongols could drink blood from, by cutting into a vein in the neck and drinking it, especially on harsh, long rides from place to place. For additional sustenance, horse mare's milk was made into an alcoholic beverage, known as airag. Horses allowed the Mongols to travel over twenty kilometers per hour (12 miles per hour) which was great for ancient times.

=== Cattle ===
Cattle were used mainly as beasts of burden but they were also valued for their milk, though not as much so for their meat. They lived on the open range and were fairly easy to maintain. They were released early in the morning to graze without a herder or overseer and wandered back on their own in the afternoon. Though they were a part of the domestic animal population, they were not that common in the early empire. In the early time period, only nine percent of all domestic animals were cattle.

=== Camels ===
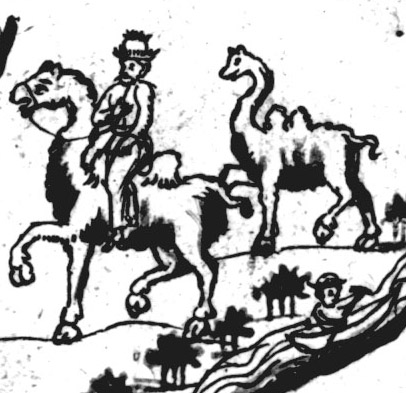
Kalmucks and Mongols riding camels over the Great Steppe

Camels, along with cattle, were also used as beasts of burden. As they were domesticated (between 4000 and 3000 BC), they became one of the most important animals for land based trade in Asia. The reasons for this were that they did not require roads to travel on, they could carry up to 500 pounds of goods and supplies, and they did not require much water for long journeys. Besides being beasts of burden, camels’ hair was used as a main fiber in Mongolian textiles.

=== Sheep/goats ===
Sheep and goats were most valued for their milk, meat, and wool. The wool of sheep in particular was very valuable. The shearing was usually done in the spring before the herds were moved to mountain pastures. Most importantly, it was used for making felt to insulate Mongolian homes, called gers, however it was also used for rugs, saddle blankets, and clothing. Ideal herd numbers were usually about 1,000. To reach this quota, groups of people would combine their herds and travel together with their sheep and goats.

== Traditional Mongolian clothing ==
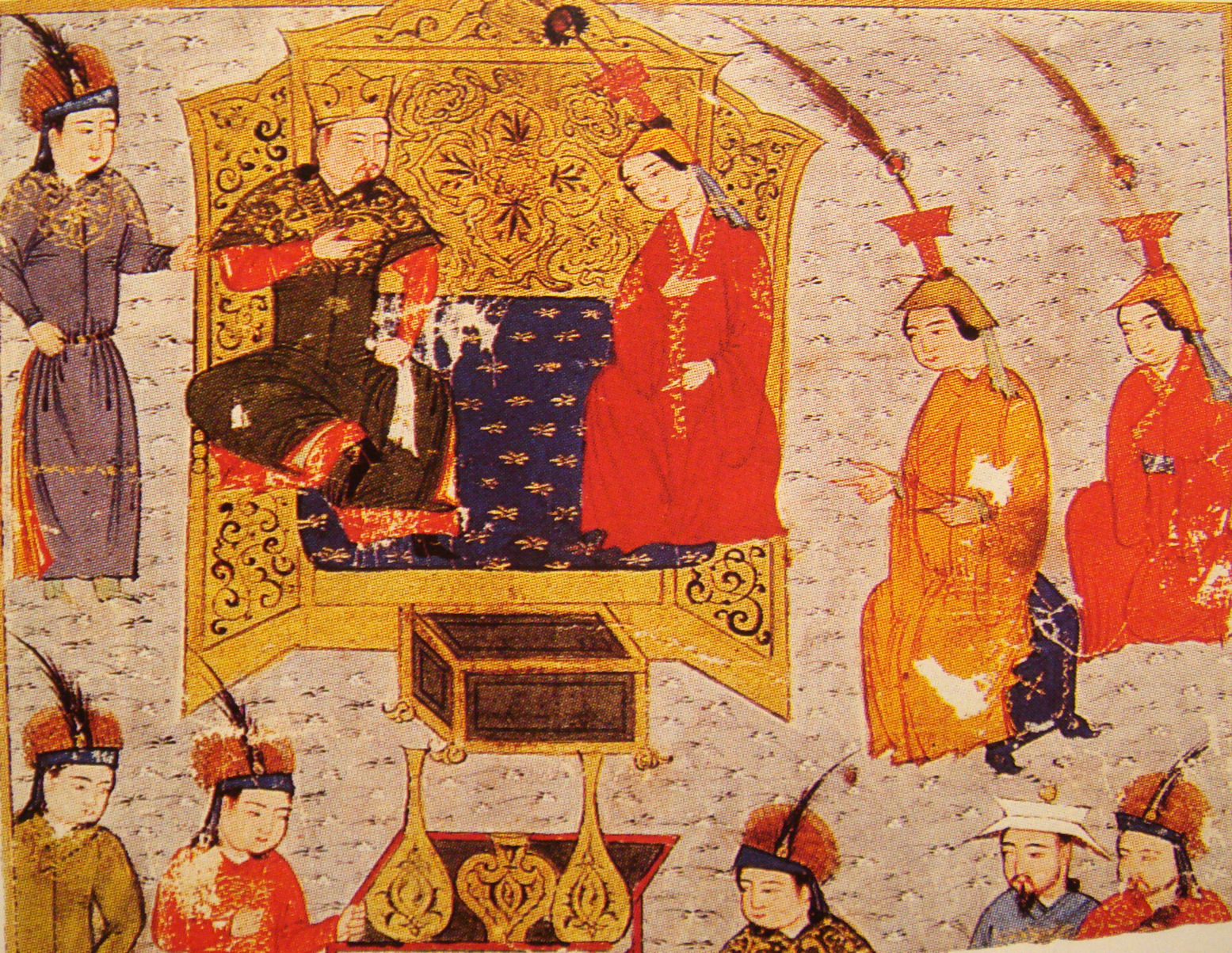
Clothing of the Mongol nobles.

During the Mongol Empire, there was a uniform type of Mongol dress though variations according to wealth, status, and gender did occur. These differences included the design, colour, cut, and elaborateness of the outfit. The first layer consisted of a long, ankle length robe called a caftan. Some caftans had a square collar but the majority overlapped in the front to fasten under the arm creating a slanting collar. The skirt of the caftan was sewn on separately, and sometimes ruffles were added depending on the purpose and class of the person wearing it. Men and unmarried women tied their caftans with two belts, one thin, leather one beneath a large, broad sash that covered the stomach. Once a woman became married, she stopped wearing the sash. Instead she wore a very full caftan and some had a short-sleeved jacket that opened in the front. For women of higher rank, the overlapping collar of their caftan was decorated with elaborate brocade and they wore full sleeves and a train that servants had to carry. For both genders, trousers were worn under the caftan probably because of the nomadic traditions of the Mongol people.

The materials used to create caftans varied according to status and wealth. They ranged anywhere from silk, brocade, cotton, and valuable furs for richer groups, to leather, wool, and felt for those less well off. Season also dictated the type of fabric worn, especially for those that could afford it. In the summer, Middle Eastern silk and brocades were favored whereas in the winter furs were used to add additional warmth.

Color was an important characteristic of clothing because it had symbolic meaning. During large festivities held by the Khan, he would give his important diplomats special robes to wear with specific colors according to what was being celebrated. These were worn only during the specific festival, and if one was caught wearing it at other times, punishments were extremely severe, as were the rules during the time of Khubilai Khan.

The footwear of the traditional Mongol Empire consisted mainly of boots or leather sandals made out of cow fur. This footwear was thick and often smelled of cow dung. Both the left foot and the right foot were identical and they were made of leather, cotton, or silk. Many layers were sewn together to create the sole of the boot then separately made uppers were attached. The upper sections of the boots were usually dark in colour and the soles were light. Light strips of fabric were sewn over the seams to make them more durable. Boots usually had a pointed or upturned toe but lacked a heel.

== Kinship and family life ==
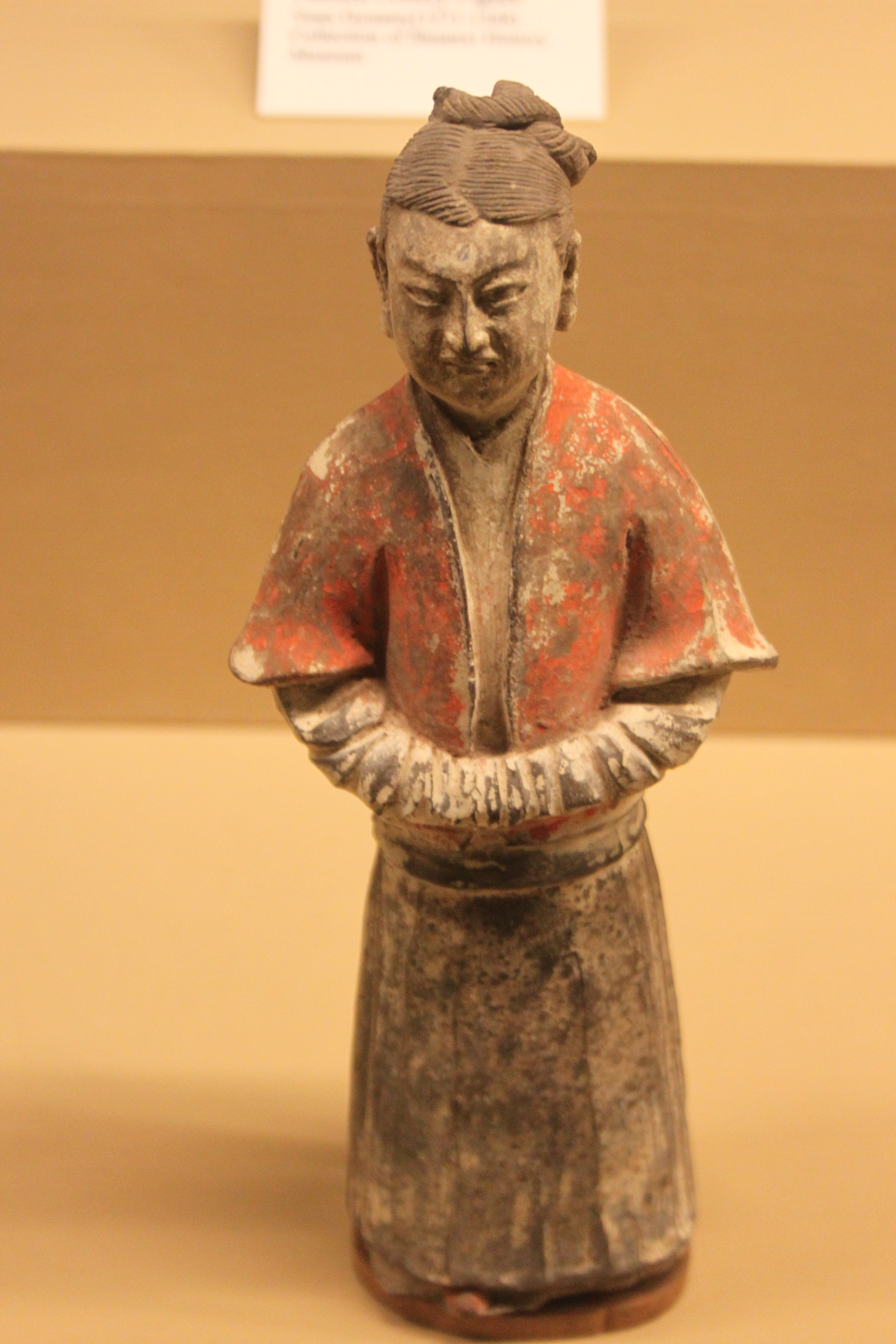
Female tomb figurine, Yuan dynasty

The traditional Mongol family was patriarchal, patrilineal, and patrilocal. Wives were brought for each of the sons, while daughters were married off to other clans. Wife-taking clans stood in a relation of inferiority to wife-giving clans. Thus wife-giving clans were considered "elder" or "bigger" in relation to wife-taking clans, who were considered "younger" or "smaller". This distinction, symbolized in terms of "elder" and "younger" or "bigger" and "smaller", was carried into the clan and family as well, and all members of a lineage were terminologically distinguished by generation and age, with senior superior to junior.

In the traditional Mongolian family, each son received a part of the family herd as he married, with the elder son receiving more than the younger son. The youngest son would remain in the parental tent caring for his parents, and after their death he would inherit the parental tent in addition to his own part of the herd. This inheritance system was mandated by law codes such as the Yassa, created by Genghis Khan. Likewise, each son inherited a part of the family's camping lands and pastures, with the elder son receiving more than the younger son. The eldest son inherited the farthest camping lands and pastures, and each son in turn inherited camping lands and pastures closer to the family tent until the youngest son inherited the camping lands and pastures immediately surrounding the family tent. Family units would often remain near each other and in close cooperation, though extended families would inevitably break up after a few generations. It is probable that the Yasa simply put into written law the principles of customary law. Nilgün Dalkesen wrote in Gender Roles and Women's Status in Central Asia and Anatolia between the Thirteenth and Sixteenth Centuries: "It is apparent that in many cases, for example in family instructions, the yasa tacitly accepted the principles of customary law and avoided any interference with them. For example, Riasanovsky said that killing the man or the woman in case of adultery is a good illustration. Yasa permitted the institutions of polygamy and concubinage so characteristic of southerly nomadic peoples. Children born of concubines were legitimate. Seniority of children derived their status from their mother. Eldest son received more than the youngest after the death of father. But the latter inherited the household of the father. Children of concubines also received a share in the inheritance, in accordance with the instructions of their father (or with custom)"

After the family, the next largest social units were the subclan and clan. These units were derived from groups claiming patrilineal descent from a common ancestor, ranked in order of seniority (the "conical clan"). By the Chingissid era, this ranking was symbolically expressed at formal feasts, in which tribal chieftains were seated and received particular portions of the slaughtered animal according to their status. The lineage structure of Central Asia had three different modes. It was organized on the basis of genealogical distance, or the proximity of individuals to one another on a graph of kinship; generational distance, or the rank of generation in relation to a common ancestor, and birth order, the rank of brothers in relation to each another. The paternal descent lines were collaterally ranked according to the birth of their founders, and were thus considered senior and junior to each other. Of the various collateral patrilines, the senior in order of descent from the founding ancestor, the line of eldest sons, was the most noble. In the steppe, no one had his exact equal; everyone found his place in a system of collaterally ranked lines of descent from a common ancestor. It was according to this idiom of superiority and inferiority of lineages derived from birth order that legal claims to superior rank were couched.

Mongol kinship is one of a particular patrilineal type classed as Omaha kinship, in which relatives are grouped together under separate terms that crosscut generations, age, and even sexual difference. Thus, a man's father's sister's children, his sister's children, and his daughter's children are all called by another term. A further attribute is strict terminological differentiation of siblings according to seniority.

The division of Mongolian society into senior elite lineages and subordinate junior lineages was waning by the nineteenth century. During the 1920s, the communist regime was established. The remnants of the Mongolian aristocracy fought alongside the Japanese and against Chinese, Soviets, and communist Mongolians during World War II, but were defeated. There are some people today, though, who claim descent from the Mongol aristocracy.

The anthropologist Herbert Harold Vreeland visited three Mongol communities in 1920 and published a highly detailed book with the results of his field work, "Mongol community and kinship structure", now publicly available.

== Religion ==
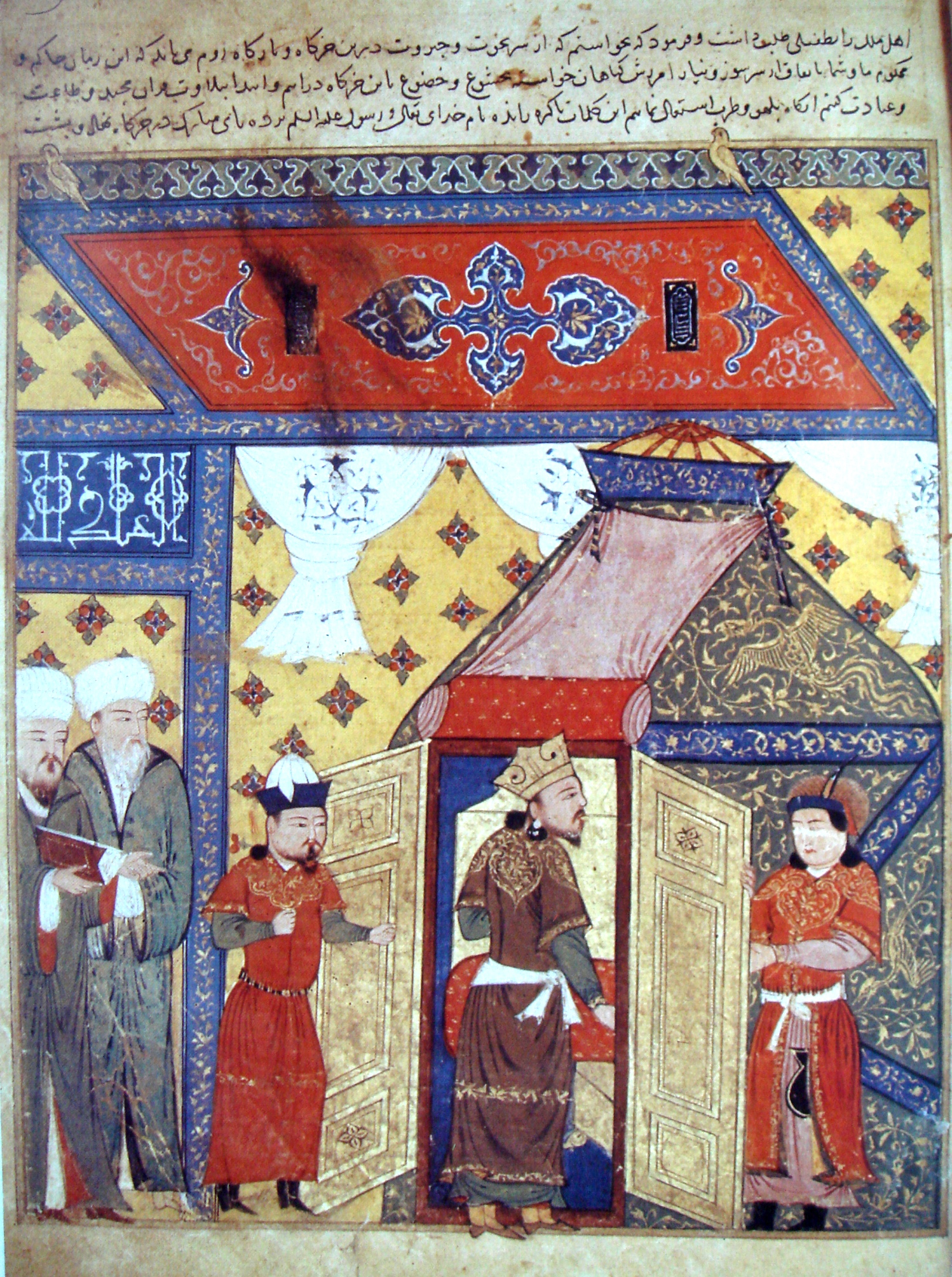
Persian miniature showing Ghazan's conversion from Buddhism to Islam

The Mongols were tolerant of most religions during the early empire, and typically sponsored several at the same time. At the time of Genghis Khan in the 13th century, virtually every religion had found converts, from Buddhism to Eastern Christianity and Manichaeanism to Islam. To avoid strife, Genghis Khan set up an institution that ensured complete religious freedom, though he himself was a Tengrist. Under his administration, all religious leaders were exempt from taxation, and from public service. Mongol emperors were known for organizing competitions of religious debates among clerics, and these would draw large audiences.

Genghis Khan's decree exempting Buddhists (toyin), Christians (erke'üd), Taoists (xiansheng) and Muslims (dashmad) from tax duties were continued by his successors until the end of the Yuan dynasty in 1368. According to Atwood, all the decrees use the same formula and stated that Genghis Khan first gave the decree of exemption. A well preserved example is found in Kublai Khan's 1261 decree in Mongolian appointing the elder of the Shaolin Monastery. (Note: Genghis Khan's tax exemption decree for religions reads: "Činggis qan-u jrlg-tur toyid erkegü:d šingšingü:d dašmad aliba alba gubčiri ülü üjen tngri-yi jalbariju bidan-a irüge:r ögün atugai keme:gsen jrlg-un yosuga:r... ene Šaolim janglau-da bariju yabuga:i jrlg ögbei" (According to the decree of Genghis Khan which says may the Buddhists, Christians, Taoists and Muslims be exempt from all taxation and may they pray to God and continue offering us blessings... I have given this decree to the Shaolin elder to carry it.)) In the Mongol Empire, Buddhist, Christian, Confucian, Daoist, and Muslim priests, monks and scholars (later Jewish clergy) were initially exempted from all kinds of taxes and forced labor. However, in 1264 Khublai imposed only commercial and land taxes to the clergy engaged in trade and agriculture in China, and in 1342 Jani Beg temporarily levied a tax on the Orthodox Christian Church in Russia for a short period before restoring the Church's tax exempt status in 1347.

According to Juvaini, Genghis Khan allowed religious freedom to Muslims during his conquest of Khwarezmia "permitting the recitation of the takbir and the azan". However, Rashid-al-Din states there were occasions when Genghis Khan forbade Halal butchering. Kublai Khan revived the decree in 1280 after Muslims refused to eat at a banquet. He forbade Halal butchering and circumcision. The decree of Kublai Khan was revoked after a decade. Genghis Khan met Wahid-ud-Din in Afghanistan in 1221 and asked him if the Islamic prophet Muhammad predicted a Mongol conqueror. He was initially pleased with Wahid-ud-Din but then dismissed him from his service, as he rebuked Genghis Khan's large scale massacres, saying "I used to consider you a wise and prudent man, but from this speech of yours, it has become evident to me that you do not possess complete understanding and that your comprehension is but small".

Initially, there were few normal places of worship, because of the nomadic lifestyle. However, under Genghis's successor Ögedei, several building projects were undertaken in the Mongol capital of Karakorum. Along with palaces, Ögedei built houses of worship for the Buddhist, Muslim, Christian, and Taoist followers. The dominant religions at that time were Tengrism and Buddhism, although Ögedei's wife was a Christian. In later years of the empire, three of the four principal khanates embraced Islam, as Islam was favored over other religions. The Yuan dynasty mainly adopted Tibetan Buddhism while there were other religions practiced in the east of the Mongol Empire.

== Women of the Mongol Empire ==
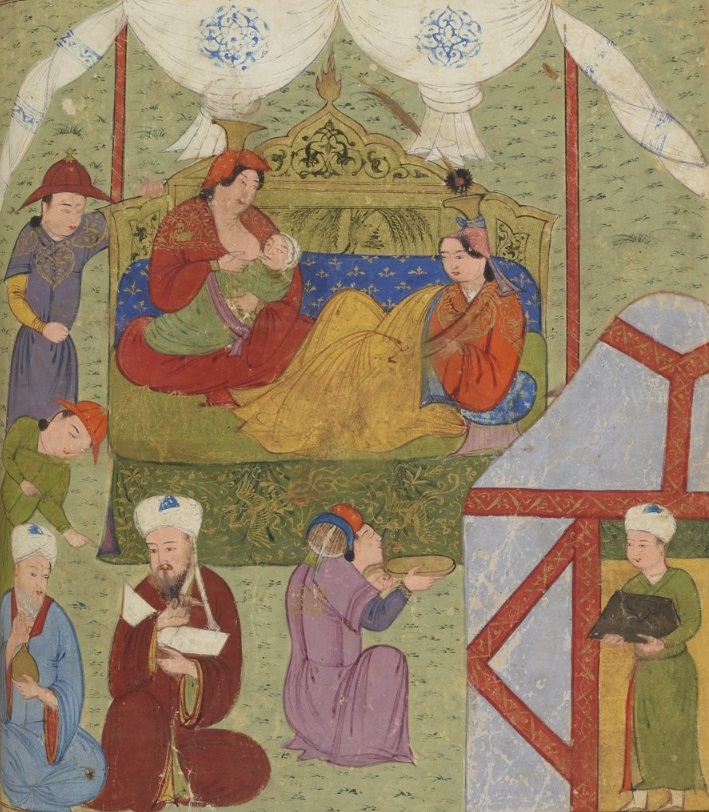
Arghun's wife was Buluqhan Khatun, who gave birth to Ghazan (here being breastfed). Rashid al-Din, early 14th century.

Compared to other civilizations, Mongolian women had the power to influence society and enjoyed much more freedom in general. Even though men were dominant in society, many turned to women in their lives for advice. While developing organizations within the Mongol Empire, Genghis Khan asked for assistance from his mother. He honored the advice women in his life offered. Genghis Khan permitted his wives to sit with him and encouraged them to voice their opinions. Because of their help, Genghis was able to choose his successor. Furthermore, Mongol women were riding horseback, they fought in battles, tended their herds and influenced their men on important decisions for the Mongolian Empire.

Before a marriage could proceed, the bride's family was required to offer "a dowry of clothing or household ornaments" to the groom's mother. To avoid paying the dowry, families could exchange daughters or the groom could work for his future father-in-law. Once the dowry was settled, the bride's family presented her with an inheritance of livestock or servants. Typically, married women of the Mongol Empire wore headdresses to distinguish themselves from the unmarried women. It is claimed that the Yassa/Zasag prohibited trade in women.

Marriages in the Mongol Empire were arranged, however Genghis Khan's later nokoger (literally "women friends" but seen as wives usually and later) and those of his officers were not ever paid for with any bride price, but men were permitted to practice polygamy. Since each wife had their own yurt, the husband had the opportunity to choose where he wanted to sleep each night. Visitors to this region found it remarkable that marital complications did not arise. The location of the yurts between the wives differed depending on who married first. The first wife placed her yurt to the east and the other wives placed their yurts to the west. Even though a husband remained attached to his first wife, the women were "docile, diligent, and lacked jealousy" towards one another.

After the husband had slept with one of his wives, the others congregated in her yurt to share drinks with the couple. The wives of the Mongol Empire were not bothered by the presence of the other women in their household. As a married woman, she displayed her "maturity and independence from her father" to society. The women devoted their lives to their daily tasks, which included physical work outside the household. Women worked by loading the yurts, herding and milking all the livestock, and making felt for the yurt. Along with these chores, they were expected to cook and sew for their husband, their children, and their elders.

A wife's devotion to her husband continued after his death. Remarriages during the Mongol Empire did not occur often. Instead, her youngest son or her youngest brother took care of her. However, Genghis Khan had allowed remarriage of widows including the levirate.

== Mongol dwellings ==
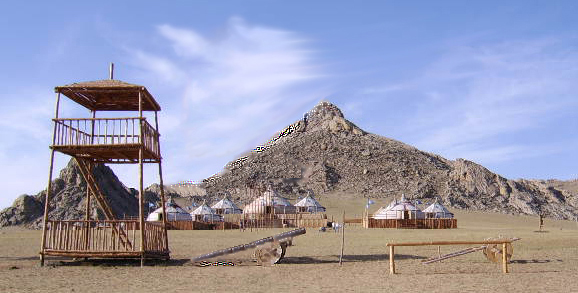
A reconstruction of an ancient Mongol camp, located near the Genghis Khan Equestrian Statue

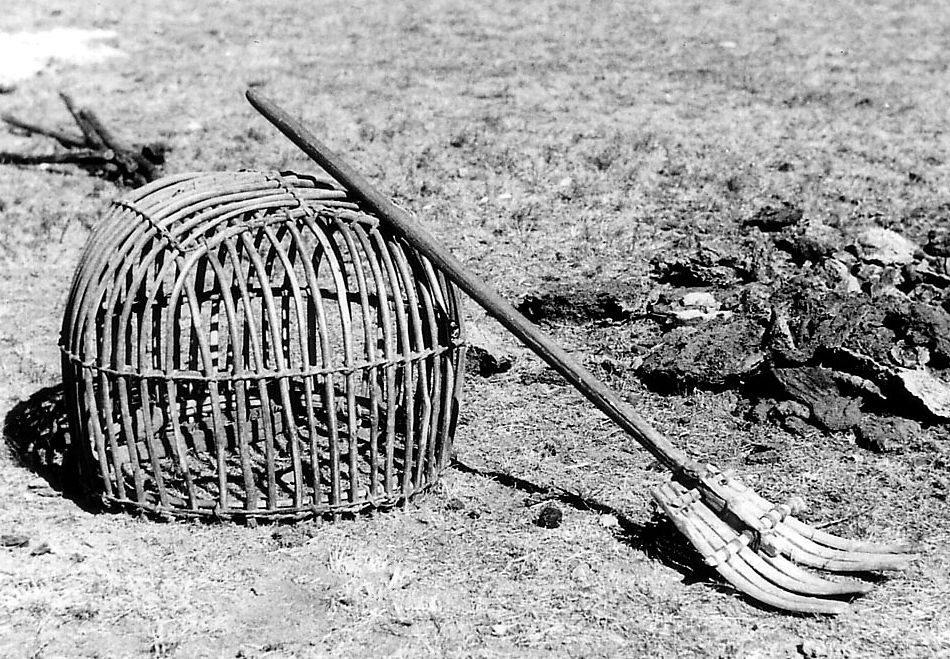
Basket and fork for gathering the dung (used as fuel in the yurts), Sükhbaatar Aimag, Mongolia, 1972

Mongols have been living in virtually the same dwellings since at least the 6th century AD. These dwellings are called gers, and during the Mongol Empire they consisted of a round, collapsible wooden frame covered in felt. The roof was formed from about 80 wooden rods attached at one end to the wall frame and at the other to an iron ring in the center, providing a sturdy base for the felt roof. Without the roof in place, this frame would have resembled a large wooden wheel with the wooden spokes converging at the iron ring. The top of the roof was usually about five feet higher than the walls so precipitation would run to the ground. The ring at the peak of the yurt could be left open as a vent for smoke and a window for sunlight, or it could be closed with a piece of felt. Doors were made from a felt flap or, for richer families, out of wood.

The Turkish word for ger, "yurt", means "homeland" in Turkish and it was probably never used to describe the tent. When the dwelling made its way to Mongolia, it adopted the name "ger" which means "home" in Mongolian. They were always set up with the door facing the south and tended to have an altar across from the door whether the inhabitant were Buddhist or shamanist. The floors were dirt, but richer families were able to cover the floors with felt rugs. Sometimes beds were used, but most people slept on the floor between hides, around the fire pit that was in the center of the dwelling.

The first known yurt was seen engraved on a bronze bowl that was found in the Zagros Mountains of southern Iran, dating back to 600 BC, but the felt tent probably did not arrive in Mongolia for another thousand years. When the yurt did arrive, however, it quickly came into widespread use because of its ability to act in concert with the nomadic lifestyle of the Mongols. Most of the Mongol people were herders and moved constantly from southern regions in the winter months to the northern steppes in summer as well as moving periodically to fresh pastures. The yurts' size and the felt walls made them relatively cool in the summers and warm in the winters allowing the Mongols to live in the same dwelling year-round. Disassembling the yurts only took about an hour, as did putting them back up in a new location. This is why there are still some doubts today about the assumption that the yurts have ever been really put on carts pulled by oxen for transporting them from camp to camp, without disassembling them, or if these carts are just a legend. Some travelers, like Marco Polo, did mention them in their writings: "They [the Mongols] have circular houses made of wood and covered with felt, which they carry about with them on four wheeled wagons wherever they go. For the framework of rods is so neatly constructed that it is light to carry." (Polo, 97) Yurts could be heated with dried dung, found in abundance with the traveling herds, so no timber was needed. The felt for the covering was made from wool that was taken from sheep also present in most Mongol herds. The wooden frame was handed down from one generation to the next and seldom had to be replaced.

Today, yurts follow the same basic design though they are usually covered in canvas, use an iron stove and stovepipe, and use a collapsible lattice work frame for the walls. They are still used in parts of rural China, central Mongolia, and by the Kyrgyz of Kyrgyzstan.

== See also ==
- Religion in the Mongol Empire
