= Abd-ur-Rahman =

13th-century Muslim administrator

- عبد الرحمن
- Head tax collector of northern China: 1240–1241
- Yeke darughachi of northern China: 1241–1246

Personal details
- Died: 1246

Abd-ur-Rahman (Arabic: عبد الرحمن; died 1246) was a controversial Persian Muslim administrator in the Mongol Empire who ruled over northern China.

== Early life ==
Abd-ur-Rahman is believed to be a Persian Muslims from the Khwarazmian Empire. It has also been suggested that he was an Uyghur.

Rahman first appears in history as a tax farmer and ortogh merchant.

== History ==
=== Reign of Ögedei ===
Abd-ur-Rahman began under the reign of Ögedei Khan as a tax collector. In 1239, Ögedei appointed him as head tax collector for northern China, serving under the administration of Mahmud Yalavach. His appointment was supported by Ögedei's wife, Töregene Khatun. In 1240, his powers were expanded. As head tax collector, Rahman promised to double the annual payments of silver. Rahman was demoted in the autumn of 1941, shortly before Ögedei's death, but he remained in the royal court.

Following Ögedei's death from alcoholism in December 1241, Chinese officials initially blamed Rahman for the grape wine which had been donated by him. However, Abd-ur-Rahman was absolved of this when it was recognized that Ögedei's alcoholism was the true cause of his death. However, he is still considered to have enabled Ögedei's alcoholism, as he was a frequent drinking partner of Ögedei's.

=== Reign of Töregene ===
Following Töregene becoming regent and khatun in 1241, under the advice of Fatima Khatun, she replaced Mahmud Yalavach and Yelü Chucai in the role of administrator of northern China with Abd-ur-Rahman. Yang Huaizhong, a Chinese official, was also given a promotion at this time. Rahman had accused Chucai of being too lenient, saying that he could better manage the region for profit. Under Chucai, the profit from northern china had been around 500,000 ounces of silver, rising to 1,100,000 after the conquest of Henan. Rahman suggested that he could raise the total to 2,200,000 ounces of silver.

Rahman's time as administrator of northern China is viewed negatively, with a lack of accountability and a frenzied demand for revenue. He held centralized power, which he used to sell the right to tax regions. He also gave loans in a manner which has earned him comparisons to loan sharks. Peasants were taxed highly, then offered loans to pay those taxes, which then trapped them in debt. This had the effect of causing peasants to flee their homes to escape taxes and debt. His tax farming policies succeeded in their goal of raising significant amounts of money for the Mongol officials, but it had ruinous effects for the sedentary populations of northern China. This earned him favor for the efficiency of his work among the royal court.

=== Reign of Güyük ===
After Töregene's son, Güyük Khan, was elected khan in 1246, he began to purge his mother's court officials. Fatima Khatun was executed, while Rahman, who she had put in power, was deposed and later executed. Rahman had been unpopular for his taxation policies, particularly among the Golden Horde. Following his death, Yalavach was restored to the role of administrator of northern China. However, the fallout from Rahman's policies, both in China and within the court, would take another 20 years to recover from.
