= Chinqai =

Mongol Empire statesman (c. 1169 – 1252)

Chinqai (Chinese: 鎮海, c. 1169 – 1252), also known by his Sinicized name Tian Zhenhai (Chinese: 田鎮海), was a Mongol statesman, scholar and politician in early Mongol Empire. He was a Nestorian and his ethnic origin was Kereit according to the History of Yuan, Uyghur according to Ata Malik Juvayni's Tarīkh-i Jahān-gushā (History of the World Conqueror), though some also argued that he could be an Öngüd.

== Biography ==
He was born c. 1169. His exact birthplace is unknown. He probably started his life as a merchant and a spy working for Temüjin. He participated in Battle of Khalakhaljid Sands and was part of Baljuna Covenant in 1203 and was later promoted to be ja'un commander and participated in the election of Genghis Khan in 1206. He was promoted to be cherbi (chamberlain) of kheshig in 1212. Simultaneously, he also became imperial yarguchi (arbitrator) assisting Shigi Qutuqu. He participated in Battle of Zhongdu and was awarded by the khan with lands in 1215.

He established his own city sometime before 1221 called Chinqai Balgasun (Chinese: 鎮海城; pinyin: Zhènhǎichéng) (located near modern Sharga, Mongolia) composed of mostly artisans and captives under the order of the khan. Later he was tasked with taking Qiu Chuji to meet Genghis Khan and take him to khan's court.

He remained in service during reign of Ögedei Khan and was tasked with cataloging Jin dynasty treasure and assets. He was keeper of the khan's seal and was overseeing reforms of Yelü Chucai. Song dynasty official Xu Ting (徐霆) observed that Chinqai opted for writing documents in Uyghur script, so Chucai couldn't send any document without Chinqai first seeing it. He supported Korguz for the post of darughachi of Khorasan and protected him against his political rivals in 1236. Following the death of Ögedei in 1241, Chinqai was shunned by new, traditionalist regent Töregene, thus forced to flee to her second son Köden together with Mahmud Yalavach.

He was able to resume his duties in 1246, following the accession of Güyük Khan. Güyük appointed him Right Minister of Central Secretariat. He met Giovanni da Pian del Carpine same year and participated in writing the letter of khan to Pope. However, khan died 2 years later and was succeeded by Oghul Qaimish, who was the regent. Köden's death in 1251 further stripped him from a protector. However, Chinqai was a victim to a purge by Möngke Khan, who executed a lot of Ögedeid and Chagataid rivals. He was executed due to wishes of Danishmand Hajib at the age of 83.

== Family ==
He had two wives, both were given to him by khans. His first wife was granted to him by Genghis Khan, second one was a Jürchen princess given by Ögedei in 1234. He had at least 10 children, including eldest son Yashmut who became a yarguchi like his father. Others were named Joseph, Bacchus and George.

== Notes ==
1. Jaghun was a military unit of a hundred men

== Sources ==
- Rachewiltz, Igor de; Chan, Hok-lam; Xiao, Qiqing; Geier, Peter Walter, eds. (1993). In the service of the Khan: eminent personalities of the early Mongol-Yüan period (1200 - 1300) (Nachdruck ed.). Wiesbaden: Harrassowitz. ISBN 978-3-447-03339-8.
