= Töregene Khatun =

Regent of the Mongol Empire from 1242 to 1246

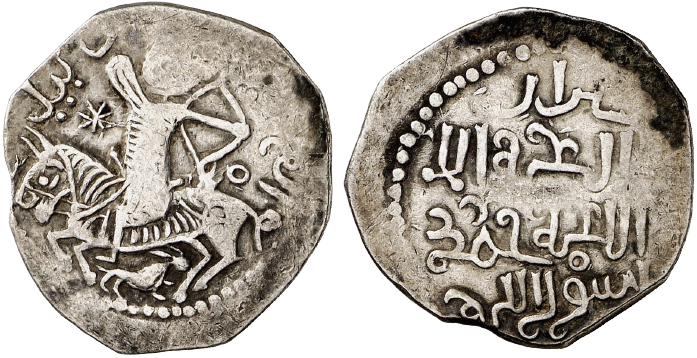
- A coin struck in Caucasia during the reign of Töregene Khatun

Regent of the Mongol Empire
- Regency: 1242–1246
- Predecessor: Ögedei
- Successor: Güyük

Khatun of Mongols
- Tenure: 1241–1246
- Predecessor: Möge Khatun
- Successor: Oghul Qaimish
- Died: 1246
- Spouse: Dayir Usun; Ögedei
- Issue: Güyük; Godan Khan
Posthumous name
- Empress Zhaoci (昭慈皇后)
- House: Naiman (by birth); Borjigin (by marriage)

Töregene Khatun (Note: sometimes spelled Törägänä or Doregene) (also Turakina (Note: Mongolian: ᠲᠦᠷᠭᠡᠨ᠎ᠡ, Дөргэнэ) and Nai-ma-chen; died 1246) was the Great Khatun and regent of the Mongol Empire from the death of her husband Ögedei Khan in 1241 until the election of her eldest son Güyük Khan in 1246.

Many of Töregene's retroactive descriptions come from Chinese sources, such as the History of Yuan, and Persian sources, such as those written by Minhaj-i Siraj Juzjani and Rashid al-Din Hamadan, take a negative stance on her reign. Töregene is seen as a smart ruler, but one who was overly vengeful and too unwilling to work with Mongol nobility. However, this characterization has been challenged as political in nature due to 13th and 14th century politics. Retroactive characterizations have emphasized Töregene's success in an era where women were given few opportunities to be global leaders.

== Background ==
Töregene was born into the Naimans. Her first husband was a Merkit. Some sources state that his name was Qudu (d. 1217), son of Toqto'a Beki of the Merkits. However, Rashid al-Din Hamadani named her first husband as Dayir Usun, a Merkit chief. Whatever the case, Töregene's first husband was slaughtered along with the other Merkit men.

When Genghis conquered the Merkit in 1204, he gave Töregene to Ögedei as his second wife. While Ögedei's first wife, Boraqchin, had no sons, Töregene gave birth to five sons, Güyük, Kötän, Köchü, Qarachar, and Qashi (father of Kaidu).

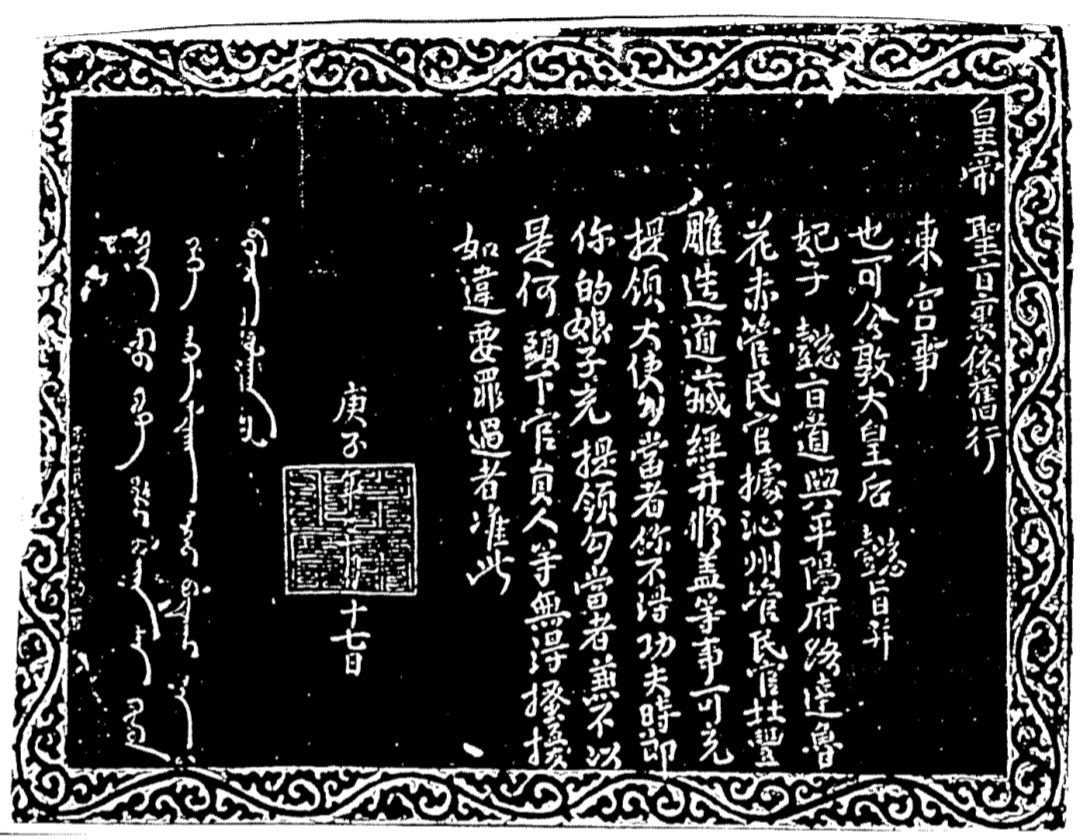
Bilingual Middle Chinese–Middle Mongol inscription of Töregene, supporting the reprinting of the Daozang, dated Year of the Rat (1240).

She eclipsed all of Ögedei's other wives and gradually increased her influence among the court officials. But Töregene still resented Ögedei's officials and the policy of centralizing the administration and lowering tax burdens. Through the influence of Töregene, Ögedei appointed Abd-ur-Rahman as tax collector in China. Töregene met Abd-ur-Rahman through his business as an ortogh. Ögedei was a frequent drunk, so during times he was incapacitated, Töregene would rule in his place.

During the reign of Ögedei, a rumor emerged among the Oirats that Ögedei was planning to have all the young women in the tribe married off to other tribes. To avoid this, Oirati families begin establishing marriage contracts. However, when Ögedei learned of this, he issued an order saying that all girls in the tribe aged seven or older should be lined up. From them, he selected the most beautiful and took them back to his palace, where he married them off or made them work as prostitutes. Others were allowed to be taken by Mongol troops. According Ögedei, this idea was Töregene's own.

== Great Khatun of the Mongol Empire ==
Soon after Ögedei died in 1241, power passed initially to Möge Khatun, one of Ögedei's widows and formerly one of Genghis Khan's wives. Following Möge's death in 1242, power was supposed to pass to Shiremun, the grandson of Ögedei. However, Töregene campaigned for Güyük to become khan, but he initially refused, wanting instead to gather support from among the other Mongol princes before the kurultai. Because of this, power was left in the hands of Töregene. With the support of Chagatai and her sons, and with Batu Khan excusing himself from the court, Töregene assumed complete power as regent in spring 1242 as Great Khatun. Batu sent several princes from Kievan Rus' in his place.

Between 1240-44, Töregene sponsored a block printing of the entire Taoist canon, despite not being a Taoist herself. Töregene also had Christian holy books printed. This came at the same time that Christian kings were swearing loyalty to the Mongol empire, such as Hethum II, king of Cilician Armenia, who hoped that she would support him in his attempt to conquer Jerusalem.

When Barchuq Art Tegin's son, Kišmain, died, Totegene appointed Salendi, her brother, to be the head of Qocho. As ruler, Salendi, who was a Buddhist, was controversial. Early into his rule, he was accused of planning to slaughter Uyghur Muslims. He was put to trial and it was judged that he had indeed planned such a thing. As a result, he was executed.

As a regent, Töregene had a reputation for kindness and gift-giving. However, according to Rashid al-Din, this habit of gift-giving drained the Mongol treasury. Furthermore, he says that her gift-giving was nothing but a cover for bribery so that Töregene could ensure her son would become khan.

Töregene expanded the yam system greatly under her rule, using it as a passport system for officials and merchants across the empire. Later khans and khatuns, such as Güyük and Möngke Khan, later reformed the system, introducing the paiza system alongside it, to avoid abuse.

=== Court purges ===
After some time in power, Töregene dismissed her late husband's ministers and replaced them with her own, the most important being another woman, Fatima, a Tajik or Persian captive from the campaigns in Central Asia. She was a Shia Muslim who had been captured in the city of Mashhad and sold as a slave in Mongolia. Fatima was Töregene's most influential cabinet member, as well as an intimate partner.

Töregene tried to arrest several of Ögedei's main officials. Her husband's chief secretary, Chinqai, and the administrator, Mahmud Yalavach, fled to her son Godan Khan in North China, while the administrator of Turkestan, Masud Beg, son of Yalavach, fled to Batu Khan in the Pontic Steppe. Töregene ordered Korguz, governor of Khorasan, arrested and handed over to the widow of Chagatai Khan, whom he had defied. The Chagatayid khan Qara Hülegü executed him by stuffing his mouth full of stones. The reason for his execution was because Korguz had spoken disrespectfully of Chagatai Khan, who had recently died. Töregene appointed Arghun Aqa of the Oirat as governor in Persia. Prior to this, all Mongol officials west of the Amu Darya were appointed or approved by the Jochid clan; however, Töregene disregarded this custom.

At Fatima's suggestion, Yalavach was replaced with Abd-ur-Rahman as general administration in North China, who instituted policies of tax farming in North China. Under Töregene, Fatima became even more powerful at the Mongol court. These actions led the Mongol aristocrats into a frenzy of extortionate demands for revenue. Töregene's allowance of this frenzy is credited to her need for political support in the election of Güyük.

In contemporary histories, such as those by Minhaj-i Siraj Juzjani, Rashid al-Din Hamadani, and Giovanni da Pian del Carpine, Töregene is accused of poisoning her political enemies, particularly in the cases of Ögedei and Möge, as well as Yaroslav II of Vladimir. In the case of Yaroslav, he died soon after eating at Töregene's hut, which led rise to the belief that he had been poisoned. However, these accusations are not entirely trustworthy, as the accounts may have been influenced by Töregene's political enemies. Still, the circumstances of his death are considered suspicious by modern historians.

Shortly before the election of Güyük, Töregene had Temüge executed for attempting to take the khanate by force.

=== Mongol conquests ===
Töregene is perceived of having ruled over the empire in a time where expansion slowed. However, some conquest still happened during her reign.

Prior to her khatunate, Töregene had friendly relations with Ögedei's commanders in China. The conflicts between the Mongols and the Song troops took place in the areas of Chengdu. Töregene sent her envoys to negotiate peace, but Song imprisoned them. The lead envoy, Yuli Massa died shortly after his imprisonment, but the rest of the entourage remained imprisoned until 1254. Under her rule, the Mongols captured Hangzhou and invaded Sichuan in 1242. She ordered Zhang Rou and Chagaan to attack the Song dynasty. When they pillaged the Song territory, the Song court sent a delegation to seek a ceasefire. Chagaan and Zhang Rou returned north after the Mongols accepted the terms.

During the reign of Ögedei, the Sultanate of Rum offered friendship and a modest tribute to Chormaqan. The Mongols began to pressure Kaykhusraw II, the sultan of Rum, to go to Mongolia in person, give hostages, and accept a Mongol darughachi. Mongol raids began in 1240. Kaykhusraw assembled a large army to meet them. The king of Cilician Armenia was required to produce 1400 lances, and the Emperor of Nicaea 400 lances. Both rulers met the sultan in Kayseri to negotiate details. The Grand Komnenos of Trebizond contributed 200, while the young Ayyubid prince of Aleppo supplied 1000 horsemen. In addition to these, Kaykhusraw commanded the Sultanate's army and irregular Turkmen cavalry, though both had been weakened by the Baba Ishak rebellion.

In 1243, Töregene appointed Baiju Noyan to succeed Chormaqan, due to the latter's old age. Later that year, Baiju and his Georgian auxiliaries crushed the forces of Kaykhusraw II at the battle of Köse Dağ in 1243. After that battle, the Sultanate of Rum, the Empire of Trebizond, and Lesser Armenia quickly declared their allegiance one by one to the Mongol Empire ruled by Töregene Khatun.

The Mongol troops under General Baiju probed the forces of the Abbasid Caliphate and the Ayyubid-ruled Syria in 1244–46.

=== Golden Horde ===
Batu Khan had opposed Töregene becoming khatun, while Töregene despised him in turn. Prior to Batu splitting the Golden Horde away from the empire, Töregene called for him to halt his campaigns in Christian lands. She was also believed to have attempted to poison him.

During her rule, Batu challenged her authority, forming the Golden Horde. He claimed authority over the western half of the empire, centered around the Volga. Batu imposed his authority of Baiju, laying claim to the territories he had conquered. Batu was supported by the Chagatai and Tolui royal families. However, coins of Töregene were minted and have been found in Tbilisi and Nakhchivan, showing that she was still able to impose her authority during this time. She and Batu largely avoided conflict by allowing him a degree of autonomous authority within the empire.

Despite Töregene playing a role in his appointment, Baiju clashed with her and her governor of the western part of the empire, Arghun Aqa. Part of the nature of these clashes was over taxes, as Batu was infamous for his extortion of taxes. Because of this, Töregene replaced him with Eljigidei.

== Güyük's reign ==
Töregene was an exercise of power in a society that was traditionally led only by men. She managed to balance the various competing powers within the empire, and even within the extended family of the descendants of Genghis Khan, over a 5-year period in which she not only ruled the empire, but set the stage for the ascension of her son Güyük as Great Khan. Töregene repeatedly pushed for her son to be elected khan, but Güyük himself delayed the election several times, leaving his mother in power.

During Töregene's reign, foreign dignitaries arrived from the distant corners of the empire to her capital at Karakorum or to her nomadic imperial camp. The Seljuk sultan came from Turkey—as did representatives of the Caliph of Abbasid in Baghdad. So did two claimants to the throne of Georgia: David Ulu, the illegitimate son of a late king—and David Narin, the legitimate son of his sister. The highest-ranking European delegate was Alexander Nevsky's father, Grand Prince Yaroslav Vsevolodovich of Vladimir and Suzdal, who died suspiciously just after dining with Töregene Khatun.

For a brief time after the election of Güyük, Töregene continued to hold power. Giovanni da Pian del Carpine reported that, when he visited as an emissary of the Catholic Church, he was directed to Töregene's tent, rather than Güyük's.

Despite her role in ensuring Güyük's election as Khagan, the relationship between Töregene and her son eventually collapsed. According to Minhaj-i Siraj Juzjani and Rashid al-Din Hamadani, Güyük's brother Kötän, who had been ill since the reign of Ögedei, accused Fatima of using witchcraft to damage his health, then died a few months later. Because of this Güyük insisted that his mother hand Fatima over for execution. However, in reality, Kötän did not die until 1251, 1252, or 1253. Rather, Fatima's execution was likely for political purposes instead.

As Güyük attempted to have Fatima arrested, Töregene did everything she could to protect her cherished intimate. She wished to live the rest of her life quietly with Fatima. However, Güyük would not accept this. In response to his continued efforts, Töregene threatened her son Güyük that she would commit suicide to spite him. Güyük's men seized Fatima and put her to death by sewing up all of her orifices and dumping her into water; Töregene's supporters in the imperial household were simultaneously purged.

== Death ==
Following Fatima's death, Töregene herself died under still unexplained circumstances. The specific time of her death is not known. Some sources say that it happened within 18 months of Fatima's death, while others say it happened within three months, and others say that Töregene died before Fatima, with her death delaying Fatima's trial. If Töregene died after Fatima, then heartbreak over her advisor's death has been suggested as a cause. The Muslim historian Minhaj-i Siraj Juzjani Her likely place of death is the Emin Valley, where Töregene had retired to after the election of Güyük.

Töregene was posthumously renamed Empress Zhaoci (Chinese: 昭慈皇后; lit. 'Brilliant kind empress') by Kublai in 1265–1266. She was officially enshrined in Miaoying Temple.

== In popular culture ==
- She was portrayed by Cai Wenyan in The Legend of Kublai Khan (2013).
- A fictionalized version of Töregene Khatun features in the 2021 manga series A Witch's Life in Mongol, which was adapted into an anime television series in 2026.

Töregene Khatun House of Naiman (1242–1246)
Regnal titles
Preceded by Ögedei Khan	Great Khatun (regent) of the Mongol Empire; 1242–1246	Succeeded by Güyük Khan
