= Güyük Khan =

Khagan of the Mongol Empire from 1246 to 1248

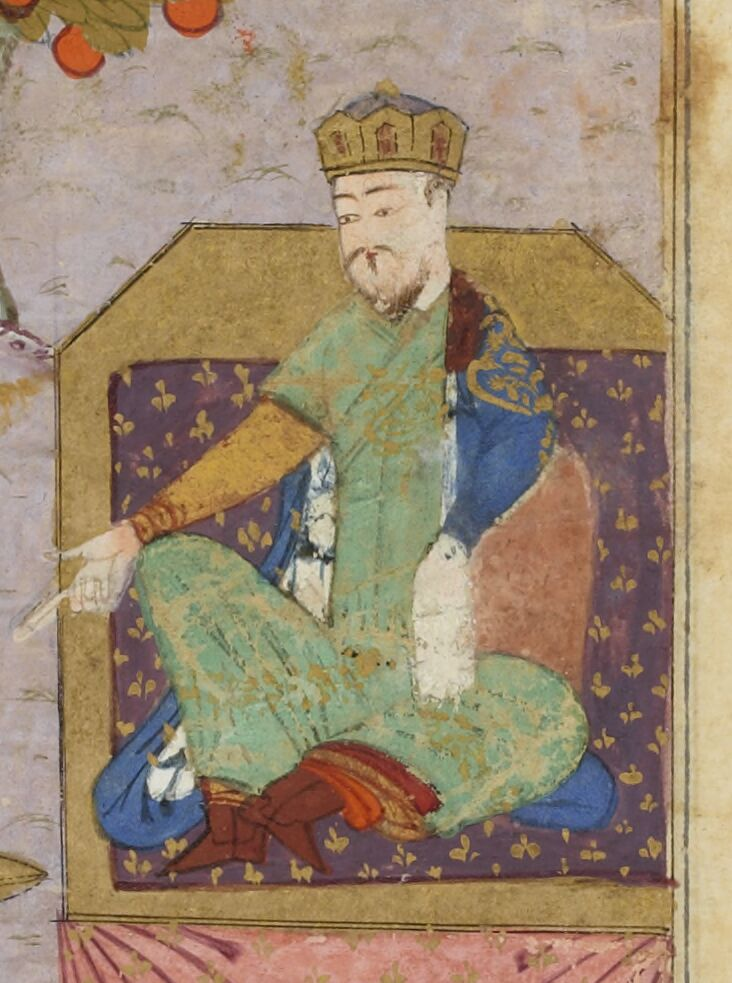
- Depiction of Güyük in a 15th-century Persian miniature

Khagan of the Mongol Empire
- Reign: 24 August 1246 – 20 April 1248
- Coronation: 24 August 1246
- Predecessor: Ögedei Khan; Töregene Khatun (regent)
- Successor: Oghul Qaimish (regent); Möngke Khan
- Born: 19 March 1206; Khamag Mongol
- Died: 20 April 1248 (aged 42); Mongol Empire
- Burial: Unknown, presumptively Burkhan Khaldun (Note: According to History of Yuan, Güyük was buried at Qinian valley (起輦谷). The concrete location of the valley is never mentioned in any documents, many assume that it is somewhere close to the Onon River and the Burkhan Khaldun mountain, Khentii Province, Mongolia.)
- Spouse: Oghul Qaimish
Names
- Mongolian:ᠭᠦᠶᠦᠭ Гүюг; Güyük
Posthumous name
- Emperor Jianping (簡平皇帝) (conferred in 1266)
Temple name
- Dingzong (定宗) (conferred in 1266)
- House: Borjigin
- Father: Ögedei Khan
- Mother: Töregene
- Religion: Christianity
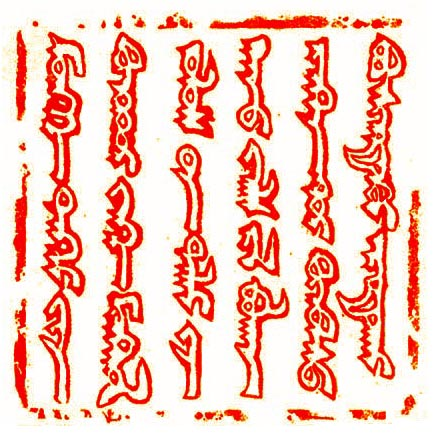
- Seal (Note: Seal of Güyük Khan using the classical Mongolian script, as found in a letter sent to the Roman Pope Innocent IV in 1246.)

Güyük Khan or Güyüg Khagan, (Note: Middle Mongol: ᠭᠦᠶᠦᠭGüyüg Kagan [ˈgʏjʉ̆k ˈqʰaɰɐ̆ɴ]) mononymously Güyüg (Note: Mongolian: Гүюг, romanized: Güyüg, IPA: [ˈgujʉ̆k]; Chinese: 貴由; pinyin: Guìyóu) (c. 19 March 1206 – 20 April 1248), was the third Khagan of the Mongol Empire, the eldest son of Ögedei Khan and a grandson of Genghis Khan. He reigned from 1246 to 1248. He started his military career by participating in the conquest of Eastern Xia in China and later in the invasion of Europe. When his father died, he was enthroned as Khagan in 1246. During his almost two year reign, he reversed some of his mother's unpopular edicts and ordered an empire-wide census; he also held some authority over the Russian principalities, appointing Andrey II as the grand prince of Vladimir.

== Early life ==
Güyük received military training and served as an officer under his grandfather Genghis Khan and later his father Ögedei Khan (after the death of Genghis in 1227). He married Oghul Qaimish of the Merkit clan. In 1233, Güyük, along with his maternal cousin Alchidai and the Mongol general Tangghud, conquered the short-lived Dongxia Kingdom of Puxian Wannu, who was a rebellious Jin official, in a few months. After the death of Güyük's uncle Tolui, Ögedei proposed that Sorghaghtani, the widow of Tolui, marry his son Güyük. Sorghaghtani declined, saying that her prime responsibility was to her own sons. According to Ata-Malik Juvayni, Güyük, son of Ögedei, was a Christian, but does not specify of what denomination.

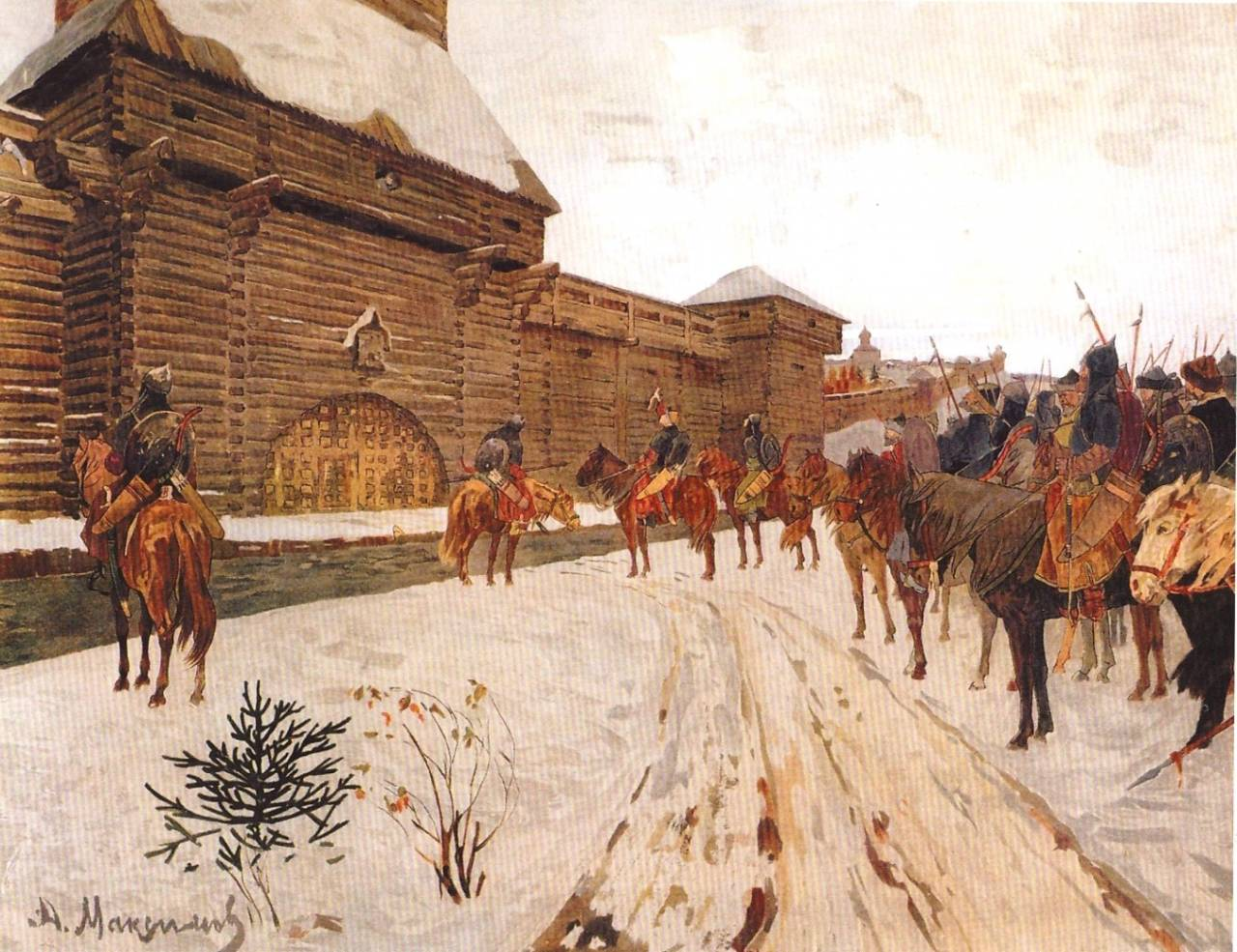
The Mongols outside Vladimir, presumably demanding submission before its sack.

Güyük participated in the invasion of Eastern and Central Europe in 1236–1241 with other Mongol princes, including his cousin Batu and half-brother Kadan. He led his corps in the Siege of Ryazan and the lengthy siege of the Alanian capital Maghas. During the course of the conquest, Güyük quarreled violently with Batu at the victory banquet and screamed at him, "Batu is just an old woman with a quiver". Güyük and Büri, a grandson of Chagatai, stormed out of the banquet and rode away swearing and cursing. When word reached the Great Khan, they were recalled for a time to Mongolia. Ögedei refused to see them and threatened to have his son Güyük executed. Ögedei calmed down and finally admitted Güyük into his ger. Ögedei criticized Güyük, "Do you think that the Russians surrendered because how mean you were to your own men? Do you think that they surrendered because they were afraid of you? Because you captured one or two warriors, you think that you won the war. But you did not capture even a single kid goat." Ögedei reprimanded his son harshly for fighting within the family and for mistreating his soldiers. Güyük was dispatched again to Europe.

In the meantime, Ögedei had died (in 1241), and his widow Töregene had taken over as regent, a position of great influence and authority that she used to advocate for her son Güyük. Batu withdrew from Europe so that he might have some influence over the succession, but despite his delaying tactics, Töregene succeeded in getting Güyük elected Khan in 1246. When Genghis Khan's youngest brother, Temüge, threatened the Great Khatun Toregene in an attempt to seize the throne, Güyük came to Mongolia from Emil to secure his position immediately.

According to Giovanni da Pian del Carpine, Güyük was of "medium stature, very prudent and extremely shrewd, and serious and sedate in his manners."

== Enthronement (1246) ==
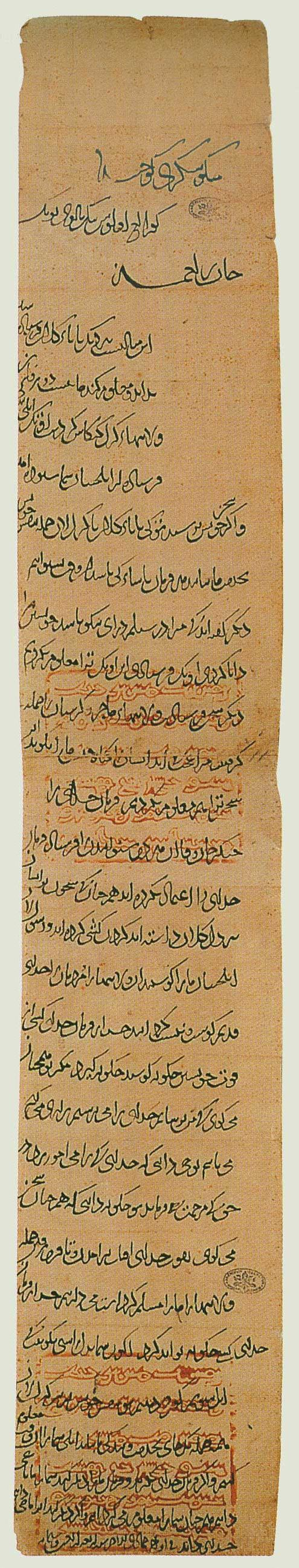
Letter in Persian (1246) in which Güyük Khan demands Pope Innocent IV's submission.

Güyük's enthronement on 24 August 1246, near the Mongol capital at Karakorum, was attended by a large number of foreign ambassadors: the Franciscan friar and envoy of Pope Innocent IV, Giovanni da Pian del Carpine and Benedict of Poland; Grand Prince Yaroslav II of Vladimir; the incumbents for the throne of Georgia, David Narin and David Ulu; the brother of the king of Armenia and historian, Sempad the Constable; the future Seljuk Sultan of Rum, Kilij Arslan IV; and ambassadors of the Abbasid Caliph Al-Musta'sim and Ala ud din Masud of the Delhi Sultanate. According to John of Plano Carpini, Güyük's formal election in a great kurultai, or diet of the tribes, took place while his company was at a camp called Sira Orda, or "Yellow Pavilion," along with 3,000 to 4,000 visitors from all parts of Asia and eastern Europe, bearing homage, tribute, and presents. They afterwards witnessed the formal enthronement at another camp in the vicinity called the "Golden Ordu," after which they were presented to the emperor. Mosul submitted to him, sending envoys to that assembly. According to the 13th-century historian Juvayni:

From Khitai there came emirs and officials; and from Transoxiana and Turkestan the emir Masʿud accompanied by grandees of that region. With the emir Arghun there came the celebrities and notables of Khorasan, Iraq, Lur, Azerbaijan and Shirvan. From Rum came Sultan Kilij Arslan IV and the Sultan of Takavor (Trebizond); from Georgia, the two Davits; from Aleppo, the brother of the Lord of Aleppo; from Mosul, the envoy of Sultan Badr al-Din Luʾluʾ; and from the city of Peace, Baghdad, the chief qadi Fakhr al-Din. There also came the Sultan of Erzurum, envoys from the Franks, and from Kerman and Fars also; and from ʿAla al-Din of Alamut, his governors in Quhistan, Shihab al-Din and Shams al-Din. And all this great assembly came with such baggage as befitted a court; and there came also from other directions so many envoys and messengers that two thousand felt tents had been made ready for them: there came also merchants with the rare and precious things that are produced in the East and the West.

— Ata-Malik Juvayni, 1: 249–50.

When the papal envoy Giovanni da Pian del Carpine protested Mongol attacks on the Catholic kingdoms of Europe, Güyük stated that these people had slain Mongol envoys in the time of Genghis Khan and Ogedei Khan. He also claimed that "from the rising of the sun to its setting, all the lands have been made subject to the Great Khan", proclaiming an explicit ideology of world conquest. The Khagan wrote a letter to Pope Innocent IV on the relations between the Church and the Mongols. "You must say with a sincere heart: 'We will be your subjects; we will give you our strength'. You must in person come with your kings, all together, without exception, to render us service and pay us homage. Only then will we acknowledge your submission. And if you do not follow the order of God, and go against our orders, we will know you as our enemy."

By this time, the relationship between Güyük and Toregene had deteriorated significantly, despite Toregene's role in Güyük's accession. Against Toregene's wishes, Güyük had Toregene's favorite, Fatima, arrested, tortured and executed for bewitching his brother Koden (Khuden), and Abd-ur-Rahman was also beheaded for corruption. Of the provincial officials appointed under Toregene, only the Oirat official Arghun Aqa remained. Toregene herself died later, possibly at Güyük's orders. Güyük had Temüge's case investigated by Orda Khan and Möngke, and they had him executed. Güyük replaced the child khan Qara Hülëgü of the Chagatai Khanate with his favorite cousin Yesü Möngke to secure his position. He also restored his father's officials, Mahmud Yalavach, Masud Beg and Chinqai to positions in the provinces.

== Reign (1246–1248) ==
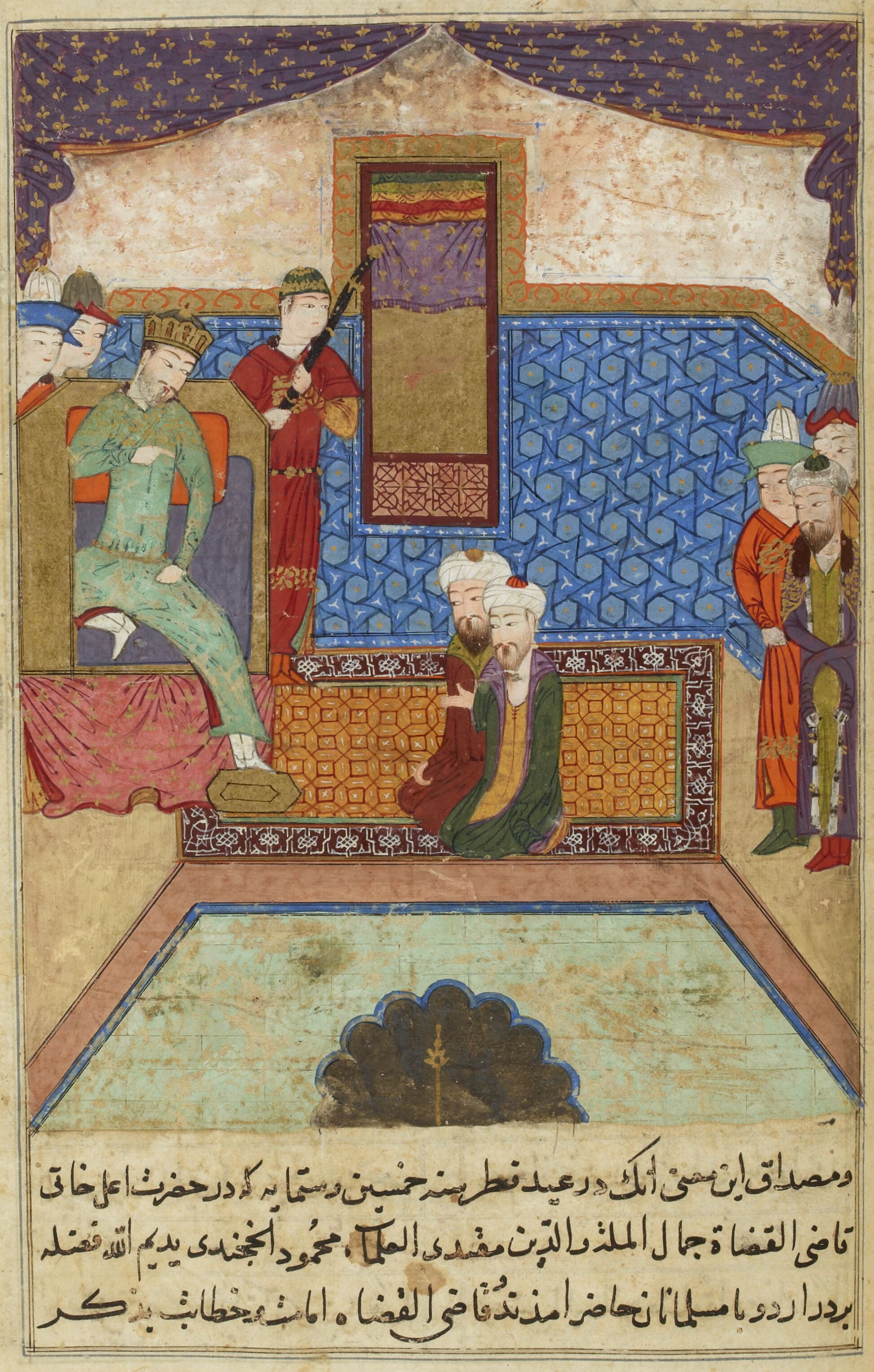
Güyük interrogates Djamâl al-Dîn Mahmûd Hudjandî. Tarikh-i Jahangushay-i Juvaini

Güyük reversed several unpopular edicts of his mother the regent and made a surprisingly capable khan, appointing Eljigidei in Persia in preparation for an attack on Baghdad and the Ismailis and pursuing the war against the Song Dynasty. He was, nevertheless, insecure and won the disapproval of his subjects by executing several high-ranking officials of the previous regime for treason. The Seljuk princes struggled incessantly for the throne of the Sultanate of Rum. Despised by Kaykaus II, Kilij Arslan IV came to Mongolia. Güyük ordered Kilij Arslan enthroned in Kaykaus II's place, and a darughachi with 2,000 Mongol troops was sent to enforce this decision.

When both David Narin and David Ulu were summoned before Güyük in Karakorum, he made David Ulu the senior king and divided the Kingdom of Georgia between them. After the treaty signed by the Mongols and Cilician Armenia in 1243, the king Hetoum I sent his brother Sempad to the Mongol court in Karakorum and made a formal agreement in 1247 in which Cilician Armenia would be considered a vassal state of the Mongol Empire. Due to Armenia's voluntary surrender, Sempad received a Mongol wife, and his kingdom was spared Mongol overseers and tax. Güyük demanded full submission of the Abbasids and the Ismailis. Güyük Khan blamed Baiju for the irritated resistance of the Abbasid Caliphate.

Güyük ordered an empire-wide census. In 1246, by the decree of Güyük, taxes amounting between 1/30 to 1/10 of value were imposed on everything and a heavy head tax of 60 silver drams was collected from males in Georgia and Armenia. Giovanni da Pian del Carpine reported the presence of saracens in southwestern Russia who drafted people into service and recorded the population of those who remained. The Great Khan separated the position of the great darughachi from that of chief scribe. Güyük took half of his father's kheshig for himself. Under his rule, the Uyghur officials increased their dominance, sidelining the North Chinese and the Muslims. Güyük was a strict and intelligent person, though rather morose and sickly, and his bad drinking habit worsened his health.

Güyük sent Amuqan to Korea and the Mongols camped near Yiom-ju in July 1247. After the king Gojong of Goryeo refused to move his capital from Ganghwa Island to Songdo, Amuqan's force pillaged the Korean Peninsula until 1250.

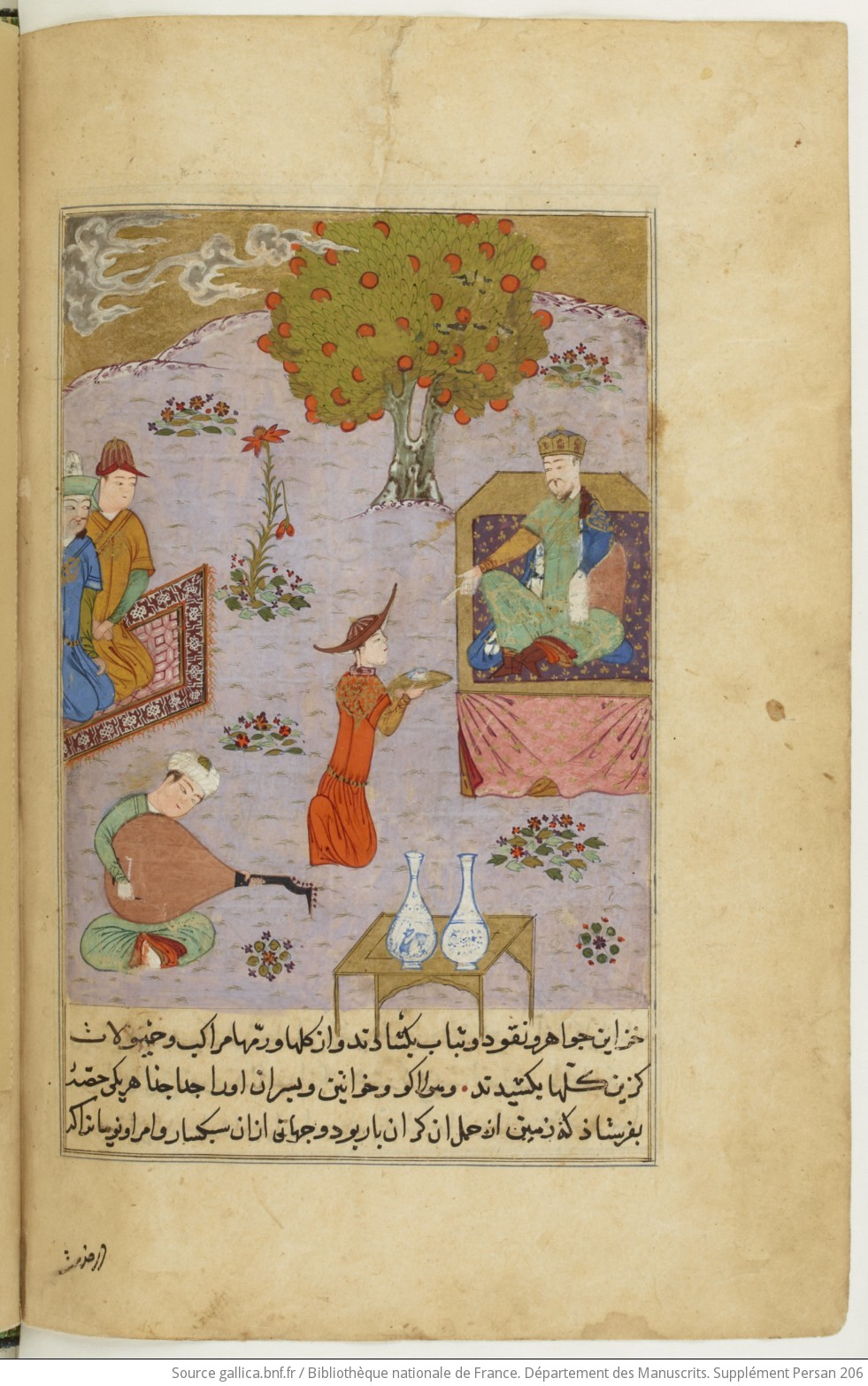
Güyük at the feast. Tarikh-i Jahangushay-i Juvaini

Although Batu did not support Güyük's election, he respected the Great Khan as a traditionalist and sent Andrey and Alexander Nevsky to Karakorum in Mongolia in 1247 after their father's death. Güyük appointed Andrey as the grand prince of Vladimir and gave Alexander the princely title of Kiev. He also appointed his own governors to oversee the Russian principalities. The tribute was known as the dan by the Russians; its main purpose was not only to tax subjects but also to conscript young men into the Mongol armies. The grand princes of Vladimir ultimately became responsible for delivering the Russian tribute to the khan. The Jochids viewed Güyük's appointment of his own governors as direct interference in their power. Tensions between Batu and Güyük reached new heights, and in 1248, Güyük launched a military expedition to take control of the ulus of Jochi, later known as the Golden Horde.

Güyük never made it to the lower Volga; instead, he died on the outskirts of Samarkand. Some sources say that Güyük might have been poisoned by the Jochids; however, some modern historians believe that he died of natural causes because his health deteriorated. According to William of Rubruck, he was killed in a violent brawl with Shiban. His widow Oghul Qaimish took over as regent, but she would be unable to keep the succession within her branch of the family. Möngke succeeded as the great khan in 1251 after being nominated by Batu.

== Wives, concubines, and children ==
It was common for powerful Mongol men to have many wives and concubines, but it is unknown how many wives or concubines Güyük had.

- Primary Consort Wuwuerheimishi (元妃烏兀儿黑迷失), of the Merkit tribe (蔑兒乞氏)
- Empress Naimanzhen (乃蠻真皇后), of the Namaizhen tribe (乃蠻真氏)
- Empress Qinshu (欽淑皇后, d.1251), of the Merkit tribe (蔑兒乞氏)
  - Khoja (忽察), first son
  - Naqu (腦忽), second son
- Unknown wife or concubine:
  - Khokhoo, third son
  - Babahaer (公主 巴巴哈爾), first daughter
    - Married Idqut Qochkar Tegin
  - Yelimishi (趙國公主 葉里迷失), second daughter
    - Married Junbuhua (君不花) and had issues (three sons)
  - a daughter
    - Married Tanggiz of the Oirats and had issue (one daughter)

== Legacy ==
The death of Güyük had a profound effect on world history. Güyük wanted to turn the Mongol power against Europe, but his premature death prevented Mongol forces from trying to move further west into Europe. Subsequent to Güyük's death, Mongol family politics caused the Mongol efforts to be instead directed against southern China, which was eventually conquered during the rule of Kublai Khan.

When Kublai Khan established the Yuan dynasty in 1271, he had Güyük Khan placed on the official record as Dingzong (Chinese: 定宗).

== Notes ==
Güyük Khan House of Borjigin (1206–1634) Born: 1206 Died: 1248
Regnal titles
Preceded by Töregene Khatun (regent)	Khagan-Emperor of the Mongol Empire; 1246–1248	Succeeded by Oghul Qaimish (regent)
