= Godan Khan =

Mongol khan (1206–1251)

- Born: 1206
- Died: 1251 (aged 44–45)
- Dynasty: Borjigin
- Father: Ögedei Khan
- Mother: Töregene Khatun
- Religion: Buddhism

Godan (Chinese: 闊端), also romanized as Koden and Khodan, (1206–1251) was a grandson of Genghis Khan. Godan administered much of Northern China (Cathay) before Kublai Khan came to power. He was the second son of Ögedei Khan and Töregene Khatun and a brother of Güyük Khan. He is broadly known as Godan Khan, even though he did not have the monarchical title of khan. Godan ordered the invasion of Tibet, led by Doord Darkhan (known as Doorta) in 1240.

In 1247 at the request of Godan, Sakya Pandita and his two nephews served as delegates of Tibet's political leadership at the suggestion of the Abbot of Reting Monastery, when Sakya Pandita arrived at Godan's court he cured Godan of an illness, and Godan then became his disciple and converted to Buddhism and learned the Tantras; thus began the special relationship that eventually made the Sakyapas rulers of Tibet. In addition, Sakya Pandita with the aid of his nephew Drogön Chögyal Phagpa were encouraged by Godan to invent a Mongolian script, called 'Phags-pa script named after its inventor.

== See also ==
- Ögedei Khan
- Mongol invasions of Tibet
