= Yelü Chucai =

Khitan adviser to Genghis Khan (1190–1244)

- Statue of Yelü Chucai at the Wuyi Mountains Tea Theme Park
- Born: 24 July 1190; Yanjing, Jin dynasty
- Died: 20 June 1244 (aged 53); Karakorum, Mongol Empire
- Issue: Yelü Zhu 耶律鑄
Names
- Family name: Yēlǜ 耶律; Given name: Chǔcái 楚材; Courtesy name: Jìnqīng 晉卿
Posthumous name
- Prince of Guangning 廣寧王; Wenzheng 文正
- Father: Yelü Lü 耶律履
- Mother: Lady Yang

Yelü Chucai (Chinese: 耶律楚材; pinyin: Yēlǜ Chǔcái; Mongolian: Urtu Saqaltu "Longbeard", written in Chinese characters as "吾圖撒合里", July 24, 1190 – June 20, 1244), courtesy name Jinqing (Chinese: 晉卿), was a Khitan statesman from the imperial Yelü clan of the Liao dynasty, who became a vigorous adviser and administrator of the early Mongol Empire under Genghis Khan and later his successor Ögedei Khan.

A trained Confucian scholar and court official, he served as scribe-secretary and court astrologer-astronomer during the reign of Genghis Khan, facilitating the latter's meeting with monk Qiu Chuji. Upon the enthronement of Ögedei, his influence increased, being put in charge in 1229 of taxation reform in North China, and being appointed Head of the Great Imperial Secretariat. His position weakened in the latter half of Ögedei's reign, but he was still treated with respect until his death in 1244 during the regency of Töregene Khatun.

== Biography ==
Yelü Chucai was born close in Zhongdu (modern day Beijing), capital of the Jin dynasty. He was a descendant of Yelü Bei and a member of the Yelü clan, former rulers of the Khitan Liao dynasty. After its overthrow by the Jurchen-led Jin dynasty in 1125, its members began to serve the new state, including his father Yelü Lu, who rose from a translator to becoming a minister during the reign of Emperor Zhangzong. After his father died when Yelü Chucai was 2 years old, his scholarly mother took care of his formal education. He was busy studying the Confucian classics by age thirteen, and despite being offered entry at age seventeen into the Jin civil service on account of his father's position, he opted to sit for the Imperial examinations, coming out first on the list. By 1213, he had been made prefect of Kaizhou prefecture.

In 1211, the unified Mongol army under Genghis Khan began a war of conquest against the Jin dynasty, attacking Zhongdu multiple times, culminating in a 10-month siege of the city in 1213. Yelü Chucai had been recalled to Zhongdu by then and had the title of Auxiliary Secretary of the Boards of Right and Left. The siege affected him greatly, causing a mental crisis. He thereafter began seeking out the teachings of Chan Buddhism, which he only had superficial knowledge in the past. Becoming a student under Wansong Xingxiu in 1215, he pursued his studies for three years while serving as a scribe to the new rulers.

In the year 1218 at the age of 28, he was summoned to the Mongol court, located between the Tuul and Kherlen rivers. Genghis Khan had previously rallied many Khitan leaders, including members of Yelu clan, having had members such as Yelü Ahai and Yelü Tuhua as long-serving guardsmen. The Khitans and Mongols, as well as the Southern Song, were united by their common enemy in the Jin dynasty. This is shown in the well-known words spoken by Genghis Khan, when at the end of July, he met Yelü Chucai for the first time: "Liao and Jin have been enemies for generations; I have taken revenge for you." To which Yelü Chucai replied, "My father and grandfather have both respectfully served the Jin. How can I, as a subject and a son, be so insincere in heart as to consider my sovereign and my father as enemies?" The Khan is said to have been impressed by this frank reply, as well as by Yelü Chucai's presence - a man of tall stature, a long beard, and a sonorous voice. He was given the nickname "Urtu Saqal" (Long Beard) and placed him in his retinue as an adviser.

Because he was experienced in writing and knew the laws of other settled societies, Yelü Chucai was useful to the Empire. He did his best to convince the Mongols to tax rather than slaughter conquered peoples. In Grousset's Empire of the Steppes, it is reported that Ögedei would mock him, asking "Are you going to weep for the people again?". The chancellor had the words to temper the Mongol practices, stating to Genghis Khan's son and successor to the throne, that while empires may be conquered on horseback, they could not be ruled on horseback. Yelü Chucai used his office to save other fellow Confucian scholars from punishment and mistreatment by Mongol rulers. He also helped them gain offices as bureaucrats and tutors to the Mongol princes.

While Northern China was capitulating to the Mongol onslaught, Yelü Chucai instituted several administrative reforms, like separating civil and military powers and introducing numerous taxes and levies. In response to the tough resistance the Mongol army faced while trying to conquer the Jurchen Jin's southern capital of Kaifeng, some Mongol officers in high command recommended the complete razing of Kaifeng and the deaths of all its occupants. But Yelü Chucai convinced Genghis Khan to rule and tax the people, and make use of their extraordinary talents instead of killing all of them in order to further their own riches.

Yelü Chucai was six feet and eight inches tall and had a waist-length beard. He was buried by Kunming Lake in Beijing, and a temple constructed in his memory stood until 1966, when it was razed during the looting of the Summer Palace by communist Red Guards as part of the Cultural Revolution. Yelü Chucai was the last recorded person to be able to speak the Khitan language and read and write the Khitan large and small scripts.

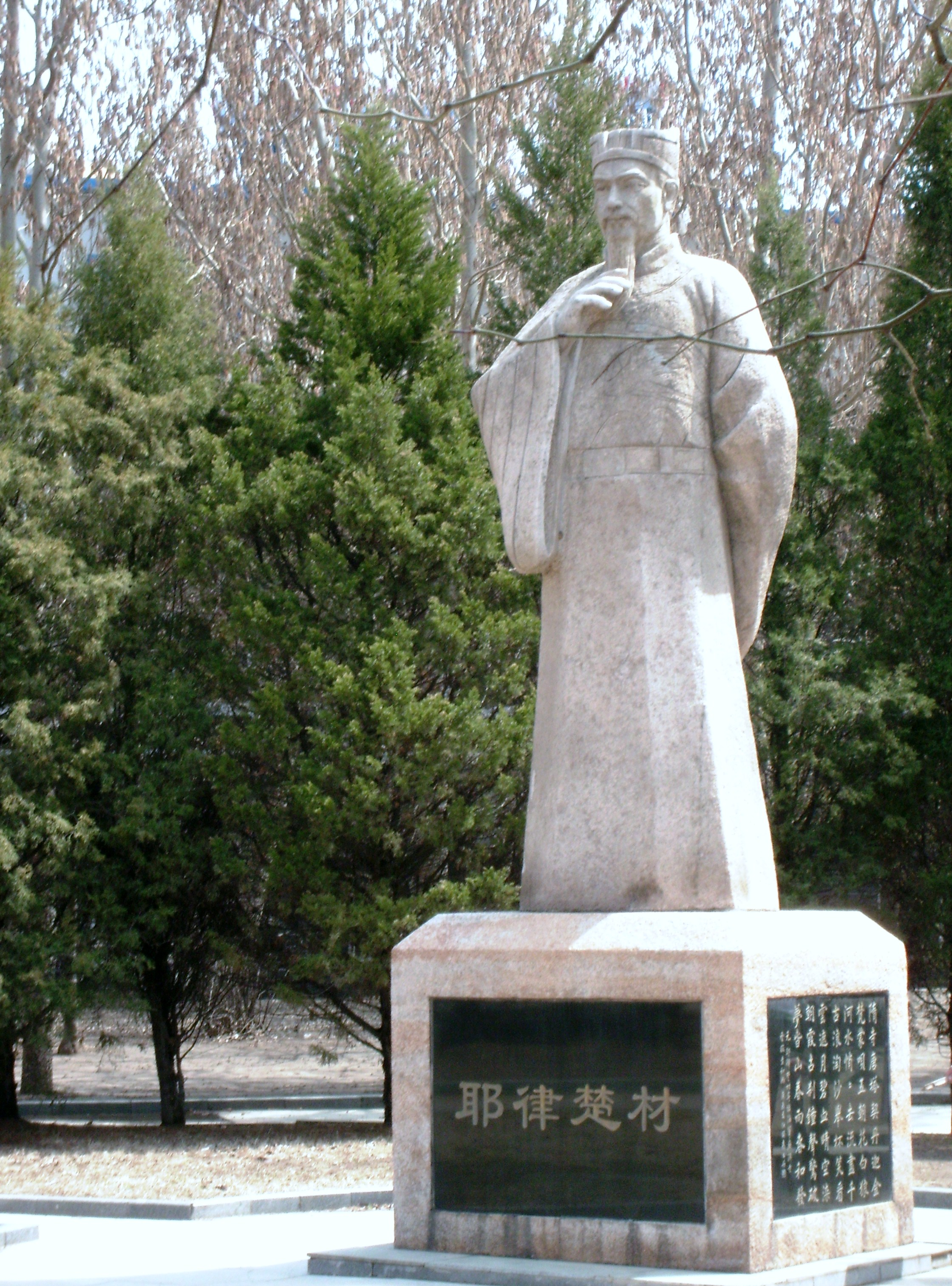
A statue of Yelü Chucai, located in the southeast corner of Guta Park in Jinzhou.

== See also ==
- Temple of Azure Clouds
