= Ortogh =

Business partner of the Mongols

Ortogh, also ortoq (Turkic: ortaq; Mongolian: ортог; Persian: urtak) was a merchant partnered with the state and individual aristocrats in the Mongol Empire. The term derived from the Turkic word ortak, meaning "partner." The institution allowed merchants to pool their resources and thereby reduce the risk of failed caravans, allowing for the expansion of long-distance trade and a substantial reduction in its costs.

The institution of ortogh began when Chinggis Khan had his family members and military commanders select Muslims, mainly Uyghurs or West Turkistanis, to entrust with gold and silver ingots for trade purposes. The merchants were usually offered very high commissions and permitted to use official relay stations as long as they did not interfere with military actions. The Mongols also offered low-interest loans to merchants if they belonged to an ortogh. In 1268, Kublai Khan created the General Administration for the Supervision of Ortogh to lend them money at low interest.

Ortoqs were involved in a range of commercial activities, including long-distance trade, money-lending, and the management of commercial ventures. Mongol princes and aristocrats supplied capital, which merchant partners invested in trade and other business activities. Profits were shared according to the terms of their agreements, while merchants could receive privileges such as access to the imperial postal network and tax exemptions. Ortoq partnerships also connected Mongol elites with merchants from different parts of Eurasia, including Central and West Asia. These arrangements helped facilitate commercial activity across the empire.

The Mongols adopted and developed the concepts of liability in relation to investments and loans in Mongol–ortoq partnerships, promoting trade and investment to facilitate the commercial integration of the Mongol Empire. The contractual features of a Mongol-ortoq partnership closely resembled that of qirad and commenda arrangements, however, Mongol investors used metal coins, paper money, gold and silver ingots and tradable goods for partnership investments and primarily financed money-lending and trade activities. Moreover, Mongol elites formed trade partnerships with merchants from Eastern, Central and Western Asia, and Europe, including Marco Polo’s family.

Ortogh merchants had a low reputation among Chinese for their special treatment and their moneylending at high interest rates. Wang Yun was critical of the special privileges of the ortogh, in particular the right to bear arms. By the Ming dynasty, the word ortogh no longer had a special meaning and simply meant merchant.
