= Darughachi =

Official in the Mongol Empire

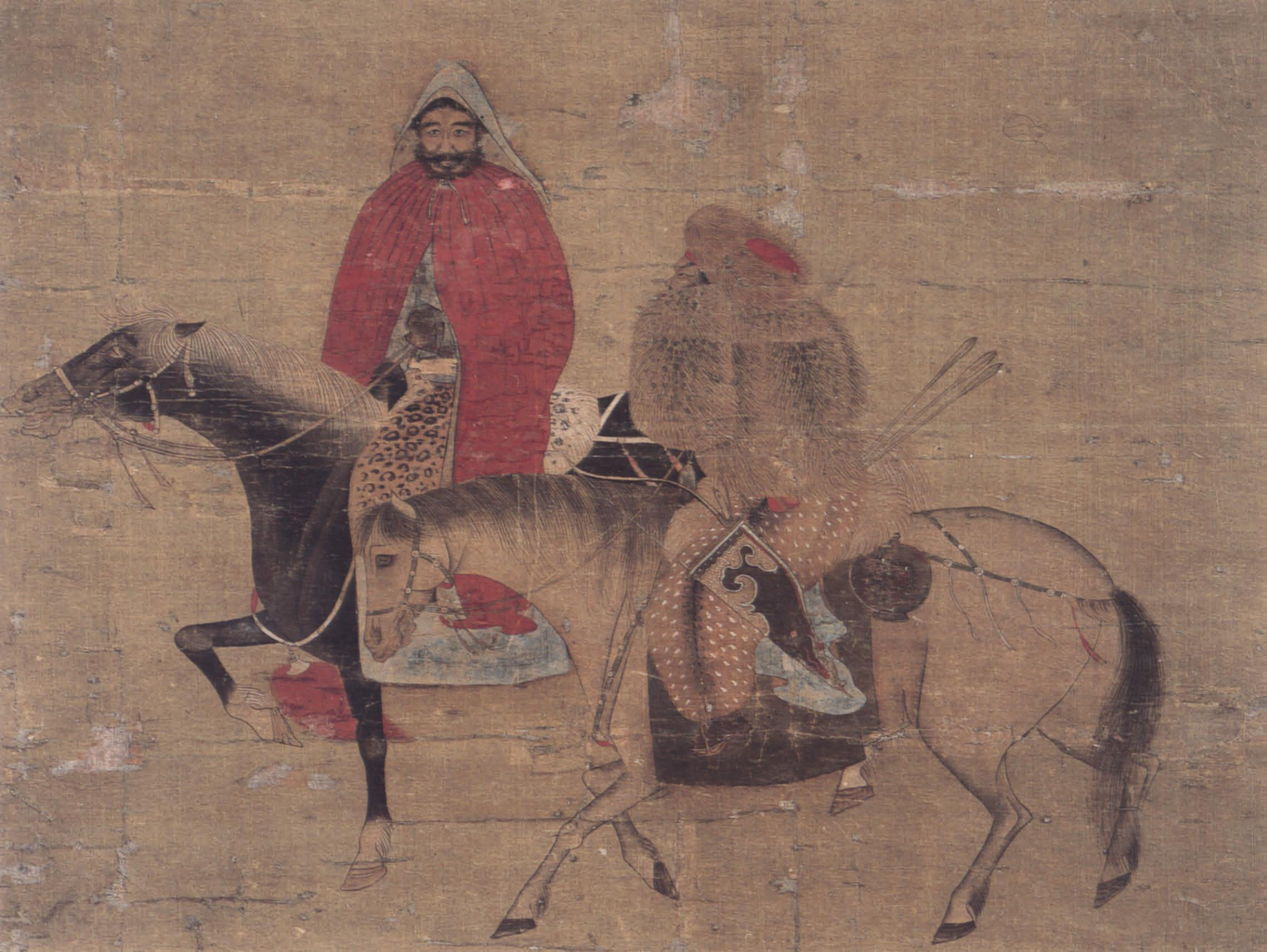
Mongol rider with administrator. Painting on silk from the Yuan era. Art and History Collection, on loan to the Arthur M. Sackler Gallery.

A darughachi or daruqachi (Mongolian form, pl. darughachin), also known as a basqaq or baskak (Turkic form), was originally a designated official in the Mongol Empire responsible for taxes and administration in a certain province. A darughachi ruled over a territorial subdivision known as a darugha. They were sometimes referred to as governors. The term corresponds to dārugheh (Persian: داروغه), and basqaq or baskak in Turkic, dálǔhuāchì in Pinyin or ta lu hua ch'ih in Wade–Giles (Traditional Chinese characters: 達魯花赤; Simplified Chinese characters: 达鲁花赤) in Chinese.

== Etymology ==
Darughachi

Chinese name
- Chinese: 達魯花赤
Transcriptions
Standard Mandarin
- Hanyu Pinyin: dálǔhuāchì

Mongolian name
- Mongolian Cyrillic: Даргач
- Mongolian script: ᠳᠠᠷᠤᠭᠠᠴᠢ
Transcriptions
- SASM/GNC: Daruγači

The historians Claude Cahen and István Vásáry concluded that the terms basqaq (Turkic), shahna (Persian, derived from Arabic) and darughachi (Mongolian) had different origins, but became interchangeable under Mongol rule. According to Vásáry, only "a certain territorial distribution can be observed".

== History ==
This title was established under the rule of Genghis Khan from 1211. The Secret History of the Mongols relates that after the Kipchaks and the Russian principalities were conquered in 1237–1240, Ögödei placed darughachi and tammachin to govern the peoples whose major cities were Ornas, Saḳsīn, Bolghar, and Kiev. According to the writings of Giovanni da Pian del Carpine, the basqaq was established in regions that had been conquered so that rebellions could be suppressed. The institution was created in Russia in 1245 and the officials were placed in the forest zone, although they were later recalled. These officials supervised the collection of tribute, but from the 1280s, the Russian grand princes took on this role.

Under the Yuan dynasty, the title of zhangguan replaced the former designation. There was one such official for each administrative subdivision, where functions of governor and chief of the armies were combined. This title was also given to a person at the head of a central government office. The charge usually fell to a Mongol, probably to a Semu, thus guaranteeing the preservation of power within the Mongols. Some other populations, however, could have an administrative title with close functions. The texts of Yanghe mention that he should be paid a large sum of gold and silver when the darugha Turfan was replaced.

The Turkic term basqaq does not appear in Mongolian sources. In Russian sources, the darughachi were almost always referred to as baskak (Russian: баскак, pl. baskaki). They appear in the 13th century, soon after the Mongol conquest, but were withdrawn by 1328 as the grand prince of Vladimir, usually the prince of Moscow, was entrusted with gathering the dan, or tribute, from dependent Russian principalities for the Golden Horde. A more modest role was given to the grand princes of Nizhny Novgorod, Tver, and Ryazan. The terms basqaq and darughachi were used in both China and the Golden Horde, although basqaq eventually disappeared, while daruga, the Russian equivalent to darughachi, was the only term used in the 14th century.

In the 13th century, chiefs of Mongol darughas were stationed in Vladimir and Baghdad. The Mongol Empire attempted to send darughachi to Goryeo in 1231, after the first (of six) invasions. According to some records, 72 darughachi were sent and the Mongol military garrisons were withdrawn. However, repeated rebellions and the continued Goryeo resistance to Mongol dominion (the original darughachi that were stationed were all killed by Goryeo forces in the summer of 1232) made the stationing of darughachi difficult. While there are questions regarding the actual number of darughachi stationed, most reliable sources (including the Goryeo-sa) indicate that at least some darughachi were stationed in Goryeo for the duration of its vassaldom to the Mongol Empire. The extant record denoted 72 darughachiwas itself a derivation of an older record that has been lost. Goryeo was too small a territory to merit so many darughachi. The names of none of the 72 darughachi remain, which is unusual considering the importance of their position. While further mention of the darughachi in Korea is scarce in extant sources, after peace was secured between Goryeo and the Mongol Empire in 1259, Korea was established as a Mongol vassal, and the stationing of darughachi in Korea was likely a more stable proposition.

After 1921, the word darga ('boss') (Khalkha for darugha) replaced the aristocratic noyan as the term for high-level officials in Mongolia.

== See also ==
- Darugha

== Sources ==
- "Баскак" . Brockhaus and Efron Encyclopedic Dictionary (in Russian). 1906.
- Hautala, Roman (4 April 2022). "The Jochid Ulus". The Mongol World (1 ed.). Routledge. pp. 245–262. doi:10.4324/9781315165172-20. ISBN 978-1-315-16517-2.
