= Mongolian names =

Mongolian names have undergone a number of changes in the history of Mongolia, both with regard to their meaning and their source languages. In Inner Mongolia, Buryatia and Kalmykia, naming customs are now similar to Mongolia but with some differences.

== Historical evolution ==
Mongolian names traditionally have an important symbolic character—a name with auspicious connotations being thought to bring good fortune to its bearer. The naming of children was usually done by the parents or a respected elder of the family or religious figures. For example, it is said that in the 13th century, the prominent shaman, Teb-tengeri, saw in the stars a great future for Tolui's eldest son and bestowed on the child the name Möngke (meaning "eternal" in the Mongolian language).

Nowadays most parents give Mongolian names to their children, often in the form of compounds consisting of two nouns or adjectives, representing qualities such as solidity and strength for boys or beauty in the case of girls.

Generally, the Mongols, distinct from other cultures in East Asia, have only one personal name, which remains the same throughout their lives. While clan organization remained important among the Mongols into the 17th century, clan names were not linked with the personal name in a family name system. Clan name is still important among the Buryats and to a lesser extent among Kalmyks today. While the personal name of the living ruler was not originally tabooed, as in China, the names of deceased rulers were tabooed for several generations. In the past this prohibition was even stronger. In Mongolia and Inner Mongolia, the Mongols also use clan names.

=== Middle Ages ===
The most common category of Mongol names were those of auspicious or (for boys) manly things, such as gold (altan), eternity (Möngke), surplus (hulagu), blue (köke), white (chagha’an), good health (esen), uncle (abaqa), firmness (batu), stability (toqto'a), bulls (buqa, for men), iron (temür), steel (bolad), black (qara), hardness (berke), nine (yisü) Munkhchuluun (Eternal) or Nomt (Book).

Such names were often combined with suffixes used only for personal names, such as -dai, -ge/gei, and -der for boys and -jin, -tani, and -lun for girls. However, Temüjin's -jin is a form of the occupational derivational suffix -cin, but not a feminine suffix: temür 'iron' + -cin = temüjin 'smith'.

Other names were based on either conquests or clan names. For example, Sartaq (merchants of western Asian or western Central Asian origin), Hasi (Mongolian form of Tangut-led Western Xia dynasty), Orus (Rus), Asudai (Alani) and so on. Clan-based personal names did not relate to the person's own clan or tribe. For example, Eljigidey was not from Iljigin (Eljigin) tribe and the Mongol general Mangghudai was a Tatar, but not a Manghud.

One finds a number of degrading or inauspicious names during the 13–14th centuries such as Sorqaqtani, "Pox girl", or Nohai (~Nokai) "dog", in an attempt to fool bad spirits or disease into thinking it had already afflicted them. This tradition is still preserved in Mongolia in modern times. Symbolic names that express frustration can be found such as the not uncommon girls' name Oghul-qaimish (Middle Turkic "next time a boy"), while the name Jochi "Guest" indicated doubts about the child's paternity.

Turkic names were common among Mongols (such as Oghul-qaimish, Abishqa, Qutlugh and so on). However, names of other foreign origin were introduced when the Mongol Empire expanded all over Eurasia, increasing international trade and cultural connections and also partly due to religious dignity. Ghazan, Kharbanda, or Toghus (peacock) are not Mongol words. Christian names also existed among the Turkic and Mongol peoples (especially Onguts and Keraits) on the Mongolian Plateau. The Ilkhan Öljeitü's name at birth was Nicholas.

Some Mongols had Chinese names. For example, the Buddhist monk, Haiyun, bestowed the name Zhenjin (True-gold) to Khubilai and Chabi's eldest son. In the late 13th century, many newborn children in Italy were named after Mongol rulers, including Hülegü.

From the mid-13th century Sanskrit, Uyghur, and Tibetan Buddhist names (Ananda (the Yuan prince), Dorji (Khubilai's son) or Wachir (a Yuan official), Gammala (Khubilai's son), Irinchin (the Ilkhanid general), etc.) granted by Tibetan teachers became common in the royal family and the aristocratic clans. In the west some Mongols took Islamic names such as Bū Sa'īd (misspelled as Abu Sa'id) or Khwaja after they converted, although many kept their Mongolian names.

After the expulsion of the Mongol regime from China, the Sanskrit names in the imperial family soon disappeared. Christian names appeared occasionally before disappearing (Markörgis Khan). Muslim and Turkic names also declined (Akbarjin, Ismayil or Arghun), leaving primarily the auspicious Mongolian names similar to those in the early empire. For example, some of the later Mongolian Emperors' names include Batumöngke, Buyan, Esen, Toγtoγa Buqa and Manduul. Mongol name customs also affected the nations under Mongol rule. The Jurchens (ancestors of Manchus) in Ming China often used Mongolian names. Sayyid Ajjal Shams al-Din Omar's great-grandson was given the name Bayan "rich".

=== Late Middle Ages and early modern period ===
With the beginning of the new wave of Buddhism in 1575, however, Buddhist and Tibetan names were reintroduced into Mongolia. By 1700 the vast majority of Mongols had Buddhist names, usually Tibetan, but also sometimes Sanskrit or from Mongolian Buddhist terminology. A number of Mongolian-language names survived, particularly with more pacific elements designating peace (Engke, Amur), happiness (Jirgal), long life (Nasu), and blessing (Öljei, Kesig).

Buddhist names were granted according to several different principles. The most common for laymen are based on the Tibetan or Sanskrit names of powerful deities: Damdin/Damrin (Hayagriva), Dulma/Dari (Tara), Gombo (Mahākāla), Cagdur/Shagdur (Vajrapani), Jamsrang (Begtse), Jamyang (Manjusri), etc. Another type of Buddhist name derives from the Tibetan days of the week, themselves named after the Sun, Moon, and five visible planets (Nima, Dawa, Migmar, Lhagba, Pürbü, Basang, Bimba). Another astrological scheme divides the days of the month into five classes, each under an element: Dorji (power bolt), Badma (lotus), and Sangjai (Buddha). The suffixes -jab (Tibetan skyabs "protecting") and -sürüng (Tibetan -srung "guarding") were commonly added to these Buddhist names. Finally, some names, particularly for monks, were based on Tibetan words for desired qualities or aspects of the religion: Lubsang "good intellect", Agwang "powerful in speech", Danzin "instruction keeper", Dashi/Rashi, "blessed". A number of Buddhist terms exist in multiple forms transmitted from Old Uyghur, Tibetan, and Sanskrit: thus, Wachir/Ochir, Dorji, and Bazar all mean "power bolt", while Erdeni, Rinchin, and Radna all mean "jewel".

A distinctive type of Mongolian name that flourished in this period and is still common in the countryside is the avoidance name, designed to avert misfortune from the child: Nergüi "No Name", Enebish "Not This", Terbish "Not That".

=== Modern ===
==== Mongolia ====
In the 20th century, when Mongolia had close ties to the Soviet Union, Mongols were sometimes given Russian names like Alexander or Sasha, or mixed ones like Ivaanjav consisting of the Russian Ivan and the Tibetan -jav. Politically active parents may have chosen Oktyabr (October), Seseer (SSR), Mart (March) and even Molotov as names for their offspring. One such example is Melschoi, composed of the first letters of Marx, Engels, Lenin, Stalin and Choibalsan.

Today male names still include the names of old Mongolian elements such as 'iron' or 'steel', or other words denoting strength, such as 'hero', 'strong', or 'ax': some examples are Gansükh 'steel-ax', Batsaikhan 'strong-nice', or Tömörbaatar 'iron-hero', Chuluunbold 'stone-steel' and Nomtoimergen 'Book Wise'. Temujin, Borte, Yisu and other old names are commonly given to newborn children after 1990.

Women's names commonly refer to fine colours or flowers, the sun and moon, or may be made up of any other word with positive connotations using the feminine suffix -maa (Tib. 'mother'): some common examples are Altantsetseg 'golden-flower', Narantuyaa 'sun-beam', Uranchimeg 'artistic-decoration', Sarangerel 'moon-light', Erdenetungalag 'jewel-clear', and Tsetsegmaa 'flower'.

Many gender-neutral name components refer to auspicious qualities such as eternity or happiness: some examples are Mönkh 'eternal', Erdene 'jewel', Oyuun 'mind', Altan 'golden', Saikhan 'fine' and Enkh 'peace'. Many names include the names of places, including mountains, rivers etc., e.g. Altai or Tuul.

Mongolians do not use surnames in the way that most Westerners, Chinese or Japanese do. Since the socialist period, patronymics — at that time called ovog, (Note: The traditional meaning of ovog is related to clans, not patronymics.) now known as etsgiin ner — are used instead of a surname. If the father's name is not legally established (i.e., by marriage) or altogether unknown, a matronymic is used. The patro- or matronymic is written before the given name.

Therefore, if a man with given name Tsakhia has a son, and gives the son the name Elbegdorj, the son's full name, as it appears in passports and the like, is Tsakhia Elbegdorj. Very frequently, as in texts and speech, the patronymic is given in genitive case, i.e. Tsakhiagiin Elbegdorj, with (in this case) -giin being the genitive suffix. However, the patronymic is rather insignificant in everyday use and usually just abbreviated to an initial - Ts. Elbegdorj. People are normally just referred to and addressed by their given name (Elbegdorj guai - 'Mr. Elbegdorj'), and the patronymic is only used to distinguish two people with a common given name. Even then, they are usually just distinguished by their initials, not by the full patronymic. There are cases in which a matronymic has been legally bestowed for one or the other reason, while a patronymic is known. If the patronymic is to be conveyed anyway, this can take a form like Altan Choi ovogt Dumaagiin Sodnom with the patronymic preceding the word ovog that takes the suffix -t 'having'.

The basic differences between Mongolian and European names, in connection with trying to fit Mongolian names into foreign schemata, frequently lead to confusion. For example, Otryadyn Gündegmaa, a Mongolian shooter, is often incorrectly referred to as Otryad, i.e. by the (given) name of her father. But now, as Mongolians establish more international relations, this practice has been more or less standardised. For example, the 2024 Olympic silver medalist, Bavuudorjiin Baasankhüü, is referred to as Baasankhüü Bavuudorj, putting the given name in the first name position, and father's name in the family name position. Mongolians do not use their clan name due to historical reasons. Even saying your clan name was taboo up until very recently; however, there is a growing trend in people finding their real clan origination after being falsely claimed 'Borjigin'.

Since 2000, Mongolians have been officially using clan names—ovog, the same word that was used for the patronymics during the socialist period—on their ID cards (the clan name is also referred to as urgiin ovog, meaning lineage name, among general use, to distinguish from the patro- or matronymic). Many people chose the names of the ancient clans and tribes such Borjigin, Besud, Jalair, etc. Others chose the names of the native places of their ancestors, or the names of their most ancient known ancestor. Some just decided to pass their own given names (or modifications of their given names) to their descendants as clan names. A few chose other attributes of their lives as surnames; Mongolia's first cosmonaut Gürragchaa chose 'Sansar' (Outer space). Clan names precede the patronymics and given names, as in Besud Tsakhiagiin Elbegdorj. In practice, these clan names seem to have had no significant effect — nor are they included in Mongolian passports.

==== Inner Mongolia ====
In Inner Mongolia, Chinese names are quite common, as are Mongolian names. Mongolian names of Tibetan origin are usually restricted to people in their 50s and older. Because China does not recognize Mongolian clan names, Mongols in China who have acquired their passports since 2001 have "XXX" printed in place of their surnames, while before not only "XXX" but also a syllable from an individual's given name or the first syllable of the patronymic was used in place of the Chinese surname. Also, for some individuals, "XXX" is printed in the slot for the given name, while the given name is printed in the slot for the surname.

Some Mongolians in China do have surnames because their parents are Han, Hui, Manchu etc. Some others use an abbreviation (like Bao 'Borjigin') of their clan name.

Officially, Mongolian names in China are transcribed with the SASM/GNC/SRC transcriptions (e.g. Ulanhu), but this system is rarely used. Generally, the names in Chinese passports are given in the Pinyin form of the Chinese character transcription of the original Mongolian. For example, Mengkebateer (from 孟克巴特尔) would be used instead of Möngkebaghatur (Mongolian script), Mөnghebagatur (Mongolian pinyin) or Munkhbaatar (approximate English pronunciation).

Sometimes in such Chinese transcriptions of Mongolian names, the first syllable is reanalyzed as the surname, i.e. Ulanhu becomes Wu Lanfu. Onset (if available) and nucleus of the first syllable of the father's name can be used for disambiguation, but have no official status, e.g. Na. Gereltü. Rarely, the onset is used on its own, e.g. L. Toγtambayar.

=== Siblings ===
Siblings are sometimes given names containing similar morphemes, like Gan-Ochir, Gantömör etc., or names related to the same theme, like Naran ('Sun'), Saran ('Moon'), Tsolmon ('Morning star').

=== Taboo names ===
There is also a tradition of giving names with unpleasant qualities to children born to a couple whose previous children have died, in the belief that the unpleasant name will mislead evil spirits seeking to steal the child. Muunokhoi 'Vicious Dog' may seem a strange name, but Mongolians have traditionally been given such taboo names to avoid misfortune and confuse evil spirits. Other examples include Nekhii 'Sheepskin', Nergüi 'No Name', Medekhgüi, 'I Don't Know', Khünbish 'Not a Human Being', Khenbish 'Nobody', Ogtbish 'Not at All', Enebish 'Not This One', Terbish 'Not That One'.

Couples whose previous boys have died would give female names to their son to mislead the evil spirits, and vice versa. Synchronically, taboo meaning may be stronger or obliterated: Nergüi, for example, is very common and does not immediately raise any association, while Khünbish might semantically be perceived as khün bish (cf. the same phenomenon in German with the unremarkable Burkhart (lit. 'castle-strong') versus the unusual Fürchtegott ('fear-God')).

=== Nicknames ===
When addressing a familiar person, names are shortened, most commonly by choosing one of the parts of the name and adding a vowel, melting it into one or adding the suffix -ka. E.g., a woman named Delgerzayaa might be called Delgree, Zayaa or Deegii, a man named Arslandorj might become Askaa, or his sister Idertuyaa could become Idree, and so might her boyfriend Iderbayar or a friend Nomtoimergen would be Nomt.

== Name structure ==
In the Middle Ages, there were no patronymics, but clan names were sometimes used in a particular morphological form.

== List of common names ==
In Mongolia, as of 2012, the 20 most common names were:

Name	Transliteration	Translation	Male/female	Occurrence
Бат-Эрдэнэ	Bat-Erdene	Firm jewel	m	13,473
Отгонбаяр	Otgonbayar	Budding/youngest happiness	m	11,083
Алтанцэцэг	Altantsetseg	Golden flower	f	10,967
Оюунчимэг	Oyuunchimeg	Decoration [consisting of a notable] mind	f	10,580
Батбаяр	Batbayar	Unyielding happiness	m	10,570
Болормаа	Bolormaa	Crystal lady	f	10,282
Энхтуяа	Enkhtuya	Ray of peace	f	9,721
Лхагвасүрэн	Lkhagvasüren	Great Healer	m	9,334
Гантулга	Gantulga	Steel hearth	m	9,268
Эрдэнэчимэг	Erdenechimeg	Jewel decoration	f	9,232
Ганболд	Ganbold	Steel-steel	m	9,118
Нэргүй	Nergüi	Nameless	m	8,874
Энхжаргал	Enkhjargal	Peaceful happiness	f	8,843
Ганзориг	Ganzorig	Courage of steel	m	8,760
Наранцэцэг	Narantsetseg	Sun flower	f	8,755
Ганбаатар	Ganbaatar	Steel hero	m	8,651
Мөнхцэцэг	Mönkhtsetseg	Eternal flower	f	8,613
Мөнхбат	Mönkhbat	Eternal firmity	m	8,612
Батжаргал	Batjargal	Firm happiness	m	8,570
Мөнх-Эрдэнэ	Mönkh-Erdene	Eternal jewel	m	8,467
