= Şükrü =

Şükrü is a masculine given name of Turkish origin. Notable people with the name include:

== Given name ==
- Şükrü Halûk Akalın (born 1956), Turkish academic and bureaucrat
- Şükrü Altın (born 1956), Turkish historian, novelist, educator, and painter
- Şükrü Balcı (1929–1993), Turkish police officer
- Şükrü Birand (1944–2019), Turkish footballer
- Şükrü Elekdağ (born 1924), Turkish diplomat, academic, and politician
- Şükrü Ersoy (1931–2026), Turkish footballer
- Şükrü Naili Gökberk (1876–1936), Ottoman Army officer
- Şükrü Gülesin (1922–1977), Turkish footballer and journalist
- Şükrü Sina Gürel (born 1950), Turkish diplomat and politician
- Şükrü Kaya (1883–1959), Turkish politician
- Şükrü Koçak (1886–1961), Turkish politician
- Şükrü Âli Ögel (1886–1973), Turkish politician
- Şükrü Okan (1880–1957), Turkish Army officer and politician
- Şükrü Özyıldız (born 1988), Turkish actor
- Şükrü Enis Regü (1922–1974), Turkish poet
- Şükrü Sanus (born 1966), Turkish sailor
- Şükrü Saracoğlu (1887–1953), Turkish politician
- Şükrü Sarıışık (born 1945), Turkish Army general
- Şükrü Uzuner (born 1969), Turkish footballer
- Şükrü Yürür (1944–2023), Turkish economist and politician

== See also ==
- Şükrü Saracoğlu Stadium, football stadium in the Kadıköy district of Istanbul, Turkey
- Shukri
