= Altyn (disambiguation) =

Altyn is a historical currency of Russia.

Altyn may also refer to:

- altın, (алтын) the word for gold in several Turkic languages
  - Altyn Kyran (Алтын Кыран Golden Eagle), an order of the Republic of Kazakhstan
  - Altyn-Köl (Golden Lake), a lake in the Altai Republic, Russia
  - Altan Orda, the Mongolian for Golden Horde
  - Altyn-Depe (Golden Hill), a site in Turkmenistan
  - Altyn-Tagh range, Northwestern China
- Altyn Tolobas, a novel by Boris Akunin
- Altyn (helmet), a titanium helmet developed in the Soviet Union.

== See also ==
- Altin
- Altın
