= Altan (name) =

- Gender: Male & female

Origin
- Languages: 1. Turkic; 2. Mongolian; 3. Irish; 4. Scottish Gaelic; 5. Swedish; 6. Danish
- Meaning: 1. "red dawn" 2. "golden" 3. "red rising sun"

Altan is a male Mongolian and Turkish given name used also as first name and a Mongolian given name. Altan means "golden" in Mongolian and "red dawn" in Turkic. The related word "Altın" is also Turkish for "golden" and a common Turkish first name.

== Given name ==
- Altan Aksoy (born 1976), a Turkish football player
- Altan Debter, an early, now lost history of the Mongols
- Altan Dinçer (1932–2010), Turkish basketball player
- Engin Altan Düzyatan (born 1979), Turkish actor
- Altan Erkekli (born 1955), a Turkish theatre and film actor
- Altan Erol (born 1983), a Turkish professional basketball player
- Altan Khan (1508–1582), a Mongol ruler (1507–1582)
- Altan Khan of the Khotgoid, a succession of rulers of north-western Mongolia in the 17th century
- Altan Öymen (1932–2025), Turkish journalist, author and politician
- Altan Telgey, a Mongol earth goddess
- Altan Tobchi, a 17th-century Mongolian chronicle written by Guush Luvsandanzan
- Altan Urag, a Mongolian folk rock band
- Altan Öncül, Turkish-Dutch economist and political personality

== Surname ==
- Ahmet Altan (born 1950), Turkish journalist and author
- Berfin Altan (born 2003), Turkish women's goalball player
- Çetin Altan (1927–2015), Turkish writer, journalist, and former member of parliament
- Francesco Tullio Altan (born 1942), Italian satire and comic book author
- Kaan Altan, a founding member of the Turkish rock band Mavi Sakal
- Kamil Altan(1924–2011), Turkish footballer.
- Mehmet Altan (born 1953), Turkish economist, columnist and writer
- Pedro Altán (born 1997), Guatemalan footballer
- Saadet İkesus Altan (1916–2007), Turkish opera singer, vocal coach and opera director

== See also ==
- Altan, Irish folk band
- Altan (disambiguation), other uses
