= Altın =

Altın is a Turkish word meaning "golden" (comparable to Mongolian "altan"). It is also a common surname. Notable people with the surname include:

== Altin ==
- Josef Altin (born 1983), British television and film actor
- Mehmet Altin (born 1959), Turkish weightlifter
- Ozlem Altin (born 1977), German Turkish visual artist

== Altın ==
- Erhan Altın (born 1956), Turkish football manager
- Fatma Damla Altın (born 2002), Turkish Paralympian female athlete
- Salih Altın (born 1987), German footballer of Turkish descent
- Şükrü Altın (born 1956), Turkish historian, novelist, educator, and painter
- Volkan Altın (born 1986), German footballer

== See also ==
- Altin, a given name
- Altan, a Mongolian given name also meaning "golden"
- Koza Altın, a Turkish gold mining company
  - Altın Koza International Film Festival
