= Haluk =

Haluk is a Turkish given name for males. People named Haluk include:

== Given name ==
- Haluk Akakçe (born 1970), Turkish artist
- Haluk Bayraktar (born 1978), Turkish engineer
- Haluk Bilginer (born 1954), Turkish actor
- Haluk Dinçer (born 1962), Turkish businessman
- Haluk Kırcı, Turkish criminal
- Haluk Koç (born 1954), Turkish politician
- Haluk Kurosman, Turkish music producer
- Haluk Levent (born 1968), Turkish musician
- Haluk Pekşen (1961–2022), Turkish lawyer, businessman and politician
- Haluk Piyes (born 1975), Turkish-German actor
- Haluk Yıldırım (born 1972), Turkish basketball player

== Middle name ==
- Halit Haluk Babacan (born 1966), Turkish sailor
- Şükrü Halûk Akalın (born 1956), Turkish academic
- Ümit Haluk Bayülken (1921–2007), Turkish diplomat and politician
