= Bugas =

Bugas is a surname. Notable people with the surname include:

- John Bugas (1908–1982), American businessman
- Paolo Bugas (born 1994), Filipino footballer
- Pocholo Bugas (born 2001), Filipino footballer
- Theodore Bugas (1924–2022), American politician

== See also ==
- Buga (disambiguation)
- Buhas
