= Barsbold =

Barsbold is a Mongolian given name. Notable people with the name include:

- Rinchen Barsbold (1935–2025), Mongolian paleontologist and geologist
- Ulambayaryn Barsbold, Minister of the Environment for Mongolia
- Barsbold Denzen (born 1958), Mongolian sculptor and artist, son of Rinchen Barsbold
