= Altan =

Altan may refer to:

- Altan (name), including a list of people with the name
- Altan (band), a folk music group from Donegal
- Altan (album), a 1987 album by Mairéad Ní Mhaonaigh and Frankie Kennedy
- Altan Jalab, a village in Afghanistan
- Altan (river), stretch of the lower course of the Kuranakh-Yuryakh river, Yakutia, Russia

== See also ==
- Atlan (disambiguation)
