= Atlan =

Atlan may refer to:

- Atlan Anien (1920–1992), Marshallese politician
- Françoise Atlan (born 1964), French singer
- Henri Atlan (born 1931), French Algerian biophysicist and philosopher
- Jean-Michel Atlan (1913–1960), French artist
- Liliane Atlan (1932–2011), French Jewish writer
- Marine Atlan, French cinematographer and director
- Sébastien Atlan (born 1984), French footballer
- Atlan (DC Comics), the ancestor and first eponymous king of the Atlanteans and son of Poseidon in DC Comics
- Atlan da Gonozal, a fictional character who appears in the German science fiction book series Perry Rhodan
- Atlan (novel), a fantasy novel by Jane Gaskell
- Science fiction series, a spinoff of the long-running German series Perry Rhodan
- Nvidia Atlan, a GPU centric semiconductor from Nvidia's Tegra/Drive series, meant for autonomous driving and other high performance computing applications

== See also ==
- Altan (disambiguation)
