= Buğa =

Buğa or Boğa means "bull" in Mongolian and Turkic languages, also transliterated as Bugha, or Buqa (via Arabic script). It may refer to:

== People ==
- Bugha al-Kabir or Bugha the Elder (died 862), prominent Turkish general in the Abbasid Caliphate
- Bugha al-Sharabi or Bugha al-Saghir or Bugha the Younger (died 868), prominent Turkish general in the Abbasid Caliphate
- Tala Buga, the khan of Golden Horde between 1287 and 1291
- Kitbuqa Noyan (Kit-Bugha), a lieutenant and confidant of the Mongol Ilkhan Hulagu
- Buqa, a Mongol lord who was instrumental in sweeping Arghun Khan to power as the fourth Il-Khan of Iran in 1284
- Buqa Temür, a khan of the Chagatai Khanate (1272?-1282)
- Esen Buqa I, a Khan of the Chagatai Khanate (1310-c. 1318)
- Esen Buqa II (died 1462), a Khan of Moghulistan from 1429 until his death
- Toghtoa Bugha, Tayisung Khan, Emperor Taizong of Northern Yuan
- Timurbugha (az-Zahir Timurbugha), a Burji dynasty sultan (1468-1468)
- Bugha (gamer), an American streamer and esports player from Pennsylvania, derived from a mashup of the Pennsylvania county Bucks County and the Indian town Meghalaya

== See also ==
- Buga (disambiguation)
