= Selma Emiroğlu =

Turkish cartoonist

Selma Emiroğlu Aykan
- Born: Selma Emiroğlu; 17 May 1928; Istanbul, Turkey
- Died: 4 October 2011 (aged 83); Tutzing, Germany
- Occupation: Cartoonist
- Notable work: Kara Kedi Çetesi

Selma Emiroğlu Aykan (17 May 1928 – 4 October 2011) was the first female cartoonist in Turkey. She was also an opera singer.

== Life ==
She was born in Istanbul on 17 May 1928. She studied Üsküdar American Academy, but before graduation, she left the school and entered the Conservatoire of Istanbul Municipality.

In 1963, she married Aydın Aykan and moved to Berlin, West Germany. She gave birth to a daughter named Aylin. She died on 4 October 2011 in Tutzing, Germany.

== Cartoonist career ==
During her childhood, she was fond of drawing. Her mother sent some of her drawings to Cemal Nadir Güler, a renowned cartoonist of the 1940s. Her first cartoon appeared on the Amcabey periodical of Güler as early as 1943. When Doğan Kardeş, the children's periodical began to be published by Kâzım Taşkent, the founder of Yapı Kredi Bank, she began drawing for the publication.

She created the funnies Kara Kedi Çetesi ("The Black Cat Gang"). In 1949, when the Indian prime minister Jawaharlal Nehru sent an elephant to Turkey as a present for Turkish children, Emiroğlu drew a welcome cartoon on the cover page of Doğan Kardeş.

== Music ==
She was one of the sopranos of the Istanbul Opera. She played the leading role in La Traviata in Istanbul. While in Germany, she concentrated more on music.
