= Buga =

Buga may refer to:

- Buga (surname)

== Places ==
- Mount Buga, an inactive volcano in Zamboanga del Sur province, the Philippines
- Buga (barangay), a barangay in San Miguel Municipality, Bulacan, Philippines
- Buga, Valle del Cauca, city and municipality in the Colombian department of Valle del Cauca

== Other uses ==
- Buga (god), Evenk god of the heaven
- Hungarian Buga Pigeon
- BUGA, the biannual Federal horticulture show in Germany
- Buga-khwe or Buga-kxoe, a dialect of Khwe language
- "Buga" (song), a 2022 song by Kizz Daniel
- Buhay, musical instrument also known as buga

== See also ==
- Bugas
- Buğa (disambiguation)
