= Altin =

Altin is a given Albanian name. Notable people with the name include:

- Altin Bytyçi (born 2001), Kosovan footballer
- Altin Çuko (1974–2025), Albanian former footballer
- Altin Grbović (born 1986), Serbian footballer
- Altin Haxhi (born 1975), Albanian former footballer
- Altin Hoxha (born 1990), Albanian footballer
- Altin Kaftira (born 1972), Albanian former danseur
- Altin Kryeziu (born 2002), Kosovan footballer
- Altin Lala (born 1975), Albanian former footballer
- Altin Masati, Albanian footballer
- Altin Rraklli (born 1970), Albanian former footballer
- Altin Rrica (born 1973), Albanian former footballer
- Altin Sufa (born 1988), Albanian cyclist
- Altin Zeqiri (born 2000), Kosovan footballer

== See also ==
- Altın
