= Sarangerel =

Sarangerel (Mongolian: Сарангэрэл) is a feminine name of Mongolian origin. It comes from Mongolian: саран, lit. 'moon' and Mongolian: гэрэл, lit. 'light'.

== Notable individuals ==
- Davaajantsangiin Sarangerel (born 1963), Mongolian photographer and politician
- Tumbish Sarangerel, a contestant on Mongolia's Next Top Model (Season 1)

== See also ==
- Mongolian names
