= Şükrü Enis Regü =

Şükrü Enis Regü (1922 in Çankırı, Turkey – 19 March 1974 in Istanbul, Turkey) was best known for his poetry for children. He was one of the rare writers whose approach to children's world was with an almost childish sensitivity, innocence and naivete. His work includes many tales, fables and compilations.

He finished elementary and middle-school in Çankırı before graduating from Haydarpaşa Lyceum High School in Istanbul. Early in his career as a journalist, he became the editor of Doğan Kardeş Dergisi, a children's magazine. During this period, his poetry and prose was published by the publishing houses of Nebioğlu and Atlas in their literary periodicals. Later he settled in Ankara as the Children's Editor for Ulus newspaper, the leading national daily of that period.

Regü established the Yankı publishing house. He created "Children's corner" sections in various newspapers during this period. Through Milliyet Publications, he edited many interesting and enchanting legends and tales.

His first appearance in the literary scene was as a child-poet with the publishing of his poetry and other writings in Vakit daily newspaper in 1931. Later his poetry was published in many periodicals, including Servet-i Fünuın, Uyanış (Awakening), Varlık (Existence), Hep Bu Topraktan (From This Earth), Fikirler (Thoughts), Diyelim (Let Us Say), Güney (South), and Hisar.
