= Altan Telgey =

Altan Telgey is a Mongol earth goddess. Her relationship to Etugen is unclear. In Mongolian, Delkhey (Delkhi) literally means earth. In modern Mongolian songs, the term Altan Delkhi is commonly mentioned.
