= Buga (surname) =

Buga is a surname. Notable people with this surname include:

- Ion Buga (born 1935), Moldovan politician
- Kazimieras Būga (1879–1924), Lithuanian linguist and philologist
- Konstantin Buga (born 1985), German boxer
- Mihai Buga (born 1977), Romanian footballer
- Mircea Buga (born 1968), Moldovan politician
- Mugurel Buga (born 1977), Romanian footballer
- Nataliya Buga (born 1971), Russian alpine skier
- Victor Buga (born 1994), Moldovan footballer
