= Oghul Qaimish =

Regent of the Mongol Empire from 1248 to 1251

Regent of the Mongol Empire
- Regency: 1248–1251
- Predecessor: Güyük Khan
- Successor: Möngke Khan
- Died: 1251
- Spouse: Güyük Khan
- Issue: Khoja; Naqu

Oghul Qaimish (Mongolian: ᠤᠤᠭᠠᠯ ᠬᠠᠶᠢᠮᠢᠰᠢ, Огул Каймиш; c. 1200s–1251) was the wife of Güyük Khan, the third ruler of the Mongol Empire, and was herself the nominal regent of the empire between Güyük's death in 1248 and the accession of Möngke Khan in 1251.

Oghul Qaimish was born into the Merkit tribe and married Güyük in the 1220s. She played little role in his political activities either before or during his time as khan. After his death, her rule was ineffective and confused, with her sons Khoja and Naqu often acting in opposition to her. Meanwhile, her political opponents Batu Khan and Sorghaghtani Beki comprehensively outmanoeuvred her by having Sorghaghtani's son Möngke elected as khan in 1250. After his accession, Oghul Qaimish was implicated in a failed coup attempt by Naqu—in retaliation to her refusal to submit, Möngke had her imprisoned, allegedly tortured and, after a show trial, executed.

== Biography ==
The precise year of Oghul Qaimish's birth is unknown: the historian Anne Broadbridge estimates, based on the approximate date of her marriage, that she was born in the early 1200s. Her personal name, of Turkic origin, meant "[We] Were Searching for a Boy", reflecting her parents' presumed frustration at their lack of a male child. The name also belonged to one of Tolui's secondary wives.

Oghul Qaimish was born into the Merkit tribe, which was subjugated in 1204 by Genghis Khan. The Merkits were initially allowed to keep their tribal identity, but Genghis heavily punished them after they rebelled in 1216: his general Subutai defeated and killed the Merkit leaders in 1218, and the surviving members of the tribe were dispersed as slaves among Genghis' loyal subjects. Oghul Qaimish's male family members are unlikely to have survived, while her female relatives would not have provided useful connections in Mongol society.

In the early 1220s, Oghul Qaimish was given as a wife to Güyük. He was the eldest son of Genghis' third son and heir Ögedei and his principal wife Töregene, who had also been born as a member of the Merkit tribe. As a member of a divided tribe who brought few political connections to the marriage, Oghul Qaimish was a poor strategic match for Güyük: Broadbridge speculates that Töregene may have purposefully overlooked more reputable brides because of her own Merkit heritage. Güyük and Oghul Qaimish had two sons named Khoja and Naqu, but it is not certain if she also gave birth to Güyük's three known daughters: Elmish, Babaqan/Babaqal, and one whose name is unknown.

Oghul Qaimish is not known to have had any influence on Güyük's political life after his father became khan of the Mongol Empire in 1229. From 1235 Güyük was a leader of the western campaign against the Kievan Rus, during which he insulted and gained the enmity of Batu Khan, the most senior descendant of Genghis. After Ögedei's death in December 1241, Töregene assumed authority over the empire and remained in control for five years. By 1246, Güyük had overcome the candidatures of other potential successors, such as Ögedei's favourite grandson Shiremun, and he acceded to the throne. In late 1247, he set out westwards with a large force, officially intending to continue expanding the empire; some alleged however that his actual target was his old foe Batu. Güyük's health deteriorated en route and he died at Qum-Senggir in April 1248.

=== Regency ===
At the suggestion of Batu and Ögedei's influential sister-in-law Sorghaghtani Beki, Oghul Qaimish took the position of regent with the support of Qadaq, Güyük's former tutor, and the officials Chinqai and Bala. She sent out messengers announcing the khan's death and took his body to his lands (near modern Tacheng) for burial. Unlike Töregene, Oghul Qaimish was not confident in politics—she had no obvious political objectives, generally neglected the administration of the empire, and reportedly spent much of her time consorting with shamans. She was soon comprehensively outmanoeuvred.

Batu immediately announced that he would hold the succession kurultai (lit. 'assembly') at his camp near Issyk-Kul in modern Kyrgyzstan, explaining that his bad gout and weak horses prevented him travelling to the Mongol heartland. This was a pretext for ensuring the kurultai would be more favourable to his preferred successor—Sorghaghtani's son Möngke. Many prominent Mongols, angry that the kurultai was not held in their homeland, did not attend—these included Oghul Qaimish, who merely sent Bala as a representative. Her sons Khoja and Naqu attended only briefly, before leaving their own representative; the historian Peter Jackson has theorised that Batu misled them with favourable assurances. They were acting independently from their mother, who lent her support to Shiremun.

The kurultai began in mid-1250. Speaking on behalf of Oghul Qaimish, Bala argued in favour of Shiremun's candidacy but was unable to avert the selection of Möngke. Oghul Qaimish and most of the other non-attendants refused to acknowledge Möngke's succession. She, Khoja, and Naqu had set up separate courts, reducing the effectiveness of their administration, with their pronouncements often contradicting each other. As regent of the empire, Oghul Qaimish could theoretically have drawn upon far greater resources than the other plotters, but her cash flow was extremely strained because she was unable to effectively collect taxes. She attempted to gain political legitimacy by interpreting the gifts of an embassy from Louis IX of France as a show of submission to her as regent, but ultimately failed to gain enough symbolic strength to organise a viable kurultai in opposition to Sorghaghtani's.

After Möngke's official coronation kurultai on 1 July 1251, Shiremun and Naqu planned a coup to unseat the new khan but their plans were foiled when a falconer stumbled across their hidden encampment and informed Möngke. Möngke intercepted and defeated the would-be ambushers and demanded that Oghul Qaimish submit to him publicly; upon her refusal, she was arrested and brought to the camp of Sorghaghtani, who was now terminally ill. There, she was stripped naked and allegedly tortured by being whipped with burning sticks of wood. After a show trial, Möngke's chief judge found Oghul Qaimish guilty of witchcraft and sentenced her to execution: she was wrapped in felt and cast into the Kherlen river to drown.

Oghul Qaimish House of Merkit (1248-1251)
Regnal titles
Preceded by Güyük Khan	Regent of the Mongol Empire; 1248–1251	Succeeded by Möngke Khan
