= Theodore Bugas =

American politician (1924–2022)

Member of the Oregon House of Representatives from the 2nd district
- In office 1977–1983

Personal details
- Born: June 5, 1924 Wamsutter, Wyoming, U.S.
- Died: August 20, 2022 (aged 98) Portland, Oregon, U.S.
- Party: Republican
- Relations: John Bugas (brother)
- Profession: Politician, businessman

Theodore Thomas Bugas (June 5, 1924 – August 20, 2022) was an American politician.

== Biography ==
He was a member of the Oregon House of Representatives. He was also a business executive and vice president of a fishery product company.

Bugas died from COVID-19 in Portland, on August 20, 2022, at the age of 98.
