= Koza Altın =

Koza Altın İşletmeleri A.Ş
- Company type: Anonim Şirket
- Traded as: BİST: KOZAL
- Industry: Precious metal
- Founded: 29 September 1989
- Headquarters: Ankara, Turkey
- Key people: Akın İpek
- Production output: ▼141,6 koz of gold; ▲78,3 koz of silver; (2023)
- Revenue: ▼$382.85 million (2023)
- Owner: Koza İpek Holding
- Website: kozaaltin.com.tr

Koza Altın İşletmeleri A.Ş is a Turkish gold mining company that operates a number of mines across Turkey.

== History ==
Founded in 1989 as a branch of the former Australian Normandy Mining corporation, in 2005 Koza İpek bought all the company's shares. In February 2010, the company went public with an initial public offering of ₺2,200,000,000. By 2012, the company had a market value of around ₺5,000,000,000.

== Gold mines ==
Since 1989, the company operates the Ovacık gold mine and processing center near Bergama, Aegean Region. In 2006, Koza Altın opened the Küçükdere gold mine near Havran, Marmara region, with ore being processed in Ovacık. Operations in the Mastra gold mine and the company's second processing center near Gümüşhane, Black Sea Region, started in 2009.

In Central Anatolia, the Kaymaz gold mine with a third processing center in Sivrihisar, was established in 2011. In a fourth processing center at Himmetdede gold mine near Kocasinan, commercial production of gold has commenced in 2015.

As of December 2014, Koza Altın held 57 operating licenses and 281 exploration licenses all over Turkey. Also, a joint venture with Canadian Medgold Resources conducts explorations for gold and silver in Portugal.

== Literature ==
- "2014 Operational Report & Financials" (PDF). Koza Altın. 2015.
