= Altin Kaftira =

Albanian dancer

Altin Kaftira (born 1972 in Albania) is a former danseur with the Dutch National Ballet in Amsterdam, Netherlands. He danced with the Ballet from 1995 on, and from 2000 to 2007 was the Ballet's principal dancer (working with choreographers such as Hans van Manen, Rudi van Dantzig, Jerome Robbins, Alexei Ratmansky, Christopher Wheeldon and Ted Brandsen), and has danced in almost a dozen George Balanchine ballets. In 2007, he left to pursue a career as a filmmaker. One of his first film assignments was the production and direction of the 75th anniversary gala for Hans van Manen.

In 2002 the then-president of Albania, Rexhep Meidani, awarded Kaftira with the title of Art's Ambassador of the Nation. In an interview with Kaftira just before his retirement, Dutch critic and writer Herman Stevens, in an article in the Dutch magazine HP/De Tijd, called him an audience favorite, a star possessing the most charisma of any dancer at the National Ballet.

== Kaftira as principal dancer, Dutch National Ballet ==
- February - March 2000: Apollo in Apollon musagète (Igor Stravinsky), Muziektheater, Amsterdam
- May 2001: Twilight (music by John Cage), Sadler's Wells Theatre, London
- December 2004: Petrushka in Petrushka (Sergei Diaghilev), Muziektheater, Amsterdam
- 2005: Don Giovanni in Don Giovanni (music by Mozart, choreography by Krzysztof Pastor), Muziektheater, Amsterdam
- August 2005: the husband in The Concert (music by Frédéric Chopin, choreography by Jerome Robbins), Edinburgh International Festival, Edinburgh Playhouse
- November 2006, Vier Letzte Lieder (music by Richard Strauss, choreography by Rudi van Dantzig), Sadler's Wells Theatre, London
- August 2006: Into the Agape (choreography by Altin Naska), Atheneaum Theatre, Chicago
- 2006: Romeo in Romeo and Juliet (music by Sergei Prokofiev, choreography by Rudi van Dantzig), Hong Kong
