= Doğan Kardeş =

Turkish children's magazine and publisher

Doğan Kardeş (literally 'Brother Doğan') was the name of a publishing company and a periodical for children in Turkey.

The periodical and the company were named after Doğa, a 10-year-old boy studying in a school in Flims, Switzerland. He died during an avalanche on 10 April 1939. His father, Kâzım Taşkent, who was the founder of Yapı ve Kredi Bankası established a publishing company to commemorate his son.

== Doğan Kardeş Periodical ==
The publishing company began publishing a periodical for the children named Doğan Kardeş Dergisi under the editorship of Vedat Nedim Tör. The periodical was published in three distinct periods. The first period was between April 1945 and July 1978 (1174 issues). The second publication term was between October 1988 and December 1993 (63 issues) and the third term was between February 2008 and March 2011 (38 issues). Doğan Kardeş supported many children who later on made names as important musicians like Suna Kan and İdil Biret.

In 1949 Indian prime minister Jawaharlal Nehru sent an elephant to Japan. Next year Doğan Kardeş organized a campaign to import an elephant to Turkish zoos and published an open letter to Nehru. Children were encouraged to draw cartoons of an elephant in Turkey. The campaign was successful and Nehru sent a 2-year old elephant as a present to Turkish children. It was named Mohini ("sugar elephant"). The cover of Doğan Kardeş dated 4 May 1950 featured a caricature created by Selma Emiroğlu, the first female cartoonist in Turkey. Its theme was the welcoming ceremony of Mohini.

== Other periodicals ==
The other periodic publications of the Doğan Kardeş Publication Company were Aile ("Family") between 1947 and 1952, 23 issues; Hayat ("Life") between 1956 and 1979, the first intaglio magazine of Turkey (editor Şevket Rado); Bizler ("We" for Yapı Kredi people) in 1973; Sanat Dünyamız ("Our Art World") in 1974: and Yapı Kredi Economic Review (in English) in 1986.

== Books ==
In addition to the periodicals many internationally well known titles were translated to Turkish and published by the Doğan Kardeş Publishing Company. The first example was 17 stories from Leo Tolstoy in 1946. Up to 1988 over 500 books were published. Some of these were Atlantis by Hans Dominik, Don Quixote by Miguel de Cervantes, Gulliver's Travels by Jonathan Swift, The Kon-Tiki Expedition: By Raft Across the South Seas by Thor Heyerdahl, The Little Prince by Antoine de Saint-Exupéry and Book of Dede Korkut simplified by Eflatun Cem Güney.

== Yapı Kredi Books ==
After the shares of the bank were sold, the publishing company changed its name. After 1989 it was renamed as Yapı Kredi Publishing Company.
