= Şükrü Birand =

Turkish footballer (1944–2019)

Şükrü Birand (1 January 1944 – 28 June 2019) was a Turkish footballer who played as a right-back for Fenerbahçe.

== Career ==
Born in Ankara, Birand started his professional career with Toprakspor in 1960–61 and then transferred to PTT Ankara (1961–1964). He then transferred to Fenerbahçe, where he played for ten years from 1964 to 1974 and scored seven goals in 317 matches for the club.

He graduated from Istanbul Economics and Administrative Sciences Academy.
