= Nohai =

Nohai means "dog" in Mongolian language. People with this name include:

- Nogai Khan, Mongol general of the Golden Horde and descendant of Chinggis Khan
- Florin Nohai (born 1981), Romanian footballer
