= Möngke Khan =

Khan of the Mongol Empire from 1251 to 1259

- Möngke enthroned. Tarikh-i Jahangushay-i Juvaini, 1438, Shiraz

Khagan of the Mongol Empire
- Reign: 1 July 1251 – 11 August 1259
- Coronation: 1 July 1251
- Predecessor: Güyük Khan; Oghul Qaimish (regent)
- Successor: Ariq Böke (claimant); Kublai Khan
- Born: 11 January 1209; Mongol Empire
- Died: 11 August 1259 (aged 50); Sichuan, Southern Song
- Burial: Unknown, presumptively Burkhan Khaldun
Names
- Mongolian:ᠮᠥᠩᠬᠡ Мөнх Möngke
Posthumous name
- Emperor Huansu (Chinese: 桓肅皇帝) (conferred in 1266)
Temple name
- Xianzong (Chinese: 憲宗) (conferred in 1266)
- House: Borjigin
- Father: Tolui
- Mother: Sorghaghtani Beki

Möngke Khan (also Möngke Khagan or Möngke; (Note: Mongolian: ᠮᠥᠩᠬᠡ Мөнх, Mönkh, pronounced [mɵŋx]; Chinese: 蒙哥; pinyin: Ménggē) 11 January 1209 – 11 August 1259) was the fourth khagan of the Mongol Empire, ruling from 1 July 1251 to 11 August 1259. He was the first Khagan from the Toluid line, and made significant reforms to improve the administration of the Empire during his reign. Under Möngke, the Mongols conquered Iraq and Syria as well as the Dali Kingdom (modern Yunnan).

Möngke's death in 1259 without a designated successor led to the four-year Toluid Civil War between his two younger brothers, Kublai Khan and Ariq Böke. Though Kublai Khan eventually won, the succession war and the subsequent Kaidu–Kublai war essentially resulted in the permanent division of the Mongol Empire.

== Early life ==
Möngke was born on 11 January 1209, as the eldest son of Genghis Khan's teenaged son Tolui and Sorghaghtani Beki. Teb Tengri Khokhcuu, a shaman, claimed to have seen in the stars a great future for the child and bestowed on him the name Möngke, meaning 'eternal' in Mongolian. His uncle Ögedei Khan's childless queen Angqui raised him at her orda (nomadic palace). Ögedei instructed Persian scholar Idi-dan Muhammed to teach writing to Möngke.

On his way back home after the Mongol conquest of the Khwarazmian Empire, Genghis Khan performed a ceremony on his grandsons Möngke and Kublai after their first hunting in 1224 near the Ili River. Möngke was fifteen years old, and with his brother, Kublai, killed a rabbit and an antelope. Their grandfather smeared fat from the killed animals onto their middle fingers following the Mongol tradition.

In 1230, Möngke went to war for the first time, following Ögedei and his father Tolui into battle against the Jin dynasty. Tolui died in 1232, and Ögedei appointed Sorghaghtani head of the Toluid appanage. Following the Mongol custom, Möngke inherited at least one of his father's wives, Oghul-Khoimish of the Oirat clan. Möngke deeply loved her and gave special favor to her elder daughter, Shirin.

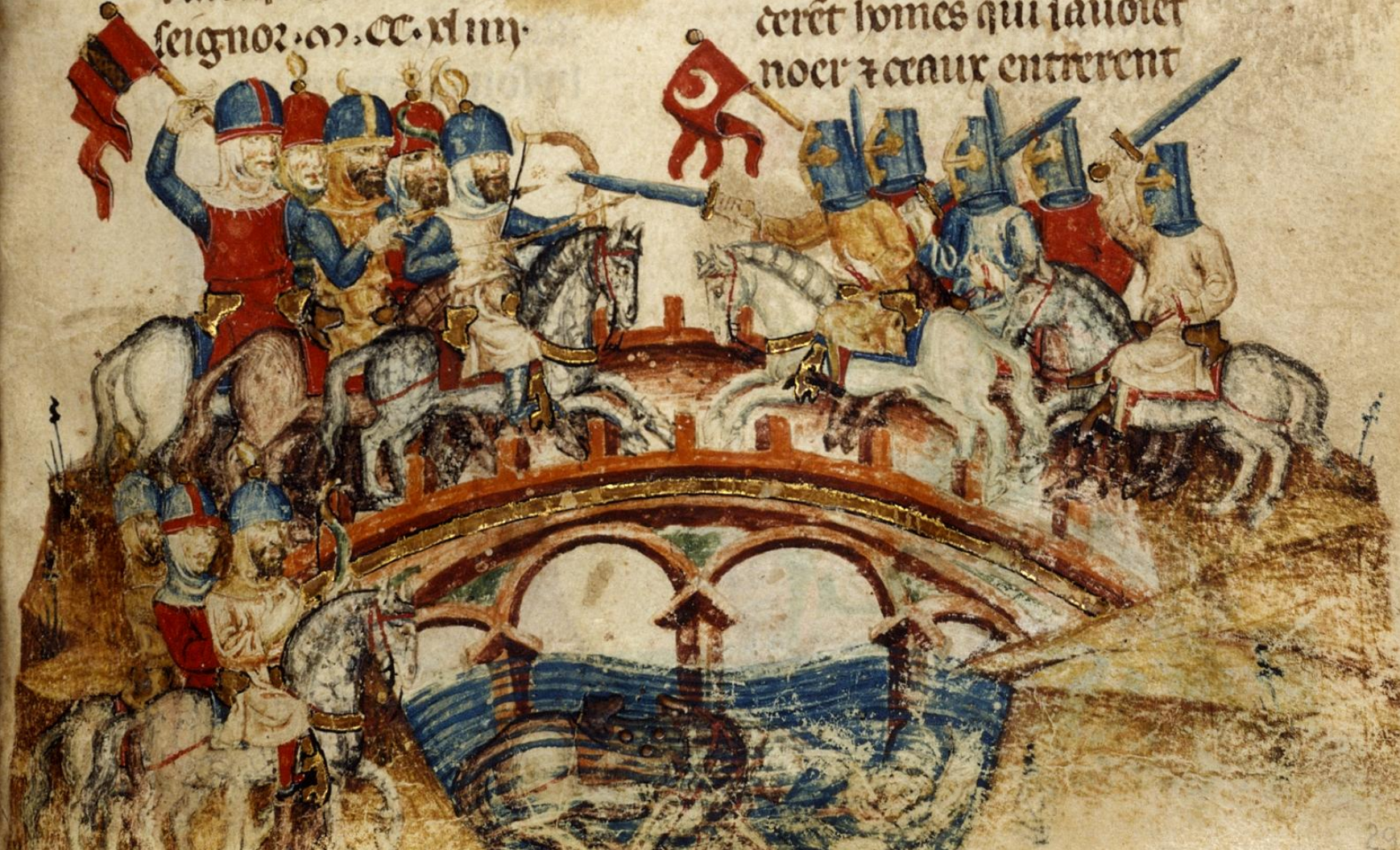
The 1241 Battle of Mohi, in which Möngke might have participated.

Ögedei dispatched him along with his relatives to attack the Kipchaks, Kievan Rus', and Bulgars in the west in 1235. When the most formidable Kipchak chief, Bachman, fled to an island in the Volga delta Möngke crossed the river and captured him. When he ordered Bachman to bend down on his knees, Bachman refused and was executed by Möngke's brother Bujek. Möngke also engaged in hand-to-hand combat during the Mongol invasion of Rus'. While his cousins, Shiban and Büri, went to Crimea, Möngke and Kadan, a son of Ögedei, were ordered to reduce the tribes in the Caucasus. The Mongols captured the Alan capital Maghas and massacred its inhabitants. Many chiefs of the Alans and Circassians surrendered to Möngke. After the invasion of Eastern Europe, Möngke would bring them back to Mongolia. He also participated in the Siege of Kiev (1240). Möngke was apparently taken by the splendour of Kiev and offered the city surrender, but his envoys were killed. After Batu's army joined Möngke's, they sacked the city. He also fought alongside Batu at the Battle of Mohi. In the summer of 1241, before the premature end of the campaign. Möngke returned home after his uncle Ögedei recalled him in the winter of 1240–41. However, Ögedei died in December 1241.

In 1246, Temüge, Genghis Khan's sole remaining brother, unsuccessfully tried to seize the throne without confirmation by a kurultai. The new Khagan Güyük entrusted the delicate task of trying the Odchigin ('keeper of the hearth' – a title given to both of Genghis' younger brothers) to Möngke and Orda Khan, the eldest brother of Batu. Güyük eventually died en route to the west in 1248 and Batu and Möngke emerged as the main contenders.

== Toluid revolution ==
Following his mother Sorghaghtani's advice, Möngke went to the Golden Horde to meet Batu, who was afflicted with gout. Batu decided to support his election and called a kurultai at Ala Qamaq. The leader of the families of Genghis Khan's brothers, and several important generals, came to the kurultai. Güyük's sons Naqu and Khoja attended briefly but then left. Despite vehement objections from Bala, Oghul Qaimish's scribe, the kurultai approved Möngke. Given its limited attendance and location, this kurultai was of questionable validity. Batu sent Möngke under the protection of his brothers, Berke and Tuqa-temur, and his son Sartaq to assemble a formal kurultai at Kodoe Aral in Mongolia. When Sorghaghtani and Berke organized a second kurultai on 1 July 1251, the assembled throng proclaimed Möngke the Great Khan of the Mongol Empire, and a few of the Ögedeid and Chagatayid princes, such as his cousin Kadan and the deposed khan Qara Hülegü, acknowledged the decision.

Shortly thereafter, Oghul's son Khoja and Ögedei's favorite grandson Shiremun came to "pay homage" to Möngke as the new ruler, but they brought the entire army of the Ögedei faction with them. Möngke's Kankali falconer, Kheshig, discovered the preparations for the attack and told his lord. At the end of the investigation under his father's loyal servant Menggesar noyan, he found his relatives guilty but at first wanted to give them mercy as written in the Great Yassa. Möngke's officials opposed it and then he began to punish his relatives. The trials took place in all parts of the empire from Mongolia and China in the east to Afghanistan and Iraq in the west. Möngke and Batu's brother Berke therefore arranged to have Oghul accused of using black magic against Möngke. After she was arrested and questioned by Sorghaghtani, Oghul Qaimish was sewn up into a sack and tossed into a river and drowned, the traditional Mongol punishment for using black magic. Estimates of the deaths of aristocrats, officials, and Mongol commanders include Eljigidei, Yesü Möngke, Büri, and Shiremun and range from 77 to 300. However, most of the princes descended from Genghis Khan who were involved in the plot were given some form of exile. The anti-Möngke plot of a Uyghur scribe, Bala, and the Idiqut Salindi (the monarch of the Uyghurs) was discovered and they were publicly executed. After his accession to the throne in 1251, Möngke announced that he would follow his ancestors but would not imitate the ways of other countries. To increase his legitimacy, in 1252 he retroactively awarded his father the title of Ikh Khagan. Möngke shared the western part of the empire with his ally Batu Khan, ensuring the unity of the empire. Möngke's mother Sorghaghtani died in 1252.

After the defeat of the Ögedeid and Chagataid families, Möngke eliminated their estates and assigned acquiescent family members new territories either in Turkestan or in northwestern China. After the bloody purge, Möngke ordered a general amnesty for prisoners and captives. In another move to consolidate his power, Möngke gave his brothers Kublai and Hulagu supervisory powers in North China and Iran. Rumours spread that his brother Kublai founded a de facto independent ulus (district), and perhaps took for himself some of the tax receipts that should by rights be coming to Karakorum. In 1257 the Emperor sent two tax inspectors to audit Kublai's official. They found fault, listed 142 breaches of regulations, accused Chinese officials, and even had some executed; Kublai's office was abolished. Möngke's authority took over the collection of all taxes in Kublai's estates. As his Confucian and Buddhist advisers pointed out, Kublai first sent his wives to the court of Khagan and then appealed to Möngke in person. They embraced in tears and Möngke forgave his brother.

== Administrative ethos ==
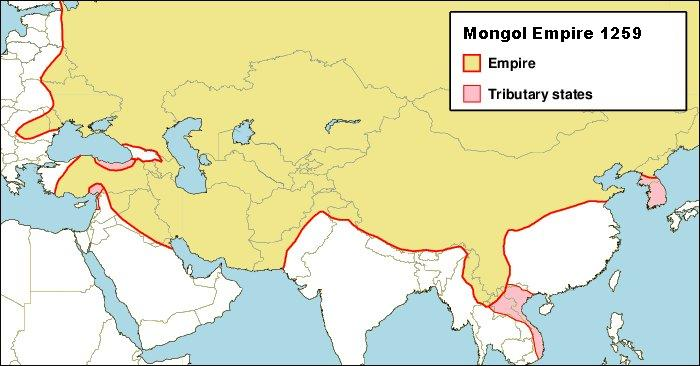
The Mongol Empire during the reign of Möngke

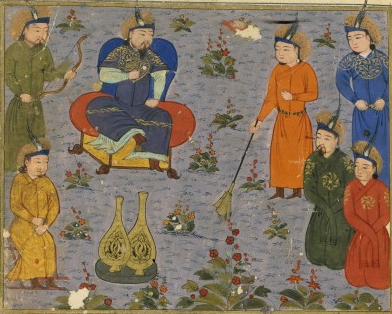
Mengeser Noyan

Möngke drafted his own decrees and kept close watch on their revision. Möngke forbade practices of extravagant costs of the Borjigin and non-Borjigid nobles. He also limited gifts to the princes, converting them into regular salaries, and made the merchants subject to taxes. Möngke limited notorious abuses and sent imperial investigators to supervise the business of the merchants who were sponsored by the Mongols. He prohibited them from using the imperial relay stations, yam (route), and paizas, tablets that gave the bearer authority to demand goods and services from civilian populations. With Güyük dead, many local officials no longer wanted to pay off the paper drafts used by Güyük. Möngke recognized that if he did not meet the financial obligations of Güyük, it would make merchants reluctant to continue business with the Mongols. Möngke paid out all drafts drawn by high ranking Mongol elites to these merchants. Ata-Malik Juvayni stated, "And from what book of history has it been read or heard...that a king paid the debt of another king?" The generals and princes (including his son) who allowed their troops to plunder civilians without authorization were repeatedly punished by Möngke Khan. He used North Chinese, Muslim, and Uyghur officials. The Khagan's chief judge (darughachi) was the Jait-Jalayir official Menggeser, while the chief scribe was the Bulghai of the Keraites, who was a Christian. Nine of the 16 chief provincial officials of Möngke Khan were certainly Muslims. He reappointed Güyük's three officials: Mahmud Yalavach in China, Masud Beg in Turkestan, and Arghun Aqa of the Oirat in Iran. Möngke separated the position of the great judge at court from that of chief scribe.

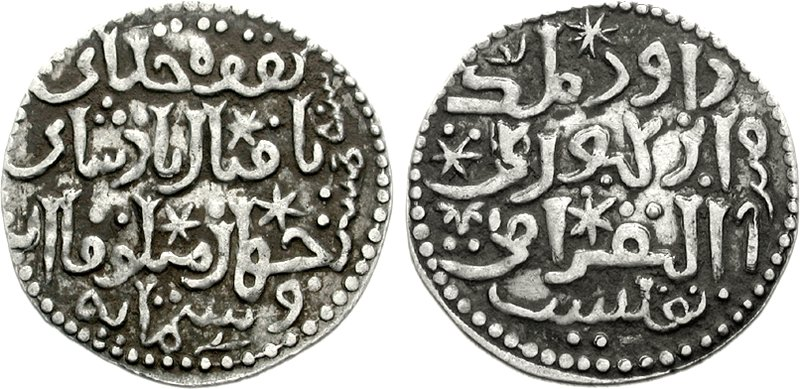
"Struck by the Georgian King David in the name of his overlord Möngke, by the power of Heaven" (Persian, dated 1253)

In 1253, Möngke established the Department of Monetary affairs to control the issuance of paper money in order to eliminate the over-issue of the currency by Mongol and non-Mongol nobles since the reign of Great Khan Ögedei. His authority established united measure based on sukhe or silver ingot, however, the Mongols allowed their foreign subjects to mint coins in the denominations and use weight they traditionally used. During the reigns of Ögedei, Güyük, and Möngke, Mongol coinage increased with gold and silver coinage in Central Asia and copper and silver coins in the Caucasus, Iran, and Bolghar.

Between 1252 and 1259, Möngke conducted a census of the Mongol Empire, including Iran, Afghanistan, Georgia, Armenia, Russia, Central Asia, and North China. While the census of China was completed in 1252, Novgorod in the far north-west was not counted until winter 1258–1259. There was an uprising in Novgorod against Mongol rule in 1257, but Alexander Nevsky forced the city to submit to the Mongol census and taxation. The new census counted not only households but also the number of men aged 15–60 and the number of fields, livestock, vineyards, and orchards. Within the civilian register craftsmen were listed separately, while in the military registers auxiliary and regular households were distinguished. Clergy of the approved religions were separated and not counted. When the new register was completed, one copy was sent to Karakorum and one copy kept for the local administration. Möngke tried to create a fixed poll tax collected by imperial agents that could be forwarded to the needy units. Initially, the maximum rate was fixed at 10–11 gold dinars in the Middle East and 6–7 taels of silver in China. Protests from the landlord classes reduced this relatively low rate to 6–7 dinars and taels. Some officials raised the top rate on the wealthy of 500 dinars. While the reform did not lighten the tax burden, it made the payments more predictable. Even so, the census and the regressive taxation it facilitated sparked popular riots and resistance in the western districts.

In 1259, the Georgian king, David VI, revolted, unsuccessfully, against the Mongols and then fled to Kutaisi, whence he reigned over Imereti in western Georgia as de facto separate ruler. In 1261, he gave shelter to David VII, who had later attempted to end the Mongol dominance. David Ulu made peace with the Mongols, however, and returned to Tbilisi in 1262. Möngke and Batu's official, Arghun, harshly punished the Georgian and Armenian nobles, plundering their cities and executing their prominent leaders. He divided the Georgians into six tumens. Meanwhile, Baiju crushed the rebellion of the Seljuk Sultan Kaykaus II near Ankara in 1256 and re-established Mongol authority over Eastern Turkey. By that time the Kashmiris had revolted, and Möngke appointed his generals, Sali and Takudar, to replace the court and a Buddhist master, Otochi, as darughachi to Kashmir. However, the Kashmiri king killed Otochi at Srinagar. Sali invaded again, killing the king, and put down the rebellion, after which the country remained subject to the Mongol Empire for many years.

== Religious policy ==
Möngke confirmed Güyük's appointment of Haiyun as chief of all the Buddhists in the Mongol Empire in 1251. In 1253 Namo from Kashmir was made chief of all the Buddhist monks in the empire. During the conquest of Tibet in 1252–53, all Buddhist clergy were exempted from taxation. The Tibetan Karma Pakshi, 2nd Karmapa Lama, received Möngke's patronage. Möngke had been impressed by the aged Taoist monk Qiu Chuji, who met his grandfather Genghis Khan in Afghanistan. Möngke made Li Zhichang chief of the Taoists. However, the Taoists had exploited their wealth and status by seizing Buddhist temples. Möngke demanded that the Taoists cease their denigration of Buddhism. Möngke ordered Kublai to end the clerical strife between the Taoists and Buddhists in his territory. Kublai called a conference of Taoist and Buddhist leaders in early 1258. At the conference, the Taoist claim was officially declared refuted, and Kublai forcibly converted their 237 temples to Buddhism and destroyed all copies of the fraudulent texts.

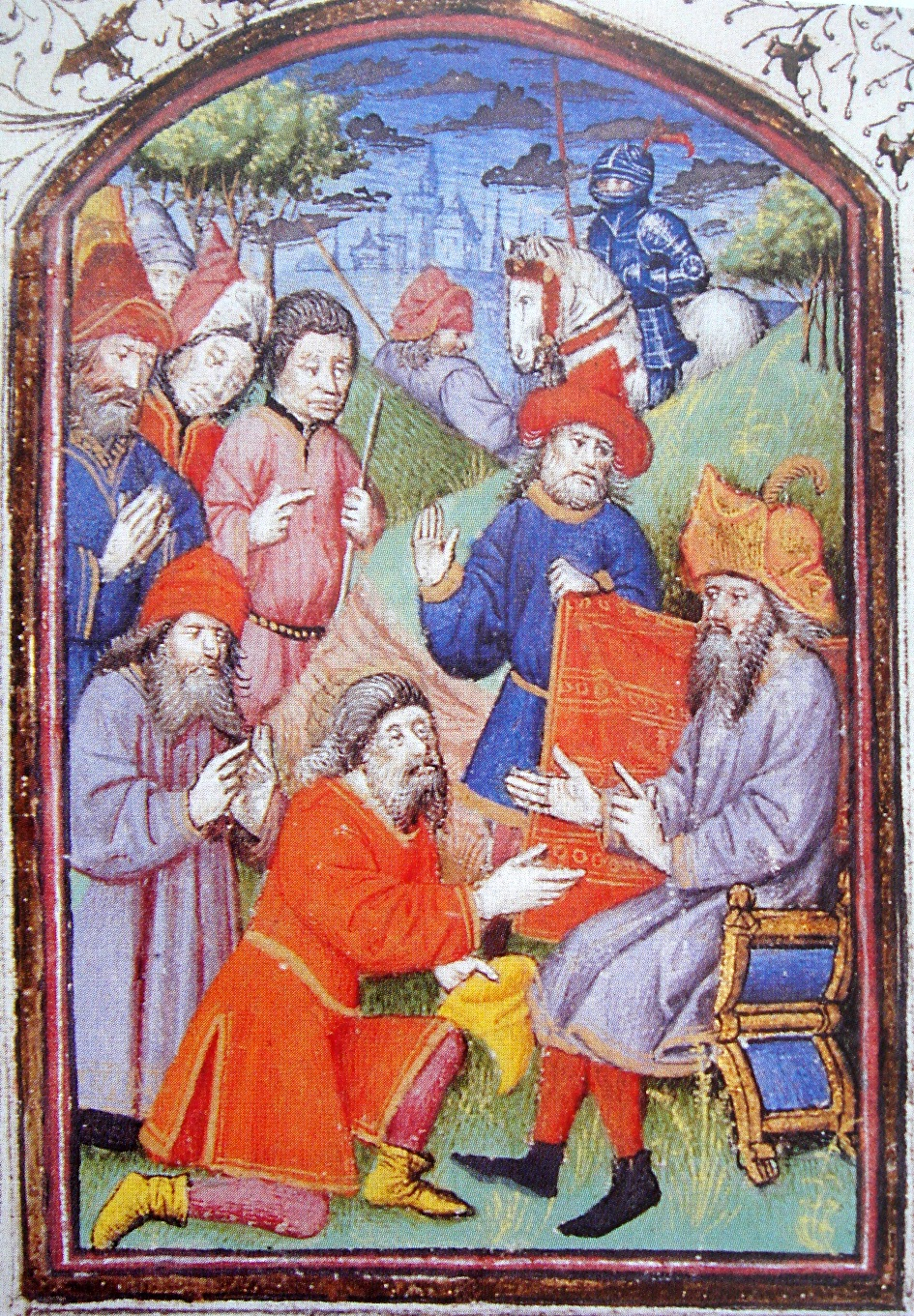
Hethum I (seated) in the Mongol court of Karakorum, "receiving the homage of the Mongols". "Histoire des Tartars", Hayton of Corycus, 1307.

Despite his conquests of the Abbasid Caliphate and the Isma'ili state, Möngke favoured Muslims. He and Hulagu made the Twelver community at Najaf an autonomous tax-exempt ecclesiastical polity. Like his predecessors, he exempted clerics, monks, churches, mosques, monasteries, and doctors from taxation.

During Möngke's reign, Louis IX of France sent William of Rubruck as a diplomat seeking an alliance with the Mongols against the Muslims. By that time Möngke's khatun Oghul-Khoimish was already dead. After making the French envoy wait for many months, Möngke officially received William Rubruck on 24 May 1254. Rubruck informed him that he had come to spread the word of Jesus. Then he stayed to help the Christians in Karakorum and attended debates among rival religions organized by the Mongols. Möngke Khan summoned William Rubruck to send him back home in 1255. He told Rubruck:

"We Mongols believe in one God, by Whom we live and die," he then continued "Just as God gave different fingers to the hand so has He given different ways to men. To you God has given the Scriptures and you Christians do not observe them". He explained God had given the Mongols their shamans. Möngke offered Louis IX his cooperation but warned all Christians that "If, when you hear and understand the decree of the eternal God, you are unwilling to pay attention and believe it...and in this confidence you bring an army against us-we know what we can do".

Ambassadors from the Latin Empire and the Empire of Nicaea came to the Mongol court to negotiate terms with Möngke Khan as well. In 1252 King Hethum I of Lesser Armenia began his journey to Mongolia. He brought many sumptuous presents and met with Möngke at Karakorum. He had an audience with Möngke on 13 September 1254, advised the Khagan on Christian matters in Western Asia, and obtained from Möngke documents guaranteeing the inviolability of his person and his kingdom. As per Armenian documents, Hethum asked the Khagan and his officials to convert to Christianity. In reply, Möngke explained that he wished his subjects to truly worship the Messiah, but he could not force them to change their religion. Möngke also informed Hethum that he was preparing to mount an attack on Baghdad and that he would remit Jerusalem to the Christians if they collaborated with him. Hethum strongly encouraged other Crusaders to follow his example and submit to Mongol overlordship, but he persuaded only his son-in-law Bohemond VI, ruler of the Principality of Antioch and County of Tripoli, who offered his own submission sometime in the 1250s. The armies of the Armenian Kingdom of Cilicia and Bohemond VI would assist Möngke's army in the West soon.

Muslim rulers also presented their submission to Möngke in Karakorum, such as the Ayyubid ruler of Mayyafariqin Al-Kamil Muhammad, who went in person in 1253 and encountered there other Muslim rulers from Mosul (envoys of Badr al'Din Lu'lu') and Mardin (Artuqids) offering their submission.

Shamans played an important role in the court and sometimes influenced the war preparation.

== Period of conquests ==
=== Capitulation of Goryeo ===
As Khagan, Möngke seemed to take the legacy of world conquest he had inherited much more seriously than had Güyük. His conquests were all directed at East Asia and the Middle East. In his first plans for additional conquests, Möngke chose Korea and the Dali Kingdom in Yunnan in 1252.

Möngke sent envoys to Goryeo, announcing his coronation in October 1251. He also demanded that King Gojong submit before him in person and to move his headquarters from Ganghwa Island to the mainland of Korea. But the Goryeo court refused to send the king because he was elderly and unable to travel so far. Möngke dispatched his envoys with specific tasks again. The envoys were well received by the Goryeo officials, but they criticized the Goryeo officials because their king did not follow his overlord Möngke's orders. Möngke ordered prince Yeku to command the army against Korea. However, a Korean in the court of Möngke convinced them to begin their campaign in July 1253. Yeku, along with Amuqan, demanded that the Goryeo court surrender. The court refused but did not resist the Mongols and gathered the peasantry into mountain fortresses and islands. Working together with the Goryeo commanders who had joined the Mongols, Jalairtai Qorchi ravaged Korea. When one of Yeku's envoys arrived, Gojong personally met him at his new palace. The king Gojong sent his stepson as hostage to Mongolia. The Mongols agreed to a truce in January 1254.

Möngke realized that the hostage was not the blood prince of the Goryeo dynasty and blamed the Goryeo court for deceiving him. Möngke's commander Jalairtai devastated much of Goryeo and took 206,800 captives in 1254. Famine and despair forced peasants to surrender to the Mongols. They established a chiliarchy office at Yonghung with local officials. Ordering defectors to build ships, the Mongols began attacking the coastal islands from 1255 on. In the Liaodong Peninsula, the Mongols formed Korean defectors into a colony of eventually 5,000 households.

In 1258, the king and the Ch'oe clan retainer Kim Chun staged a counter-coup, assassinated the head of the Ch'oe family, and sued for peace. When the Goryeo court sent the future king Wonjong of Goryeo as hostage to the Mongol court and promised to return to Gaegyeong, the Mongols withdrew from Korea.

=== Dali, Vietnam, and Tibet ===
Möngke concerned himself more with the war in China, outflanking the Song dynasty through the conquest of the Kingdom of Dali (in modern Yunnan) in 1254 and an invasion of Southeast Asia, which allowed the Mongols to invade from the north, west, and south.

Möngke Khan dispatched Kublai to the Dali Kingdom in 1253. The ruling family, Gao, resisted and murdered the Mongol envoys. The Mongols divided their forces into three. One wing rode eastward into the Sichuan basin. The second column under Uryankhadai took a difficult way into the mountains of western Sichuan. Kublai himself headed south over the grasslands, meeting up with the first column. With Uryankhadai galloping in along the lakeside from the north, Kublai took the capital city of Dali and spared the residents despite the slaying of his ambassadors. The Mongols appointed King Duan Xingzhi as local ruler and stationed a pacification commissioner there. After Kublai's departure, unrest broke out among the Black jang. By 1256, Uryankhadai, the son of Subutai, had completely pacified Dali.

Mongol invasion of Vietnam in 1257

After subjugating the Dali, Kublai sent a column south under Uriyangkhadai, the son of Subutai. Uriyangkhadai sent envoys to ask the Vietnamese for a route to attack the Southern Song, but the Tran Vietnamese imprisoned the Mongol envoys. In 1257, a Mongol column under Uriyangkhadai invaded Vietnam (then known as Đại Việt) along with his son Aju and an army of 3,000 Mongols and 10,000 Yi tribesmen. They routed the Vietnamese army and sacked the capital Thăng Long (renamed Hanoi in 1831). Uriyangkhadai executed its inhabitants for the murder of the envoys. After staying in Thăng Long for a while, the Mongols fell ill due to the unfamiliar climate. Realizing that it was time to drive the Mongols out, the Vietnamese launched a counter-attack and won the decisive battle of Dong Bo Dau, and Uriyangkhadai withdrew. To avoid further war, the Tran sent tributes to the administration of Möngke.

To strengthen his control over Tibet, Möngke made Qoridai commander of the Mongol and Han troops in Tibet in 1251. In 1252–1253, Qoridai invaded Tibet, reaching as far as Damxung. The Central Tibetan monasteries submitted to the Mongols, and the Mongol princes divided them as their appanages.

=== Conflicts with the Delhi Sultanate ===
In 1252–1253, Sali Noyan of the Tatar clan was sent to the Indian borderlands at the head of fresh troops and was given authority over the Qara'unas. Sali himself was subordinate to Möngke's brother Hulagu. Due to the internal conflicts of the Delhi Sultanate, the Mamluk Sultan Nasiruddin Mahmud's brother, Jalal al-Din Masud, fled into Mongol territory in 1248. When Möngke was crowned as Khagan, Jalal al-Din Masud attended the ceremony and asked help from Möngke, who ordered Sali to assist him to recover his ancestral realm. Sali made successive attacks on Multan and Lahore. Sham al-Din Muhammad Kart, the client malik of Herat, accompanied the Mongols. Jalal al-Din was installed as client ruler of Lahore, Kujah, and Sodra. In 1254 the Delhi official Kushlu Khan offered his submission to Möngke and accepted a Mongol darughachi. When he failed to take Delhi, Kushlu turned to Hulagu. In the winter of 1257–1258, Sali Noyan entered Sind in strength and dismantled the fortifications of Multan; his forces may also have invested the island fortress of Bakhkar on the Indus.

=== Conquest of the Middle East ===
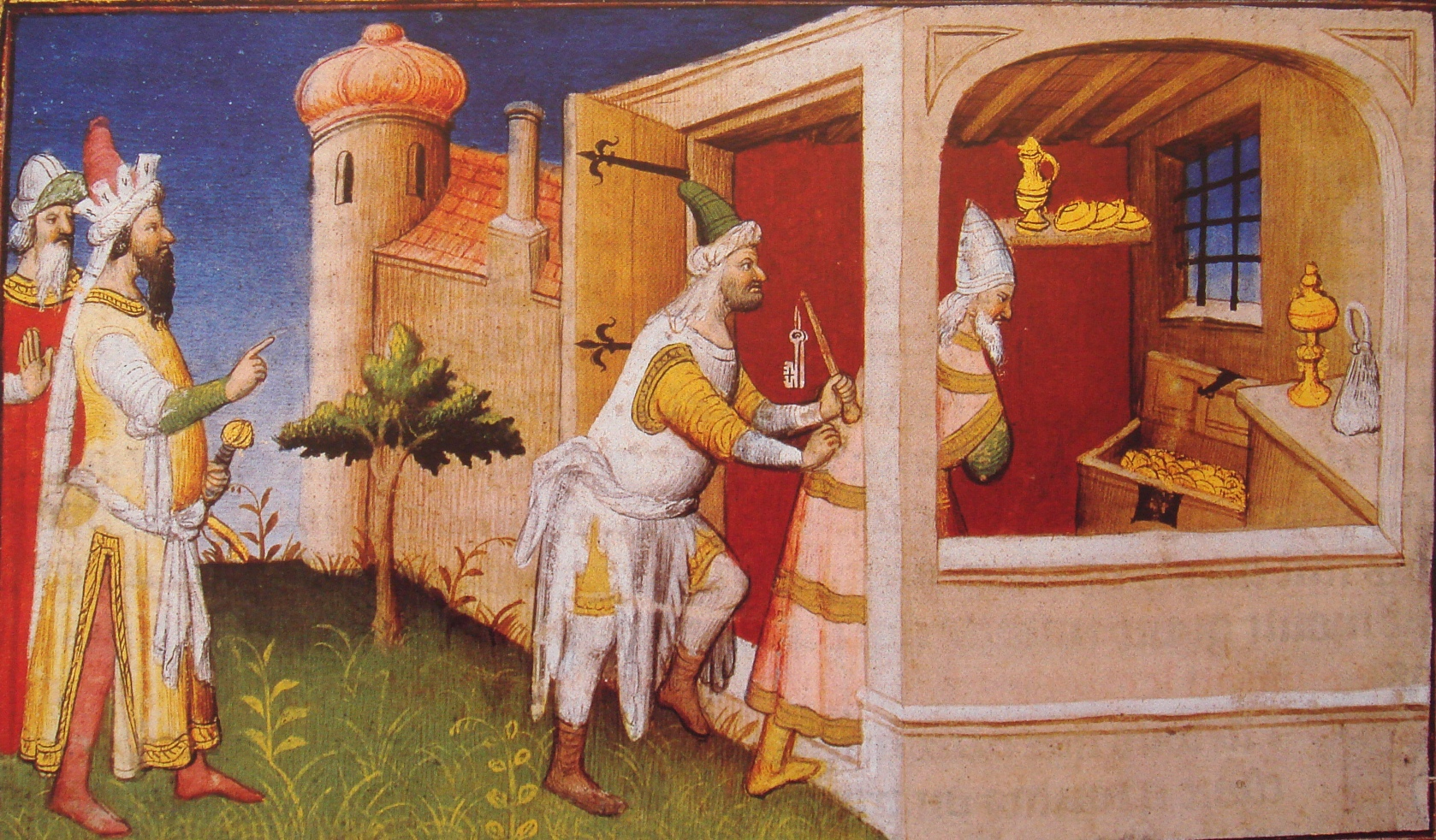
Hulagu imprisons the Caliph Al-Musta'sim among his treasures to starve him to death ("Le livre des merveilles", 15th century).

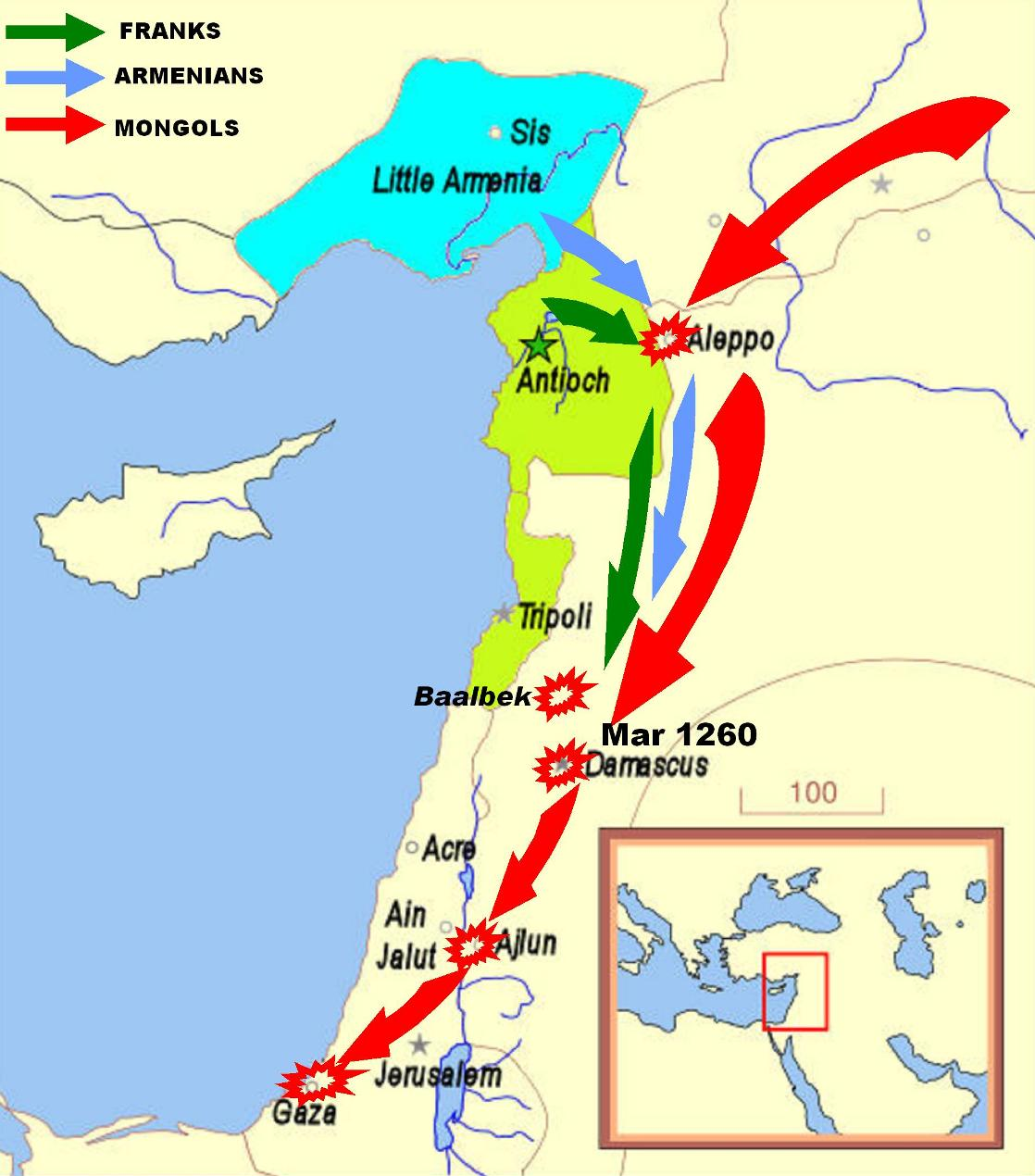
Mongols sacked Syrian cities in 1259–1260 and advanced to the Egyptian border.

When Möngke called a kurultai to prepare the next conquest in 1252–1253, the Sultanate of Rum and the Lu'lu'id dynasty of Mosul were subject to the Mongol Empire. The Ayyubid ruler of Mayyafariqin, Malik Kamil, and his cousin in Aleppo and future Sultan, Malik Nasir Yusuf, sent envoys to Möngke Khan, who imposed darughachis (overseers) and a census on the Diyarbakır area.

Möngke followed the schemes of his predecessor against the Nizari Ismailis (Assassins). Möngke's decision to launch a campaign against Nizari castles followed anti-Nizari urges by Sunnis in the Mongol court, new anti-Nizari complaints (including Shams-ud-Din, the chief judge of Qazvin), and warnings from local Mongol commanders in Persia. In 1252, Möngke entrusted the mission of conquering the rest of Western Asia to his brother Hülegü, with the highest priority being the conquest of the Nizari state and the Abbasid Caliphate. In 1253, William of Rubruck went on a mission to Karakorum in Mongolia, was struck by the security precautions there, reportedly in response to the more than forty assassins who had been sent by Imam Ala al-Din Muhammad there to assassinate Möngke; it is possible that the assassination attempt was merely rumored.

Möngke ordered the Jochid and Chagataid families to join Hulagu's expedition to Iran and strengthened the army with 1,000 siege engineers from China. Möngke's armies, led by his brother Hulagu, launched an attack on the Ismailis in Iran, crushing the last major resistance there by the end of 1256. The Hashashin Imam Rukn ad-Din requested permission to travel to Karakorum to meet with the Great Khan Möngke himself. Hulagu sent him on the long journey to Mongolia, but once the Imam arrived there, Möngke criticized his action and dismissed him. Rukn ad-Din was killed in uncertain circumstances.

For the Abbasids, envoys from Baghdad attended the coronation of Möngke in 1251 to come to terms with the Mongols. However, Möngke told Hulagu that if the caliph Al-Musta'sim refused to meet him in person, then Hulagu was to destroy Baghdad. Hulagu then advanced on Iraq, taking the capital at Baghdad in 1258. Hulagu sent Möngke some of his war booty with the news of his conquest of Baghdad. Möngke dispatched a Chinese messenger to congratulate him for his victory. Outraged by the attack on the caliphate, Malik Kamil revolted, killing his Mongol overseer. Hulagu's son Yoshumut invested Mayyafariqin and executed Malik Kamil. From there they moved into Syria in 1259, took Damascus and Aleppo, and reached the shores of the Mediterranean. Fearing the Mongol advance, the Ayyubid Sultan Malik Nasir Yusuf refused to see Hulagu and fled. However, the Mongols captured him at Gaza.

=== South China ===
In 1241, Töregene Khatun had sent an envoy to make peace proposals and discuss with Zhao Yun (posthumously known as Emperor Lizong). The Song court arrested the envoy and imprisoned him in a fortress with his suite of seventy persons. The envoy died, but his suite were detained until 1254. That year the Mongol army attacked to take Hejiu but failed. The Chinese freed the suite of the late envoy to show their desire for peace. Möngke concentrated all his attention on the conquest of the Song dynasty. Taking personal command late in the decade, he captured many of the fortified cities along the northern front.

In 1252, Möngke commissioned Kublai and experienced general Uriyangkhadai to conquer the Dali Kingdom. From the summer of 1253 to early 1254, the campaigns were successful in conquering and pacifying the tribes, with Uriyangkhadai's military experience proving invaluable in battle. After Kublai's return to northern China, Uriyangkhadai conquered neighboring tribes in Tibet before turning east towards Đại Việt by 1257.

In October 1257, Möngke set out for South China, leaving his administration to his brother, Ariq Böke, in Karakorum with Alamdar as assistant, and fixed his camps near the Liu-pan mountains in May of the following year. He first attacked Song positions in Sichuan and took Paoning (modern-day Langzhong) in 1258. Möngke forbade his army to plunder civilians. When his son accidentally destroyed a crop in the field of the Chinese peasants, Möngke punished him.

On 18 February 1259, Tsagaan Sar, the Mongol New Year feast was given by Möngke near the mountain Zhonggui. At this feast his relative, Togan, a chief of the Jalairs, declared that South China was dangerous because of its climate, and that the Great Khagan should go northward for safety. Baritchi of the Erlat tribe called this advice cowardly and advised Möngke to remain with his army. These words pleased Möngke who wished to take the city nearby. The Song commander slew his envoy who had been sent to ask the city's submission.

In 1259, Uriyangkhadai's forces attacked Guangxi as part of a coordinated Mongol attack in 1259 with armies attacking in Sichuan under Möngke and other Mongol armies attacking in modern-day Shandong and Henan.

== Wives, concubines, and children ==
Wives:

- Qutuqtai Khatun (according to Guillaume de Rubrouck and Rasid ad-Din, the chief wife; was still alive in 1259), of the Ikires branch of the Khongirad, daughter of Uladai Küregen.
  - Baltu (班禿), 1st son.
  - Ürüng-Tash (玉龍答失), 3rd son.
    - Sarban (撒里蠻).
    - Öljei (完澤), Prince of Wei (衞王).
  - Bayalun, Grand Princess of Chang (伯雅倫 昌國大長公主).
    - Married Qurin Küregen (忽鄰).
  - An unnamed son who died in infancy.
- Qutai khatun (died in 1254; posthumously Empress Zhenjie 貞節皇后), of the Bosqur clan of the Khongirad, daughter of Manggechen(Alchi noyan's nephew).
- Yesü'er Khatun (也速兒皇后), Qutai's younger sister.
- Oghul-Qaimish Khatun (also Oghul Tutmish; not to be confused with Oghul Qaimish, the Merkit wife of Güyük Khan), of the Oirat, daughter of Qutuqa Beki.
  - Shirin, elder daughter.
    - Married Chochimtai Küregen, son of Taiju Küregen of the Olkhunut.
  - Bichqa (also Kö'ünen), younger daughter.
    - Married Chochimtai Küregen after Shirin's death.
- Chübei Khatun (出卑皇后; d. 1259).
- Mingli Qutluq Khatun (明里忽都魯皇后).
- Qoricha Khatun (火里差皇后), of the Qorulas.

Concubines:

- Baya'ujin, of the Baya'ut.
  - Shiregi (昔里吉), Prince of Heping (河平王), 4th son.
    - Ulus-Buqa (兀魯思不花).
    - Huanghuo Temür (晃火帖木兒), Prince of Bing (并王).
- Küiteni, of the Eljigin clan.
  - Asutai (阿速歹), 2nd son.
    - Öljei.
    - Hulachu.
    - Hantum.
    - Öljei-Buqa.

Other child, mother unrecorded:

- Biandu (辯都), 5th son; died young without issue.

== Death ==
There is no consensus concerning Möngke Khan's death. His last recorded appearances were at the Siege of Diaoyucheng near modern-day Chongqing; where it is also generally agreed he died. After his death, the Mongol armies were forced to withdraw from action. Chinese sources record Möngke as having been killed in battle during an assault on the fortress: a contemporary Song poem describes the "victory in Sichuan" where Möngke was killed by a crossbow arrow, which is corroborated in the writing of the Syriac monk Bar Hebraeus. The account in the History of Yuan, which was written during the Ming dynasty, relates that Möngke was fatally wounded instead by a stone projectile from either a cannon or trebuchet.

Persian accounts largely originating from Rashid al-Din claim that Möngke died of dysentery or cholera near the site of the siege on 11 August 1259 — the History of Yuan does not directly corroborate this, but it mentions a fatal disease outbreak in the Mongol camp during the campaign. In line with the lack of clarity in Mongol historiography concerning the deaths of khans, it has been speculated that the Mongols possibly covered up the story by claiming that his death was due to illness, leading to the story in Persian accounts.

Other accounts include those of the Armenian historian Hayton of Corycus's claims that Möngke was on a Mongol war ship that sank in the Chinese seas while the Mongols were besieging an island fortress. Hayton's work is noted for including errors and amalgamating distinct events, so the account of Möngke's death could be a confused reference to the later Mongol invasions of Japan.

A month after Möngke's death, his youngest wife Chubei died at the Liupanshan Mountains. Möngke's son Asutai conducted the corpse to Burkhan Khaldun, Mongolia, where the late Khagan was buried near the graves of Genghis and Tolui.

Möngke's death in 1259 led to the four-year Toluid Civil War between his two younger brothers, Kublai Khan and Ariq Böke. Though Kublai Khan eventually won, the succession war and the subsequent Kaidu–Kublai war essentially resulted in the permanent division of the Mongol Empire. It was not until 1304, when all Mongol khans submitted to Kublai's successor, Temür Khan, that the Mongol world again acknowledged a single paramount sovereign, although the authority of the late Khagans rested on nothing like the same foundations as that of Genghis Khan and his first three successors.

When Kublai Khan established the Yuan dynasty in China in 1271, Möngke Khan was placed on the official record of the dynasty as Xianzong (simplified Chinese: 宪宗; traditional Chinese: 憲宗; pinyin: Xiànzōng).

== Foreign influence in Karakorum ==
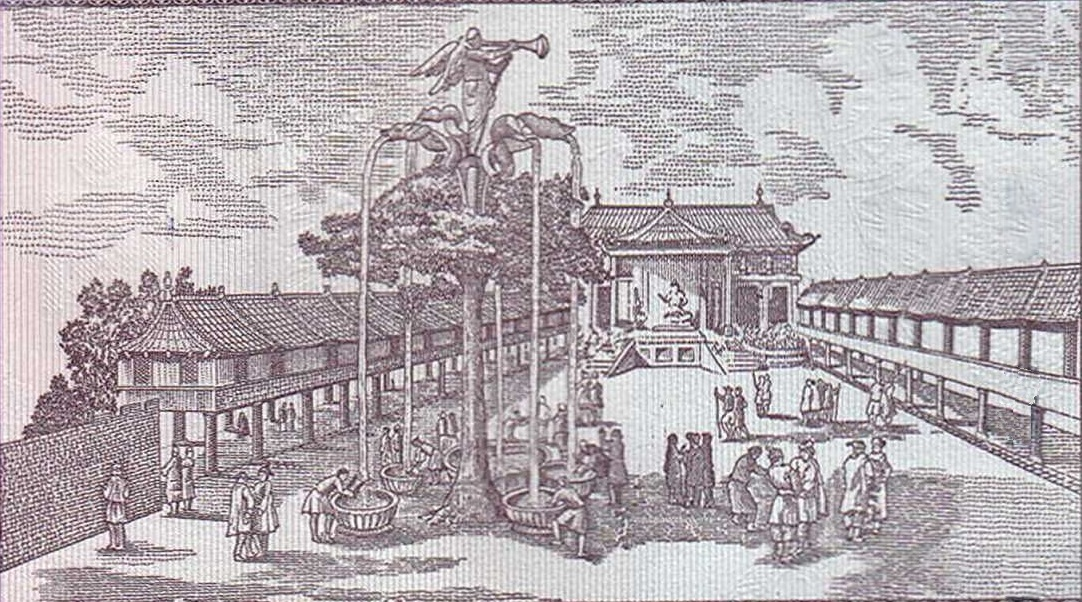
Silver tree fountain in front of Tumen Amugulang Palace, 18th-century European imagination

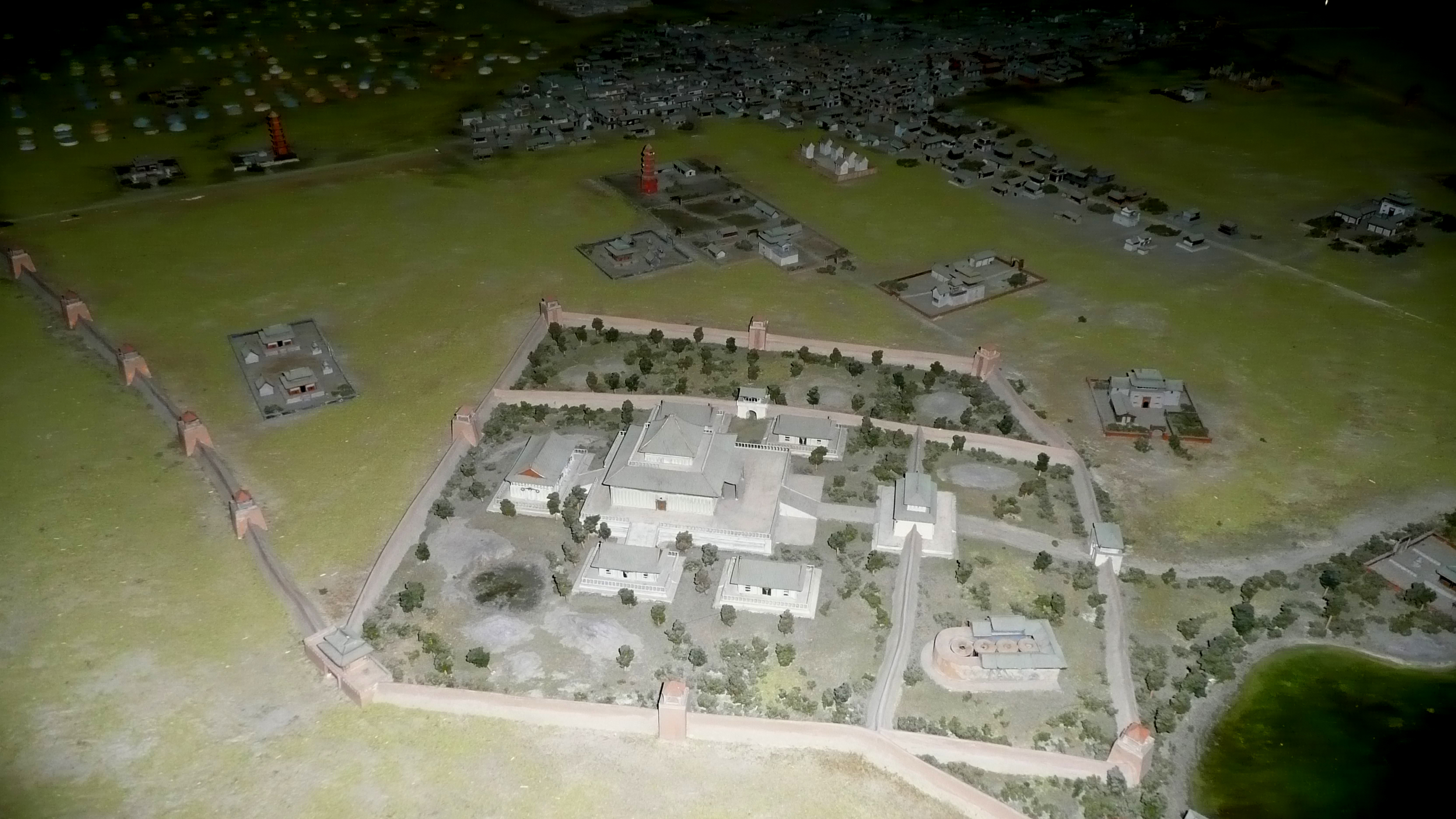
The model of the Khan Palace in Karakorum in the National History Museum of Mongolia in Ulaan-Baatar

In 1252–1253, Flemish missionary and explorer William of Rubruck traveled all the way to the capital city of Karakorum and saw Hungarians, Russians, Germans, and even a Parisian goldsmith named Guillaume Boucher. He even heard of Saxon miners in Dzungaria and other foreigners such as a woman from the Duchy of Lorraine who mastered yurt-making.

Additionally, William of Rubruk observed a large enough Christian population in Karakorum to have its own church and parish. As most of the Christians there, were Uyghurs they belonged to the Church of the East and used Syriac language for their texts. Rubruk was particularly critical of them, comparing them with the Nestorian heresy as many of their rites and traditions greatly differed from that of the Catholic Church. He also had a problem of properly communicating with the local priests as they were Uyghurs, and he had no common language with them.

In 1253, Möngke deported households from China proper to repair and maintain the imperial ordas. He decorated the capital city of Karakorum with Chinese, European, and Persian architectures. One example of the construction was a large silver tree, with pipes that discharge various drinks and a triumphant angel at its top, made by the Guillaume Boucher. Foreign merchants' quarters, Buddhist monasteries, mosques, and churches were newly built. Markets were in the Muslim sector and outside the four gates. Ethnic Han Chinese farmers grew vegetables and grains outside the wall of Karakorum.

== Notes ==
Möngke Khan House of Borjigin (1206–1634) Born: 1209 Died: 1259
Regnal titles
Preceded by Oghul Qaimish (regent)	Khagan-Emperor of the Mongol Empire; 1251–1259	Succeeded by Kublai Khan; Ariq Böke
