= Şükrü Okan =

Turkish politician

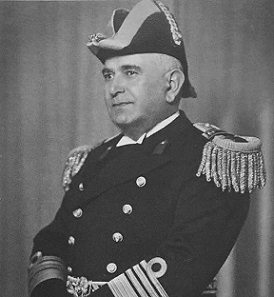

Personal details
- Born: 1880 Tirebolu, Ottoman Empire
- Died: 1957 (aged 76–77)

Şükrü Okan (1880–1957) was a Turkish admiral and politician. He was a devoted supporter of Atatürk and his reforms.
