= Altyn (helmet) =

Soviet titanium combat helmet

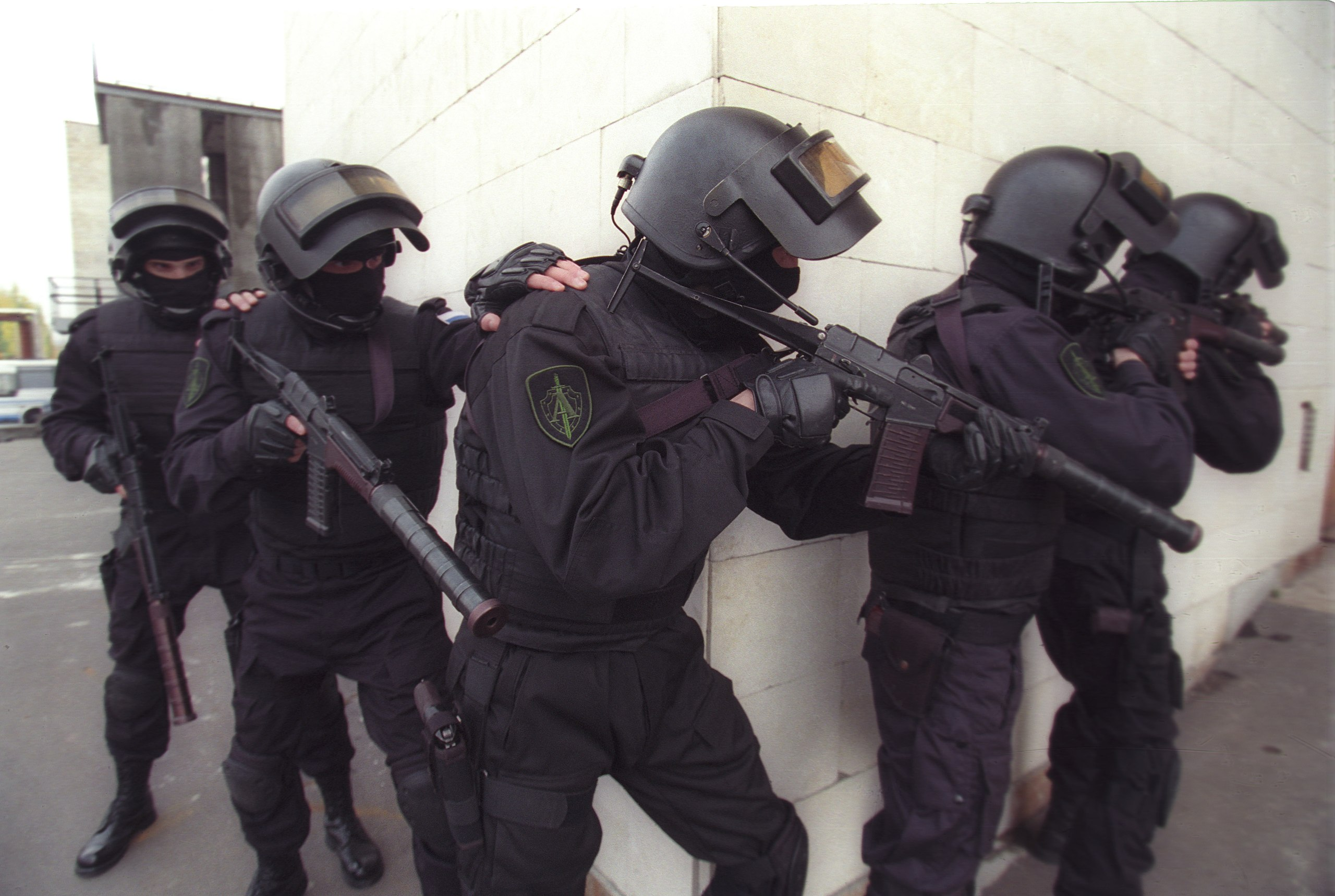
- FSB personnel during a training exercise wearing the Altyn-R2M helmet
- Type: Combat helmet
- Place of origin: Soviet Union

Service history
- In service: 1991-present
- Used by: See Users
- Wars: First Chechen War; Second Chechen War

Production history
- Designer: NII Stali
- Produced: 1991-2009

Specifications
- Weight: 3.5-4 kg

The Altyn (Russian: Алтын; named after ''Altyn'') is a titanium helmet developed in the Soviet Union and adopted by the KGB. Providing great protection to the wearer and equipped with an armored visor, it became popular with Russian Internal affairs and security services Spetsnaz units. These helmets are made by NII Stali.

== History ==
Altyn was developed on the basis of the PSH-77 helmet created by TIG company from Switzerland. The Soviet Union purchased PSH-77 helmets for use by Alpha Group Spetsnaz, who used them during Operation Storm-333 in the Soviet–Afghan War. These helmets became very popular among KGB servicemen, and as such, a decision was made to produce an indigenous version. In 1991, NII Stali produced the titanium shells, aramid liners and titanium visors, while the armored glass was bought from abroad, and all of this was assembled together by KGB. This early variant was called Altyn-R1 (Алтын-Р1). Helmet was rated at class 2 protection for the shell and class 1 protection for the visor. However, early helmets faced difficulty when shot at with 7.62x25 PST GZH steel core rounds from a TT pistol from 8 meters.

By 1997, the Altyn-R2M (Алтын-Р2М) was developed and had a number of improvements. Apart from alterations to the radio system, a major innovation was the production of domestically made armored glass as well as thicker and better-quality shells, reaching 4 mm of thickness. As such, it could stop PST GZH steel core rounds from TT from 5 meters. Old PSH-77 were also modified with radio sets and new glass.

The helmet was first used in the 1993 Constitutional Crisis and in the two Chechen Wars. They also became widely known after Beslan school siege, during which the majority of Alpha and Vympel operatives wore Altyn helmets.

In the late 2000s, the Altyn was being replaced by newer helmets from the LSHZ series as well as the Rys-T. Production stopped in 2009 with the last batch produced for Cuban special forces.

NII Stali also produced the K6-3 helmet, which is a copy of Altyn, the main difference being the absence of a radio headset. Since Altyn was produced for the KGB, NII Stali did not have the rights to produce Altyn for sale, and therefore they created a commercial version called K6-3.

== Variants ==
- Altyn-R2M: Improved version of the Altyn, produced in 1997 with better ballistic protection.
- K6-3: A copy of Altyn made without a radio headset. Since Altyn was produced for the then KGB, NII Stali did not have the rights to produce Altyn for sale.

== Users ==
=== Current ===
- Cuba: Reported to be used by Cuban special forces.
- Russia: Used by the FSB. Both Altyn and K6-3 helmets used by OMON units.

=== Former ===
- USSR: Used by the KGB.
