= Altan Jalab =

Altan Jalab Atin Jilaō
- Location in Afghanistan
- Coordinates: 37°04′N 70°09′E
- Country: Afghanistan
- Province: Badakhshan Province
- District: Argo

Altan Jalab is a village in Afghanistan. At the turn of the 20th century, it was the end of the 30th stage on the Jalalabad-Faizabad-Rustak road, about halfway between Faizabad and Rustak. The area is also said to have been the location of extensive ruins of the town and fort of Kala-i-Zafar. More recently, Altan Jalab has been reported as the name of a small town about 27 miles southwest of Faizabad, with a stream in the vicinity.
