= Toqto'a =

Toqto’a may refer to:

- Toqta (died c. 1312), Khan of the Golden Horde
- Toqto'a (Yuan dynasty) (1314－1356), the grand councillor of the Yuan Dynasty
