= Behsud =

Behsud or Bihsud may refer to:

== People ==
- Behsud (Hazara tribe), a tribe of Hazara people

== Places ==
- Bihsud District, in Nangarhar Province, Afghanistan
- Markazi Bihsud District, in Maidan Wardak Province, Afghanistan
  - Behsud, the capital of Markazi Bihsud District
- Hesa Awal Behsood District, in Maidan Wardak Province, Afghanistan
