= Salih Altın =

German footballer

Personal information
- Full name: Salih Altın
- Date of birth: July 17, 1987 (age 39)
- Place of birth: Mulheim an der Ruhr, West Germany
- Height: 1.78 m (5 ft 10 in)
- Position: Attacking midfielder

Team information
- Current team: Duisburger FV 08

Youth career
- 1994–2001: Rot-Weiß Oberhausen
- 2001–2003: SG Wattenscheid 09
- 2003–2006: FC Schalke 04

Senior career*
Years	Team	Apps	(Gls)
2006–2008	Wuppertaler SV II	29	(0)
2008–2010	→ VfB Lübeck (loan)	17	(0)
2008–2010	Wuppertaler SV	31	(1)
2011–2012	VfB Speldorf	47	(10)
2012	VfB Lübeck	4	(1)
2013–2017	FSV Duisburg	81	(3)
2017–2020	SV Genc Osman	70	(3)
2020–	Duisburger FV 08	0	(0)

International career
2003–2004	Germany U-18	7	(0)
2004	Germany U-19	2	(0)
- * Club domestic league appearances and goals as of 23:25, 13 May 2020 (UTC)

Salih Altın (born 17 July 1987 in Mulheim an der Ruhr) is a German football player, who is currently playing for Duisburger FV 08.

== Career ==
Altın played in youth for Rot-Weiß Oberhausen, SG Wattenscheid 09 and FC Schalke 04. In 2006 he moved to the reserve team of Wuppertaler SV. After he had only played one game for Wuppertaler SV by December 2007, he was loaned to VfB Lübeck for six months. For the 2008/09 season he returned to Wuppertaler SV, where he made his first professional appearance on August 30, 2008 when he came on as a substitute in a game against 1. FC Union Berlin. After Wuppertaler SV didn't manage to stay in the 3. Liga in the 2009/10 season, Altın left the club.

After the end of his contract in Wuppertaler, Altin was about to join TFF First League club Eskişehirspor. However, after he had already started training in Turkey, the change finally burst and Altin became without a club. He kept himself fit with the association of contract footballers and the second team of Fortuna Düsseldorf. From January 2011, Altin played for VfB Speldorf. In the summer 2012, Altin moved to VfB Lübeck in the Regionalliga Nord. After half a year the contract was terminated because the club had filed for bankruptcy.

In 2013 Altin played for FSV Duisburg until the end of 2016. On 1 July 2017, he joined SV Genc Osman Duisburg. On 4 May 2020 it was confirmed, that he would play for Duisburger FV 08 from the 2020/21 season.
