= Sorghaghtani Beki =

Leading stateswoman in the Mongol Empire

Sorghaghtani
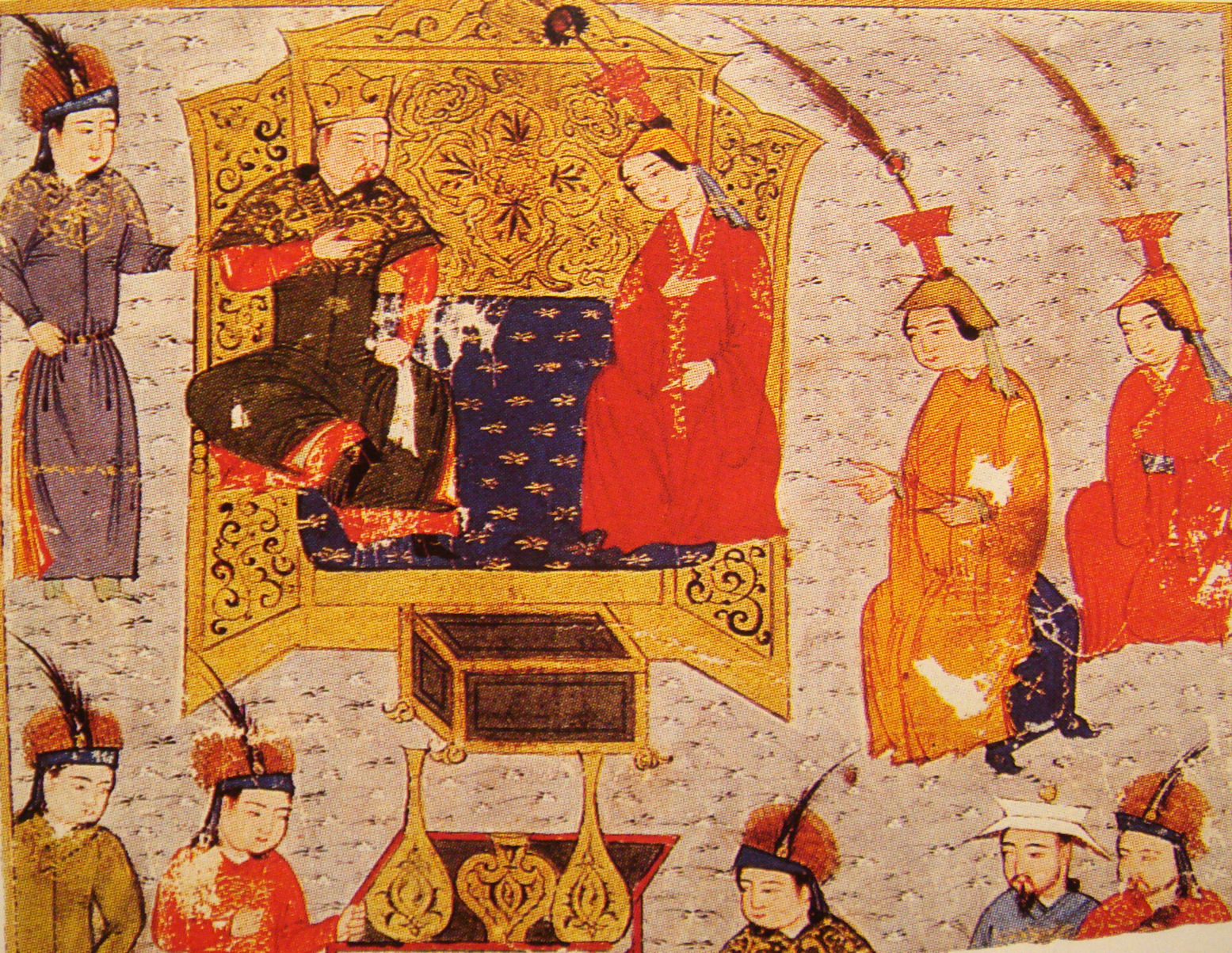
- Queen Sorghaghtani with her husband, Tolui. Rashid al-Din Hamadani, early 14th century.
- Born: c. 1199; Mongolian–Manchurian grassland
- Died: 1 March 1252 (aged around 53); Mongol Empire
- Burial: Gansu (at church)
- Spouse: Tolui
- Issue: Möngke Khan; Kublai Khan; Hulagu Khan; Ariq Böke
- House: Keraite
- Father: Jakha Gambhu, brother of Toghril
- Mother: Wasai
- Religion: Church of the East

Surqaghtani Beki (Note: Mongolian: Сорхагтани Бэхи, romanized: Sorkhagtani Bekhi, pronounced [sɔr̥χə̆χtʰənɪ̆ pexɪ̆]; Classical Mongolian: ᠰᠤᠷᠬᠠᠭᠲᠠᠨᠢ ᠪᠡᠬᠢ [ˈsurqʰaɣtʰanĭ b̥ekʰĭ]; Chinese: 唆魯禾帖尼; pinyin: Suōlǔhétiēní) (or simply Bekhi; c. 1199 – 1 March 1252 ), posthumously Empress Xianyi Zhuangsheng, (Note: Chinese: 顯懿莊聖皇后; pinyin: Xiǎnyì Zhuāngshèng Huánghòu) was a Keraite princess and daughter-in-law of Genghis Khan. Married to Tolui, Genghis' youngest son, Sorghaghtani became one of the most powerful and competent people in the Mongol Empire. She made policy decisions at a pivotal moment that led to the transition of the Mongol Empire towards a more cosmopolitan and sophisticated style of administration. She raised her sons to be leaders and maneuvered the family politics so that all four of her sons, Möngke Khan, Hulagu Khan, Ariq Böke, and Kublai Khan, went on to inherit the legacy of their grandfather.

Given her considerable influence at a critical juncture in the history of the Mongol Empire, Sorghaghtani Beki is widely regarded as one of the most influential and powerful women of the medieval era. Sorghaghtani was a Christian and a member of the Church of the East, a denomination often, though imprecisely, referred to in Western scholarship as “Nestorianism”. As a leading political figure within the imperial establishment, she played a significant role in shaping policies that facilitated the expansion of trade networks and the promotion of intellectual and cultural exchange across Mongol territories, which together formed the largest contiguous land empire in world history.

== Life ==
Sorghaghtani was the daughter of Jakha Gambhu, the younger brother of the powerful Keraite leader Toghrul, also known as Ong Khan. According to the Secret History of the Mongols, around 1203, when Toghrul was a more powerful leader than Temüjin, Temüjin proposed to Toghrul that Temüjin's eldest son Jochi might marry Toghrul's daughter or granddaughter, thus binding the two groups. Toghrul refused this alliance and later attempted to kill the increasingly powerful Temüjin through an invitation to discuss this proposal. Temüjin discovered this plan and they escaped at the last moment. Eventually, the Keraites were routed in the ensuing war and Toghrul was killed, possibly by the Naimans.

Unlike his brother, Jakha usually supported Temüjin and gave his two daughters to him and one more daughter to Genghis Khan's oldest son Jochi. Genghis married the elder of the daughters, Ibaqa Beki (later handed over to the general Jürchedei), and gave young Sorghaghtani, who was still a teenager, to his son Tolui. Sorghaghtani's father Jakha was killed by Jürchedei when the Keraites revolted against Genghis Khan after 1204.

Like most Mongol women of the time, Sorghaghtani wielded great authority at home. Mongol women had far more rights than in many other cultures at the time, especially since the men were often away and they were the ones responsible for the home. Although she herself was illiterate, she recognized the value of literacy in running such a far-flung empire. Each of her sons learned a different language for different regions. Sorghaghtani, a Christian, respected other religions. Her sons, like Genghis, were all very tolerant in matters of religion, and the Mongol Empire promulgated the notion of state above religion while supporting all major religions of the time. Sorghaghtani also financed the construction of a madrasa in Bukhara and gave alms to both Christians and Muslims.

Sorghaghtani's husband Tolui, whose appanages included eastern Mongolia, parts of Iran and northern China, died at the age of 41 in 1232. Ögedei Khan, Genghis's third son who had succeeded his father, gave her enduring authority to handle Tolui's estates. The Secret History suggests that Ögedei may have consulted Sorghaghtani on various matters, and he always held her in high regard. Ögedei appointed her in charge of the Empire's administration, which meant she played a pivotal role in securing the lands won under Genghis Khan.

Ögedei sought to link her realm to his and proposed marriage, which she declined; he then proposed that she marry his son Güyük (Mongol widows often married again within the family), but she refused, claiming that her four sons needed her attention. This decision later turned out to be one of the most important ones in the formation of the Mongol Empire, as all four of Sorghaghtani's sons (grandsons of Genghis) became important leaders in their own right.

When Sorghaghtani asked for part of Hebei as her appanage in 1236 after the end of the Mongol conquest of the Jin dynasty, Ögedei hesitated, but not for long. She shunned him into compliance by pointing out that the place was hers by right anyway because her husband had conquered it. However, Ögedei also expanded his appanage, seizing some territories of Tolui and taking most of Sorghaghtani's soldiers.

After Ögedei Khan died in 1241, his wife Töregene Khatun ruled as regent until 1246, when she managed to get her son Güyük elected as Khagan at a large kurultai. However, he immediately set out to undermine his mother's power as well as that of Sorghaghtani, Alaqai Beki (the Ongud ruler and daughter of Genghis Khan) and Ebuskun (the wife of Chagatai Khan, regent for the Central Asian Empire).

Meanwhile, the ambitious Sorghaghtani had secretly teamed up with Güyük's cousin Batu Khan, the senior male in the Borjigin and ruler of the Golden Horde (north of the Caspian Sea to Bulgaria). In 1248, when Güyük was setting out on a campaign to the Middle East (ostensibly for conquest, but possibly to defeat Batu Khan), he died under somewhat suspicious circumstances; some have speculated that Sorghaghtani may have taken "direct action against Güyük".

After Güyük's death, Sorghaghtani sent her eldest son Möngke to Batu Khan. Batu and Sorghaghtani championed the name of Möngke, who had fought along with Batu in the European campaign, as Khagan. Möngke was named Great Khan at a kurultai organized by Batu in Siberia sometime before 1250, but this was contested as not being properly in Mongolia. However, the ancient Mongol homeland where Genghis was born was in her regency, so she organized a kurultai here which was attended by Batu's brother Berke. Möngke was formally named the Great Khan. The Ögedei and Güyük families attempted to overthrow him but failed. Möngke arrested and drowned Güyük's widow Oghul Qaimish, and many other members of Ögedei's family.

Sorghaghtani fell ill and died in February or March 1252 around Tsagaan Sar, the Lunar New Year festival in the Mongolian calendar, a few months after Möngke's accession ceremony. She was buried in a Christian church in Gansu.

== Children ==
Sorghaghtani bore Tolui at least four children. They included:

- Möngke Khan: Great Khan (1251–1259) of the Mongol Empire.
- Kublai Khan: Great Khan (1260–1294) of the Mongol Empire and the Yuan dynasty
- Hulegu Khan: khan (1256–1264) of the Ilkhanate dynasty that ruled Persia, Turkey, Georgia and Armenia.
- Ariq Böke, her fourth son, was also declared Great Khan (rivalling Kublai) for a short period in 1260; he fought Kublai in the Toluid Civil War and would eventually be captured by Kublai in 1264.

== Legacy ==
In 1310, she was regarded as "Empress" in a ceremony that included a mass. Sorghaghtani was enshrined in a Christian church in Ganzhou in 1335, and sacrifices were ordered to be offered here. By 1480 a cult had been conducted for her memory at the orda that was kept by the Chahars. This ordo moved to Ordos City (in modern Inner Mongolia) in the 17th century.

She is spoken of very highly both in the Secret History, as well as by Muslim, Chinese and Christian historians.

If I were to see among the race of women another woman like this, I should say that the race of women was far superior to that of men.

— Syriac scholar Bar Hebraeus (1226–1286)

Among the Mongols this lady is the most renowned, with the exception of the emperor Güyük's mother Töregene.

— Papal envoy Giovanni da Pian del Carpine(c. 1180–1252)

Extremely intelligent and able...the most intelligent woman in the world. There is no doubt that it was through her intelligence and ability that she raised the station of her sons above that of their cousins and caused them to attain to the rank of qa'ans and emperors.

— Persian historian and Ilkhanid Grand Vizier Rashid-al-Din Hamadani

The bringing of the Khanate to the house of Tolui Khan and the placing of the right in its due place were due to the competence and shrewdness of Sorqoqtani Beki and the help and assistance of Batu, because of their friendship for one another...Sorqoqtani

Beki, and his sons after his [Tolui's] death until the time when they became qa'ans and rulers through the efforts and endeavors of their mother and

as the result of her ability and intelligence.

— Rashid-al-Din Hamadani

Now in the management and education of all her sons, in the administration of affairs of state, in the maintenance of dignity and prestige and in the execution of business, [Sorghaghtani] Beki, by the nicety of her judgment and discrimination, constructed such a basis and for the strengthening of these edifices laid such a foundation that no turban-wearer would have been capable of the like or could have dealt with these matters with the like brilliance. In any business which [Ogedei] Qa'an undertook, whether with regard to the weal of the Empire or the disposal of the army, he used first to consult and confer with her and would suffer no change or alteration of whatever she recommended... For the report of her wisdom and prudence and the fame of her counsel and sagacity had spread to all parts, and none would gainsay her word. Furthermore, in the management of her household and in the ceremonial of her court she laid for kinsmen and stranger such a foundation as the khans of the world had not been capable of."

— Persian Historian Ata-Malik Juvayni

=== Prester John ===
Sorghaghtani was the niece of the powerful Keraite leader of the Mongols, Ong Khan (often known simply as Toghrul). To Europeans, Toghrul was one of the distant Eastern rulers who was sometimes associated with the legend of "Prester John". During Mongol-European diplomacy, the Mongols sometimes played upon this perception by the Europeans, describing Mongol princesses such as Sorghaghtani and Doquz Khatun as being "daughters of Prester John".

== In popular culture ==
A fictionalized version of Sorghaghtani Beki features in the 2021 manga series A Witch's Life in Mongol, which was adapted into an anime in 2026.
