= Batumöngke =

The name Batumöngke refers to more than one person:

- Dayan Khan, a powerful Mongol khan who united the Mongols after the fall of the Mongol Empire. Batumöngke is his given name.
- Jambyn Batmönkh, Mongolian former prime minister
