= Şükrü Altın =

Turkish historical novelist, educator, and painter

- Born: 22 February 1956 (age 70); Ilgaz, Çankırı, Turkey
- Occupation: Novelist
- Writing career
- Period: 1990 – present
- Genre: Novel
- Subjects: Literature, painting
- Notable awards: ÇKG Çankırı -- Writer of the Year award
- Website: www.sukrualtin.com.tr

Şükrü Altın (born 22 February 1956) is a Turkish historical novelist, educator, and painter.

== Childhood ==
He finished primary and secondary schools in Güney village of Ilgaz, high school in Yıldırım Beyazıt High School in Ankara, and graduated from the university in Bartın.

== Education life ==
He served as a teacher and school director in Gümüşhane, Kastamonu, Hatay, Sivas, and Çankırı. He tutored Turkish to his students. In the following years, he served as the District Director of Education in Korgun (Çankırı), Araç and Küre (Kastamonu), and Eflani (Karabük).

== Today ==
He lectured about his works in the country and received rewards from different institutions and organizations. He worked as a reporter and did research-investigation and interview writing. His columns and essays have been published in newspapers. He has been continuing to work as a writer since 2008. He is moderately fluent in Arabic. Şükrü Altın’s articles are published in a newspaper called Çankırı Karatekin.

== Private life ==
He is married with three children.

== Awards ==
- Karabük Governorate – Service Certificate of Honor
- ÇKG Çankırı – Writer of the Year award

== Works ==
Book	Type	ISBN
Fâtiha-ı Şerif (Çocuklar İçin) (Al-Fatiha for the Kids)	Tefsir	ISBN 978-605-62790-0-3
Kur’an-ı Kerim'in Anahtarı / Fâtiha (The Key of the Quran / Al-Fatiha)	Islamic research	ISBN 978 6054-618-10-1
Veysel Karani ve Üveyslik (Uways al‑Qarani and the Uwaysite)	Islamic	ISBN 978-6054-618-15-6
Görmeden Sevmek (Blind Love)	Novel	ISBN 978-6054-618-09-5
Yalnız Adam / Âkif (Lonely Man/Akif)	Biographical fiction	ISBN 978-605-4977-13-0
Teşkilat-ı Mahsusa / Bir Gizli Teşkilatın Öyküsü (The Special Organization (National Intelligence Service)/ The story of a Secret Organization)	Historical fiction	ISBN 978-605-4977-06-2
Nurlu Şehrin Nûru / Hz. Ebû Eyyûb El Ensâri (The Shining of the Radiant City/Hz. Eyup el Ansari)	Islamic novel	ISBN 978-605-4977-11-6
Hilafetin Çığlığı / Kandiller Söndü (The Caliphate’s Cry/Oil-Lamps went out)	Novel	ISBN 978-605-5094-87-4
Sürgündeki Son Halife / Abdülmecid Efendi (Abdülmecid Efendi/The Last Caliph in Exile)	Novel	ISBN 978-605-9844-01-7
II. ABDÜLHAMİD EFSANESİ / Yıldız İstihbarat Teşkilatı	Novel	ISBN 978-605-9844-87-1
AŞKIN ADI YAVUZ / Cariye	Novel	ISBN 978-605-9844-64-2
Şehzade'nin Şehrazat'ı	Novel	ISBN 978-605-9844-86-4
