= Şükrü Halûk Akalın =

Turkish academic and bureaucrat (born 1956)

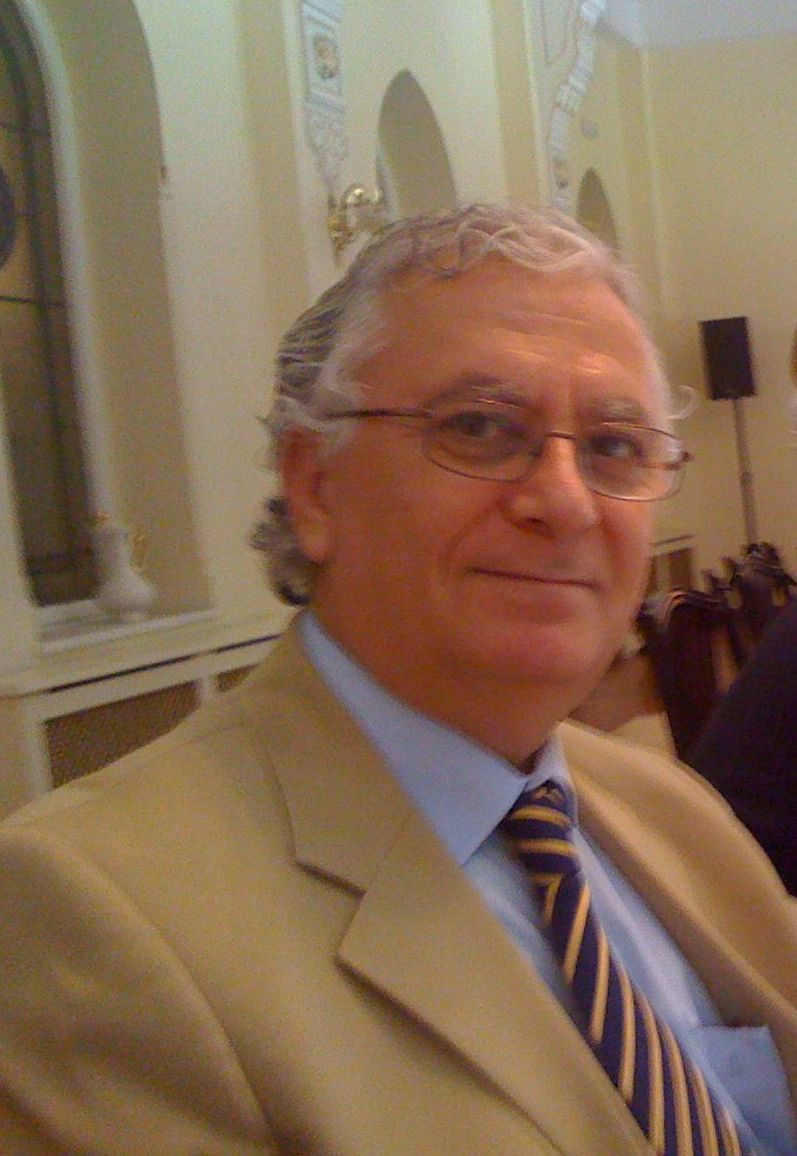
- Born: 22 January 1956 (age 70); Adana, Turkey
- Citizenship: Turkey
- Education: Istanbul University
- Known for: Turkish language studies
- Scientific career
- Fields: Turkish language
- Institutions: Çukurova University; Hacettepe University
- Website: turkoloji.hacettepe.edu.tr/pdf/shakalin.pdf

Şükrü Halûk Akalın (born 22 January 1956) is a retired Turkish academic and bureaucrat who served as head of the Turkish Language Association (TLA) from 2001 to 2012.

== Early life and education ==
Akalın was born in Adana on 22 January 1956. He received a bachelor's degree in Turkish language and literature from Istanbul University in 1979. He holds a PhD in Turkish language, which he obtained from Istanbul University in May 1987.

== Career ==
After graduation, Akalın began his academic career at Çukurova University in Adana in 1989. He was promoted to associate professor in 1990 and to full professor in 1996. In 1995, he became a member of the TLA. Then he was appointed a member of the executive committee of the TLA. On 15 April 2001, he was named as the head of the TLA. His term ended on 12 January 2012. He was a faculty member at Hacettepe University in Ankara. He served as the head of the department of Turkish language and literature at Hacettepe University. Since 2017 he has been a member of the editorial board of the Metafizika, an international journal of philosophy and interdisciplinary studies.

== Publications ==
Akalın published numerous articles on Turkish language in different scientific journals. In addition, he is the author of several books, some of which are given as follows:

- Ebü'l-Hayr-ı Rumi, Saltuk-nâme I (1987), Ministry of Culture and Tourism, Ankara
- Ebü'l-Hayr-ı Rumi, Saltuk-nâme II (1988), Ministry of Culture and Tourism, İstanbul
- Ebü'l-Hayr-ı Rumi, Saltuk-nâme III (1990), Ministry of Culture, Ankara
- Şor Sözlüğü (Dictionary of Shors) (1995), (with N. N. Kurpeşko), Adana
- Anayurttan Atayurda (From motherland to forefatherland) (1995), Adana
- Eski Anadolu Türkçesi (Old Anatolian Turkish) (1995), third edition, Adana
