= List of foreign observers of Russia =

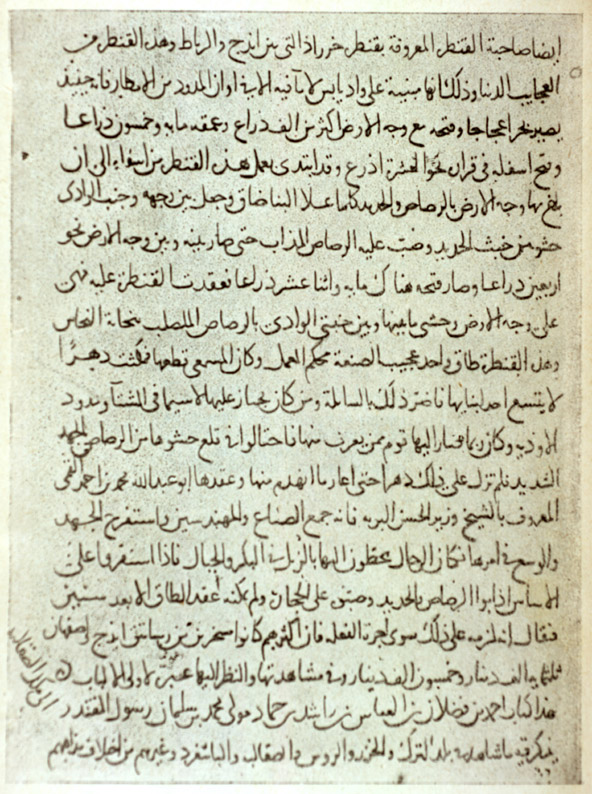
A page from ibn Fadlan's manuscript

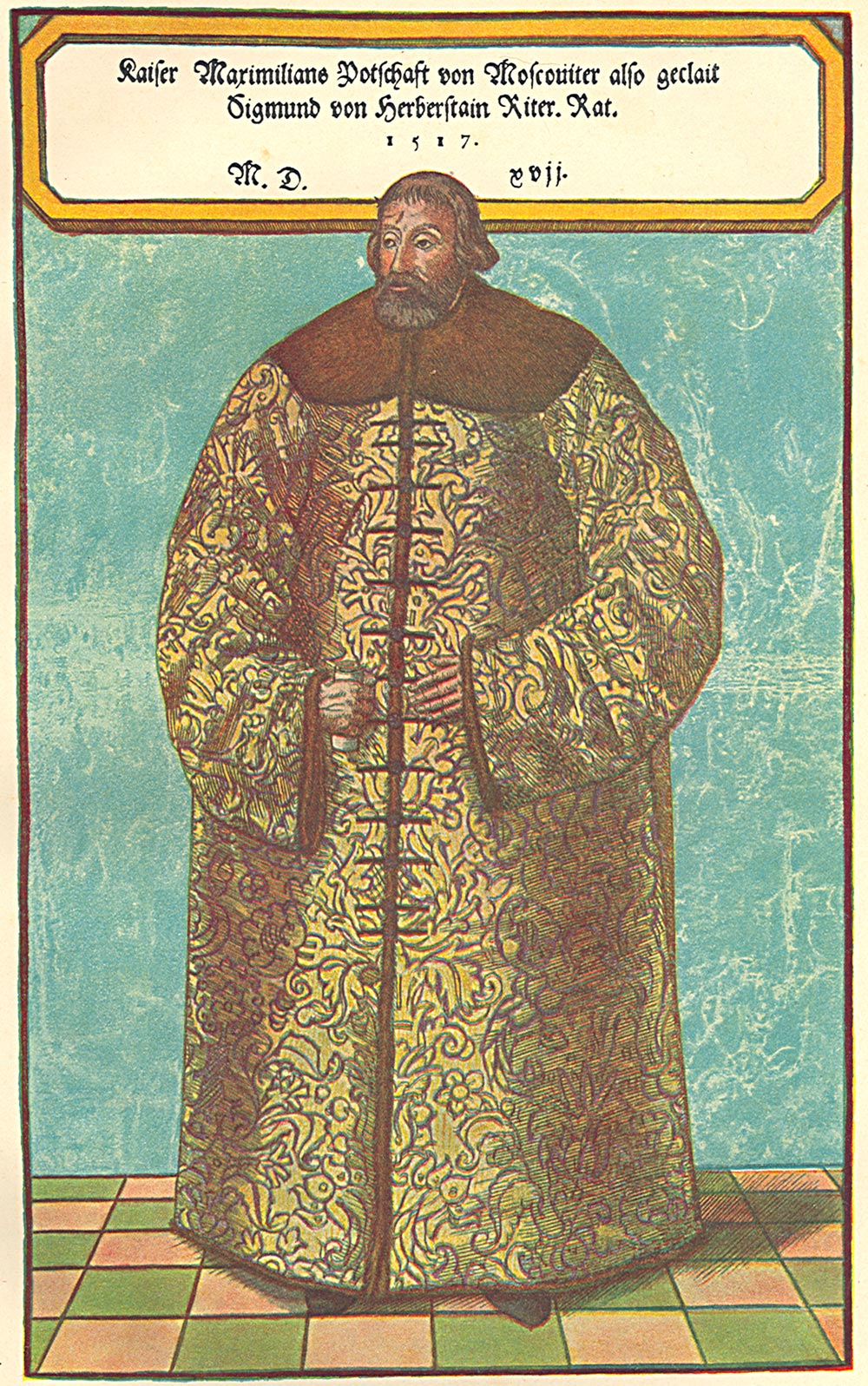
Sigismund von Herberstein in Russian dress

This is a list of foreign observers of Russia, ordered by the date of the first publication or any other appropriate date where this is not possible.

== Overview ==
Although contacts between Russia and Western Europe date to the eighth century, the first significant descriptions of Russia appear only in the mid-13th century, around the time of the Mongol invasions. These are the travel accounts of Friar Julian, Giovanni da Pian del Carpine, Benedict of Poland, and William of Rubruck. For these four travellers, who ventured to the Eurasian Steppe and East Asia, Russia served as a stopover and was therefore the last Christian country before they crossed into the steppes.

The first systematic description of Russia was written by Marco Polo in 1298–1299. Although Polo never actually visited Russia, he received supplementary information about the country from officials at the Mongol great khan's court. In addition, he encountered Russians during his travels. No new significant descriptions of Russia are found in Western European sources throughout the 14th century, although Western European travellers still regularly visited Russia, particularly Hanseatic merchants, who mainly conducted business in Pskov and Novgorod.

The only significant description of Russia from the early 15th century is the travel account of Ghillebert de Lannoy, who visited Pskov and Novgorod in the winter of 1413. It was not until the late 15th century, during the Renaissance, that new and exhaustive descriptions of Russia appeared in Western European sources. Although real interest in Russia began in the 16th century, these medieval travel accounts demonstrate a certain level of knowledge dating back to the 13th century, as well as the emergence of the first stereotypes.

== List ==
- 922: Ahmed ibn Fadlan, travelled from Bagdad to near Kazan, saw Vikings;
- c. 950: Ahmad ibn Rustah, went to Novgorod;
- c. 1237: Friar Julian, went to Volga Bulgaria and passed Russia;
- c. 1241: Snorri Sturluson, historian who described Rus' chieftains as typical Vikings;
- c. 1245–1247: Giovanni da Pian del Carpine, went to Mongolia and passed Russia;
- c. 1245–1247: Benedict of Poland, went to Mongolia and passed Russia;
- c. 1255: William of Rubruck, went to Mongolia and passed Russia;
- c. 1300: Marco Polo, mentioned Russia as a distant country in the far north;
- 1413: Ghillebert de Lannoy, visited Pskov and Novgorod;
- 1476: Ambrogio Contarini, the Venetian ambassador to Persia, passed through Moscow, early printed source;
- 1486: Iurii Trakhaniot, the Muscovite ambassador to Milan, interviewed by Milanese officials, although their report possibly not published;
- 1487: Giosafat Barbaro, a Venetian who went to the Sea of Azov, published 1543;
- 1515: Jacob Piso, Polish anti-Russian propagandist, never in Russia;
- 1517: Maciej Miechowita, "first accurate geography of Eastern Europe";
- 1519: Christian Bomhover, Teutonic Knight, first book solely on Russia, very hostile, never visited Russia, little cited by later authors;
- 1525–1543: Albert Compense, Paolo Giovo, and Johan Fabri, favorable accounts in interest of church union, never in Russia;
- c. 1527: Sigismund von Herberstein, Habsburg ambassador to Moscow, saw government as despotic, much copied by later writers;
- 1553: Richard Chancellor, reached Muscovy via the White Sea, wrote Booke of the Great and Mighty Emperor of Russia;
- 1561–1583: during the Livonian War, a number of anti-Russian pamphlets published in the German lands;
- 1578: Heinrich von Staden, German soldier in the oprichnina;
- 1586: Antonio Possevino, papal diplomat;
- 1589: Richard Hakluyt, published voyages of the Muscovy Company;
- 1589: Anthony Jenkinson, with Muscovy Company, went to Moscow, Astrakhan, Bukhara and Persia, published in Hakluyt;
- 1591: Giles Fletcher, the Elder, English ambassador to Muscovy, wrote Of the Russe Common Wealth;
- 1607: Jacques Margeret, French mercenary, "first printed French book on Russia";
- 1610: Isaac Massa, Dutch merchant and envoy, via White Sea;
- 1615: Peter Petreius, Swedish diplomat, wrote History of the Grand Duchy of Moscow;
- 1617: Conrad Bussow, German involved in the Time of Troubles;
- 1621: Jerome Horsey, with Muscovy Company;
- 1647: Adam Olearius, Holstein ambassador to Persia via Muscovy and the Volga;
- 1653: Paul of Aleppo, favorable view of an Orthodox theocracy, in Arabic, first English translation in 1829;
- 1663: Juraj Križanić, Croat and proto pan-Slavist, advocated liberalizing reforms similar to the later enlightened despotism;
- 1671: Samuel Collins, physician to the tsar;
- c. 1678: Nicolae Milescu, Moldavian in Siberia and China;
- c. 1680: Patrick Gordon, Scots soldier, left diary;
- 1682: John Milton, wrote A Brief History of Muscovy, compiled from other sources;
- 1687: Foy de la Neuville, possibly travelled in Russia;
- 1701: Dembei, Japanese castaway taken to St. Petersburg;
- 1712: Tulishen, Manchu ambassador to Russia and the Kalmycks;
- 1721: Friedrich Christian Weber, German diplomat;
- c. 1723: Lorenz Lange, Swede in Siberia and China;
- 1729–1732: two Chinese embassies to Russia;
- c. 1733: Johan Gustaf Renat, Swede captured by Russians and then Dzungars, mapped Siberia and Dzungaria;
- 1746? Georg Wilhelm Steller, journals of the Bering expedition;
- 1751: Johann Georg Gmelin, with Bering, botany of Siberia;
- 1757: Gerhard Friedrich Müller, with Bering, examined Siberian archives;
- 1771: Peter Simon Pallas, German natural historian;
- 1784: William Richardson, Scots traveler;
- c. 1829: Alexander von Humboldt, German naturalist;
- 1839: Marquis de Custine, very hostile;
- 1847: August von Haxthausen, publicized the peasant commune;
- 1870: George Kennan, in eastern Siberia;
- 1876: Edward Delmar Morgan, British traveler and translator;
- 1877: Donald Mackenzie Wallace, British journalist;
- 1894: Constance Garnett, translated Russian novels;
- 1909: Jeremiah Curtin, visited Buryats;
- 1913–1919: Arthur Ransome, English author, journalist and translator who witnessed revolution;
- 1919: John Reed, witnessed revolution.

== See also ==
- For the Soviet period see Category:Writers about the Soviet Union

== Sources ==
- Marshall T. Poe, "A People Born to Slavery: Russia in Early Modern European Ethnography, 1476–1748", 2000
- Anthony Cross, "In the Lands of the Romanovs: An annotated bibliography of first-hand English-language accounts of the Russian Empire (1613–1917), 2014
