= Tartar Relation =

1247 ethnographic report

The start of the Tartar Relation in the Lucerne manuscript. The rubric (red) above the first line reads Incipit hystoria tartarorum.

The Tartar Relation (Latin: Hystoria Tartarorum, "History of the Tartars") is an ethnographic report on the Mongol Empire composed by a certain C. de Bridia in Latin in 1247. It is one of the most detailed accounts of the history and customs of the Mongols to appear in Europe around that time.

== Circumstances of composition ==
The Relation is one of several reports produced by the Franciscan mission dispatched by Pope Innocent IV to the courts of Batu Khan and Güyük Khan in 1245. This mission was led by Giovanni da Pian del Carpine, who was accompanied by Benedict of Poland and the Bohemians Ceslaus and Stephen. During their return journey through Europe, Carpine wrote that they were obliged to hand over drafts of their official report to the curious. The official report by Carpine is known as the Ystoria Mongalorum. In October 1247, Benedict also dictated an account known as the De itinere Fratrum Minorum ad Tartaros.

The circumstances of the genesis of the Tartar Relation are unclear, although the date of its completion is known precisely: 30 July 1247. The author, C. de Bridia, is not otherwise known and his first name is initialized in the manuscripts. He describes himself modestly as "least among the Franciscans". He is generally thought to have been Polish, and his surname may indicate that he came from Brzeg in Poland.

Marian Plezia believes he was one of the members of the embassy who stayed at the court of Batu and did not go on to Güyük. In this case, the work is partially based on his own experiences and partially on the reports of his colleagues. George D. Painter, on the other hand, argued that de Bridia wrote the account based on a lecture given by Benedict of Poland, probably in Germany, since the manuscript tradition of the text is associated with the Upper Rhineland. Benedict's own De itinere was written in Cologne. Tadeusz Bieńkowski argues for its composition in Wrocław or Kraków, while others have suggested Prague. The friars did travel through Poland on their return journey, and Benedict had probably composed a draft of his own report by then. Gregory Guzman argues that Benedict must have given lectures in his native Polish, which de Bridia translated into Latin.

Some parts of the Relation are certainly borrowed from the Ystoria.

== Manuscripts ==
The Tartar Relation is known from two manuscripts, both also containing the Speculum historiale of Vincent of Beauvais. The earlier dates to 1338–1340 and the later to about 1440. The latter was first brought to public attention in 1965 because it had been bound with the Vinland map, a modern forgery. It is part of the Beinecke collection at Yale University Library. Unlike the map, the Relation was generally accepted by scholars as authentic, although there were dissenters. In 2006, an earlier copy of the text in the Lucerne Central and University Library was brought to public attention (having been catalogued as early as 1959).

The start of the Tartar Relation in the Yale manuscript. The rubric above the first line reads Incipit hystoria tartarorum.

The Lucerne manuscript (Latin MS P Msc 13.2°) is written in Gothic script. The scribe, Hugo de Tennach, was employed by Peter of Bebelnhein, a teacher in the cathedral of Basel and the prior of Saint Martin's Church in Colmar. He wrote out not only the Tartar Relation but all four volumes of the Speculum. These four manuscripts belonged to the abbey of Pairis until in 1420 they were pawned to the abbey of Saint Urban for 110 Rhenish guilders. The Relation is bound in the fourth volume, although it may once have been part of the third. The Yale manuscript (Beinecke MS 350A) is also associated with the Upper Rhineland and was probably made at Basel. The Lucerne manuscript is all parchment, while the Yale is a mix of parchment and paper. The Yale manuscript is written in bastard cursive.

Colophons in the Lucerne manuscript give the title of the work as Hystoria Tartarorum and specify that it is not part of the Speculum historiale, which contains material on the Mongols derived from the Ystoria Mongalorum and the lost Historia Tartarorum of Simon of Saint-Quentin. The Yale manuscript may be a copy of the Lucerne, but it is more likely they both derive from the same exemplar. They certainly belong to the same manuscript family. The title Tartar Relation, coined by Painter for his 1965 edition, has stuck.

== Content ==
The text of the Relation is almost identical at parts with the Ystoria Mongalorum, but it is not simply a version of Carpine's text. It differs in tone and purpose. Its portrayal of the Mongols (and the Jews) is far more negative. It also lacks the strategic purpose of the Ystoria, preferring to describe the Mongols as divine punishment on Christians. Religious references are pervasive. Gregory Werner proposes that the Relation is "an eschatological reinterpretation of Carpine's account [and] a complement to [it]".

The Relation is dedicated to Boguslaus, "minister of the [Franciscan] friars who live in Bohemia and Poland", and the author claims to be writing in obedience to Boguslaus' authority, suggesting that the text was commissioned. It is an ethnographic report, although it also contains legendary material borrowed from the mirabilia (wonders) genre, perhaps because, as a non-traveler, de Bridia considered them missing from the accounts of the travelers. It reports the existence of dog-face people, ox-footed people and other monstrous races typical of the genre. Another people, the Parossits, appear to be the actual Permians. The Samoyeds are also mentioned. The magnetic island from the legend of Sinbad the Sailor is also incorporated. It is called Narayrgen, which is said to come from the Tatar for "Men of the Sun".

Compared to the Ystoria and Benedict's De itinere, the Relation lacks information on the friars' travels. It is more focused on Mongol history, customs and plans. For its time, its account of Mongol history, genealogies and methods of warfare are among the most detailed. It covers the Mongol invasion of Europe from the 1220s through the 1240s, correctly crediting the invasion to Jochi's command rather than Batu's, as all other western sources do. His account of Genghis Khan's rise, however, is marred by legendary material, such as his encounter with Gog and Magog, inspired by the Alexander Romance.

In places, the text of the Relation uses the correct spelling Tataros rather than the corrupt form Tartaros common in Europe. It records that the Mongols called the pope the "great pope throughout the West" (magnum papam per totum occidentem). Like Friar Julian and the Tractatus de ortu Tartarorum, the Relation portrays the Mongols as operating on three distinct fronts: against the Sultanate of Egypt, against the Sultanate of Rum (Anatolia) and against the Hungarians and Poles.

== Editions ==
- Önnerfors, Alf, ed. (1967). Hystoria Tartarorum C. de Bridia Monachi. Berlin: Walter de Gruyter.
- Skelton, R. A.; Marston, Thomas E.; Painter, George D. (1995) [1965]. The Vinland Map and The Tartar Relation (New ed.). Yale University Press.

== Bibliography ==
- Connell, Charles W. (2000). "Bridia, C. de (fl. c. 1245 C.E.)". In John Block Friedman; Kristen Mossler Figg (eds.). Trade, Travel and Exploration in the Middle Ages: An Encyclopedia. Routledge. pp. 74–75.
- Czarnowus, Anna (2014). "The Mongols, Eastern Europe, and Western Europe: The Mirabilia Tradition in Benedict of Poland's Historia Tartarorum and John of Plano Carpini's Historia Mongalorum". Literature Compass. 11 (7): 484–495. doi:10.1111/lic3.12150.
- Guzman, Gregory G. (2000). "Benedict the Pole (fl. 1240s)". In John Block Friedman; Kristen Mossler Figg (eds.). Trade, Travel and Exploration in the Middle Ages: An Encyclopedia. Routledge. pp. 57–58.
- Guzman, Gregory G. (2006). "The Vinland Map Controversy and the Discovery of a Second Version of The Tartar Relation: The Authenticity of the 1339 Text". Terrae Incognitae. 38 (1): 19–25. doi:10.1179/tin.2006.38.1.19.
- Jackson, Peter (2005). The Mongols and the West, 1221–1410. Routledge.
- Jackson, Peter (2016). "The Testimony of the Russian 'Archbishop' Peter Concerning the Mongols (1244/5): Precious Intelligence or Timely Disinformation?". Journal of the Royal Asiatic Society. 26 (1–2): 65–77. doi:10.1017/s135618631500084x.
- Werner, Gregor (2016). "Travelling Towards the Peoples of the Endtime: C de Bridia as Religious Re-interpretation of Carpini". In Wolfram Brandes; Felicitas Schmieder; Rebekka Voß (eds.). Peoples of the Apocalypse: Eschatological Beliefs and Political Scenarios. De Gruyter. pp. 83–95. doi:10.1515/9783110473315-005. ISBN 978-3-11-047331-5.
