= Chronology of European exploration of Asia =

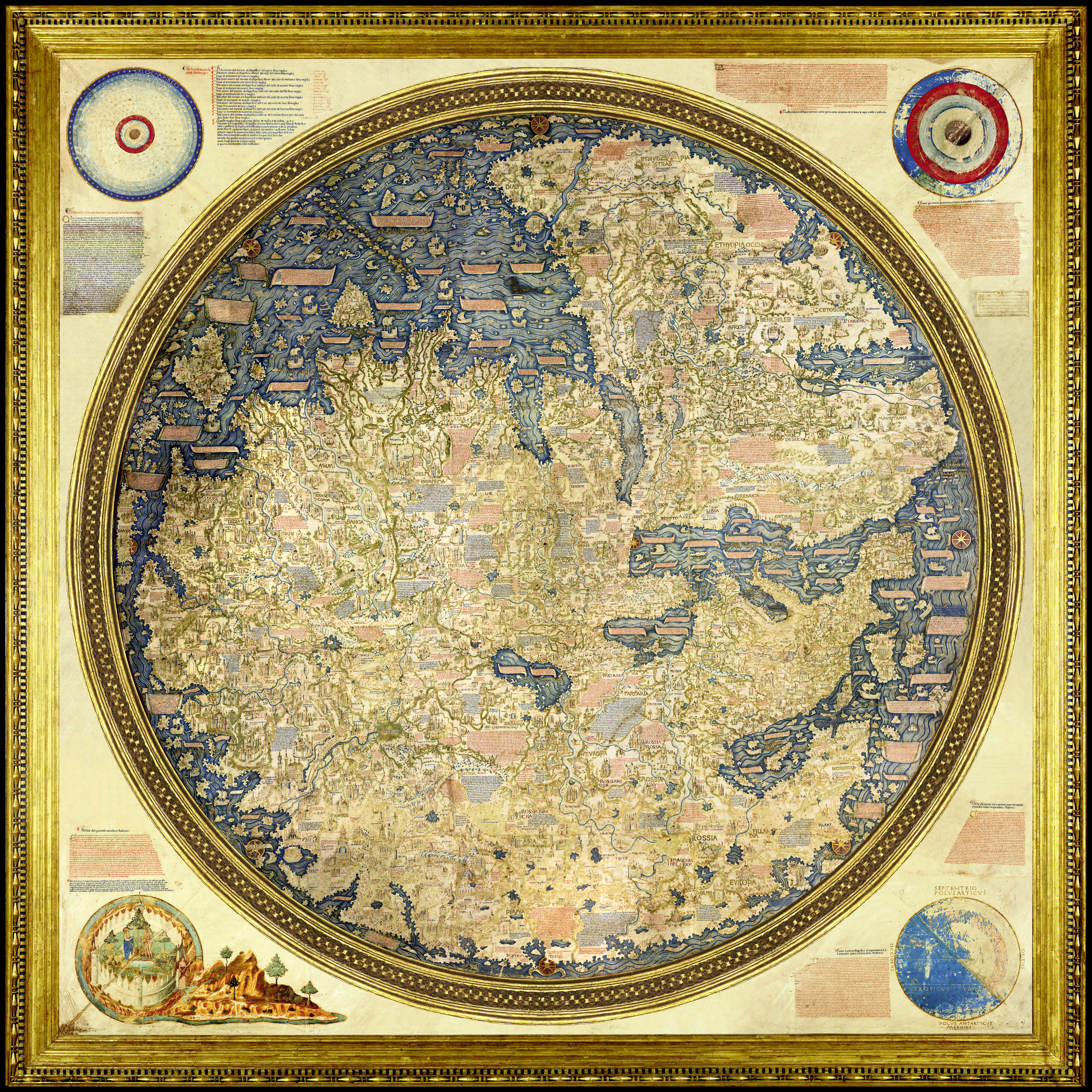
The Fra Mauro map, completed around 1459, is a map of the then-known world. Following the standard practice at that time, south is at the top. The map was said by Giovanni Battista Ramusio to have been partially based on the one brought from Cathay by Marco Polo.

This is a chronology of the early European exploration of Asia.

== First wave of exploration (mainly by land) ==
=== Antiquity ===
- 515 BC: Scylax explores the Indus and the sea route across the Indian Ocean to Egypt.
- 330 BC: Alexander the Great conquers parts of Central Asia and parts of northwestern India.
- 300 BC: Seleucus Nicator, founder of the Seleucid Empire, forays into northwestern India but is defeated by Chandragupta Maurya, founder of the Maurya Empire, and they become allies soon after.
- 250 – 120 BC: Greco-Bactrian states in parts of Central Asia and South Asia, including the Fergana Valley (Alexandria Eschate), Transoxiana (Alexandria on the Oxus) and Punjab (Alexandria on the Indus).
- 180 BC – 10 AD: The Indo-Greek Kingdom was located in areas now part of Afghanistan, Pakistan and north-west India.
- 30 BC – 640 AD: With the acquisition of Ptolemaic Egypt, the Romans begin trading with India. The Empire now has a direct connection to the Spice trade Egypt had established beginning in 118 BC.
- 41 – 54 AD: Roman Mediterranean tax collector Annius Plocamus, facilitated direct trade and first contact between Sri Lanka and the Roman Empire. The Romans already knew about Sri Lanka under the name of Taprobane, the Greek name for the island. It is according to Pliny as said in Natural History that the two civilizations met after the landing of Plocamus.
- 100 – 166 AD: Romano-Chinese relations begin. Ptolemy writes of the Golden Chersonese (i.e. Malay Peninsula) and the trade port of Kattigara, now identified as Óc Eo in southern Vietnam. The Chinese historical texts describe Roman embassies, from a land they called Daqin.
- 2nd century: Roman traders reach Siam (Thailand), Cambodia, Sumatra, and Java on their way to China.
- 161: An embassy from Roman Emperor Antoninus Pius or his successor Marcus Aurelius reaches Chinese Emperor Huan of Han at Luoyang.
- 226: A Roman diplomat or merchant lands in northern Vietnam and visits Nanjing, China and the court of Sun Quan, ruler of Eastern Wu.

=== Middle Ages ===
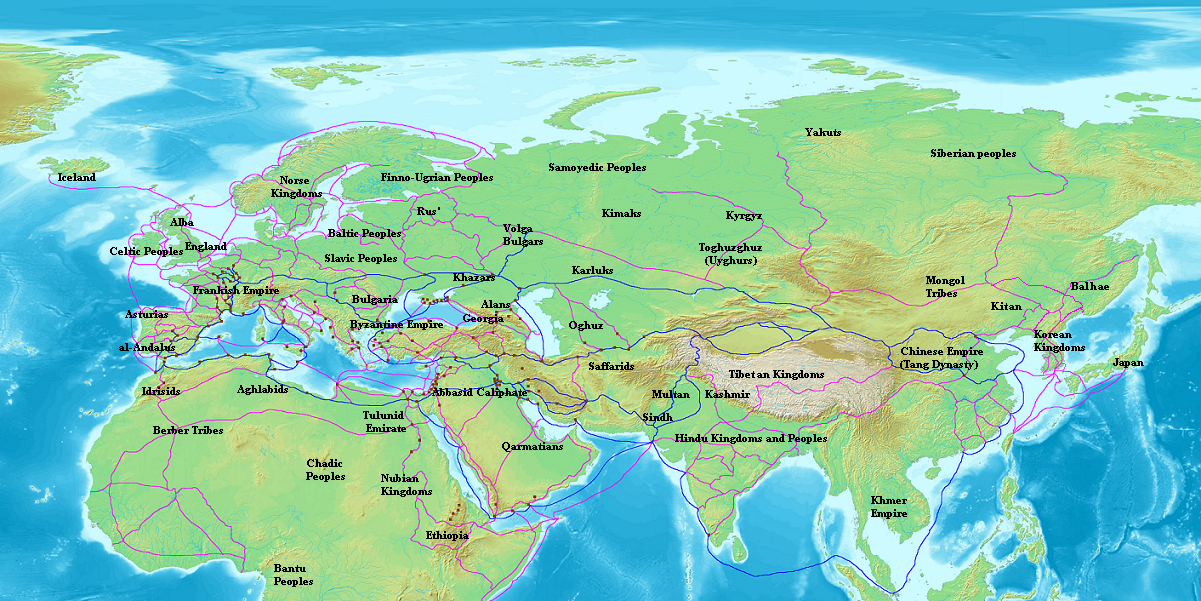
Trade routes in Eurasia and north Africa c. 870 CE

- ~500–1000: The Radhanites were medieval Jewish merchants who dominated trade between the Christian and Islamic worlds during the early Middle Ages and travelled as far as Tang-dynasty China.
- ~550: Byzantine traveler and author Cosmas Indicopleustes completes his work Christian Topography describing geographical features gleaned from his own travels to Eritrea, Ethiopia, India, and Sri Lanka.
- ~552: Two Persian monks (or perhaps emissaries disguised as monks), at the behest of Eastern Roman (Byzantine) emperor Justinian I, travel to China and smuggle silkworms back to the Eastern Roman Empire, thus enabling silk production in Europe and Asia Minor.
- 568: The Eastern Roman (Byzantine) general Zemarchus travels to Samarkand and the court of the Western Turkic Kaganate.
- 639–640: The Rashidun Caliphate conquers Egypt, thus severing most direct Eastern-Roman (and hence European) trade with India and eastern Asia.
- 1160–1173: The Navarrese Jewish Rabbi Benjamin of Tudela visits Syria, Palestine, Baghdad, Persia, and the Arabian Peninsula.
- 1180–1186: Pethahiah of Regensburg goes to Baghdad.
- 13th century: Silk Road trade reaches its height during the height of the Pax Mongolica, the relative peace in Asia during the widespread unification under the Mongol Empire.
- 1245–1247: The Italian Franciscan Giovanni da Pian del Carpine appointed Papal Legate and accompanied by Stephen of Bohemia, and later by Benedykt Polak, reaches Karakorum in present-day Mongolia. First European embassy to the Great Khan.
- 1245–1248: The Italian Ascelin of Lombardia, Simon of St Quentin and Andrew of Longjumeau go to Armenia and Persia.
- 1249–1251: Andrew of Longjumeau guides a French ambassador to the great Kuyuk Khan. Andrew's brother Guy and several others — John Goderiche, John of Carcassonne, Herbert "Le Sommelier", Gerbert of Sens, Robert (a clerk), a certain William, and an unnamed clerk of Poissy go with him. They reach Talas in northwestern Kyrgyzstan.
- ~1254: The Flemish William of Rubruck reaches Mongolia through Central Asia.
- 1264–c. 1269: First expedition of the Italians Niccolò and Maffeo Polo to China. In 1266 they reach Kublai Khan's seat at Dadu (now known as Beijing) in China.
- 1271–1295: Second trip of Niccolò and Maffeo Polo to China. This time with Marco, Niccolo's son, who would pass down a colourful account of their experiences traveling throughout Asia. The details of this account are currently debated.
- 1275–1289 & 1289–1328: The Italian John of Montecorvino (1246–1328), a Franciscan missionary, traveller and statesman, founds the earliest Roman Catholic missions in India and China, and becomes archbishop of Peking, and Patriarch of the Orient.
- ~1318–1329: Travels of the Franciscan friars, the Italian Odoric of Pordenone and James of Ireland via India, Ceylon and the Malay Peninsula to China where they stayed in Dadu (present day Beijing) for approximately three years before returning to Italy overland through Central Asia.
- ~1321–1330/1338(?): The French Dominican missionary Jordanus, made bishop over the whole Indian subcontinent in 1329, wrote down his travels through India and the Middle East in his book Mirabilia.
- 1322: The Travels of Sir John Mandeville. Mandeville was said to be a knight from St. Albans in England. Although the book is real, it is widely believed that "Sir John Mandeville" was not. The book describes the travels of Mandeville going through Turkey (Asia Minor and Cilicia), Persia, Tartary, Syria, Arabia, India and many countries around India (including Sri Lanka).
- 1338–1353: Expedition of the Italian Giovanni de' Marignolli, one of four chief envoys sent by Pope Benedict XII to Peking.
- 1401–1402: Travel of Payo Gómez de Sotomayor, first ambassador of Henry III of Castile to the Timurid Empire.
- 1403–1404: Travel of Ruy González de Clavijo, second ambassador of Henry III of Castile to the Timurid Empire. He passed along the Black Sea coast of Turkey to Trabzon and then overland through Armenia, Azerbaijan, Iran and Turkmenistan to Uzbekistan. He also visited Tehran.
- 1420–1436: Travels of the Italian explorer Niccolò de' Conti to India and Southeast Asia.
- 1436–1439: Travels of Pedro Tafur across Middle East.
- 1453: Constantinople falls to the Muslim Ottoman Turks, breaking the trade links between Christian Europe and Asia.
- 1470: Travels of Afanasy Nikitin, the first Russian to visit India.
- 1471–1479: The Italian Venetian diplomats Caterino Zeno, Ambrogio Contarini and Giosafat Barbaro travel to Persia.
- 1487–1491: Portuguese explorer and spy Pero da Covilhã travels to the Near East and India under the orders of the King of Portugal to gather information necessary for successfully establishing a sea route between Portugal and India.
- 1557–1572: The English traveler, diplomat and explorer Anthony Jenkinson travels across the Caspian Sea to Bukhara and Persia.
- ~1580–1585:The Cossack Yermak Timofeyevich reaches the Siberian Tatar city of Qashliq near the right bank of Irtysh.
- 1583–1591: The English merchant Ralph Fitch, together with John Newberry and John Eldred, a jeweller named William Leedes and a painter, James Story, travelled via the Levant and Mesopotamia to India and Portuguese Malacca (in modern Malaysia). Eldred stayed in Basra, Iraq; Story joined the Jesuits in Goa; Leedes stayed in Agra to work for Akbar and Newberry decided to begin his return journey. Fitch went by himself to Burma and Malacca (today in Malaysia). He returned to London in 1591.
- 1643: Kurbat Ivanov reaches Lake Baikal.
- 1644: Vasily Poyarkov, travelling overland from Siberia, reaches the mouth of the Amur on the Pacific Ocean.

== Second wave of exploration (by sea) ==
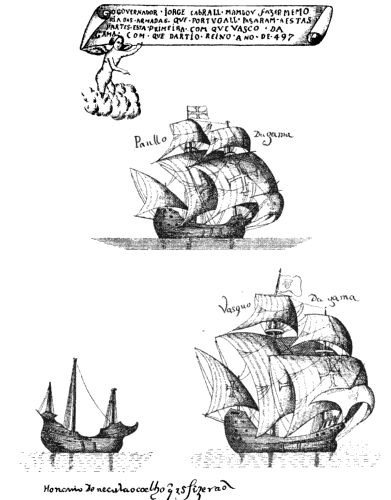
The ships which were used by Vasco da Gama on his first voyage. (Illustration from 1558).

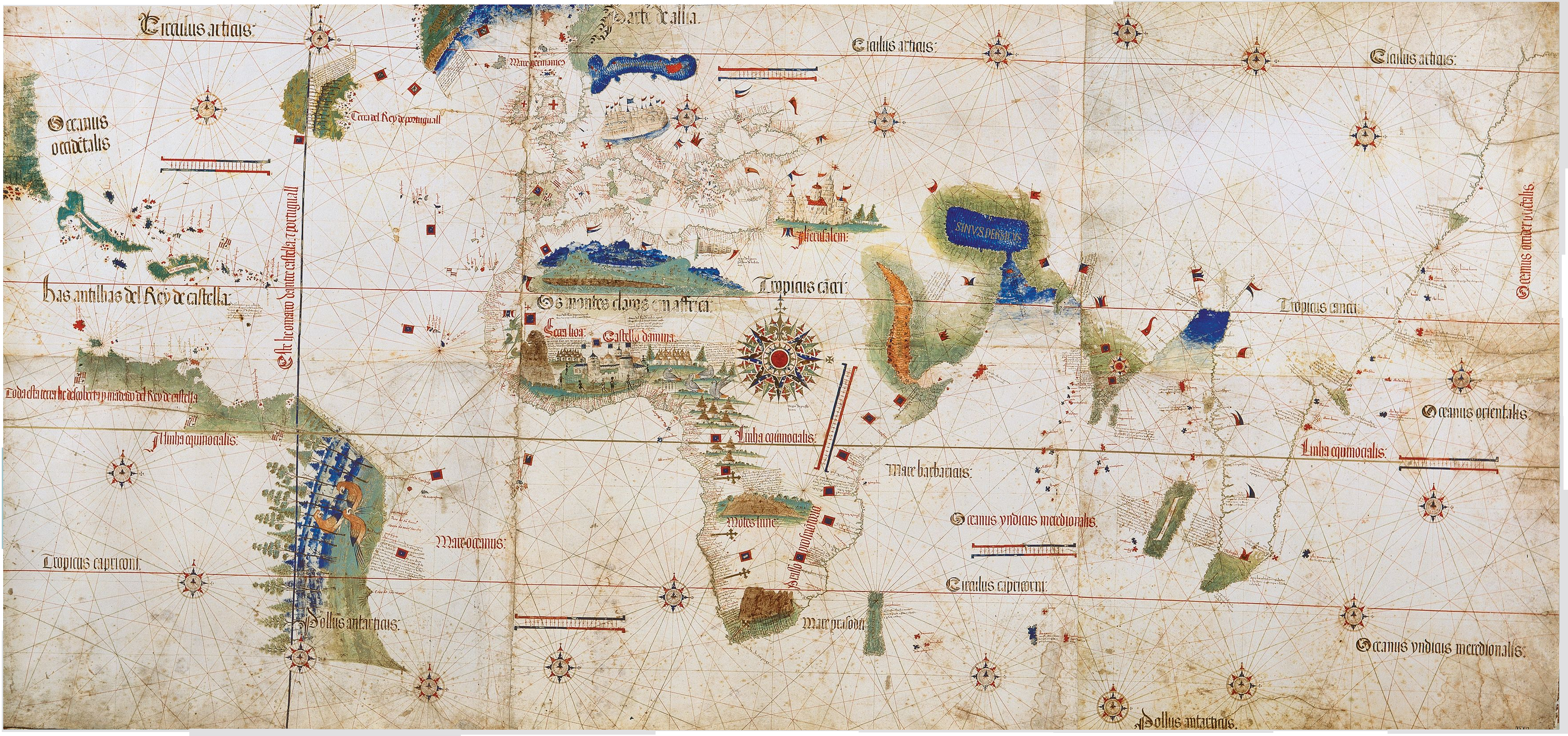
The Cantino planisphere (or Cantino World Map) of 1502 is the earliest surviving map showing Portuguese Discoveries in the east and west.

- 1488: Bartolomeu Dias reaches the Cape of Good Hope in South Africa. This was an important milestone because this allowed future sailors like Vasco da Gama to sail to India and Southeast Asia.
- 1492: Christopher Columbus sets sail from Spain in search of a western route to Asia, eventually landing in the Americas. Though unsuccessful in reaching Asia his successes propelled eventual European expansion, including Asia.
- 1497–1499: The Portuguese Vasco da Gama, accompanied by Nicolau Coelho and Bartolomeu Dias, is the first European to reach India by an all-sea route from Europe.
- 1500–1501: After discovering Brazil, Pedro Álvares Cabral, with the half of an original fleet of 13 ships and 1,500 men, accomplished the second Portuguese trip to India. Boats were commanded by Cabral, Bartolomeu Dias, Nicolau Coelho, Sancho de Tovar, Simão de Miranda, Aires Gomes da Silva, Vasco de Ataíde, Diogo Dias, Simão de Pina, Luís Pires, Pero de Ataíde and Nuno Leitão da Cunha. It is not known which one between Gaspar de Lemos and André Gonçalves, commanded the ship which returned to Portugal with the news of the discovery. Luís Pires returned to Portugal just after reaching Cape Verde. Vasco de Ataíde, Bartolomeu Dias, Simão de Pina and Aires Gomes' ships were lost near the Cape of Good Hope. The ship commanded by Diogo Dias separated and discovered Madagascar. He was then the first to reach the Red Sea by boat. Nuno Leitão da Cunha, Nicolau Coelho, Sancho de Tovar, Simão de Miranda, Pero de Ataíde did the entire trip to India. Among other passengers were: Pero Vaz de Caminha and the Franciscan father, Frei Henrique de Coimbra.
- 1501–?: João da Nova commands the third Portuguese expedition to India. He discovers Ascension Island (1501) and Saint Helena (1502) along the way.
- 1502–1503: Second trip of Vasco da Gama to India.
- 1503–1504: Afonso de Albuquerque establishes the first Portuguese fort in Kochi, India, during the fifth Portuguese India Armada.
- 1505: Francisco de Almeida is appointed as the first viceroy of Portuguese India (Estado da Índia). He leaves Lisbon at the command of the seventh Portuguese India Armada, with 22 ships, including 14 carracks and 6 caravels carrying a crew of 1,000 and 1,500 soldiers. His son, Lourenço de Almeida, explores the southern coast and reaches the modern island of Sri Lanka.
- 1507–1513: In 1507, Afonso de Albuquerque captures the kingdom of Ormus in the Persian Gulf. He is then appointed second viceroy of India in 1508. In 1510 he conquers Goa, soon to become the most flourishing of the Portuguese settlements in India.
- 1511: Albuquerque conquers Malacca discovered by Diogo Lopes de Sequeira in 1509. Malacca becomes a strategic base for Portuguese expansion in the East Indies. In November of that year, after having secured Malacca and learning of the "Spice islands" (Banda Islands) location, in Maluku Albuquerque sent an expedition of three vessels led by António de Abreu to find them. In 1511, Siam receives a diplomatic mission from the Portuguese. In 1516, Siam and Portugal concluded a treaty granting the Portuguese trading rights in the country.
- 1512: Malay pilots guided the Portuguese via Java, the Lesser Sundas and Ambon to Banda, arriving in early 1512. The first Europeans to reach the Banda Islands, the expedition remained in Banda for about one month, purchasing nutmeg and mace, and cloves in which Banda had a thriving entrepôt trade. D'Abreu sailed through Ambon while his second in command Francisco Serrão went ahead towards Maluku islands, was shipwrecked and ended up in Ternate. Francisco Serrão establishes a fort on Ternate Island.
- 1513: Albuquerque laid siege to Aden in 1513, but was repulsed. He then led a voyage into the Red Sea, the first ever made by a European fleet.
- 1513: Jorge Álvares is the first European to land in China at Tamão in the Zhujiang (Pearl River) estuary.
- 1516–1517: Rafael Perestrello, a cousin of Christopher Columbus, leads a small Portuguese trade mission to Canton (Guangzhou), then under the Ming Dynasty.
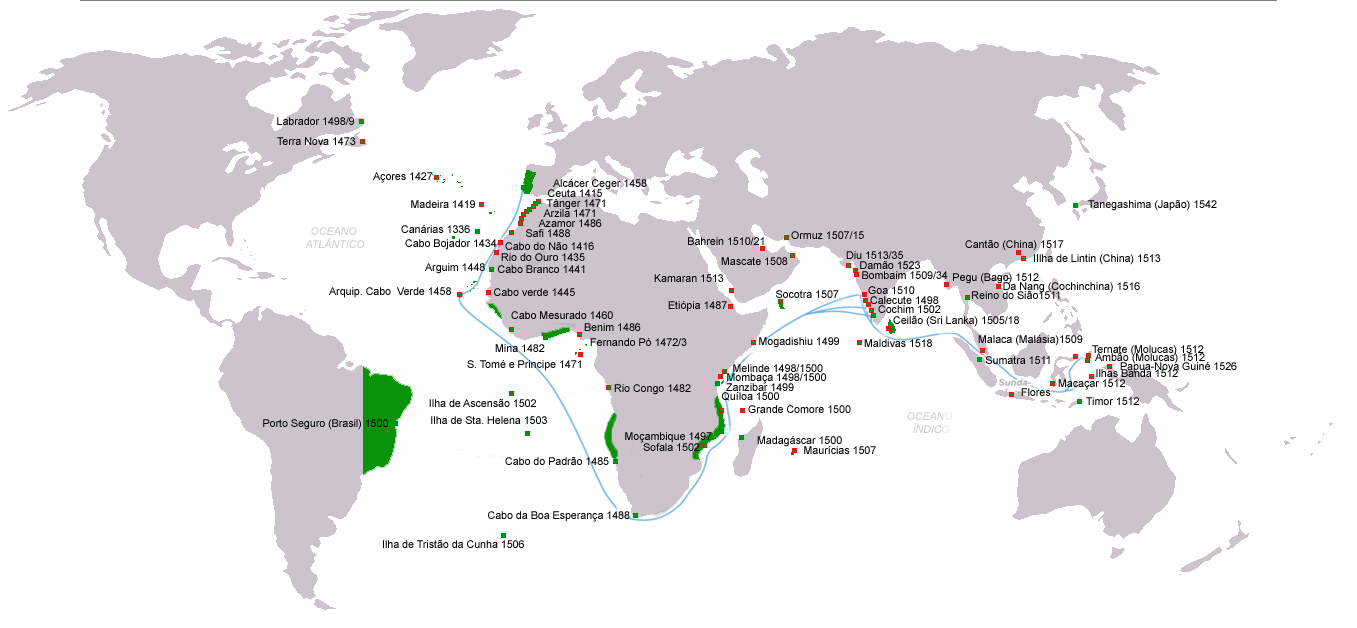
  Portuguese discoveries and explorations: first arrival places and dates
- 1517: The Portuguese merchant Fernão Pires de Andrade establishes the first European trade post on the Chinese coast at Tamão in the Zhujiang (Pearl River) estuary and then in Canton (Guangzhou).
- 1519–1522: Leaving Spain with five ships and 270 men in 1519, the Portuguese Ferdinand Magellan is the first to reach Asia from the East. In 1520, he discovers what is now known as the Strait of Magellan. In 1521 he reaches the Marianas and then the island of Homonhon in the Philippines. Some time after, Magellan is killed in what is known as the Battle of Mactan. The rest of the crew sails to Palawan (Philippines), and then to Brunei and Borneo. They then reach Tidore in the Maluku Islands avoiding the Portuguese. Only one ship, commanded by Juan Sebastián Elcano, returns to Spain in 1522 with 18 men remaining, accomplishing the first World circumnavigation in History.
- 1524: Third trip of Vasco da Gama to India.
- 1542: António da Mota is thrown by a storm to the island of Tanegashima, establishing the first European contact with Japan.
- 1549: Saint Francis Xavier arrives in Japan accompanied by Father Cosme de Torrès, Brother Juan Fernández, the Japanese Anjiro, two baptized Japanese named Antonio and Joane, a Chinese named Manuel, and an Indian named Amador. The captain of the ship is named Avan aka "The Pirate".
- 1556: The Dominican Gaspar da Cruz is the first modern missionary to go in China. He traveled to Guangzhou in 1556 and wrote the first complete book on China and the Ming Dynasty that was published in Europe; it included information on its geography, provinces, royalty, official class, bureaucracy, shipping, architecture, farming, craftsmanship, merchant affairs, clothing, religious and social customs, music and instruments, writing, education, and justice. (See also Jesuit China missions)

Left panels 1-3

Right panels 4-6

Kunyu Wanguo Quantu, printed by Matteo Ricci, Zhong Wentao and Li Zhizao, upon request of Wanli Emperor in Beijing, 1602, the first world map in the Chinese language
- 1582: The Italian Jesuit priest and missionary Matteo Ricci reaches the Portuguese settlement of Macau in Ming China and in 1601 becomes the first European to be invited into the Ming imperial palace of the Forbidden City in Beijing, at the behest of the Wanli Emperor who sought his services at court, particularly for his expertise in astronomy. In 1602 Ricci and his Chinese translator Li Zhizao would co-publish the first world map in Chinese, the Kunyu Wanguo Quantu which greatly expanded both Chinese and Japanese knowledge of global geography.
- 1583–91: The Englishman Ralph Fitch becomes one of the earliest English explorers to visit Mesopotamia, India, and Southeast Asia (Burma, Lan Na, Malacca).
- 1595: The Dutchman Jan Huyghen van Linschoten published his Reys-gheschrift vande navigatien der Portugaloysers in Orienten ("Travel Accounts of Portuguese Navigation in the Orient") which was translated into English and German in 1598. It gave access to secret Portuguese information, including the nautical maps which had been well guarded for over a century. The book thus broke the Portuguese monopoly on the sea trade with Asia.

== Other noteworthy Europeans ==
- 1579–1619: Thomas Stephens, a Jesuit, was probably the first Englishman to set foot in India where he died in 1619.
- 1599–1614: John Mildenhall, with Richard Newman, reach Agra, India, overland in 1614.
- 1600–1610: William Adams's boat arrives in Japan where he spends the next 10 years as advisor to the shōgun Tokugawa Ieyasu.
- 1602–1607: Bento de Góis, first European to travel overland from India to China.
- 160?–1611: Robert Coverte comes back from India by foot after his ship runs aground near Surat.
- 1612–1617: Thomas Coryat travels by foot to India.
- 1615–1618: Thomas Roe is ambassador to the court at Agra, India of the Mughal emperor Jahangir.
- 1624: António de Andrade, first European to reach Tibet.
- 1626–1627: Estêvão Cacella with João Cabral are the first Europeans to reach Bhutan.
- 1631–1668: Jean-Baptiste Tavernier travels six times to Asia, mostly in Persia, India and Java.
- 1656–1669: François Bernier travels to Egypt, Saudi Arabia and then spend eight years at the court of the Mughal emperor Aurangzeb.
- 1664–1680: Jean Chardin travels two times to Persia (as well as its dependencies in the Caucasus such as Georgia) and India.
- 1675–1678: The Moldavian boyar Nicolae Milescu travels to China.

== Noteworthy others ==
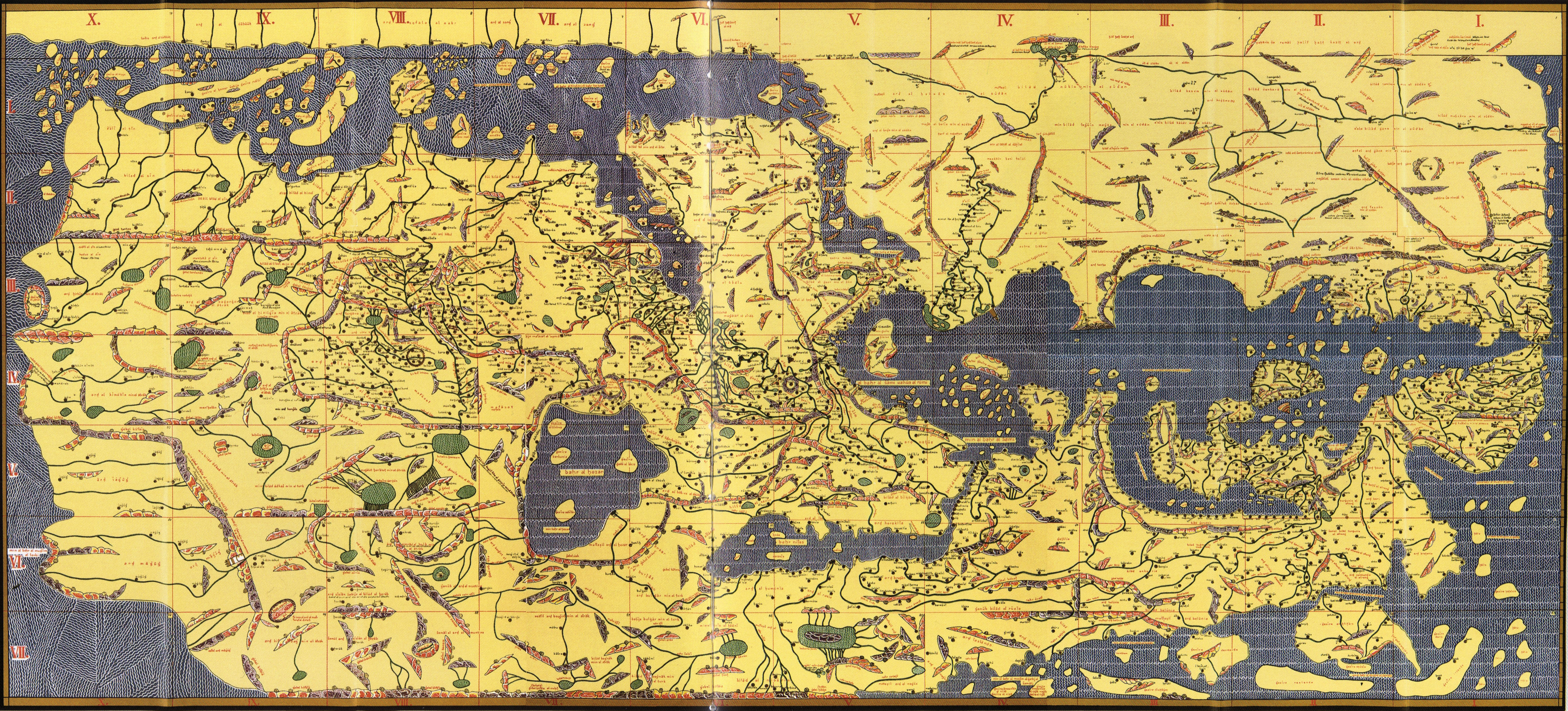
The Tabula Rogeriana (1154), by Muhammad al-Idrisi

- ~118 BCE: Eudoxus of Cyzicus was a Greek navigator from the Asian-Greek city of Cyzicus who explored the Arabian Sea for Ptolemy VIII, king of the Hellenistic Ptolemaic dynasty in Egypt.
- 522–550: Cosmas Indicopleustes (lit. "who sailed to India") of Alexandria was a Greek merchant, and later monk, who made several voyages to India during the reign of emperor Justinian. His Topografia Christiana contained some of the earliest and most famous world maps.
- 1154: Although not known for his travels, Muhammad al-Idrisi was significant for the European exploration of Asia when he made the Tabula Rogeriana, a map of the whole known world, in 1154 for the Norman King Roger II of Sicily, based on his knowledge of the Arab trade routes.
- 1247 and 1254: Hetoum I, king of the Armenian Kingdom of Cilicia and ally of the Frankish crusader states, visits the Mongol court in Karakoram in 1254 after first sending his brother Sempad in 1247.
- 1325–1355: Travels of Ibn Battuta, a Muslim traveller from Morocco, across much of the Old World. His Travels would be influential with Europeans starting in the 19th century.

== See also ==
- Silk Road
- List of explorers
- List of Russian explorers
- European exploration of Arabia
- Timeline of European exploration
- Ancient Greece–Ancient India relations
