= Benedict of Poland =

Polish Franciscan friar and explorer (c. 1200 – c. 1280)

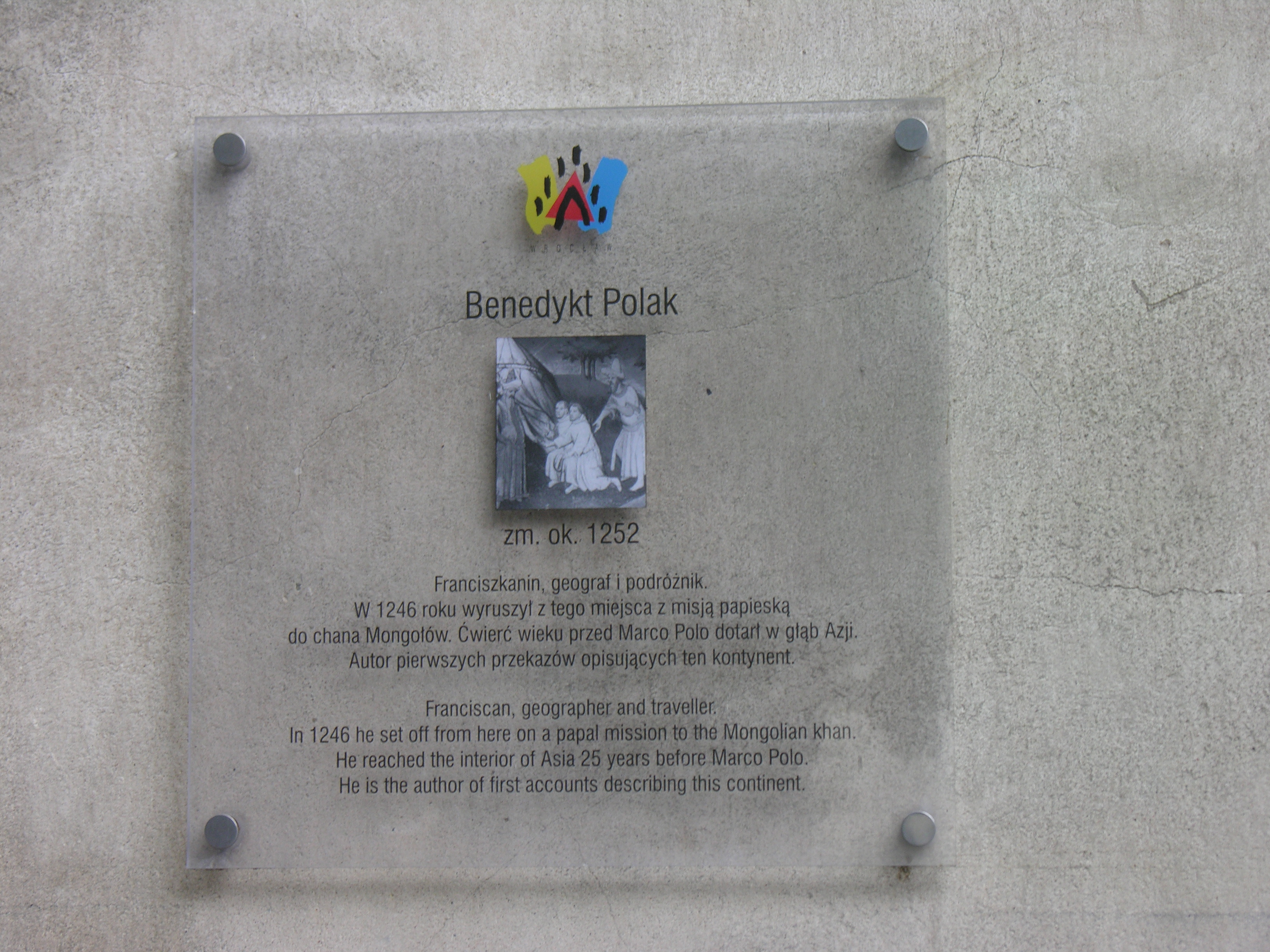
Commemorative plaque for Benedict of Poland in Wrocław

Benedict of Poland or Benedict the Pole (Latin: Benedictus Polonus; Polish: Benedykt Polak; c. 1200 – c. 1280) was a Polish Franciscan friar, traveler, explorer, and interpreter.

== Life ==
Benedict accompanied Giovanni da Pian del Carpine in his journey as delegate of Pope Innocent IV to Güyük Khan of the Mongol Empire in 1245–1247. He was probably the first Polish person to ever travel to China. Little is known about Benedict's life beyond the story of the journey.

He may have been taken prisoner during the Mongol invasion of Poland in 1241. He was well educated and spoke and wrote Latin, Polish, and Old Ruthenian. That he knew Old Ruthenian in particular implies he may have hailed from the east of Poland or that he spent time at the court of a duke with a Ruthenian wife. While Slavic languages were closer than they are today, fluency required regular practice. Benedict served as a secretary and was chosen to accompany Giovanni as an interpreter because of his knowledge of Russian and Polish; he may have even acquired some Mongolian as a prisoner.

Benedict was chosen for the journey due to Friar Stephen of Bohemia falling ill en route. Stephen was made to stay behind in the Mongol camp in Coman territory, because of his illness and the common practice to have members of foreign missions be hostages in Tatar territory. The objective of the journey was to obtain peace, convert the Mongols to Christianity, and spy on their military organization. On the journey, Benedict and Giovanni stayed in the camp of Batu Khan, the eldest son of Jochi and grandson to Chinggis.

Benedict was the author of the brief chronicle De itinere Fratrum Minorum ad Tartaros ('On the Journey of the Franciscan Friars to the Tatars'), not published until 1839 in France, and a year later in Poland, and the source for a longer work, Hystoria Tartarorum ('History of the Tatars'), discovered later and eventually published in 1965. The report of Benedict includes a copy of the letter of the Great Khan to the Pope. De Itinere Fratrum Minorum ad Tartaros is an account of the first expedition of Europeans to the capital of the Mongol Empire, which lasted from April 16, 1245 to November 18, 1247.

Along with Epistola de vita Tartarorum (1237) by Friar Julian, Ystoria Mongalorum (1245–1246) by Giovanni da Pian del Carpine, and Itinerarium ad partes orientales (1255) by William of Rubruck, his Relatio (1245–1246) is among the earliest Western European sources to contain significant information about Russia, all of which date to the mid-13th century. Benedict presents the Don and Volga as one river, possibly as a result of a misconception derived from Aristotle's account. He also provides a description of the Russian population during his time in Russia, as well as of the Russian princes who visited the khan's court.

Benedict made his accounts of the journey during and after their return in 1247. After returning from the voyage, he became guardian of the Franciscans at the Franciscan monastery in Kraków, where he spent the rest of his life. Later, he was also a witness at the canonization of Saint Stanislaus of Szczepanów in 1252.

== See also ==
- Chronology of European exploration of Asia
- List of foreign observers of Russia

== Sources ==
- Mund, Stéphane (April 2002). "Travel Accounts as Early Sources of Knowledge about Russia in Medieval Western Europe from the mid-Thirteenth to the early Fifteenth Centuries". The Medieval History Journal. 5 (1): 103–120. doi:10.1177/097194580200500105.
