= William of Rubruck =

Flemish missionary and explorer (fl. 1248–1257)

William of Rubruck or Rubrouck (Note: Early writers referred to him as Rysbroeck or Ruysbroek based on the mistaken identification of his name of origin with Ruysbroeck in Brabant) (fl. 1248–1257) was a Franciscan friar who, with the support of Louis IX of France, undertook a mission to the Great Khan Möngke of the Mongol Empire. On his return, William wrote his Itinerarium, an account addressed to King Louis, detailing his experiences and observations.

William was born likely in the 1210s or 1220s in Rubrouck in the County of Flanders of the Kingdom of France, and died, according to sources, in the 1270s or after 1293. He is known for his travels to various parts of the Middle East and Central Asia in the 13th century, including the Mongol Empire.

He traveled to Mongolia in 1253–1254, thus preceding the journeys of Marco Polo and Odoric of Pordenone. He visited Karakorum, the capital of the empire, and provided some descriptions of it. Upon his return, unable to meet the King of France in person, he wrote him a long letter in Latin recounting his journey through the Mongol Empire.

His account of his travels is one of the masterpieces of medieval travel literature, comparable to those of Marco Polo and Ibn Battuta, as well as an essential historical source. However, it never attained the popularity of Marco Polo's book.

== Mission ==
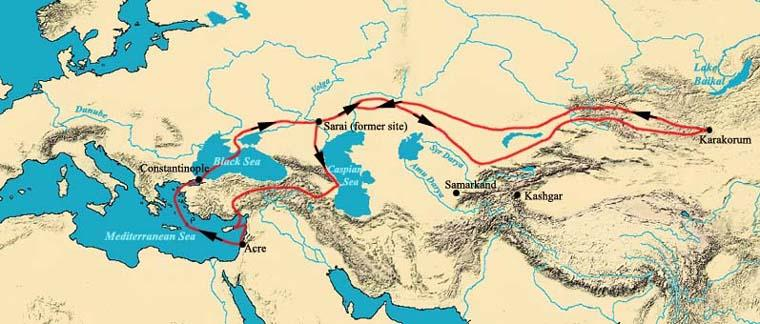
Voyage of William of Rubruck in 1253–1255

William was born in Rubrouck, County of Flanders, Kingdom of France. (Note: Now French Flanders in the Hauts-de-France région (Nord département) of France.) In 1248, he accompanied King Louis IX of France, on the Seventh Crusade. On 7 May 1253, on Louis' orders, he set out on a missionary journey to convert the Tatars to Christianity. He first stopped in Constantinople to confer with Baldwin of Hainaut, who had recently returned from a trip to Karakorum, the capital of the Mongol Empire, on behalf of Baldwin II, Latin Emperor. There, William received letters to some of the Tatar chiefs from the emperor.

William then followed the route of the first journey of the Hungarian Friar Julian, and in Asia that of the Italian Friar Giovanni da Pian del Carpine. With William's party were Bartolomeo da Cremona, an attendant called Gosset, and an interpreter named in William's report as Homo Dei, meaning "man of God", perhaps representing the Arabic Abdullah, "servant of God". William's was the fourth European mission to the Mongols: previous ones had been led by Giovanni da Pian del Carpine and Ascelin of Lombardia in 1245 and André de Longjumeau in 1249. The king had been encouraged to send another mission by reports of the presence of Nestorian Christians at the Mongolian court, but because of an earlier rebuff he declined to send a formal mission.

== Travels ==
After reaching the Crimean town of Sudak, William continued his trek with oxen and carts. Nine days after crossing the Don, he met Sartaq Khan, next ruler of the Kipchak Khanate. The Khan sent William on to his father, Batu Khan, at Sarai near the Volga River. Five weeks later, after the departure from Sudak, he reached the encampment of Batu Khan, Mongol ruler of the Kipchak Khanate and Volga River region. William is said to have taken an aggressive approach with Batu, promising him eternal damnation and everlasting fire should he not convert. Batu was offended by William's preaching and reportedly saw it as a threat. Batu refused conversion but sent the ambassadors on to the Great Khan of the Mongols, Möngke Khan.

William and his traveling companions set off on horseback on 16 September 1253 on a 9,000-kilometre (5,600 mi) journey to the court of the Great Khan at Karakorum in modern-day Mongolia. Arriving in late December they were received courteously, and he was given an audience on 4 January 1254. William's account provided an extensive description of the city's walls, markets, and temples, and the separate quarters for Muslim and Chinese craftsmen among a surprisingly cosmopolitan population. He also visited the court of the Vastacius (Empire of Nicaea) during the feast day of Felicitas and met Nicaean envoys during his travels. Among the Europeans he encountered were the nephew of an English bishop, a woman from Lorraine who cooked William's Easter dinner, and Guillaume Boucher, a French silversmith who was making ornaments for the Khan's women and altars for the Nestorian Christians. William is highly critical of Nestorians in his accounts, believing them to be heretical.

William's party stayed at the Khan's camp until 10 July 1254, when they began their long journey back home. After spending two weeks in late September with Batu Khan, and Christmas at Nakhchivan in present-day Azerbaijan, he and his companions reached the County of Tripoli on 15 August 1255.

== Account ==
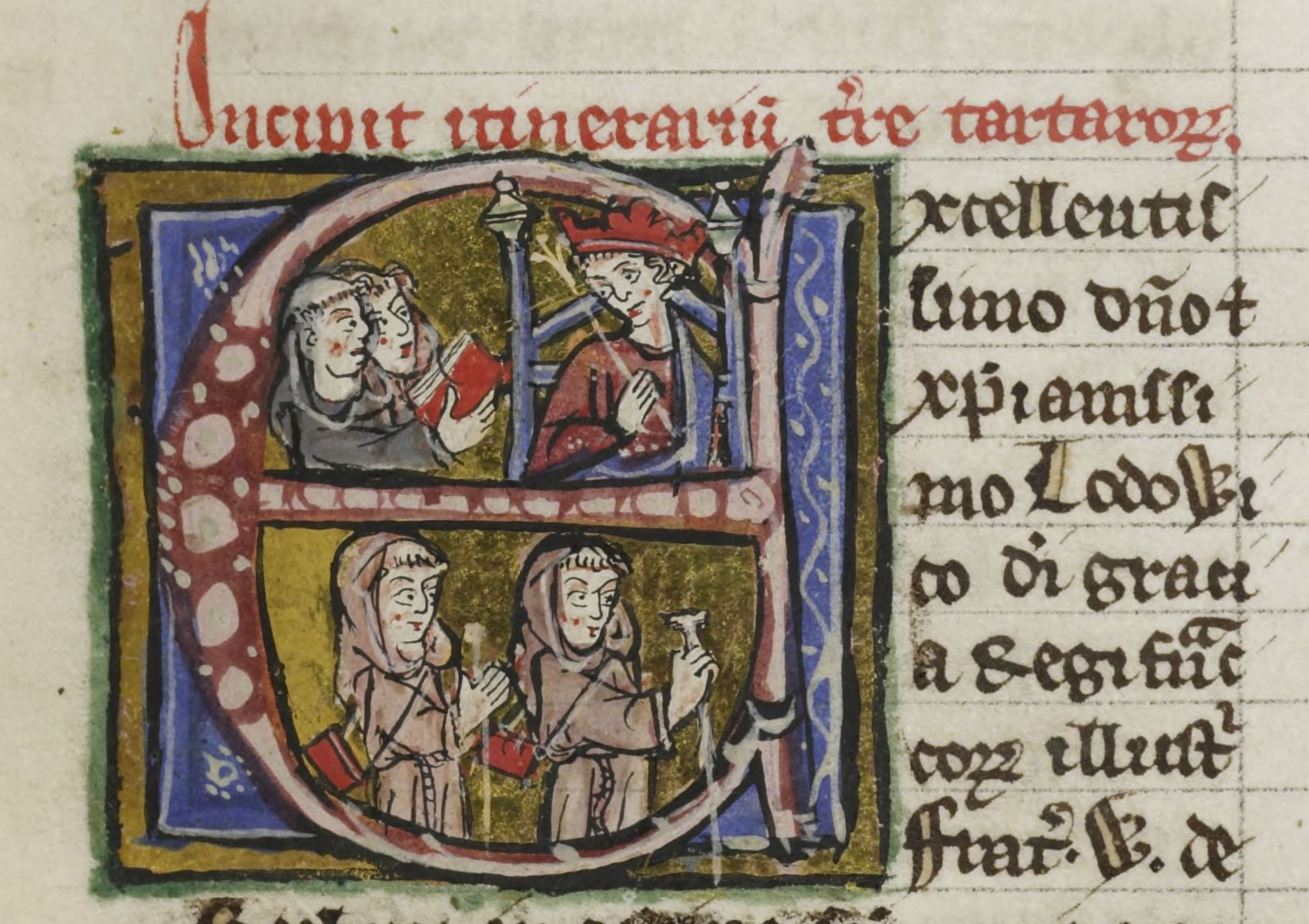
An initial from a 14th-century copy of the manuscript. The upper portion shows William of Rubruck and his travelling companion receiving a commission from Louis IX of France. The lower portion shows the two friars on their journey.

On his return, William presented to King Louis IX a very clear and precise report, entitled Itinerarium fratris Willielmi de Rubruquis de ordine fratrum Minorum, Galli, Anno gratiae 1253 ad partes Orientales. William's report is divided into 40 chapters. Chapters 1–10 relate general observations about the Mongols and their customs, while chapters 11–40 give an account of the course and the events of William's voyage. He showed a great facility with language, noting the similarities between those he encountered and those European languages he already knew.

In the report, he described the peculiarities of the Mongol Empire as well as many geographical observations. There were also anthropological observations, such as his surprise at the presence of Islam in Inner Asia. William was critical of the Hellenic traditions he encountered among the Christians of the former Byzantine Empire, including the Nicaean celebration of a feast day for Felicitas, which he reports was known to John III Doukas Vatatzes through the alleged possession of the second half of Ovid's incomplete Book of Days.

During his journey through what is now southern Kazakhstan, William recorded information about slaves of German origin in the city of Talas. They were initially under the control of prince Buri, but William later learned that Möngke Khan had transferred them to a settlement called Bolat. During his conversation with Möngke, William even expressed his desire to return to the Mongol Empire as a priest to the Christian captive.

William also answered a long-standing question in demonstrating by his passage north of the Caspian Sea that it was an inland sea and did not flow into the Arctic Ocean; although earlier Scandinavian explorers like Ingvar the Far-Travelled had extensive knowledge of the region, William was the first to answer the question in written form.

In May 1254, during his stay among the Mongols, William entered into a famous competition at the Mongol court, as the khan encouraged a formal theological debate between the Christians, Buddhists, and Muslims, in order to determine which faith was correct, as determined by three judges, one from each faith. A Chinese person participated with William in the competition.

Roger Bacon, William's contemporary and fellow-Franciscan, cited the traveler copiously in his Opus Majus, and described him as "Brother William through whom the lord King of France sent a message to the Tartars in 1253 AD ... who traveled to regions in the east and north and attached himself to the midst of these places, and wrote of the above to the illustrious king; which book I carefully read and with his permission expounded on". (Note: frater Wilhelmus quem dominus rex Franciae misit ad Tartaros, Anno Domini 1253 ... qui perlustravit regiones orientis et aquilonis et loca in medio his annexa, et scripsit haec praedicta illustri regi; quem librum diligenter vidi et cum ejus auctore contuli.) After Bacon, however, William's narrative seems to have dropped out of sight until Richard Hakluyt's 1599 publication.

Along with Epistola de vita Tartarorum (1237) by Friar Julian, Relatio (1245–1246) by Benedict of Poland, and Ystoria Mongalorum (1245–1246) by Giovanni da Pian del Carpine, it is among the earliest Western European sources to contain significant information about Russia, all of which date to the mid-13th century. Like Marco Polo, William never actually visited Russia, although he encountered Russians during his travels and stay at the khan's court. He describes Russia as a northern country: "To the north of this province [i.e. Cumania] lies Russia, which [...] extends from Poland and Hungary to the Tanais [i.e. Don] [...] Beyond Russia to the north is Prussia, which has all been recently conquered by the Teutonic knights. William also provides a description of Russian merchants: "...and thither [i.e., Sudak] come all the merchants arriving from Turkey who wish to go to the northern countries, and likewise those coming from Russia and the northern countries who wish to pass into Turkey. The latter carry vair and miniver, and other costly furs; the others (the former) carry cloths of cotton or bombax, silk stuffs and sweet-smelling spices." He also describes the importance of fur in the Russian economy: "The ordinary money of Russians are skins of vair and miniver."

== Editions ==
The Latin text of an incomplete manuscript containing only the first 26 chapters, together with an English translation by Richard Hakluyt, was published in 1599. A critical edition of the complete Latin text prepared by the French historian Francisque Michel and the English antiquarian Thomas Wright was published in 1839. An English translation by William Woodville Rockhill, The Journey of William of Rubruk to the Eastern Parts, was published by the Hakluyt Society in 1900, and an updated translation by Peter Jackson in 1990. Jackson's translation is based on the critical edition by Anastasius Van den Wyngaert that was published in 1929.

== List of manuscripts ==
	Manuscript (Note: Details of manuscripts A to D from Jackson and Morgan 1990.)	Date	Notes
A	Corpus Christi, Cambridge, MS 181, pp. 321–398	Last quarter of the 13th century	Oldest and the basis of Van den Wyngaert's 1929 critical edition.
B	Corpus Christi, Cambridge, MS 66A, ff. 67r–110r	First third of 14th century	Contains a historiated initial at the beginning of the text and includes some chapter titles in the margins.
C	Corpus Christi, Cambridge, MS 407, ff. 37r–66r	Beginning of 15th century	Ends after Chapter 26 paragraph 8.
D	British Library, MS Royal 14 C XIII ff. 255r–236r	15th century	Ends after Chapter 26 paragraph 8. Used by Richard Hakluyt for his 1599 translation.
E	Yale University Library, New Haven, Beinecke MS 406 ff. 93r–142v	15th century	

== Legacy ==
Russian poet Nikolay Zabolotskiy wrote in 1958 the long poem "Rubruck in Mongolia" (Russian: Рубрук в Монголии).

== See also ==
- Chronology of European exploration of Asia
- List of foreign observers of Russia
- Michał Boym

== Sources ==
- Grousset, René (1970). The Empire of the Steppes. Translated by Naomi Walford. New Brunswick: Rutgers University Press. ISBN 978-0-8135-1304-1.
- Hakluyt, Richard (1599). "The iournal of frier William de Rubruquis a French man of the order of minorite friers, unto the east parts of the worlde A. Dom. 1253". The Principal Navigations Voyages Traffiques and Discoveries of the English Nation (in English and Latin). Vol. 1. London: George Bishop, Ralph Newberie, and Robert Baker. pp. 71–92 Latin text, 93–117 English translation. Based on British Library MS Royal 14.C.XIII Fol. 225r-236r and thus ends prematurely.
- Jackson, Peter; Morgan, David (1990). The Mission of Friar William of Rubruck: His Journey to the Court of the Great Khan Möngke, 1253-1255. London: Hakluyt Society. ISBN 978-090418029-9.
- Michel, Francisque; Wright, Thomas (1839). "Voyage en Orient du Frère Guillaume de Rubruk". In d'Avezac-Macaya, M.A.P. (ed.). Recueil de Voyages et de Mémoires (in French and Latin). Vol. 4. Paris: Société de Geographie. pp. 205–396. A critical edition of the Latin text on pp. 213–396.
- Mund, Stéphane (April 2002). "Travel Accounts as Early Sources of Knowledge about Russia in Medieval Western Europe from the mid-Thirteenth to the early Fifteenth Centuries". The Medieval History Journal. 5 (1): 103–120. doi:10.1177/097194580200500105.
- Rockhill, William Woodville (1900). The Journey of William of Rubruck to the Eastern Parts of the World, 1253-55. London: Hayklut Society.
- Van den Wyngaert, Anastasius (1929). "Itinerarium Willelmi de Rubruc". Sinica franciscana (in Latin). Vol. I: Itinera et relationes Fratrum Minorum saeculi XIII et XIV. Florence: Claras Aquas. pp. 164–332. OCLC 215235814.
- This article incorporates text from a publication now in the public domain: Yule, Henry; Beazley, Charles Raymond (1911). "Rubruquis, William of". In Chisholm, Hugh (ed.). Encyclopædia Britannica. Vol. 23 (11th ed.). Cambridge University Press. pp. 810–812.
