= Peter Petreius =

Swedish writer and diplomat (1570–1622)

Peer Peersson of Erlesunda, also known as Per Erlesund and by his Latinized pen name Peter Petreius (1570 – October 28, 1622) was a Swedish diplomat, envoy to Muscovy and author of the History of the Grand Duchy of Muscovy (1615) that attempted to present a complete history of Russia from the foundation of Kievan Rus to the end of the Time of Troubles.

== Biography ==
Peer Peersson was born in Uppsala, into the family of a priest at Uppsala Cathedral; his father, Per-Benedict Persson, later became the Bishop of Västerås and Linköping. Per Persson junior graduated from the King Johann School and joined the Magdeburg University. After a short period of dedicated studies Peersson slipped into a lifestyle of a rake, indulging in drinking and duels; in 1593 he was expelled from the university and ended up in jail for debts. He managed to return to Sweden and joined the office of Duke Charles, King Sigismund's uncle, who ascended to the throne in 1604 as Charles IX of Sweden.

In 1601 Peersson left Sweden for a four-year reconnaissance tour of Muscovy in the guise of a doctor. His dispatches to the court were reproduced by Jacques Auguste de Thou in his Historiarum sui temporis. Back in Sweden, Peersson compiled his dispatches into a Fair and true relation on recent Russian past from Ivan Grozny to the ascension of Vasily Shuysky. The book was based exclusively on Peersson's own experience and on the oral narratives by contemporary Russians (Vasily Shuysky, Maria Nagaya and the retinue of False Dmitriy I) and Western witnesses (Caspar Fiedler, Conrad Bussow). Peersson in real life tracked Bussow's activity with suspicion and recovered evidence of Bussow's treason that resulted in the defection of Swedish garrison in Narva (his allegations are contested by modern authors, e.g. Orchard). Persson obtained the manuscript of Bussow's The Disturbed State of the Russian Realm (the first, 1614, version) and reused it in his own later works. Historians of the first half of 19th century incorrectly considered Peersson the primary source for Bussow's book until Arist Kunik (1849) and Sergey Solovyov (1858) restored Bussow in his own rights.

In 1607–1608 Peersson returned to Moscow as the king's envoy, seeking a military alliance between Sweden and Muscovy. When the treaty was signed, Peersson joined the Swedish corps of Jacob De la Gardie that was hired by tsar Vasily; he left Russia upon the completion of De la Gardie Campaign and returned in 1612, to Novgorod. In 1615 he was spotted in Denmark and Poland, collecting intelligence for the upcoming War of 1617–1618. In the same year he published his opus magnum, the History of the Grand Duchy of Moscow. In 1617 Persson was involved in signing the Treaty of Stolbovo which was incorporated in the 1620 German edition of the History. His death in Stockholm was, presumably, caused by plague.

== Critical assessment ==
Modern Russian historians agree that the facts that occurred during Peersson's stay in Moscow were, generally, retold reliably although sometimes exaggerated (e. g. scenes of cannibalism on the streets of Moscow presented as eyewitness report). Peersson-Petreius was confident that Tsarevich Dimitri was indeed killed in Uglich in 1591; like Isaac Massa, he condemned Boris Godunov for arranging the murder, yet Persson's story contains an unrealistic scene of an arson in Uglich and Moscow, set up simultaneously to cover up the crime. False Dmitriy I, according to Peersson, was indeed Grigory Otrepyev. Peersson's understanding of the general sequence of the Time of Troubles and their causes is very close to modern mainstream theory, but his description of contemporary events outside his own and his direct sources' reach is regarded as only partially credible. Even the late 18th – early 19th century fiction authors criticized Peersonn for indiscriminate retelling of anecdotes of the Vegetable Lamb sort and his apparent pro-Swedish bias: "...should we even allow that Petreius was not influenced in his judgement by the politics of his own court, yet, as an author, he is liable to great exception: for the numberless fictions and gross misrepresentations which he retails in his Chronicle, prove extreme proneness to credulity." His retelling of Kievan Rus chronicles, acquired through oral narrative, is loaded with extreme normanist attitude, and not reliable at all.

Peersson's account of social life in Russia, Eastern Orthodoxy, popular culture and traditions was harsh and unforgiving. It is nevertheless corroborated by independent, equally unforgiving memoirs by Giles Fletcher, the Elder (1591) and Samuel Collins (1671) and is representative of the Protestant view of contemporary Muscovy.

== Sources ==
- "Патерсон, Петр" . Brockhaus and Efron Encyclopedic Dictionary (in Russian). 1906.
