= Conrad Bussow =

German writer and mercenary (died 1617)

Conrad Bussow (1552 or 1553, Ilten or Hanover – 1617) was a German mercenary from Lower Saxony who lived in Riga in the 1590s and in Muscovy in 1600–1611. In 1614–1617 Bussow compiled The Disturbed State of the Russian Realm, an eye-witness history of the Time of Troubles. An early manuscript of his book was plagiarized by Peter Petreius in his History of the Grand Duchy of Muscovy.

== Biography ==
Conrad Bussow was born in the township of Ilten (part of present-day Sehnde near Hanover), in a family of a Lutheran pastor; his writing as a mature man suggests that he received a decent education at home, especially in Latin language and literature. He joined the military at the age of sixteen or seventeen. Details of his early service are unknown, but he eventually appeared in the troops of Stephen Báthory of Poland, engaged in the Livonian War. When Russia was forced out of this conflict, the Polish-Swedish coalition fell apart; Bussow changed sides and joined the Swedish service. In 1590s he lived in Riga; little is known of his family life except that two of his sons born in this period reached mature age and were alive in 1610s. His exact position in Swedish forces remains unclear; Bussow names himself Inspector and Intendant of the lands conquered in Livonia by Duke Karl of Södermanland.

Swedish hold of Livonia eroded in late 1590s, the Poles were preparing to take it over and in 1599 Bussow changed sides again, deserting the weakened Swedish force for Muscovy. According to the version of Bussow' nemesis, Swedish envoy Peter Petreius, in 1599 agents of Boris Godunov recruited Bussow in Narva; Bussow agreed to hand the city over to Russians and secure neutrality of the German troops in his command. The plot was discovered and Bussow fled to Muscovy.

Bussow's treason was rewarded with lands in Russia and a small, unimportant military command. His subsequent service to Godunov, False Dmitriy I and Vasily Shuysky was unremarkable; Bussow stayed away from the political conflicts. In 1606 he somehow dissatisfied tsar Vasily Shuysky who relieved Bussow of his command and ordered him to retire in his Kaluga estate. There, he was caught in the middle of Ivan Bolotnikov's revolt. Bussow's son, also Conrad Bussow, joined the revolt; he was later caught, sentenced to exile in Siberia but returned safely after the fall of Shuysky. Bussow (senior) followed Bolotnikov's troops but did not engage in any decisive combat. Later, he would likewise follow the camps of Jan Piotr Sapieha and False Dmitry II. In 1611 Bussow realized that the Poles ultimately lost their war in Muscovy; he retired to Polish-occupied Riga and settled on writing a book of memoirs on the Time of Troubles. Perhaps he was motivated by the financial success of a book published by Jacques Margeret, a fellow mercenary in Muscovite service.

Bussow prepared two versions of his book. The first, compiled with the help of his son-in-law Martin Beer, was sent in 1613 to Frederick Ulrich, Duke of Brunswick-Lüneburg, master of the Wolfenbüttel Library. The Duke did not reply, either due to his internal problems, or due to Bussow's strained reputation as a deserter. This book never found its way to a printing press. Peter Petreius, the man who made Bussow's desertion a common knowledge among European courts, obtained a copy of the manuscript and reused or plagiarized its content in his own book issued in Swedish in 1615 and in German in 1620. The second manuscript, written by Bussow alone, was ready for publication in 1617. Bussow made a deal with a printer in Lübeck shortly before his death and the publication was cancelled. Petreius could now proceed with his plagiarism without remorse.

== Critical assessment ==
Although the manuscripts were not printed in the 17th century, their placement in the Wolfenbüttel Library made them accessible to scholars. In 1690s Christian Kelch used both Bussow and Petreius as independent sources. In the first half of 19th century the relationship between Martin Beer, Conrad Bussow and Peter Petreius was not clearly understood; German and Russian scholars (notably Friedrich von Adelung, Nikolay Karamzin, Nikolai Rumyantsev) considered Beer, not Bussow, to be the primary author. Bussow was restored in his own right in 1849 by Arist Kunik and in 1858 by Sergey Solovyov.

Bussow's German text now exists in different manuscript copies, of which Wolfenbüttel II is probably the most authentic; the complete English translation (printed 1994) was based on 1961 Smirnov edition with cross-checking against the manuscripts.

Bussow as an author is remarkable in two aspects. On the upside, he "seems to have had all the instincts of an investigative reporter. He always seemed to be where the action was." He personally knew the driving leaders of most of warring factions and was personally present at the crucial events of the war. Knowing spoken Russian well, Bussow could retell his Russian sources directly, without resorting to interpreters.

At the same time, "it is amazing that someone could live for ten years in a country without acquiring the slightest insight into, or empathy to, the local culture." Bussow was as ignorant in matters of Orthodox Christianity and popular culture as he was competent in military tactics. However, the numbers provided in his generally credible descriptions of military actions are regarded as exaggerated.
