= Giovanni da Pian del Carpine =

Italian diplomat and archbishop (c. 1185 – 1252)

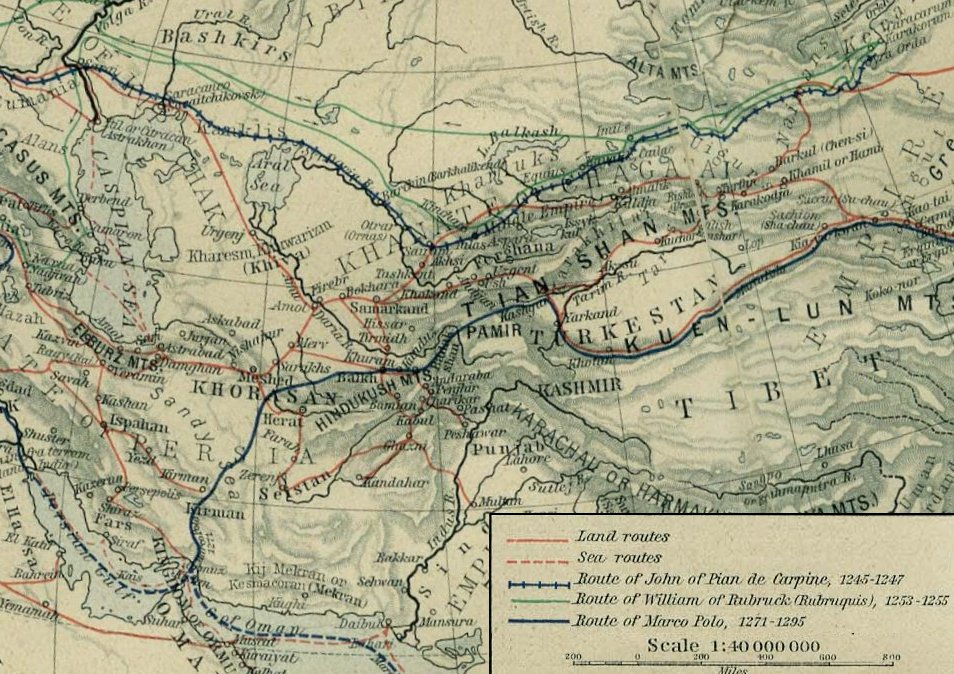
Carpine's great journey to the East; his route is indicated, railroad track style, in dark blue

Giovanni da Pian del Carpine OFM (or Carpini; Latin: Iohannes de Plano Carpini, anglicised as John of Plano Carpini; c. 1185 – 1 August 1252) was a medieval Italian diplomat, Catholic archbishop, explorer and one of the first Europeans to enter the court of the Great Khan of the Mongol Empire. He was the author of the earliest important Western account of North and Central Asia, Eastern Europe, and other regions of the Mongol dominion. He served as the Primate of Serbia, based in Antivari, from 1247 to 1252.

== Life before the journey ==
Giovanni appears to have been a native of Umbria, in central Italy. His surname was derived from Pian del Carpine (literally "Hornbeam Plain"), an area known later as Magione, between Perugia and Cortona. He was one of the companions and disciples of his near-contemporary and countryman Saint Francis of Assisi.

Highly esteemed within the Franciscan order, Giovanni had a prominent role in the propagation of its teachings in northern Europe, holding in succession the offices of warden (custos) in Saxony and provincial (minister) of Germany. He may also have held positions in Barbary and Cologne, and been provincial of Spain.

== Background to his travels ==
Giovanni was a provincial of Germany at the time of the great Mongol invasions of Eastern Europe and the Battle of Legnica (modern Legnickie Pole) on 9 April 1241. The defeat of European forces at Legnica almost led to Ögedei, Khan of the Mongol Empire, controlling most of Eastern Europe.

In Europe, dread of the "Tatars" (Mongols) was still widespread four years later, when Pope Innocent IV decided to dispatch the first formal Catholic mission to the Mongols. The missionaries were sent partly in protest at the Mongol invasion of Christendom and partly to gain information regarding the Khan's intentions and military strength.

Franciscans such as Giovanni served as envoys and took notes on their missions and the events which occurred as they traveled. Giovanni was sent along with Friar Benedict of Poland to the Mongol Empire. Language barriers were one of the issues envoys came across whilst traveling across the Silk Road, so Giovanni's fluency in Latin and French, and Benedict's fluency in Polish and Russian, would assist them on their mission.

== Travels ==
Pope Innocent IV chose Giovanni to head the mission and apparently he was in charge of nearly everything in the mission. As a papal legate, he bore a letter from the Pope to the Great Khan, Cum non solum. "At the age of sixty-three Carpini embarked from Lyon," where the Pope then resided, on Easter day (16 April 1245), accompanied by another friar, Stephen of Bohemia, who broke down at Kaniv near Kiev and was left behind. After seeking counsel of an old friend, Wenceslaus, king of Bohemia, Giovanni was joined at Wrocław by another Franciscan, Benedict of Poland, who was appointed to act as interpreter.

The route passed by Kiev, entered the Tatar posts at Kaniv and then ran across the Nepere to the Don and Volga. Giovanni is the first Westerner to give the modern names for those rivers. He reported the presence of Saracens in southwestern Russia who drafted people into service and took a census of those who remained. While in Russia, he also mentioned that the Mongol tithe collector demanded one boy out of every three from each Russian family, and also took unmarried men and women, as well as the poor. On the Volga stood the ordu, or camp, of Batu, the famous conqueror of Eastern Europe and supreme Mongol commander on the western frontiers of the empire. He was one of the most senior princes of the house of Genghis Khan. There, the envoys, with their presents, had to pass between two fires to remove possible injurious thoughts and poisons, before being presented to the prince (early April 1246).

Batu ordered them to proceed to the court of the supreme Khan in Mongolia. On Easter day once more (8 April 1246), they started on the second and most formidable part of their journey. They were "so ill", wrote the legate, "that we could scarcely sit a horse; and throughout all that Lent our food had been nought but millet with salt and water, and with only snow melted in a kettle for drink". Their bodies were tightly bandaged so that they could endure the excessive fatigue of the enormous ride, which took them across the Jaec, or Ural River and north of the Caspian Sea and the Aral to the Jaxartes or Syr Darya (quidam fluvius magnus cujus nomen ignoramus, "a big river whose name we do not know") and the Muslim cities that stood on its banks. Then they went along the shores of the lakes of Dzungaria until, on the feast of St Mary Magdalene (22 July), they reached the imperial camp called Sira Orda (Yellow Pavilion), near Karakorum and the Orkhon River. Giovanni and his companions rode an estimated 3,000 miles in 106 days.

Since the death of Ögedei Khan, the imperial authority was in interregnum and Güyük, Ögedei's eldest son, was designated to the throne. His formal election in a great Kurultai, or diet of the tribes, took place while the friars were at Sira Orda, which entailed the gathering of 3,000 to 4,000 envoys and deputies from all parts of Asia and eastern Europe, bearing homage, tribute and presents. On 24 August, they witnessed the formal enthronement at another camp in the vicinity called the Golden Ordu, and they were then presented to the new emperor.

The great Khan, Güyük, refused the invitation to become Christian and demanded rather that the Pope and rulers of Europe should come to him and swear allegiance to him, a demand recorded in a letter from Güyük Khan to Pope Innocent IV. The Khan did not dismiss the expedition until November. He gave them a letter to the Pope written in Mongol and copied into Persian and Latin that was a brief imperious assertion of the Khan's office as the scourge of God. They began a long winter journey home. Often, they had to lie on the bare snow or on ground scraped bare of snow with a foot. They reached Kiev on 10 June 1247. There and on their further journey, the Slavonic Christians welcomed them as risen from the dead with festive hospitality. Crossing the Rhine at Cologne, they found the Pope still at Lyon and delivered their report and the Khan's letter.

Not long afterward, Giovanni was rewarded with the archbishopric of Primate of Serbia in Antivari in Dalmatia, and was sent as legate to Louis IX of France. He lived only five years following the hardships of his journey. He died, according to the Franciscan Martyrology and other authorities, on 1 August 1252.

== Books ==
The Ystoria Mongalorum is the report compiled by Carpine, of his trip to the Mongol Empire. Written in the 1240s, it is the oldest European account of the Mongols. Carpine was the first European to try to chronicle Mongol history. Two versions of the Ystoria Mongalorum are known to exist: Carpine's own and another, usually referred to as the Tartar Relation.

An English translation of Giovanni's book title is History of the Mongols, which serves as a report of the travels of Giovanni and the friars to the Mongol Empire. In his book, Giovanni includes a prologue as well as several chapters which cover specific topics including religious practices, culture, and combat methods. The Europeans generally held a poor viewpoint of the Mongols in the 13th century, when Giovanni wrote his book, and this is evident in the book's inclusion of both positive and negative descriptions of the Mongols that Giovanni and his men encountered.

Erik Hildinger translated Giovanni's book into English.

Along with Epistola de vita Tartarorum (1237) by Friar Julian, Relatio (1245–1246) by Benedict of Poland, and Itinerarium ad partes orientales (1255) by William of Rubruck, it is among the earliest Western European sources to contain significant information about Russia, all of which date to the mid-13th century. Carpine's account accurately assesses the importance of fur in the economy of medieval Russia and is therefore still used as a source of information by modern historians.

== See also ==
- Chronology of European exploration of Asia
- Dzungarian Gate
- List of foreign observers of Russia

== Sources ==
- "Карпини, Иоаннес де Плано" . Brockhaus and Efron Encyclopedic Dictionary (in Russian). 1906.
- Favereau, Marie (20 April 2021). The Horde: How the Mongols Changed the World. Harvard University Press. ISBN 978-0-674-24421-4.
- Martin, Janet L. B. (7 June 2004). Treasure of the Land of Darkness: The Fur Trade and Its Significance for Medieval Russia. Cambridge University Press. pp. 87–88. ISBN 978-0-521-54811-3.
- Mund, Stéphane (April 2002). "Travel Accounts as Early Sources of Knowledge about Russia in Medieval Western Europe from the mid-Thirteenth to the early Fifteenth Centuries". The Medieval History Journal. 5 (1): 103–120. doi:10.1177/097194580200500105.
- Ostrowski, Donald (1993). "Why did the Metropolitan Move from Kiev to Vladimir in the Thirteenth Century". Christianity and the Eastern Slavs. Volume I: Slavic Cultures in the Middle Ages. Berkeley: University of California Press. pp. 83–101. ISBN 9780520360198. doi:10.1525/9780520313606-009
- Rachewiltz, Igor de (1971). Papal envoys to the great khans. Stanford University Press.
- Живковић, Војислав (2024). Барска архиепископија под српском влашћу у средњем веку (докторска дисертација)(The Archbishopic of Bar under Serbian rule in the Middle Ages). Нови Сад: Филозофски факултет.
