= Samuel Collins (physician, born 1619) =

British doctor and author

Samuel Collins (1619 – 26 October 1670; Samuel Collins I in Russian bibliography, see disambiguation) was an English medical doctor and writer. Collins was a personal physician to Alexis I of Russia in 1659–1666 and the author of The Present State of Russia printed in London in 1671.

== Biography ==
Born to a vicar in Braintree, Samuel Collins entered Corpus Christi College, Cambridge in 1635, but for some reason took no degree at the university. Presumably, he a pursued medical career in Padua where he graduated M.D; in 1659 his diploma was recognized by Oxford University. In 1659 or 1660 Collins was approached by John Hedben, one of several men in Russian employ assigned the task of recruiting skilled Europeans for service at the court of Tsar Aleksei Mikhailovich. Collins accepted the proposal and shortly moved to Moscow. He remained in the capital for nine years as personal physician to Tsar Aleksei. Collins practiced such remedies as Deer horns, Moose hoofs and Hare hair (Latin: Cor.cervi, ungul.Al., pil. Lepor), apparently with success. Collins resigned from Russian service 28 June 1666 with honours and a generous pay and immediately left for England. There he compiled his notes on life in Muscovy into The Present State of Russia, in a Letter to a Friend in London. Collins declared that he deliberately had not used any written sources, pretending that no man of his intelligence and capabilities has ever traveled to Moscow. Modern analysis corroborated this claim.

The first English edition of The Present State of Russia was released in 1667 and reissued in 1668, 1671 and 1698. Collins, according to a cenotaph in Braintree, died "taking a journey into France" on 26 October 1670 in Paris. The French edition was printed anonymously in 1679; the German translation in 1929. The first Russian edition, translated by Pyotr Kireyevsky from a French print, was published in 1828 (excerpts) and 1841 (complete text); in 1846 Kireyevsky published a translation of an English original. The book was regularly reprinted since.

== Critical assessment ==
The book contains 26 chapters, arranged without a particular plan. As a doctor, Collins paid particular attention to local climate, nature and food habits. His account of Russian life outside of Moscow is, however, grossly incorrect: for example, he described contemporary Ukrainians as "Circassians sic, a people of Tartarian race". On the other hand, he rebutted the legendary Vegetable Lamb cryptid that found its place in Peter Petreius book.

Like contemporary Western authors, Collins indiscriminately filled the book with unreliable anecdotes. Some of these stories can be traced to common European tales; others, based on a game of Russian words, give away his knowledge of vernacular spoken Russian. Collins, apart from retelling anecdotes, provided unique information not available in other Western sources:

- about the minister Afanasy Ordin-Nashchokin
- about commercial rivalry between the Dutch and English traders in Muscovy (by the 1660s the Dutch were clearly winning)
- and about the tsar himself.

19th century Russian critics catalogued Collins under the russophobe variety of Western reporters, along with Giles Fletcher, the Elder and Peter Petreius. His unforgiving account of muscovite ethics, morality and religion is fully in line with these and other Western reports; modern analysis regards this aspect of his book as generally correct from the Protestant viewpoint of that period. His own morality is evident from the passages related to crimes and punishment:

- Collins approved execution of money forgers by pouring molten tin in their mouths, citing a Latin phrase with a meaning of "a fair law cures the crime with its own weapons"
- Likewise, Collins approved execution of wives who killed their husbands through burying them alive, because "a wife who could not even love her husband truly deserved death".

== Disambiguation ==
Life of Samuel Collins I overlapped with the lives of two other physicians also named Samuel Collins:

- Samuel Collins (physician, born 1618) (1618–1710), M.D. (Cambridge), a personal physician to Charles II of England and author of A System of Anatomy
- Samuel Collins (physician, born 1617) (1617–1685), M.D. (Oxford), scholar and registrar at Oxford University

Father of Samuel Collins I, the vicar of Braintree, was also named Samuel. Ambiguous events in this biography were interpreted as in C. H. & Thomson Cooper 1860 article.

== Sources ==
- "Коллинз, Сэмюэл" . Brockhaus and Efron Encyclopedic Dictionary (in Russian). 1906.
