= George D. Painter =

English writer (1914–2005)

George D. Painter OBE
- Born: George Duncan Painter; 5 June 1914; Birmingham, England
- Died: 8 December 2005 (aged 91); England
- Education: Trinity College, Cambridge
- Occupation: Writer
- Notable work: Marcel Proust: A Biography
- Awards: Duff Cooper Prize; James Tait Black Memorial Prize

George Duncan Painter OBE (5 June 1914 – 8 December 2005), known as George D. Painter, was an English author most famous as a biographer of Marcel Proust.

== Career ==
Painter was born in Birmingham, England. His father was a schoolmaster, and his mother was an artist. He studied classics at Trinity College, Cambridge, and later lectured in Latin at the University of Liverpool for one year. From 1938 until World War II and again after the war, he took a position as deputy curator of the British Museum's incunabula department.

His two-volume biography of Proust was published in 1959 and 1965. According to Miron Grindea, this was "rightly greeted as one of the great achievements in literary history", and it is still widely considered to be one of the finest literary biographies in the English language. Its second volume won the Duff Cooper Prize. His later work Chateaubriand: Volume 1 – The Longed-For Tempests was awarded the 1977 James Tait Black Memorial Prize.

== In popular culture ==
- His poem "The Lobster" was adapted into a song by the English folk-rock band Fairport Convention, on their self-titled debut album, released in 1968.

== Bibliography ==
- 1951: André Gide: A Critical and Biographical Study London: Arthur Barker
  - Revised and enlarged. London: Weidenfeld & Nicolson (1968)
  - Translations into French (1968) and Italian (1969)
- 1951: The Road to Sinodun: A Winter and Summer Monodrama (poems) London: Rupert Hart-Davis
- 1953: André Gide: Marshlands and Prometheus Misbound: two satires. London: Secker & Warburg (translation)
- 1956: Marcel Proust: Letters to His Mother (translation) London: Rider
- 1959: Marcel Proust: A Biography. Volume 1. London: Chatto & Windus, ISBN 0701110007
- 1965: Marcel Proust: A Biography. Volume 2. London: Chatto & Windus
  - Translations into German (1962 & 1968), Italian (1965), French (1966), Spanish (1967), and Polish (1972)
- 1965: The Vinland Map and the Tartar Relation (with R. A. Skelton and Thomas E. Marston). New Haven: Yale University Press. Painter contributed: The Tartar Relation, edited, with introduction, translation and commentary; The Tartar Relation and the Vinland Map: an interpretation (new edition New Haven: Yale University Press, 1995. ISBN 0300065205)
- 1976: William Caxton: A Quincentenary Biography of England's First Printer. London: Chatto & Windus, ISBN 070112198X
- 1977: Chateaubriand: A Biography. Volume 1, 1768–93, The Longed-For Tempests. London: Chatto & Windus, ISBN 0394426584
