= Jacques Margeret =

French mercenary officer (c. 1565 – c. 1619)

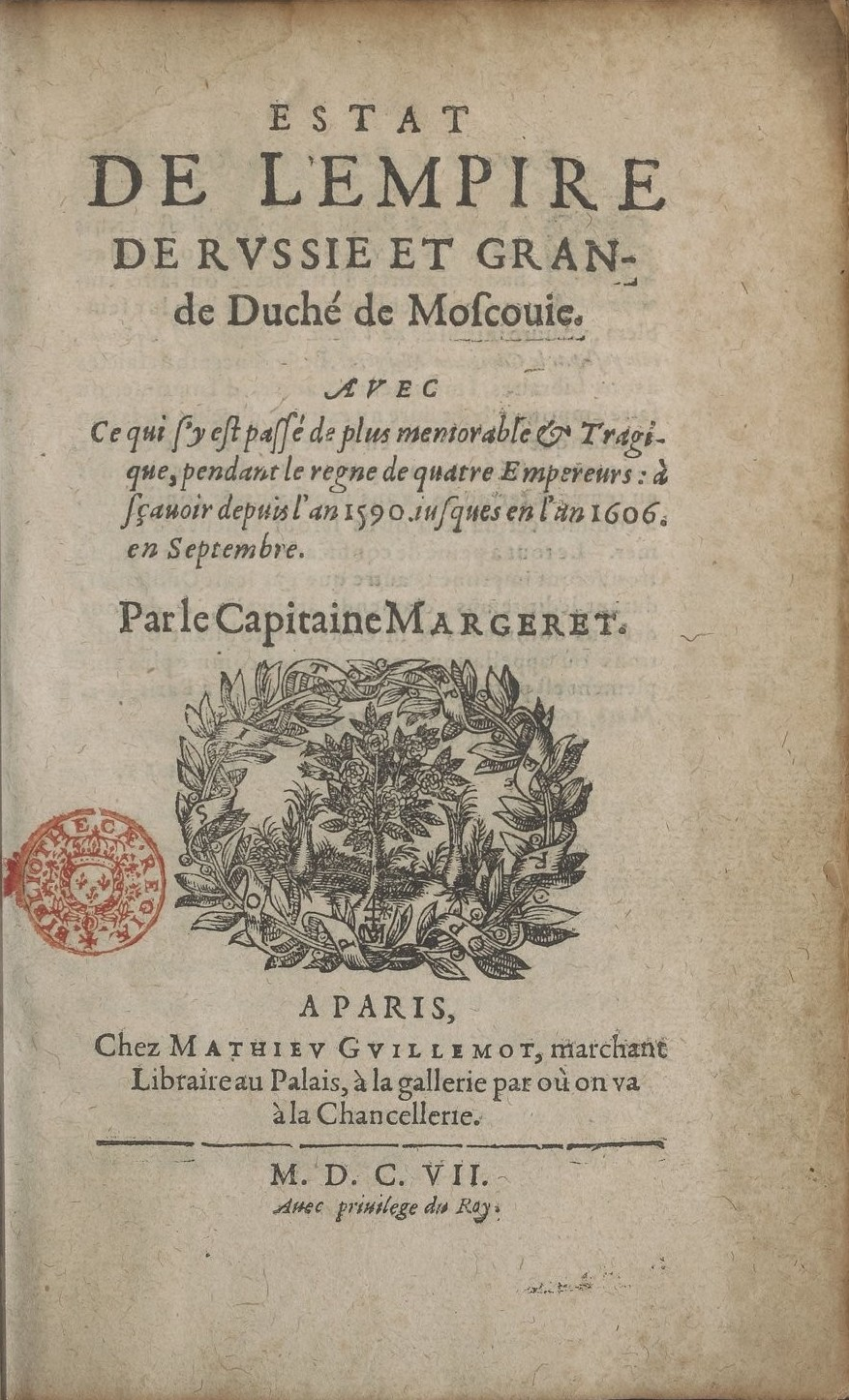
Title page of the first edition of the book by Jacques Margeret entitled Estate de l'Empire de Russie et de Grand Duché de Moscovie

Jacques Margeret (c. 1565 – c. 1619) was a French mercenary captain who, in 1607, wrote the first printed French travel account of the Tsardom of Russia, entitled, Estate de l'Empire de Russie et de Grand Duché de Moscovie.

== Early life ==
A member of one of the oldest families of Auxonne, located on the border between Burgundy and Franche-Comté, Margeret was probably born around 1565. He grew up in the turbulent period known as the French Wars of Religion, in a Protestant family. Becoming a soldier, he fought for the Protestant King Henry IV of France against the Catholic League, serving the king until Henry's conversion to Catholicism in 1593.

== Mercenary service ==
After leaving Henry's service, Margeret joined the crusade against the Turks in southeastern Europe. He first served with the Prince of Transylvania and then with the Holy Roman Emperor in Hungary. Next, he commanded a company of foot soldiers in Poland. He returned then to Austria where a Muscovite ambassador invited him to Moscow in 1600.

=== Mercenary service in Russia ===
After arriving in Moscow, Margeret received command of a company of foreign mercenaries (cavalry) from Tsar Boris Godunov. For his service he received an annual pay of 80 rubles and nearly 1,000 acres (4 km^{2}) of land. After several years service, Margeret rose to the rank of overall commander of the Tsar’s foreign troops. He was a part of the army that was sent to repel the False Dmitry's invasion of Muscovy in 1604–05. In fact, his actions at the Battle of Dobrynichi were decisive in the defeat of Dmitry's forces. When, after Boris's death in 1605, the Tsar's army submitted to the rule of the Pretender Dmitry, Margeret and his foreign mercenaries had little choice but to also serve Dmitry. In Jan 1606, Margeret was appointed commander of Palace Guards. In May of that year Dmitry was assassinated. Although his successor Vasily Shuisky dismissed most of the foreign mercenaries, Margeret was asked to remain. He did so until the summer of 1606, at which time he asked permission to leave, departing from Arkhangelsk for France in September 1606.

== Return to France ==
When Margeret returned to France he presented himself to King Henry, telling the king his adventures. Henri refused to have such a noble man killed hence he ordered Margeret to write about his experiences. Margeret spent the winter of 1606–07 writing, thankful that he was alive. The book Estate de l'Empire de Russie et de Grand Duché de Moscovie was fully sponsored by the King and printed in Paris in 1607.

This book was reprinted in France several times, including in 1859 with improved notes by Henri Chevreul and the French author Prosper Mérimée.

It was last published in 1983 by Editions La Découverte/Maspéro (Paris) under the title Un mousquetaire à Moscou: mémoires sur la première révolution russe, 1604-1614, with a large historical introduction, as well as notes and a bibliography by the French historian and Russia expert Alexandre Bennigsen.

== Later mercenary service ==
In 1609 he joined the forces of the man claiming to be the Tsar Dmitry, revived miraculously from his assassination in 1606. In 1610 he joined the Polish army and distinguished himself at the Battle of Klushino (1611) and the march on Moscow that followed. Margeret left Moscow when he was recalled to Poland by King Sigismund. The king made him a member of the royal council, but Margeret did not stay in Poland. By January 1612 he wrote to John Merrick of the English Muscovy Company from Hamburg and is thought to have settled in the Palatinate in Germany. There is no trace of Margeret after 1619.

== See also ==
- List of foreign observers of Russia
