= Stephen of Bohemia =

Stephen of Bohemia was a Franciscan friar and a member of the Papal mission to the Mongol Empire in 1245–1247.

Stephen set out from Lyon with John of Pian del Carpine on 16 April 1245. They travelled through Bohemia to the territory of Duke Bolesław II of Silesia, where they were joined by Benedict of Poland at Wrocław. A certain Ceslaus, also from Bohemia, is mentioned once in the Tartar Relation, but this may be the same person as Stephen. Stephen fell ill not far beyond Kiev. As a consequence, he was left behind in Mongol-occupied Cumania, possibly as a hostage. Ill health prevented him from ever going further. He did not visit the court of Batu, khan of the Golden Horde, or that of the Great Khan Güyük.

Stephen seems to have been picked up by the mission on its return. He was used as a source by the author of the Tartar Relation.

== Bibliography ==
- Czarnowus, Anna (2014). "The Mongols, Eastern Europe, and Western Europe: The Mirabilia Tradition in Benedict of Poland's Historia Tartarorum and John of Plano Carpini's Historia Mongalorum". Literature Compass. 11 (7): 484–495. doi:10.1111/lic3.12150.
- Michetti, Raimondo (2001). "Giovanni da Pian del Carpine". Dizionario Biografico degli Italiani, Volume 56: Giovanni Di Crescenzio–Giulietti (in Italian). Rome: Istituto dell'Enciclopedia Italiana. ISBN 978-8-81200032-6.
- Phillips, Kim M. (2014). Before Orientalism: Asian Peoples and Cultures in European Travel Writing, 1245–1510. University of Pennsylvania Press.
- Ruotsala, Antti (2002). Europeans and Mongols in the Middle of the Thirteenth Century: Encountering the Other. Finnish Academy of Sciences.
