= Friar Julian =

13th-century Hungarian explorer

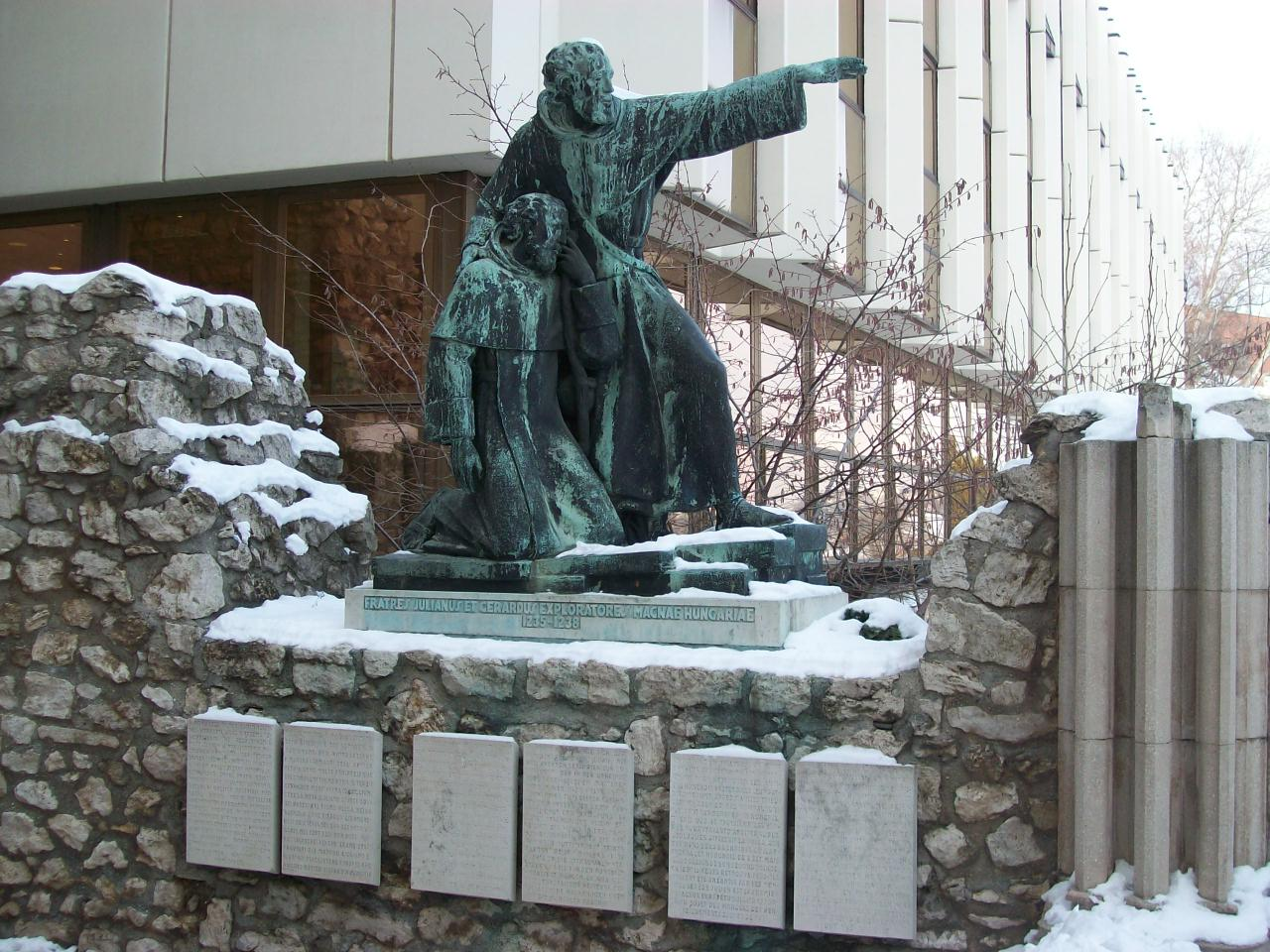
Julian and Gerard, by Károly Antal, Budapest

Friar Julian (Hungarian: Julianus barát) was one of a group of Hungarian Dominican friars who, in 1235, left Hungary in order to find those Magyars who—according to the chronicles—remained in the eastern homeland. After travelling a great distance, Friar Julian reached the capital of Volga Bulgaria, where he was told that the Magyars lived only two days' travel away. Julian found them, and despite the gap of at least 300–400 years since the split between the Magyars that invaded and settled in Pannonia and those that were found in Bashkiria, their language remained mutually intelligible, and they were able to communicate.

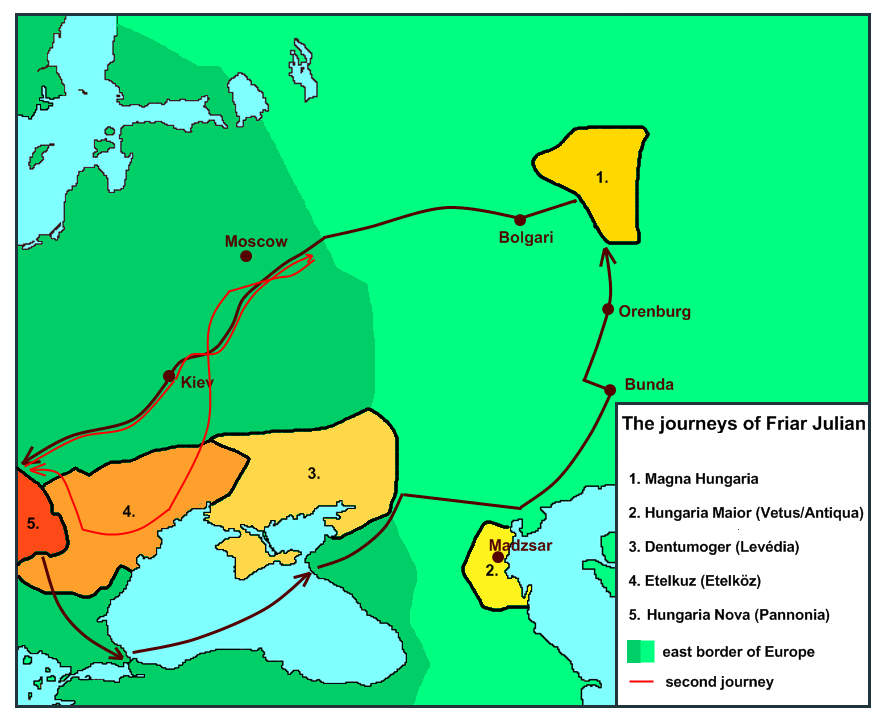
Friar Julian's journey

Julian named the old country Magna Hungaria. He became aware of stories about the Tatars, who were the enemies of the eastern Magyars and Bulgars. Two years after the original journey, Julian returned to Magna Hungaria, only to find it had been devastated by the Mongol Tatars. He returned to his kingdom with news of mortal danger and a Mongol ultimatum to Hungary.

The Dominican order, established in Hungary in 1221 with the aim of evangelizing the East, simultaneously raised the issue of discovering the Hungarians who had remained on the native soil. Julian was the first in centuries to bring to Europe valid information about Hungarians living in Magna Hungaria, which contributes much to research on Hungarian history. He was also the first European traveler to gather valid information on Asia, and his descriptions are of great importance from the geographical aspect, which gave essential motivation to future European explorers and researchers. Julian was also the first to bring news of the upcoming Mongol invasion of Europe.

Along with Relatio (1245–1246) by Benedict of Poland, Ystoria Mongalorum (1245–1246) by Giovanni da Pian del Carpine, and Itinerarium ad partes orientales (1255) by William of Rubruck, his Epistola de vita Tartarorum (1237) is among the earliest Western European sources to contain significant information about Russia, all of which date to the mid-13th century. Julian mentions Russia's eastern boundaries as lying on the banks of the Don and Volga rivers, with the borders of the principalities of Suzdal and Ryazan forming the frontier.

== See also ==
- Mongol invasion of Volga Bulgaria
- Battle of Mohi
- Eastern Magyars
- List of foreign observers of Russia

== Sources ==
- Mund, Stéphane (April 2002). "Travel Accounts as Early Sources of Knowledge about Russia in Medieval Western Europe from the mid-Thirteenth to the early Fifteenth Centuries". The Medieval History Journal. 5 (1): 103–120. doi:10.1177/097194580200500105.
