= Giles Fletcher, the Elder =

English poet, diplomat and politician (c. 1548 – 1611)

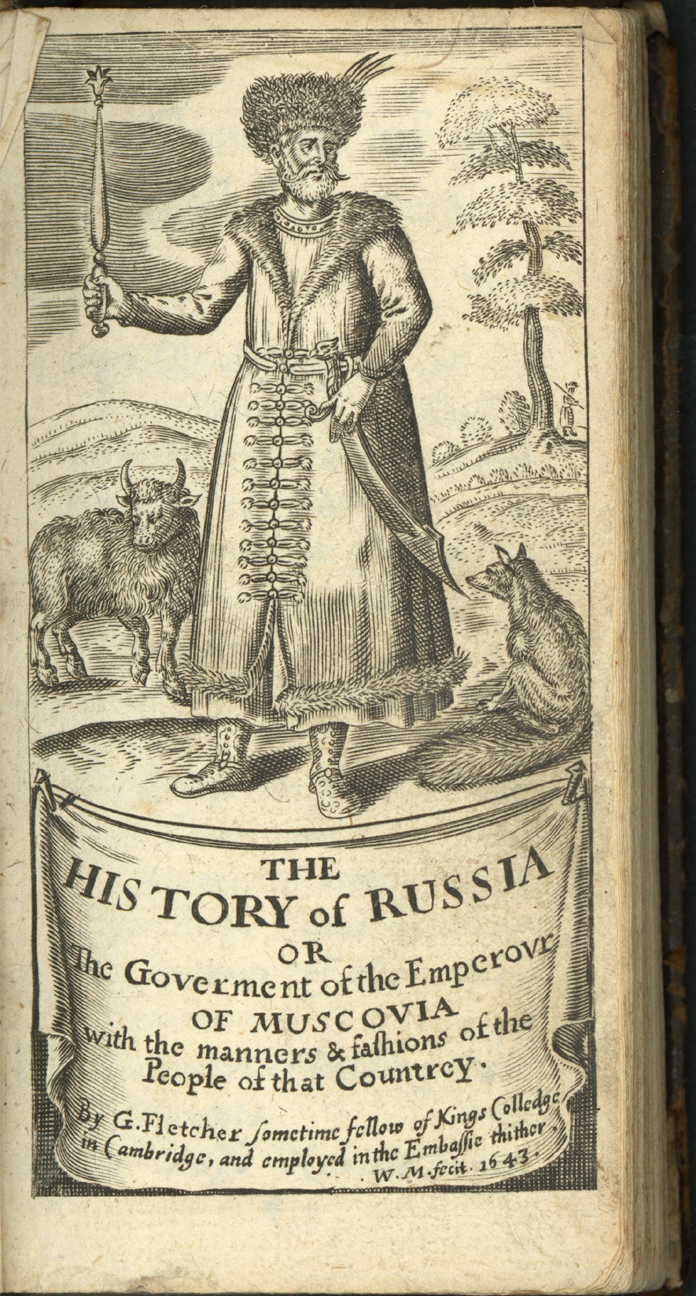
Giles Fletcher, The History of Russia titlepage, 2nd Ed. (1643)

Giles Fletcher, the Elder (c. 1548 – 1611) was an English poet and diplomat, and a member of the English Parliament.

He is best known for his sonnet Licia. He is the father of the poet Giles Fletcher, the Younger and the son of Richard Fletcher, vicar of Bishop's Stortford.

== Biography ==
Fletcher was born in Watford, Hertfordshire. He spent his early life at Cranbrook in Kent before entering Eton College in about 1561. From there, Fletcher continued his education at King's College, Cambridge, where he was appointed a fellow in 1568 and gained his Bachelor of Arts in the academic year 1569–1570.

Studying Greek and poetry, Fletcher contributed to the translation of several of Demosthenes' orations. On 22 March 1572, Fletcher became a lecturer in King's and held this position until March the following year, until he became a lecturer in Greek, a position which he held until Michaelmas term 1579. Continually rising within the academia, Fletcher rose to dean of arts, the highest position he was to attain at Kings, in 1580–1581. However, this would not last long, for he decided to marry, forcing him to give up his fellowship. On 16 January, in his father's church, he married Joan Sheafe. Returning to Cambridge later, he received his Doctor of Civil Law degree. After attaining his law degree, the family settled back in Cranbrook, where once again the family was united. On 8 April 1582, Giles and Joan's first child, Phineas, was baptized. During the same year, Giles was made chancellor of the diocese of Sussex.

In 1584, Fletcher was elected to the parliament which began on 23 November, for Winchelsea, one of the Cinque Ports. It was at this point that the Fletchers would permanently call London home. During his stint in Parliament, Fletcher served on three committees. In 1586, Fletcher was appointed as the Remembrancer of the City of London, an office which he held until 1605. In 1588, he was an ambassador to Russia to reestablish the treaty with Tsar Feodor I of Russia, but failed. Fletcher published a treatise, Of the Russe Common Wealth (1591). The treaty to be reestablished was primarily concerning the English trade, but before he departed Queen Elizabeth made him a Master of Requests. Fletcher's account gives a vivid description of the Russian world pre-1600.

== See also ==
- List of foreign observers of Russia

== Sources ==
- "Флетчер, Джильс" . Brockhaus and Efron Encyclopedic Dictionary (in Russian). 1906.
