= List of papal bulls =

This is an incomplete list of papal bulls, listed by the year in which each was issued.

The decrees of some papal bulls were often tied to the circumstances of time and place, and may have been adjusted, attenuated, or abrogated by subsequent popes as situations changed.

== List ==
=== Eleventh century ===
Year	Bull	Issuer	Description
1059	In nomine Domini ("In the name of the Lord")	Nicholas II	Establishing cardinal-bishops as the sole electors of the pope.
1079	Libertas ecclesiae ("The liberty of the Church")	Gregory VII	About Church's independence from imperial authority and interference.
1079	Antiqua sanctorum patrum ("The old (traces of the) holy fathers")	Gregory VII	Granted the church of Lyon primacy over the churches of Gaul.
1095 (March 16)	Cum universis sancte ("With all holy")	Urban II	The king or queen of Aragon could not be excommunicated without an express order from the pope.

=== Twelfth century ===
Year	Bull	Issuer	Description
1113 (February 15)	Pie Postulatio Voluntatis ("The most pious request")	Paschal II	Confirming the establishment and independence of the Knights Hospitaller, and placing the Order under Papal protection.
c. 1120	Sicut Judaeis ("Thus to the Jews")	Callixtus II	Provides protection for the Jews who suffered from the hands of the participants in the First Crusade.
1136 (July 7)	Ex commisso nobis ("From [the office] assigned to us")	Innocent II	Split Archbishop of Magdeburg from the rest of the Polish church.
1139 (March 29)	Omne Datum Optimum ("Every perfect gift")	Innocent II	Endorses the Knights Templar.
1144	Milites Templi ("Soldiers of the Temple")	Celestine II	Provides clergy protection to the Knights Templar and encourages contributions to their cause.
1145	Militia Dei ("Soldiers of God")	Eugene III	Allows the Knights Templar to take tithes and burial fees and to bury their dead in their own cemeteries.
1145 (December 1)	Quantum praedecessores ("How much did our predecessors")	Eugene III	Calls for the Second Crusade.
1146 (October 5)	Divina dispensatione ("By divine dispensation")	Eugene III	Calls for the Italian clergy to support the Second Crusade.
1147 (April 11)	Divina dispensatione	Eugene III	Calls for the Wendish Crusade.
1155	Laudabiliter ("Laudably")	Adrian IV	Gives the English King Henry II lordship over Ireland.
1171 or 1172 (September 11)	Non parum animus noster ("Our soul [is] extremely [distressed]")	Alexander III	Calls for the Northern Crusades against the Estonians and Finns.
1179 (May 23)	Manifestis Probatum ("It is clearly demonstrated")	Alexander III	Recognition of the kingdom of Portugal and Afonso Henriques as the first king.
1184 (November 4)	Ad Abolendam ("In order to abolish")	Lucius III	Condemns heresy, and lists some punishments (though stops short of death).
1187 (October 29)	Audita tremendi ("Hearing what terrible...")	Gregory VIII	Calls for the Third Crusade.
1192	Cum universi ("To all those...")	Celestine III	Defined the Scottish Church as immediately subject to the Holy See.
1192 (December 23)	Cum Romana ecclesia ("With the Roman Church")	Celestine III	Orders Archbishop Absalon of Lund to place the kingdom of Denmark under interdict and excommunicate Duke Valdemar if the bishop of Schleswig was not released from prison.
1192 (December 23)	Etsi sedes debeat ("Even if the seat is due")	Celestine III	Admonished the clergy of Denmark for allowing the bishop of Schleswig to be imprisoned and to work for his release.
1192 (December 23)	Quanto magnitudinem tuam ("How big are you?")	Celestine III	Informs King Knud VI, that imprisoning the bishop of Schleswig is a crime, and his kingdom faces interdict if the bishop is not released.
1198	Post Miserabile ("Sadly, after...")	Innocent III	Calls for the Fourth Crusade.
1199 (March 25)	Vergentis in senium ("Approaching old age")	Innocent III	This bull, addressed to the city of Viterbo, announced that heresy would be considered, in terms of punishment, the same as treason.

=== Thirteenth century ===
Year	Bull	Issuer	Description
1205	Esti Judaeos ("You are Jews")	Innocent III	Jews were allowed their own houses of worship and would not be forced to convert. Jews were forbidden to eat with Christians or own Christian slaves.
1213 (April)	Quia maior ("Because a more...")	Innocent III	Calls for the Fifth Crusade.
1214 (April 21)	Bulla Aurea ("Golden bull")	Innocent III	Ended papal sanctions against King John in England and the Lordship of Ireland in exchange for that realm's pledge of fealty to the papacy. This bull confirmed John's royal charter of 3 October 1213 bearing a golden seal, sometimes called the Bulla Aurea. Payment of the annual tribute of 1,000 marks was finally vetoed by parliament in 1365 under Edward III.
1215 (August 24)	Pro rege Johanne ("For the King John")	Innocent III	Declares Magna Carta "null, and void of all validity for ever" in favor of King John against the barons
1216 (December)	Religiosam vitam ("The religious life")	Honorius III	Established the Dominican Order
1218	In generali concilio ("In the general council")	Honorius III	Demanded the enforcement of the 4th Lateran Council that Jews wear clothing to distinguish themselves and that Jews be made to pay the tithe to local churches.
1219	Super Specula ("On the mirrors")	Honorius III	Closed law schools in Paris and forbade most clergy from the study of civil law.
1223 (November 29)	Solet annuere ("He usually nods")	Honorius III	Approves the Rule of St. Francis.
1225 (June)	Vineae Domini custodes ("Guardians of the vineyard of the Lord")	Honorius III	Grants two Dominican friars, Dominic of Segovia and Martin, authorisation for a mission to Morocco.
1228	Mira Circa Nos ("Wonders around us")	Gregory IX	Canonizing St. Francis of Assisi
1230	Quo elongati ("Where are you going")	Gregory IX	Resolved issues concerning the testament of Francis of Assisi.
1231 (April 13)	Parens scientiarum ("The Mother of Sciences")	Gregory IX	Guarantees the independence of the University of Paris.
1232 (February 8)	Ille humani generis ("That of the human race")	Gregory IX	Instructed the Dominican prior of Regensburg to form an Inquisitional tribunal.
1233 (April 6)	Etsi Judaeorum ("Even if the Jews")	Gregory IX	Demands that Jews in Christian countries be treated with the same humanity with which Christians wish to be treated in heathen lands.
1233 (June)	Vox in Rama ("A voice in Ramah")	Gregory IX	Calls for action against Luciferians, a sect of suspected Devil worshippers
1233	Licet ad capiendos ("Allowed to catch")	Gregory IX	Marks the start of the Inquisition by the Church.
1233 (March 5)	Sufficere debuerat ("It should be enough")	Gregory IX	Forbids Christians to dispute on matters of faith with Jews
1234	Pietati proximum ("Close to piety")	Gregory IX	Confirms Germanic Orders rule of Kulmerland.
1234	Rex pacificus ("King of Peace")	Gregory IX	Announcement of the Liber Extra, the collection of papal decretals.
1234 (July 3)	Fons Sapientiae ("The source of wisdom")	Gregory IX	Canonizes Saint Dominic
1234 (November 17)	Rachel suum videns	Gregory IX	Calls for a crusade to the Holy Land and orders Dominicans and Franciscans to preach in favour of it.
1235	Cum hora undecima ("Since the eleventh hour")	Gregory IX	First bull authorizing friars to preach to pagan nations.
1239 (June 20)	Si vera sunt ("If they are true")	Gregory IX	Orders the seizure and examination of Jewish writings, especially the Talmud, suspected of blasphemies against Christ and the Church.
1243	Qui iustis causis ("Who for just reasons")	Innocent IV	Orders a crusade to the Baltic lands. Repeated 1256 and 1257.
1244	Impia judeorum perfidia ("The impious perfidy of the Jews")	Innocent IV	Stated that Jews could not hire Christian nurses.
1244 (March 9)	Impia gens ("Impious nation")	Innocent IV	Ordering Talmud to be burned
1245 (January 23)	Terra Sancta Christi ("The holy land of Christ")	Innocent IV	Calls for a crusade to the Holy Land.
1245 (March 5)	Dei patris immensa ("God the Father's immense...")	Innocent IV	Exposition of the Christian faith, and urged Mongols to accept baptism.
1245 (March 13)	Cum non solum ("With not only...")	Innocent IV	Appeal to the Mongols to desist from attacking Christians and other nations, and an enquiry as to their future intentions. Innocent expresses desire for peace (possibly unaware that in the Mongol vocabulary, "peace" is a synonym for "subjection").
1245 (March 20)	Inter alia desiderabilia ("Among other desirable things")	Innocent IV	Charges against Sancho II of Portugal
1245 (late March)	Cum simus super ("For we are on top")	Innocent IV	Letter addressed to multiple prelates and 'Christians of the East' which affirmed the primacy of the Roman Church and urged ecclesiastical unity.
1245 (July 17)	Ad Apostolicae Dignitatis Apicem ("To the highest point of apostolic dignity")	Innocent IV	Ad Apostolicae Dignitatis Apicem was an apostolic letter issued against Holy Roman Emperor Frederick II by Pope Innocent IV (1243–54), during the Council of Lyon, 17 July 1245, the third year of his pontificate.
1245 (July 24)	Grandi non immerito ("With good reason")	Innocent IV	Removes Sancho II of Portugal from the throne, to be replaced by his brother Afonso, Count of Boulogne.
1246 (September 13)	Ut pressi quondam ("As once pressed")	Innocent IV	Concessio to the conversos the access to Orders
1247 (July 9)	Sicut Judaeis ("And thus, to the Jews")	Innocent IV	Innocent IV's reissuance of the longstanding papal policy regarding treatment of the Jews, it further forbade blood libel accusations
1247 (October 1)	Quae honorem conditoris omnium ("Which honors the creator of all")	Innocent IV	On the rules of the Carmelite Order
1248 (November 22)	Viam agnoscere veritatis ("To know the way of truth")	Innocent IV	Letter addressed to Baiju, king of the Mongols, in response to his embassy.
1249	De indulgencia xi dierum ("On the indulgence of eleven days")	Innocent IV	An indulgence to all the faithful who visit the Shrine of St. Margaret in Scotland
1252 (May 15)	Ad extirpanda ("For the elimination")	Innocent IV	Authorizes the use of torture for eliciting confessions from heretics during the Inquisition and executing relapsed heretics by burning them alive.
1254 (October 6)	Querentes in agro ("Complaining in the field")	Innocent IV	Recognised the University of Oxford and "confirmed its liberties, ancient customs and approved statutes".
1255	Clara claris praeclara ("Clare outstandingly clear")	Alexander IV	On the canonization of St. Clare of Assisi
1255 (April 6)	Inter ea quae placita ("Among those pleasing")	Alexander IV	Confirms the establishment of the University of Salamanca
1255 (September 22)	Dignum arbitramur ("We consider suitable")	Alexander IV	Grants that degrees conferred by the University of Salamanca be valid everywhere
1255 (April 14)	Quasi lignum vitae ("Like the tree of life")	Alexander IV	Rejects all measures against dominican professors at the University of Paris; ends the numerus clausus for the chairs of theology.
1256	Ut negotium ("As a business")	Alexander IV	Allowed the inquisitors to absolve each other for any "canonical irregularities in their important work".
1258	Quod super nonnullis ("Which is above some")	Alexander IV	Ordered all papal inquisitors to avoid investigating charges of divination and sorcery unless they also "clearly savored of manifest heresy."
1261 (April 29)	Ad Audientiam Nostram ("To our audience")	Alexander IV	Released Henry III of England from his oath to the Barons to maintain the Provisions of Oxford.
1263/1264	Exultavit cor nostrum ("Our heart has rejoiced")	Urban IV	Letter from Urban to Hulagu, discussing the arrival of Hulagu's (uncredentialed) envoy John the Hungarian, cautiously welcoming, and announcing that William II of Agen, Latin Patriarch of Jerusalem, would be investigating further.
1264	?	Urban IV	Discussion of the Egyptian threat (no mention of Mongols).
1260s (undated)	Audi filia et ("Hear, O daughter, and")	Urban IV or Clement IV	Caution to Queen Plaisance of Cyprus to cease her unchaste ways, and marry
1260s (undated)	De sinu patris ("The bosom of the Father")	Urban IV or Clement IV	Admonishment to an unnamed nobleman to cease his adultery and return to his wife
1265	Licet Ecclesiarum ("Although the churches")	Clement IV	Stated that appointments to all benefices were a papal prerogative.
1265	Parvus fons ("Small spring")	Clement IV	Strengthened the general chapter of the Cistercians
1267 (July 26)	Turbato corde ("With disturbed heart")	Clement IV	Legally barred Christians from converting to Judaism.
1272		Gregory X	Confirms the "Sicut Judæis"
1272 (July 7)	"Letter on Jews"	Gregory X	Against the Blood Libel
1273 (April 20)	Prae cunctis mentis ("Above all minds")	Gregory X	Sets the procedure for the Inquisition in France headed by the Dominicans.
1274	Ubi Periculum ("Where there is danger")	Gregory X	Established the papal conclave as the method of selection for a pope, imposing progressively stricter restrictions on cardinals the longer a conclave lasted to encourage a quick selection.
1278 (August 4)	Vineam Sorec	Nicholas III	Ordering conversion sermons to Jews
1279	Exiit qui seminat ("He who sows goes out")	Nicholas III	Confirming the rules of the Friar Minor
1281	Ad fructus uberes ("To fruitful fruits")	Martin IV	Gave Franciscan priests the right to preach and hear confession.
1283	Exultantes ("Exultant")	Martin IV	Relaxed the restrictions on poverty for Franciscans.
1288	Habet carissima filia ("He has a dear daughter")	Nicholas IV	Letter sent to Christian women at the court of the Mongol Ilkhan
1289	Supra Motem ("Above the noise")	Nicholas IV	On the Rule of the Third Order of St. Francis
1291 (January 30)	Orat mater ecclesia ("Mother Church prays")	Nicholas IV	To protect the Roman Jews from oppression
1291 (March)	Prae cunctis ("Above all")	Nicholas IV	Authorized the Franciscans to start the inquisition in Bosnia.
1291	Gaudemus in Domino ("Happiness in the Lord")	Nicholas IV	Letter sent to Arghun's third wife, Uruk Khatun, the mother of Nicholas (Oljeitu), Arghun's successor.
1291	Pastoralis officii ("Pastoral office")	Nicholas IV	Letter sent to two young Mongol princes, Saron and Cassian, urging their conversion to Christianity.
1294	Inter sanctorum solemnia ("Among the saints' feasts")	Celestine V	Grants plenary indulgence to anyone who confessed, communicated and visited the Basilica of Santa Maria di Collemaggio from Vespers of August 28 to Vespers of the following day
1296 (January 20)	Redemptor mundi ("Redeemer of the world")	Boniface VIII	Named James II of Aragon as standardbearer, captain-general, and admiral of the Roman Church.
1296 (February 25)	Clericis Laicos ("Lay clerics")	Boniface VIII	Excommunicates all members of the clergy who, without authorization from the Holy See, pay to laymen any part of their income or the revenue of the Church, and all rulers who receive such payments.
1297	Super reges et regna ("About kings and kingdoms")	Boniface VIII	Bestowed on James II of Aragon the Kingdom of Sardinia and Corsica.
1297	Excelso throno ("On the high throne")	Boniface VIII	Jacopo Colonna and Pietro Colonna, both cardinals, were excommunicated by Pope Boniface VIII for refusing to surrender their relative Stefano Colonna (who had seized and robbed the pope's nephew) and refusing to give the pope Palestrina along with two fortresses, which threatened the pope. This excommunication was extended in the same year to Jacopo's nephews and their heirs, after the two Colonna cardinals denounced the pope's election as invalid and appealed to a general council.
1299 (June 13)	Exhibita nobis ("Shown to us")	Boniface VIII	Declares Jews be included among persons who might be denounced to the Inquisition without the name of the accuser revealed
1299 (June 27)	Scimus, Fili ("We know, my son")	Boniface VIII	Challenged Edward I's claim to Scotland, stating the Scottish kingdom belonged to the apostolic see.
1299	De Sepulturis ("About the burials")	Boniface VIII	Prohibited Crusaders from dismembering and boiling of the bodies, known as Mos Teutonicus so that the bones, separated from the flesh, may be carried for burial in their own countries.
1299	Fuit olim ("It was once upon a time")	Boniface VIII	Denounces any who supply arms, ammunition, and provisions to the Saracens

=== Fourteenth century ===
Year	Bull	Issuer	Description
1300 (22 February)	Antiquorum habet fida relatio ("The ancients have a faithful record")	Boniface VIII	Reinstates the Jubilee Years, granting indulgence during those years for those who fulfill various conditions.
1301 (5 December)	Ausculta Fili ("Hear, son")	Boniface VIII	Requests that the King of France repent for not submitting to Papal authority.
1302 (November 18)	Unam Sanctam ("The One Holy")	Boniface VIII	Declares that there is no salvation outside the Church (Extra Ecclesiam nulla salus), and that the Church must remain united.
1303	Excomminicamus et anathematazimus("We excommunicate and anathematize")	Boniface VIII	Directed against those who molest persons travelling to and from Rome
1305	Exivi de paradiso ("I went out of paradise")	Clement V	On the rules of the Friar Minor
1307 (November 22)	Pastoralis Praeeminentiae ("Pastoral preeminence")	Clement V	Orders the arrest of the Knights Templar and the confiscation of their possessions.
1307 (July 23)	Rex regnum ("King of the kingdom")	Clement V	Nominates seven Franciscans to act as papal suffragans in China.
1308	Faciens misericordiam ("Granting forgiveness")	Clement V	Sets out the procedure to prosecute the Knights Templar.
1308 (August 12)	Regnans in caelis ("Reigning in heaven")	Clement V	Convenes the Council of Vienne to discuss the Knights Templar.
1310 (April 4)	Alma mater ("A nurturing mother")	Clement V	Postpones the opening of the Council of Vienne until 1 October 1311, on account of the investigation of the Templars that was not yet finished.
1312 (March 22)	Vox in excelso ("A voice from on high")	Clement V	Disbands the Knights Templar.
1312 (May 2)	Ad providam ("To provide")	Clement V	Grants the bulk of Templar property on to the Knights Hospitallers.
1312 (May 6)	Considerantes dudum ("Considering for a while")	Clement V	Outlined the disposition for members of the Knights Templar.
1312 (May 6)	Exivi de paradiso ("I left paradise")	Clement V	Stated the conditions of Franciscan rule.
1312 (May 16)	Nuper in concilio ("Recently in the council")	Clement V	Grants further Templar property to the Knights Hospitallers
1312 (December 18)	Licet dudum ("Although a while ago...")	Clement V	Suspends privileges and confirms the disposition of property of the Knights Templar.
1312 (December 31)	Dudum in generali concilio ("Some time ago in the general council...")	Clement V	Further considerations as to the question of the Templars' property.
1313 (January 13)	Licet pridem ("Although long ago...")	Clement V	Further considerations as to the question of the Templars' property.
1313	Pastoralis Cura ("Pastoral care")	Clement V	The first legal expression of territorial sovereignty. ... Ruled that an emperor could not judge a king ... that public power was territorially confined.
1317	Sane Considerante ("Considering...")	John XXII	Elevated the Diocese of Toulouse to Archbishop and created six new bishoprics.
1317	Sancta Romana ("The Holy Roman...")	John XXII	Addressed the claim that the Franciscan Tuscan Spirituals had been authorized by Celestine V.
1317 (March 31)	Si Fratrum ("If brothers...")	John XXII	Negates any imperial-bestowed titles that are not confirmed by the Pope.
1317 (October)	Quorundam exigit ("The demands of some")	John XXII	Reiterated Clement V's bull, Exivi de paradiso, while stating that friars who disagreed with their superiors would not accuse them of violating Franciscan rule.
1318 (January 23)	Gloriosam ecclesiam ("Glorious Church")	John XXII	The Franciscan "Spirituals" of Tuscany are declared Donatist heretics and excommunicated.
1318 (April 1)	Redemptor noster ("Our redeemer")	John XXII	Withdrew the Mongol Ilkhan's dominions and 'India' from the archdiocese of Khanbaligh, transferring to a Dominican province
1319 (March 14)	Ad ea ex quibus	John XXII	Created Portuguese Order of Christ.
1322	Quia nonnunquam ("For sometimes...")	John XXII	Freedom of discussion in poverty controversy
1322	Ad conditorem canonum ("The maker of the canons")	John XXII	Continuation of poverty controversy
1323	Cum inter nonnullos ("When among some")	John XXII	Defines the belief in the poverty of Christ and the Apostles as heretical.
1324	Quia quorundam ("Because of some")	John XXII	Condemned those who disagreed with Cum inter nonnullos
1329 (16 Nov)	Quia vir reprobus ("Because a reprobate man...")	John XXII	Declared the right to hold property pre-dated the Fall and noted that the Apostles owned personal property.
1329	In agro dominico ("In the Lord's field")	John XXII	Condemned 28 propositions of Meister Eckhart and their further distribution.
1333 (December 2)	Summa providit altitudo consilii ("The highest high of counsel provided")	John XXII	
1336	Benedictus Deus ("On the beatific vision of God")	Benedict XII	Declared that the saved see Heaven (and thus, God) before Judgement Day.
1337 (August 29)	Ex zelo fidei ("Out of zeal for faith")	Benedict XII	Promising inquiry into host-desecration of Pulkau
1338	Exultanti precepimus ("We ordered the exultant...")	Benedict XII	Letter to Mongol ruler Ozbeg and his family, thanking them for having granted land to Franciscans to build a church
1338	Dundum ad notitiam ("For your information...")	Benedict XII	Letter to Mongol ruler Ozbeg recommending ambassadors, and thanking Ozbeg for prior favors shown to missionaries
1342	Gratiam Agimus ("We are grateful")	Clement VI	Declared the Franciscan Order as the official Custodian of the Holy Land in the name of the Church.
1343 (January 27)	Unigenitus ("The only-begotten [Son of God]")	Clement VI	Declared a Jubilee every 50 years and justified papal power to issue indulgences
1348 (September 26)	Quamvis Perfidiam ("Despite treachery")	Clement VI	An attempt to dispel the rumor that the Jews caused the Black Death by poisoning wells.
1350	Cum natura humana ("With human nature")	Clement VI	
1363	Apostolatus Officium ("Apostolic Office"), (sometimes known as In Coena Domini)	Urban V	Against pirates, those who supply arms to Saracens, and those who intercept supplies intended for Rome
1372	Excomminicamus et anathematazimus ("We excommunicate and anathematize")	Gregory XI	Excommunicating forgers of Letters Apostolic
1383	Quia sicut ("Because like...")	Urban VI	Regarding ecclesiastical immunities

=== Fifteenth century ===
Year	Bull	Issuer	Description
1409 (December 20)		Alexander V	Order to suppress all the books of John Wycliffe in Bohemia.
1413 (August 28)	Confirmationis Privilegiorum Universitati Sancti Andreæ ("Confirmation of the privileges of the University of St. Andrew")	Benedict XIII	Grants university status to the Augustinian society of higher learning in St Andrews, Fife, Scotland which became the University of St Andrews
1415 (May 11)	Etsi doctoribus gentium ("Even though the teachers of the nations")	Benedict XIII	Against Talmud or any other Jewish book attacking Christianity
1417		Benedict XIII	Bull against Talmud
1418	Quod Antidota ("That cures")	Martin V	Exempt jurisdiction of Ecclesiastical courts
1418 (April 4)	Sane charissimus ("Of course, my dearest")	Martin V	After the seizure of Ceuta called on all to support John I of Portugal in his war against the Moors
1420 (March 1)	Omnium Plasmatoris Domini ("Lord, the creator of all things")	Martin V	Calls for a crusade against followers of Jan Hus, John Wycliffe, and other heretics. It initiates the Hussite Wars.
1420 (November 25)	Concessum Judaæis ("Concession to the Jews")	Martin V	To German Jews confirming their privileges
1420 (December 23)	Licet Judæorum omnium ("Although all Jews")	Martin V	In favor of Austrian Jews
1421		Martin V	To the Benedictine Abbey of St. Bertin at St. Omer, granting permission for the monks to elect their own confessors.
1423 (June 3)	Sedes apostolica ("The Apostolic See")	Martin V	Renews law requiring Jews to wear badge
1425	Sapientie immarcessibilis ("Unfading in wisdom")	Martin V	Foundation of the Old University of Leuven
1425	Mare Anglicanum ("Mother of England")	Martin V	Confirmed the bull Mare Magnum and gave Syon independence from Vadstena and the general order chapter house.
1428	Ad Repremendas ("To suppress")	Martin V	Supreme jurisdiction of the Roman court
1429 (February 15)	Quamquam Judæi ("Although Jews")	Martin V	Places Roman Jews under the general civic law, protects them from forcible baptism, and permits them to teach in the school
	Etsi cunctis fidei ("Though everyone believes")	Eugene IV	Prohibited imposition of inordinately high dues on converted Canary islanders
1434 (December 17)	Creator Omnium ("Creator of all")	Eugene IV	On slave raiding in the Canaries
1435	Sicut Dudum ("Like a while ago")	Eugene IV	Forbidding the slavery of converted local natives in the Canary Islands by Spanish and Portuguese slave traders.
1437 (September 18)	Doctoris gentium ("Teacher of the nations")	Eugene IV	Transfers the Council of Basel to Ferrara
1437	Praeclaris tuae ("You are excellent")	Eugene IV	
1439 (January)		Eugene IV	Transfers the Council of Ferrara to Florence because of the plague
1439 (July 6)	Laetentur Caeli ("Rejoicing of the Heavens")	Eugene IV	Officially re-united the Roman Catholic Church with the Eastern Orthodox Churches. This agreement was quickly repudiated by most eastern bishops.
1442 (February 4)	Cantate Domino ("Sing praises to the Lord")	Eugene IV	Part of an attempt by the Catholic Church to reunite with other Christian groups including the Coptic Church of Egypt.
1442 (August 8)	Dudum ad nostram audientiam ("For a while now, to our audience")	Eugene IV	Complete separation of Jews and Christians (ghetto).
1442 (August 10)	Super Gregem Dominicum ("Over the flock of the Lord")	Eugene IV	Revokes the privileges of the Castilian Jews and imposes severe restrictions on them. Forbids Castilian Christians to eat, drink, live or bathe with Jews or Muslims and declaring invalid the testimony of Jews or Muslims against Christians.
1442 (December 19)	Illius qui se pro divini ("Of him who believes in God")	Eugene IV	On Henry of Portugal's crusade against the Saracens
1443 (January 5)	Rex regum ("King of kings")	Eugene IV	Takes neutral position on territorial disputes between Portugal and Castile regarding rights claimed in Africa.
1447 (June 23)	Super Gregem Dominicum ("Over the Lord's flock")	Nicholas V	Re-issues Eugene IV's bull against Castilian Jews to Italy.
1451 (January 7)		Nicholas V	Foundation of the University of Glasgow.
1451 (March 1)	Super Gregem Dominicum	Nicholas V	Third issuance of Eugenius IV's bull. Confirms the earlier revocation of privileges and restrictions against Spanish and Italian Jews.
1451 (September 21)	Romanus pontifex ("The Roman Pontiff")	Nicholas V	Relieving the dukes of Austria from ecclesiastical censure for permitting Jews to dwell there
1452 (June 18)	Dum diversas ("While different")	Nicholas V	Authorizes Afonso V of Portugal to reduce any Muslims, pagans, and other unbelievers to perpetual slavery.
1453 (September 30)	Etsi ecclesia Christi ("Even though the church of Christ...")	Nicholas V	Calls for a crusade to reverse the fall of Constantinople.
1454 (January 8)		Nicholas V	Concedes to Afonso V all conquests in Africa from Cape Non to Guinea, with authorization to build churches
1454 (January 8)		Nicholas V	Extended Portuguese dominion over all the seas from Africa to India.
1455 (January 8)	Romanus Pontifex ("The Roman pontiff")	Nicholas V	Granting the Portuguese a perpetual monopoly in trade with Africa and allows the enslavement of natives.
1455 (May 15)	Ad summi apostolatus apicem ("At the peak of the highest apostolate")	Callixtus III	Confirmed the bull Etsi ecclesia Christi.
1456 (March 13)	Inter Caetera ("Among the other")	Callixtus III	Confirmed the Bull Romanus Pontifex and gave the Portuguese Order of Christ the spiritualities of all lands acquired and to be acquired.
1456 (June 20)	Cum hiis superioribus annis and is titled Bulla Turcorum ("With these previous years; Turkish Bull")	Callixtus III	Announces the Fall of Constantinople and seeks funding for another crusade against the Turks.
1458 (October 13)	Vocavit nos pius ("Kindly, He called us.")	Pius II	Invites the European powers to the Congress of Mantua.
1458	Veram semper et solidam ("Always true and solid")	Pius II	Orders the creation of the Order of Our Lady of Bethlehem to protect Christians in Greek waters from the Ottomans.
1460 (January 14)	Ecclesiam Christi ("The Church of Christ")	Pius II	Calls for a three-year crusade against the Ottoman Empire.
1460 (January 18)	Execrabilis ("Execrable")	Pius II	Prohibits appealing a papal judgment to a future general council.
1462 (April 28)	Cum almam nostram urbem ("With our beloved city")	Pius II	Prohibits the destruction or removal of the ancient ruins in Rome and Campagna.
1463 (October 22)	Ezechielis prophetae ("The prophet Ezekiel")	Pius II	Calls for a crusade against the Ottoman Empire.
1470 (April 19)	Ineffabilis providentia ("Ineffable Providence")	Paul II	Declared that a Jubilee would take place every 25 years.
1476	Regimini Gregis ("To the management of the flock")	Sixtus IV	Threatens to excommunicate all captains or pirates who enslave Christians
1478 (November 1)	Exigit sinceræ devotionis ("Demanding sincere devotion")	Sixtus IV	Authorized Ferdinand and Isabella to appoint inquisitors which created the Spanish Inquisition.
1481 (April 8)	Cogimur jubente altissimo ("Compelled by the command of the Most High")	Sixtus IV	Calls for a crusade against the Ottoman Empire.
1481 (June 21)	Aeterni regis ("Of the eternal king['s grace]")	Sixtus IV	Confirms the Treaty of Alcáçovas.
1482 (April 14)	Superna caelestis ("Heavenly, heavenly")	Sixtus IV	By which Blessed Bonaventure, Is registered in the Canon of the Saints
1482 (August 2)	Ad Perpetuam Rei memoriam ("For the perpetual memory of the event")	Sixtus IV	Ordered humanitarian reforms to the Spanish Inquisition.
1484 (December 5)	Summis desiderantes affectibus ("Desiring with the highest affections")	Innocent VIII	Condemns an alleged outbreak of witchcraft and heresy in the region of the Rhine River valley, and deputizes Heinrich Kramer and Jacob Sprenger as inquisitors to root out alleged witchcraft in Germany.
1486 (July 12)	Catholice fidei defensionem ("Defense of the Catholic faith")	Innocent VIII	Grants plenary indulgences to whoever took part in Casimir IV Jagiellon's war against the Ottoman Empire.
1487 (April 27)	Id Nostri Cordis ("That of our hearts")	Innocent VIII	Ordered execution of waldenses and indulgences to those who took part.
1487 (November 13)	Universo pene orbi ("Almost the entire world")	Innocent VIII	Calls for a crusade against the Ottoman Empire.
1491	Officii nostri ("Our office")	Innocent VIII	(This may be a confusion with the decretal of Innocent III of the same name.)
1493 (May 3)	Eximiae devotionis ("Of exceptional devotion")	Alexander VI	Accords to Spain recognition of the same rights and privileges regarding lands discovered in the west as had been previously confirmed to Portugal in the east.
1493 (May 4)	Inter caetera ("Among the other")	Alexander VI	On the division of the "undiscovered world" between Spain and Portugal, beginning with the lands visited by Columbus.
1493 (June 25)	Piis Fidelium ("Pious believers")	Alexander VI	Grants Spain vicarial power to appoint missionaries to the Indies.
1493 (September 26)	Dudum siquidem ("A short while ago")	Alexander VI	Territorial grants supplemental to Inter caetera
1495 (February 10)	Primo Erectio Universitatis ("First, the establishment of the university")	Alexander VI	Foundation of the University of Aberdeen.
1497 (October 15)	Ad sacram ordinis ("To the sacred order")	Alexander VI	The ancient custom of selecting the Prefect of the Apostolic Chapel from the Augustinian Order was given legal foundation.

=== Sixteenth century ===
Year	Bull	Issuer	Description
1500 (June 1)	Quamvis ad amplianda	Alexander VI	Calls for a crusade against the Ottoman Empire in response to Ottoman invasions of Venetian territories in Greece.
1506 (January 24)	Ea quae pro bono pacis	Julius II	Approval of the Treaty of Tordesillas by the Catholic Church
1509 (July 2)	Suspecti Regiminis	Julius II	Declared that anyone appealing a decree or law to a general council was at least suspected of heresy.
1509	Pontifex Romanis Pacis	Julius II	Against plunderers of shipwrecks
1511	Pax Romana ("Roman Peace"/"Peace of Rome")	Julius II	To stop the feuding between the Orsini and Colonna families
1511	Consueverunt	Julius II	
1513 (December 19)	Apostolici Regiminis	Leo X	Concerning the immortality of the soul.
1514 (March 22)	Sincerae devotionis	Leo X	
1514	Precelse denotionis ("Especially the description")	Leo X	Renewed Dum Diversas of 1452
1514	Supernæ dispositionis arbitrio	Leo X	Calls for reform of the curia and declares that cardinals should come immediately after the pope in the ecclesiastical hierarchy.
1515 (May 4)	Regimini Universalis	Leo X	Requires that metropolitan bishops hold a provincial synod every three years.
1515 (May 4)	Inter Multiplices	Leo X	Regulated lending and Usury, especifically by the institution of Monte di Pietà. Published during the Fifth Lateran Council.
1515 (July 19)	Salvatoris Nostri	Leo X	Roman hospitals, S. Maria del Popolo and S. Giacomo and Tridente.
1516 (May 19)	Illius qui in altis habitat	Leo X	Roman hospitals.
1516 (June 16)	De Supernae dispositionis arbitrio	Leo X	Funding of the San Giacomo hospital throughout enfiteusis
1516 (December 19)	Pastor aeternus	Leo X	Declared the Pragmatic Sanction of Bourges null and void.
1517 (May 29)	Ite vos	Leo X	Order of Friars Minor
1518 (November 9)	Cum Postquam	Leo X	Decretal on indulgences
1519	Supremo	Leo X	
1520 (June 15)	Exsurge Domine ("Arise, O Lord")	Leo X	Demands that Martin Luther retract 41 of his 95 theses, as well as other specified errors, within sixty days of its publication in neighbouring regions to Saxony.
1521 (January 3)	Decet Romanum Pontificem ("[It] befits [the] Roman Pontiff")	Leo X	Excommunicates Martin Luther.
1522 (May 10)	Exponi nobis nuper fecisti	Adrian VI	Grants sweeping authority to mendicant orders in the New World
1529 (May 8)	Intra Arcana	Clement VII	Grant of permissions and privileges to Emperor Charles V and the Spanish Empire, which included patronage power over their lands in the Americas.
1533 (April 7)	Sempiterno regi	Clement VII	Partial condemnation of the forced baptism of Portuguese Jews, and general pardon to New Christians.
1533	Romanus Pontifex		
1536 (May 23)	Cum ad nihil magis	Paul III	Introduces Inquisition into Portugal.
1537 (May 29)	Sublimis Deus	Paul III	Forbids the enslavement of the indigenous peoples of the Americas.
1538 (October 28)	In apostolatus culmine	Paul III	
1540 (May 12)	Licet Judæi	Paul III	Against blood libel
1540 (September 27)	Regimini militantis ecclesiae ("To the Government of the Church Militant")	Paul III	Approves the formation of the Society of Jesus.
1542	Cupientes iudaeos	Paul III	Converts from Judaism are guaranteed citizenship at their place of baptism.
1542 (July 21)	Licet ab initio	Paul III	Institution of the Congregation of the Holy Office of the Inquisition.
1543 (March 14)	Injunctum nobis	Paul III	Repealed a clause in the Regimini militantis ecclesiae which had only allowed the Society of Jesus sixty members.
1550 (July 21)	Exposcit debitum ("The Duty demands")	Julius III	Second and final approval of the Society of Jesus
1551 (February 25)	Super specula militantis Ecclesiae ("Upon the watchtower of the Church Militant")	Julius III	Ended the status of Funchal as the largest diocese in the world, creating new bishoprics throughout the Portuguese Empire at Salvador &c.
1553 (April 28)	Divina disponente clementia ("So predisposed by the divine clemency")	Julius III	Create Shimun VIII Yohannan Sulaqa the first patriarch of the Chaldean Catholic Church.
1554 (August 31)	Pastoris æterni vices	Julius III	Imposes tax of ten gold ducats on two out of the 115 synagogues in the Papal States
1555 (June 20)	Praeclara Carissimi	Paul IV	Consisted of two parts. Confirmed the sale of church lands under Henry VIII of England and imposed the reordination of all clerics consecrated during Henry VIII and Edward VI of England.
1555 (July 14)	Cum nimis absurdum ("Since it is absurd")	Paul IV	Places religious and economic restrictions on Jews in the Papal States.
1559 (February 15)	Cum ex apostolatus officio ("By virtue of the apostolic office")	Paul IV	Confirms that only Catholics can be elected Popes.
1559 (May 12)	Super universas ("General")	Paul IV	Created three new archbishoprics and fourteen new bishoprics in the Netherlands.
1560 (January 19)	Ad caritatis et misericordiae opera	Pius IV	Roman hospital of San Giacomo degli Incurabili.
1564	Injunctum nobis	Pius IV	Issued the Tridentine Creed
1564	Dominici Gregis Custodiae	Pius IV	Containing the rules for forbidding books
1564 (January 26)	Benedictus Deus ("Blessed God")	Pius IV	Ratified all decrees and definitions of the Council of Trent.
1565 (January 17)	Æquum reputamus ("We consider it equal")	Pius V	
1566	Cum nobis ex parte	Pius V	Reiterates condemnation of those who plunder shipwrecks
1567	Ex omnibus afflictionibus	Pius V	Condemns 79 statements made by Michael Baius
1567	Etsi Dominici gregis	Pius V	Forbids the sale of Indulgences
1567 (January 19)	Cum nos nuper	Pius V	Orders Jews to sell all property in Papal States
1568 (June 7)	Quod a nobis	Pius V	Modified the Roman Breviary
1569 (February)	Hebraeorum gens sola	Pius V	Restricted Jews in the Papal States to Rome and Ancona.
1569 (February, 14)	Cum onus apostolica servitutis abeuntes ("When the Apostolic burden is gone")	Pius V	Regulated lending and Usury, especifically by way of the census. Another Bull was published with an amendment on the 10th of June, 1570.
1569 (August 27)	Magnus Dux Etruriae	Pius V	Elevated Cosimo I de' Medici to Grand Duke of Tuscany.
1569 (September 17)	Consueverunt Romani Pontifices	Pius V	On the power of the Rosary
1569 (December 21)	"Concerning the primacy of the Lateran"	Pius V	Confirming a decision by the Roman Rota that "the right of precedence...of St. Peter's...should pertain...to the church of the Lateran."
1570 (February 25)	Regnans in excelsis ("Ruling from on high")	Pius V	Declares Elizabeth I of England a heretic and releases her subjects from any allegiance to her.
1570 (July 14)	Quo primum ("From the first")	Pius V	Promulgates the Roman Missal (Tridentine Mass), and forbids use of other Latin liturgical rites that cannot demonstrate two hundred year of continuous use.
1572 (September 16)	Cristiani Populi	Gregory XIII	Foundation of Order of Saints Maurice and Lazarus
1572 (November 13)	Pro Commissa Nobis	Gregory XIII	Dispositions about Order of Saints Maurice and Lazarus
1574	Ad Romani Pontificis	Gregory XIII	
1578 (January 31)	Christianus filius noster Sebastianus	Gregory XIII	
1581 (March 30)	Multos adhuc ex Christianis	Gregory XIII	Renews Church law against Jewish physicians
1581 (June 1)	Antiqua Judæorum improbitas	Gregory XIII	Gives jurisdiction over Jews of Rome to Inquisition in cases of blasphemy, protection of heretics, possession of forbidden works, employment of Christian servants
1582 (February 24)	Inter gravissimas ("Among the most important")	Gregory XIII	Establishes the Gregorian calendar.
1584 (May 24)	Ascendente Domino	Gregory XIII	Confirms the constitution of the Society of Jesus.
1584 (September 1)	Sancta mater ecclesia	Ordered that the gospels be preached in Roman synagogues.	
1586 (January 5)	Coeli et terrae ("The heavens and the lands")	Sixtus V	Condemned divination and judicial astrology.
1586 (October)	Christiana pietas ("Christian piety")	Sixtus V	Allowed Jews to settle in the Papal States, revoking Pius V's 1569 bull, Hebraeorum gens sola.
1588 (February 11)	Immensa Aeterni Dei ("The immense [wisdom] of Eternal God")	Sixtus V	Reorganized the Roman Curia, establishing several permanent congregations to advise the Pope.
1588 (October 29)	Effraenatam ("The unbridled [audacity and daring]") -- a.k.a. Against Those Who Procure	Sixtus V	Declares that the canonical penalty of excommunication would be levied for any form of contraception and for abortion at any stage of fetal development.
1588	Triumphantis Hierusalem	Sixtus V	Officially elevates St. Bonaventure to the status of Doctor of the Church
1591 (March 21)	Cogit nos	Gregory XIV	Threatens all those betting on papal elections, the length of the papacy, and the establishment of cardinals, with excommunication.
1591 (April 18)	Cum Sicuti	Gregory XIV	Decrees the emancipation of all indigenous slaves in the Philippines.
1592 (February 28)	Cum sæpe accidere	Clement VIII	Forbidding Jews to deal in new commodities
1593	Caeca et Obdurata ("The Blind and Obdurate")	Clement VIII	Expelled the Jews from the Papal States.
1593	Pastoralis	Clement VIII	

=== Seventeenth century ===
Year	Bull	Issuer	Description
1603 (February 3)	Dominici gregis	Clement VIII	Marian piety as the basis of the Church. Upheld the perpetual virginity of Mary.
1604 (August 23)		Clement VIII	In favor of Portuguese Maranos
1631	Contra astrologos iudiciarios	Urban VIII	Condemns astrological predictions of the deaths of princes and popes.
1639 (April 22)	Commissum nobis	Urban VIII	Reaffirms "Sublimus Dei" forbidding enslavement of indigenous people
1641 (6 March)	In eminenti Ecclesiae militantis	Urban VIII	Censures Jansenist publications.
1642 (30 January)	Cum Ecclesiae	Urban VIII	Bans the consumption of tobacco in churches.
1644		Urban VIII	Grants pilgrims to the Jesuit mission at Sainte-Marie among the Hurons "a Plenary Indulgence each year and the remission of all their sins."
1653 (May 31)	Cum occasione	Innocent X	Condemns 5 Jansenist propositions.
1658 (Nov. 15)	Ad ea per quae	Alexander VII	Orders Roman Jews to pay rent even for unoccupied houses in ghetto, because Jews would not hire houses from which Jews had been evicted
1659	Super cathedram Principis Apostolorum	Alexander VII	Establishing the Catholic mission in Vietnam
1664	Speculatores domus Israel	Alexander VII	Introducing the new edition of the Index of Forbidden Books
1665	Ad sacram ("To the sacred")	Alexander VII	Confirms bull Cum occasione and further condemns Jansenism
1676 (November 16)	Inter Pastoralis Officii Curas	Innocent XI	Establishes Salvador as independent of Lisbon and as primate over Brazil, Congo, and Angola
1687	Coelestis Pastor	Innocent XI	Condemns Quietism as heresy.
1692	Romanum decet Pontificem ("It befits the Roman Pontiff")	Innocent XII	Abolished the office of Cardinal-Nephew

=== Eighteenth century ===
Year	Bull	Issuer	Description
1713	Unigenitus ("The only-begotten")	Clement XI	Condemns Jansenism.
1715 (Mar. 19)	Ex illa die	Clement XI	Chinese customs and traditions that are not contradictory to Roman Catholicism will be allowed, while ones clearly contradictory to it will not be tolerated.
1737 (Dec. 17)	Inter praecipuas apostolici ministerii ("Among the main attributes of the Apostolate")	Clement XI	Determines that whoever is elected Patriarch of Lisbon is to be elevated to the dignity of cardinal in the first consistory following their election.
1738	In eminenti apostolatus specula ("In the high watchtower of the Apostolate")	Clement XI	Bans Catholics from becoming Freemasons.
1740 (Dec. 13)	Salvatoris nostri Mater ("The Mother of Our Saviour")	Benedict XIV	Suppresses the vacant Metropolitan Archdiocese of Eastern Lisbon and merges it with the Patriarchate of Lisbon; grants the canons of the cathedral chapter the title of Principal.
1741 (Feb. 23)	Apostolicae Servitutis ("Apostolic Servitude")	Benedict XIV	Forbids members of the clergy from engaging in worldly pursuits such as business.
1741 (Dec. 20)	Immensa Pastorum Principis	Benedict XIV	Against the enslavement of the indigenous peoples of the Americas, in particular of Brazil, and of the other places.
1747 (Feb. 28)	Postremo mense ("In the last month of the previous year")	Benedict XIV	Confirms decision of Roman Curia of October 22, 1597, that a Jewish child, once baptized, even against canonical law, must be brought up under Christian influences and removed from its parents.
1751 (Dec. 15)	Probe te meminisse ("You should remember")	Benedict XIV	Authorizes forced baptisms of Jewish children in the Papal States under favor fidei ("favor of faith"), overriding parental rights, with vague exceptions. Children were seized and sent to the House of the Catechumens (Italian: Pia Casa dei Catecumeni), enabling systemic abuses into the 19th century.
1755	Beatus Andreas ("Blessed Andreas")	Benedict XIV	Beatifies child martyr Andreas Oxner, said in a blood libel accusation to have been murdered by Jews in 1462.
1773	Dominus ac Redemptor noster ("Our Master and Redeemer")	Clement XIV	Orders the suppression of the Society of Jesus.
1794 (August 28)	Auctorem Fidei	Pius VI	Condemns the Gallicanism and Jansenism of the Synod of Pistoia.
1799 (Mar. 16)	Saepe factum est ("It is often done")	Pius VI	Creates the Diocese of Wigry.

=== Nineteenth century ===
Year	Bull	Issuer	Description
1809 (June 10)	Quum memoranda	Pius VII	Excommunicated Napoleon Bonaparte and anyone who contributed to the annexation of the Papal States and overthrow of the Holy See's temporal power by the First French Empire
1814	Sollicitudo omnium ecclesiarum ("The care of all the churches")	Pius VII	Reestablishes the Society of Jesus.
1818	Ex imposita nobis	Pius VII	Defined the boundaries of the dioceses in the newly formed Congress Poland.
1824	Quod divina sapientia ("What divine wisdom")	Leo XII	Restructures education in the Papal States under ecclesiastical supervision.
1831	Sollicitudo ecclesiarum	Gregory XVI	That in the event of a change of government, the church would negotiate with the new government for placement of bishops and vacant dioceses.
1850 (September 29)	Universalis Ecclesiae ("Of the Universal Church")	Pius IX	Recreates the Roman Catholic hierarchy in England.
1853 (March 4)	Ex qua die arcano ("From the very day when by the secret [counsels]...")	Pius IX	Reestablishment of the episcopal hierarchy in the Netherlands
1854	Ineffabilis Deus	Pius IX	Defined the dogma of the Immaculate Conception
1866 (July 12)	Reversurus ("To come back")	Pius IX	Extends to the Armenian Catholic Church the Western provisions about appointment of bishops.
1868 (June 29)	Aeterni Patris ("Of the Eternal Father")	Pius IX	Summons First Vatican Council.
1869 (October 12)	Apostolicæ Sedis moderationi ("To the guidance of the Apostolic See")	Pius IX	Regulates the system of censures and reservations in the Catholic Church.
1871	Pastor aeternus ("The eternal shepherd")	Pius IX	Defines papal infallibility.
1880 (July 13)	Dolemus inter alia ("Among other things, we lament")	Leo XIII	Reinstates the privileges of the Society of Jesus (Jesuits), nullifying the bull Dominus ac Redemptor Noster of 21 July 1773.
1884 (November 1)	Omnipotens Deus ("God Almighty")	Leo XIII	Accepted the authenticity of the relics at Compostela, Galicia, Spain.
1896	Apostolicae curae ("Of the Apostolic care")	Leo XIII	Declares all Anglican Holy Orders null and void.

=== Twentieth century ===
Year	Bull	Issuer	Description
1910	Quam singulari ("How special")	Pius X	Allows the admittance of Communion to children who have reached the age of reason (about seven years old).
1930	Ad Christi nomen	Pius XI	Created the Diocese of Vijayapuram.
1949	Jubilaeum Maximum ("Great jubilee")	Pius XII	Announcement of 1950 as a Holy Year
1950 (November 1)	Munificentissimus Deus ("The most bountiful God")	Pius XII	Defines the dogma of the Assumption of Mary.
1961 (December 25)	Humanae salutis ("Of human salvation")	John XXIII	Summons Second Vatican Council.
1998 (November 29)	Incarnationis mysterium ("The mystery of the Incarnation")	John Paul II	Indiction of the Great Jubilee of 2000

=== Twenty-first century ===
Year	Bull	Issuer	Description
2015 (April 11)	Misericordiae vultus ("The Face of Mercy")	Francis	Indiction of a Holy Year: The Extraordinary Jubilee of Mercy 2015–2016
2024 (May 9)	Spes non confundit ("Hope does not disappoint")	Francis	Indiction of the 2025 Jubilee

Also note In Coena Domini ("At the Lord's dinner"), a recurrent papal bull issued annually between 1363 and 1770, at first on Holy Thursday, later on Easter Monday.

== Sources ==
- Anderson, C. Colt (2012). "The Six Errors: Hus on Simony". In Bellitto, Christopher M.; Flanagin, David Zachariah (eds.). Reassessing Reform: A Historical Investigation into Church Renewal. The Catholic University of America Press.
- Bagliani, Agostino Paravincini (2002). "Gregory IX". In Levillain, Philippe (ed.). The Papacy. Vol. 2:Gaius-Proxies. Routledge.
- Bagliani, Agostino Paravincini (2002a). "Honorius III". In Levillain, Philippe (ed.). The Papacy. Vol. 2:Gaius-Proxies. Routledge.
- Bernecker, Walther L.; Herbers, Klaus (2013). Geschichte Portugals. Verlag W. Kohlhammer.
- Biller, Peter; Bruschi, C.; Sneddon, S., eds. (2011). Inquisitors and Heretics in Thirteenth-Century Languedoc: Edition and Translation of Toulouse Inquisition Depositions, 1273-1282. Brill.
- Biller, Peter (2022). "Helping the Poor and Healing the Sick". In Benedetti, Marina; Cameron, Euan (eds.). A Companion to the Waldenses in the Middle Ages. Brill. pp. 422–444.
- Jenks, Stuart, ed. (2018). Documents on the Papal Plenary Indulgences 1300-1517 Preached in the Regnum Teutonicum. Brill. ISBN 9789004360631.
- Marcus, Hannah (2020). Forbidden Knowledge: Medicine, Science, and Censorship in Early Modern Italy. University of Chicago Press. ISBN 9780226736617.
- Maxwell, John Francis (1975). Slavery and the Catholic Church : The history of catholic teaching concerning the moral legitimacy of the institution of slavery. Barry Rose Publishers.
- Nielsen, Torben K. (2016). "Celestine III and the North". In Doran, John; Smith, Damian J. (eds.). Pope Celestine III (1191-1198): Diplomat and Pastor. Routledge. pp. 159–178.
- Oakley, Francis (1985). The Western Church in the Later Middle Ages. Cornell University Press.
- Prudlo, Donald S. (2015). Certain Sainthood: Canonization and the Origins of Papal Infallibility in. Cornell University Press.
- Rothman, E. Natalie (2012). Brokering Empire: Trans-Imperial Subjects Between Venice and Istanbul. Cornell University Press.
- Te Brake, Wayne P. (2017). Religious War and Religious Peace in Early Modern Europe. Cambridge University Press. ISBN 9781316839478.
