= 1481 =

1481 in various calendars
- Gregorian calendar: 1481; MCDLXXXI
- Ab urbe condita: 2234
- Armenian calendar: 930; ԹՎ ՋԼ
- Assyrian calendar: 6231
- Balinese saka calendar: 1402–1403
- Bengali calendar: 887–888
- Berber calendar: 2431
- English Regnal year: 20 Edw. 4 – 21 Edw. 4
- Buddhist calendar: 2025
- Burmese calendar: 843
- Byzantine calendar: 6989–6990
- Chinese calendar: 庚子年 (Metal Rat); 4178 or 3971 — to — 辛丑年 (Metal Ox); 4179 or 3972
- Coptic calendar: 1197–1198
- Discordian calendar: 2647
- Ethiopian calendar: 1473–1474
- Hebrew calendar: 5241–5242
- Hindu calendars
- Vikram Samvat: 1537–1538
- Shaka Samvat: 1402–1403
- Kali Yuga: 4581–4582
- Holocene calendar: 11481
- Igbo calendar: 481–482
- Iranian calendar: 859–860
- Islamic calendar: 885–886
- Japanese calendar: Bunmei 13 (文明１３年)
- Javanese calendar: 1397–1398
- Julian calendar: 1481; MCDLXXXI
- Korean calendar: 3814
- Minguo calendar: 431 before ROC 民前431年
- Nanakshahi calendar: 13
- Thai solar calendar: 2023–2024
- Tibetan calendar: ལྕགས་ཕོ་བྱི་བ་ལོ་ (male Iron-Rat); 1607 or 1226 or 454 — to — ལྕགས་མོ་གླང་ལོ་ (female Iron-Ox); 1608 or 1227 or 455

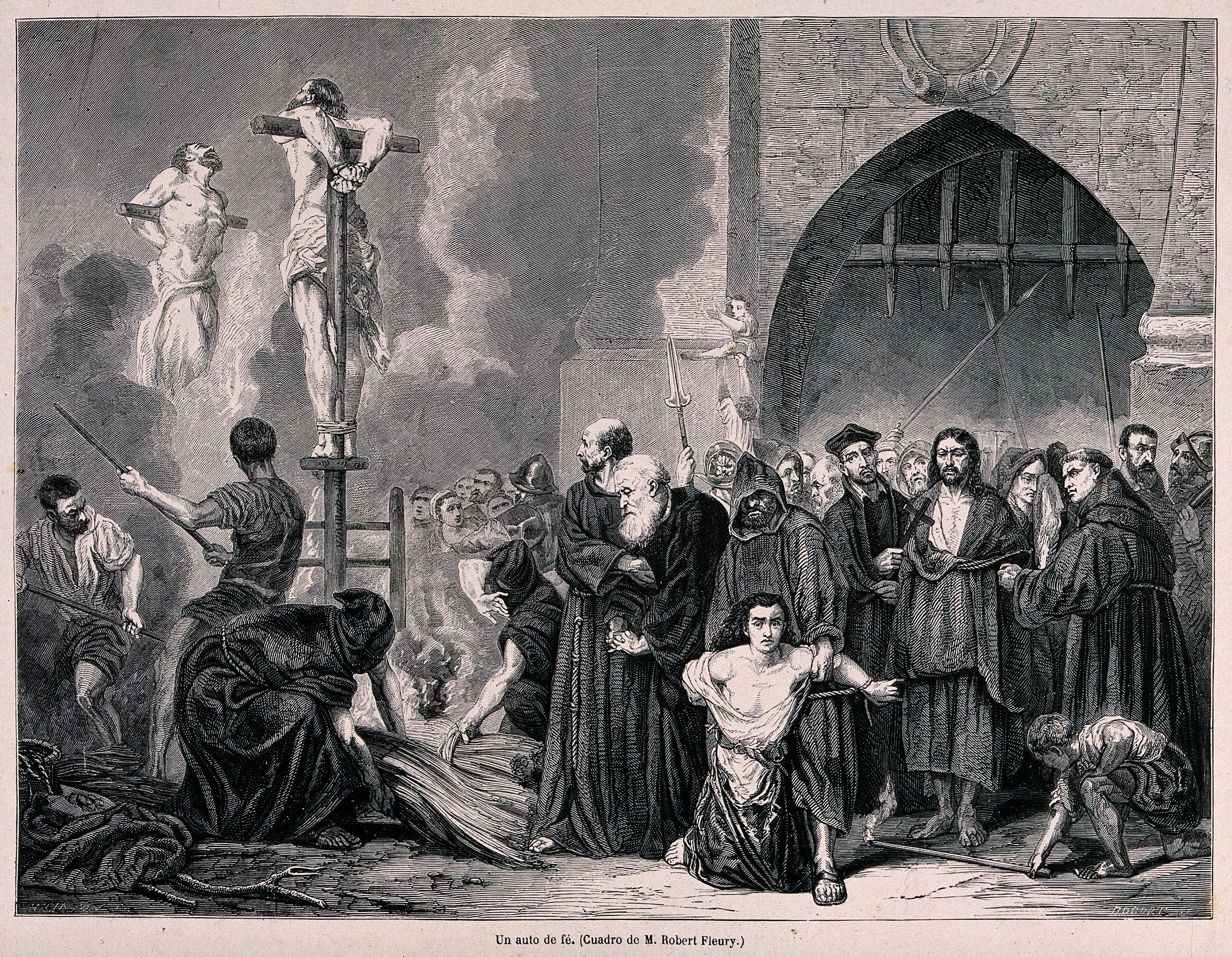
February 6: The first of many uses of the auto-da-fé of the Spanish Inquisition is carried out in the city of Seville as six people are burned alive after being convicted of heresy against the Roman Catholic Church

Year 1481 (MCDLXXXI) was a common year starting on Monday of the Julian calendar.

== Events ==
=== January–March ===
- January 6 – Ahmed Khan bin Küchük, Khan of the Great Horde, is killed by the Khan of Sibir, Ibak Khan in battle and is succeeded by his son, Sheikh Ahmed.
- February 6 – The first execution during the Spanish Inquisition is carried out in Seville in an auto-da-fé as six people convicted of heresy are burned alive. As a result of this and other murders, thousands of conversos— mostly Jewish people who had converted to Christianity— flee their homes.
- March 15 – The first of a series of earthquakes to affect the island of Rhodes occurs, leading up to the deadly earthquake in May.

=== April–June ===
- April 2 – King James III of Scotland gives royal assent to the six Defence of the Realm Acts and to the Benefices Act 1481, passed by his parliament in anticipation of a war with England.
- April 5 – Mahmud Gawan, the chief minister (peshwa) of India's Bahmani Kingdom (now in the state of Karnataka) is executed in Bidar on orders of the Sultan Muhammad Shah III Lashkari, after being falsely convicted of treason. The preparer of the forged document that led to Gawan's overthrow, Malik Hasan Bahri, becomes the new peshwa.
- April 8 – Pope Sixtus IV issues the papal bull Cogimur jubente altissimo, calling for Roman Catholics to participate in a crusade against the Ottoman Empire, starting with the Turkish-occupied southern Italian area in and around Otranto, with the liberation of Valona (now in Albania) to follow.
- May 3
  - The 1481 Rhodes earthquake, the largest of a series, strikes the island of Rhodes, causing an estimated 30,000 casualties.
  - Mehmed II, Sultan of the Ottoman Empire, dies and is succeeded by his son, Bayezid II.
- May 21 – King Christian I of Denmark and Norway dies at the age of 55. Although his eldest son, Prince Hans of Oldenburg, is accepted as the new King of Denmark, the Riksrådet (Council of the Realm) of the Kingdom of Norway postpones its decision pending negotiations to possibly reunite with the Kingdom of Sweden.
- June 21 – The papal bull Aeterni Regis grants Portugal first option to all newly conquered African and Asian lands south of the Canary Islands to Portugal.

=== July–September ===
- July 24 – Fire destroys the roof and the spires of Reims Cathedral.
- August 29 – John II of Portugal starts to rule in his own right.
- September 10 – Alphonso II of Naples recaptures the city of Otranto.

=== October–December ===
- October 13 – The bodies of the Martyrs of Otranto, who had been killed in Italy in 1480 by the Ottomans who had conquered the city of Otranto, are discovered in the city's cathedral "uncorrupted", and the group as a whole is celebrated as martyrs to the Roman Catholic faith. The 813 martyrs will be canonized more than 500 years later on May 12, 2013.
- November 16 – At Târgoviște, Basarab Țepeluș cel Tânăr replaces his successor, Vlad Călugărul as the voivode (prince) of Wallachia (now part of Romania)
- December 10 – With the death of Duke Charles IV of Anjou, Anjou reverts to the French crown under Louis XI, as does the Provence, which until then was part of the Holy Roman Empire.
- December 14 – Ayas Pasha, the Ottoman Empire's sanjak of Bosnia, captures the city of Herceg Novi after a month-long siege when the Duke Vlatko Hercegović agrees to surrender.
- December 22 – The Canton of Fribourg and the Canton of Solothurn are admitted as cantons of Switzerland by the Swiss Confedderation
- December 26 – At the Battle of Westbroek, Holland defeats the troops of Utrecht.
- December 28 – The city of Zahara de la Sierra, now part of Spain, is captured by the Moorish Emir Abu'l-Hasan Ali of Granada in a surprise attack, leading to a counterattack by the Kingdom of Castile two months later.

=== Date unknown ===
- Constitució de l'Observança passed by the General Court of Catalonia (parliament), establishing the submission of royal power to the laws of the Principality of Catalonia.
- Axayacatl, Aztec ruler of Tenochtitlan, dies and is succeeded by his brother Tízoc.
- The Aztec Calendar Stone or Sun Stone is carved.

== Births ==
- January 15 – Ashikaga Yoshizumi, Japanese shōgun (d. 1511)
- March 2 – Franz von Sickingen, German knight (d. 1523)
- March 7 – Baldassare Peruzzi, Italian architect and painter (d. 1536)
- May 3 – Juana de la Cruz Vázquez Gutiérrez, Spanish abbess of the Franciscan Third Order Regular (d. 1534)
- May 14 – Ruprecht of the Palatinate, German bishop (d. 1504)
- July 1 – King Christian II of Denmark, Scandinavian monarch under the Kalmar Union (d. 1559)
- August 21 – Jorge de Lencastre, Duke of Coimbra (d. 1550)
- August 28 – Francisco de Sá de Miranda, Portuguese poet (d. 1558)
- November 11 – Christoph von Scheurl, German writer (d. 1542)
- December 18 – Sophie of Mecklenburg, Duchess of Mecklenburg, Duchess of Saxony (d. 1503)
- December 27 – Casimir, Margrave of Brandenburg-Bayreuth, Margrave of Bayreuth (d. 1527)
- date unknown
  - Yan Song, Chinese prime minister (d. 1568)
  - Antonio de Guevara, Spanish chronicler and moralist (d. 1545)
  - Imperia La Divina, Roman courtesan (d. 1512)

== Deaths ==
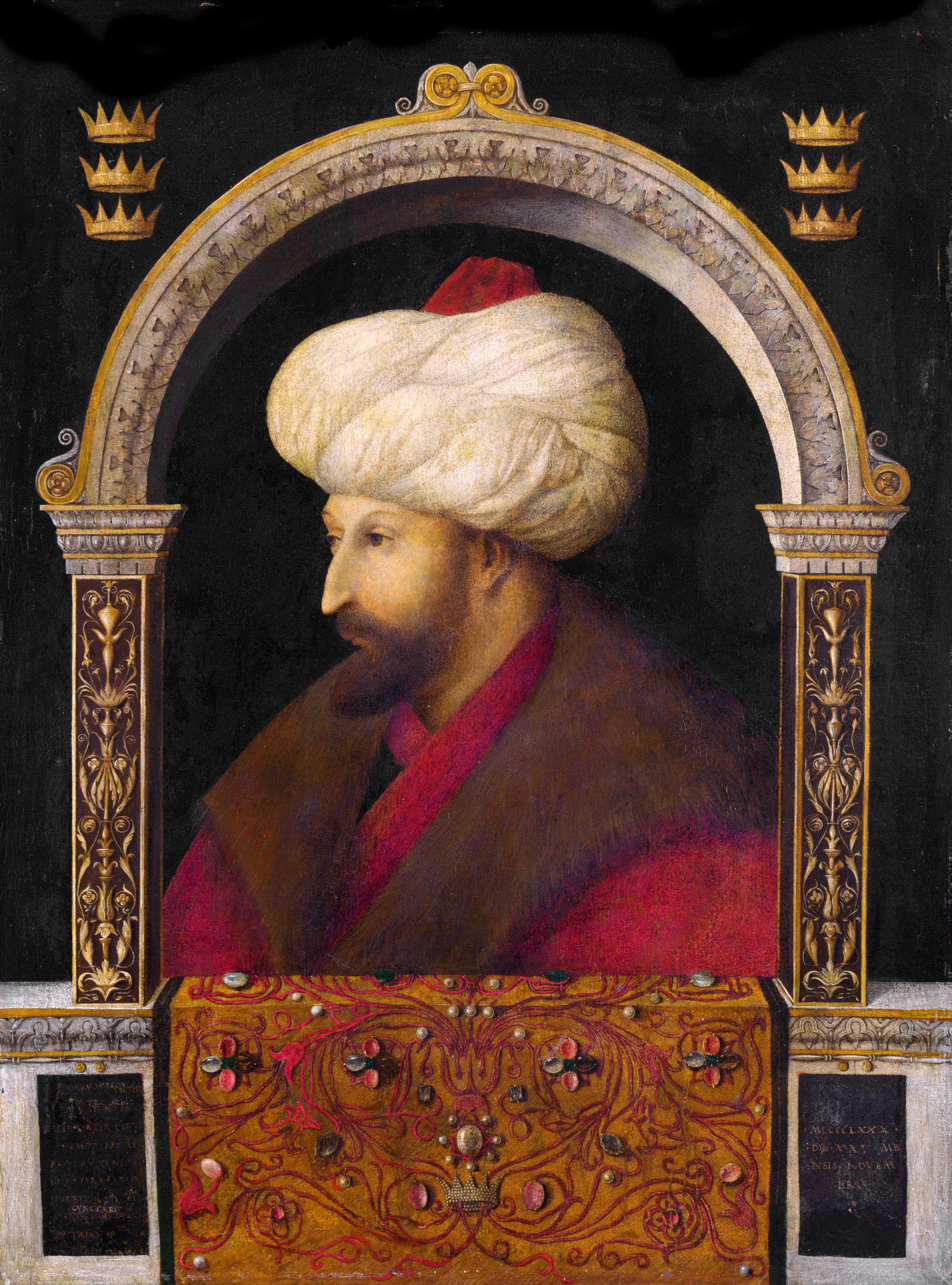
Mehmed II, the Conqueror

- January 6 – Akhmat Khan, khan of the Great Horde
- April 30 – Ichijō Kaneyoshi, Japanese court noble (b. 1402)
- May 3 – Mehmed II, Ottoman Sultan (b. 1432)
- May – Karamanlı Mehmet Pasha, Ottoman (Turkish) grand vizier
- May 21 – King Christian I of Denmark and Norway (b. 1426)
- August 23 – Thomas de Littleton, English judge and legal author (b. c. 1407)
- August 28 – King Afonso V of Portugal (b. 1432)
- September 3 – Amalie of Brandenburg, Countess Palatine and Duchess of Zweibruecken and Veldenz (b. 1461)
- September 5 – John I, Duke of Cleves (b. 1419)
- November 19 – Anne de Mowbray, 8th Countess of Norfolk (b. 1472)
- date unknown
  - Axayacatl, Aztec ruler of Tenochtitlan (b. c. 1449)
  - Duke Charles IV of Anjou, titular King of Naples (b. 1436)
  - Jean Fouquet, French painter (b. 1420)
  - Ikkyu, Japanese Zen Buddhist priest and poet (b. 1394)
  - Mary Woodville, English noblewoman (b. c. 1454)
  - Erik Axelsson Tott, regent of Sweden (b. 1415)
