= Crusade bull =

Papal bull authorizing a crusade

A crusade bull or crusading bull (Latin: bulla cruciata) was a papal bull that granted privileges, including indulgences, to those who took part in the Crusades against infidels. A bull is an official document issued by a pope and sealed with a leaden bulla. All crusade bulls were written in Latin. Those launching a new general crusade were encyclicals addressed to all the archbishops of the Latin Church.

Bulls were not the only means by which popes organized crusades. Many types of papal letters without the bulla attached were issued to arrange, guide and direct crusading efforts. The bulls issued for the Reconquista ('reconquest') in the Iberian Peninsula evolved into something distinct. By the modern period, the "bull of the crusade" (Spanish: bula de la cruzada, Portuguese: bula da cruzada) was used by Spanish and Portuguese monarchs as a means of raising money through donations for various projects, not necessarily military. This system was finally abolished in 1966.

== Early privileges ==
Privileges for just wars against infidels have a long history before the first formal crusade bull. In 1063, Alexander II granted privileges to those who took part in the campaigns of reconquest of King Ramiro I of Aragon. Urban II made similar concessions to Counts Ramon Berenguer III of Barcelona and Ermengol IV of Urgell in 1089 at the time of the reconquest of Tarragona.

Urban II may have been inspired by these concessions when he offered an indulgence to those who joined the First Crusade in 1095. Callistus II renewed Urban's indulgence for crusaders at the First Lateran Council in 1123. Not all early crusades were sanctioned by papal bulls. The Crusade of 1129 was organized by secular leaders and lacked papal authorization, but was nonetheless regarded as a crusade like any other at the time.

== History ==
=== Holy Land ===
The first true crusade bull was Quantum praedecessores, issued by Eugene III for the Second Crusade in 1145. It became the model for later bulls. Gregory VIII launched the Third Crusade in 1187 with the bull Audita tremendi. The Fourth Crusade grew out of two bulls issued by Innocent III in 1198 and 1199, which innovated new means of raising funds. in 1213 Pope Innocent III issued Quia maior which launched the Fifth Crusade. In 1245, Innocent IV issued Terra Sancta Christi which sparked the Seventh Crusade. By the 13th century, the bull was the defining mark of a true crusade. Canon lawyers did not regard vows taken for unauthorized expeditions (the popular crusades) as binding.

=== Iberian peninsula ===
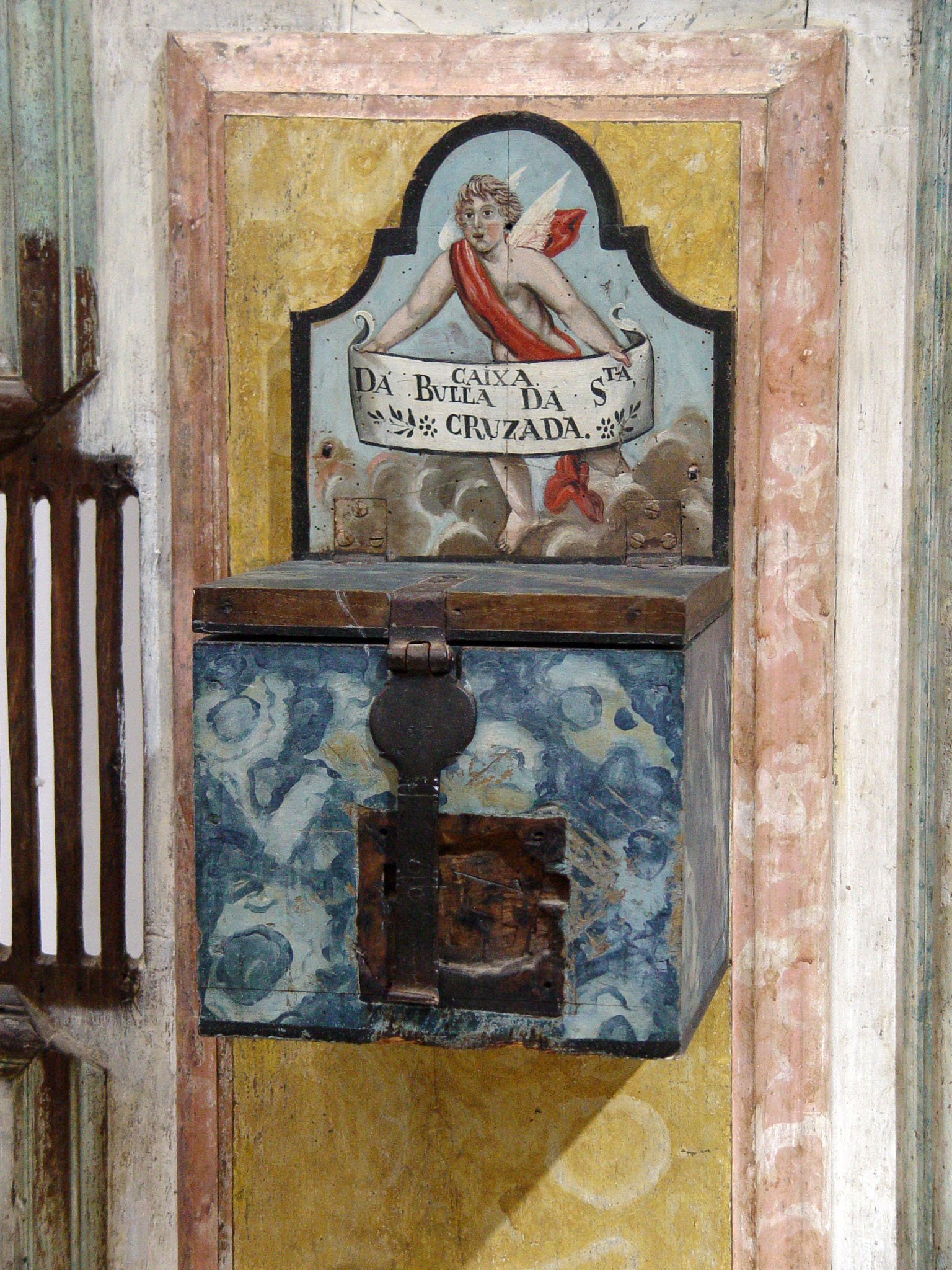
An old alms box at the Monastery of Santa Maria de Pombeiro, Portugal, set aside towards the Bull of the Crusade

In 1118, Gelasius II renewed Urban II's privilege for Alfonso the Battler, when he undertook to reconquer Zaragoza. These grants were renewed again by Callistus II (c. 1123), Eugene III (1152) and Innocent III (1212).

In 1197, Celestine III issued Cum auctores et factores, the first crusade bull bestowed on Portugal, granting indulgences to those who fought the excommunicated Alfonso IX of León for having allied himself with the Almohads. Clement IV in 1265 issued a general Bull for the whole of Spain, when the Kings of Aragon and Castile joined in the expedition against Murcia. In the course of time these pontifical concessions became more and more frequent; in the reign of the Catholic Monarchs alone they were granted in 1478, 1479, 1481, 1482, 1485, 1494, 1503 and 1505, and were continued during succeeding reigns, The one granted by Gregory XIII in 1573 being renewed by his successors.

The alms given by the faithful in response to this bull, which were at first used exclusively for carrying on the war against the 'infidel' Moors, were afterwards used for the construction and repair of churches and other pious works; sometimes they were also used to defray expenses of the State. The Cortes (estates assembly) of Valladolid of 1523 and that of Madrid of 1592 petitioned that this money should not be used for any other purpose than that for which it had originally been intended by the donors, but, notwithstanding the provisions made by Philip III of Spain in compliance with this request, the abuse already mentioned continued. As an example, in the 1740s, the governor of Oran, a Spanish outpost on Algeria, insistently requested that, while the bull sustained the Spanish presence, the acquisition and maintenance of dromedaries for the Royal Palace of Aranjuez had to be funded from a different source. After 1847 the funds derived from this source were devoted to the endowment of churches and the clergy, this disposition being ratified by a law in 1849 and in the Concordat of 1851.

In virtue of the concessions granted by this bull, the faithful of the Spanish dominions who had fulfilled the necessary conditions could gain the plenary indulgence, granted to those who fought for the reconquest of the Holy Land and to those who went to Rome in the year of Jubilee, provided they went to confession and received Holy Communion. They were also absolved twice of sins and censures reserved to the Holy See and the ordinary, except open heresy—and others concerning ecclesiastics, to have vows that could not be fulfilled without difficulty commuted by their confessor—unless failure to fulfill them would be to the disadvantage of another; also simple vows of perpetual chastity, of religious profession and of pilgrimage to the Holy Land. Those who visited five churches or altars, or the same altar five times, and prayed for the intentions of the Crusade, could gain the indulgences granted to those who visited the stations in Rome. The Bull also permitted the faithful of the Spanish dominions to eat meat on all the days of Lent and other days of fast and abstinence, except Ash Wednesday, the Fridays of Lent, the last four days of Holy Week and the vigils of the feasts of the Nativity, Pentecost, the Assumption and Saints Peter and Paul.

=== Northern Crusades ===
The bull Non parum animus noster (Latin for "Our mind is deeply [troubled]") issued by Pope Alexander III in 1171 or 1172 was instrumental in promoting the Northern Crusades against the then pagan Estonians and Finns. In the bull, Alexander III promised an indulgence and one year's remission of sin to those who fought the pagans. Those who died in this crusade would receive full indulgence.
