= Cum saepe accidere =

1592 papal bull of Pope Clement VIII concerning Jewish merchants in Avignon

Cum saepe accidere (In Latin: "As often happens") was a papal bull issued by Pope Clement VIII on 28 February 1592 concerning the commercial activities of the Jewish community of Avignon, then a possession of the Papal States. The decree prohibited Jewish merchants from selling "new merchandise", restricting them largely to trade in used goods.

The measure formed part of a broader renewal of restrictive papal regulation toward Jewish communities during the pontificate of Clement VIII. It followed the reign of Pope Sixtus V (1585–1590), during which some earlier restrictions affecting Jews in papal territories had been relaxed.

== Background ==
Avignon and the surrounding Comtat Venaissin remained under papal sovereignty from the Middle Ages until the French Revolution. Although surrounded by French territory, these areas were governed by papal authorities, and their Jewish communities were subject to regulations issued by the Holy See.

The Jewish community of Avignon was one of several Jewish communities living under papal rule. Like other Jewish communities in papal territories, it was subject to regulations concerning residence, commerce, and religious life.

Papal regulation of Jewish life intensified during the early modern period. In 1555, Pope Paul IV issued the bull Cum nimis absurdum, establishing the Roman Ghetto and imposing restrictions on Jewish residence, occupations, and religious practice in the Papal States.

During the pontificate of Sixtus V, some restrictions were moderated and Jewish communities in papal territories experienced a comparatively less restrictive period. Clement VIII, elected in 1592, adopted a stricter approach toward Jewish policy.

== Contents ==
Cum saepe accidere prohibited Jews in Avignon from trading in new goods. The measure restricted Jewish merchants primarily to the sale of used merchandise and limited their participation in certain areas of retail commerce.

The decree reflected broader economic restrictions imposed on Jewish communities in early modern Catholic Europe. Such regulations often narrowed the occupations available to Jews and shaped patterns of economic activity within Jewish communities.

== Relationship to later legislation ==
Cum saepe accidere was one of several restrictive measures affecting Jewish communities issued during Clement VIII's pontificate. In 1593, the pope issued Caeca et obdurata Hebraeorum perfidia, which renewed restrictions on Jewish life in the Papal States and ordered the expulsion of Jews from most papal territories, while maintaining exceptions for places including Rome and Ancona.

Together, these measures represented a renewed tightening of papal regulation of Jewish communities during the period of the Counter-Reformation.

== Historical significance ==
By restricting Jewish merchants in Avignon to trade in used goods, Cum saepe accidere reduced the economic opportunities available to Jews under papal rule. Similar restrictions elsewhere in Europe contributed to occupational patterns among Jewish communities, as legal limitations narrowed the range of permitted economic activities.

Historians generally interpret such regulations as part of a wider system of legal and social restrictions imposed on Jews in early modern Catholic Europe.

== See also ==
- Cum nimis absurdum
- Christian anti-Judaism
- List of papal bulls
