= Ad summi apostolatus apicem =

15th-century papal bull

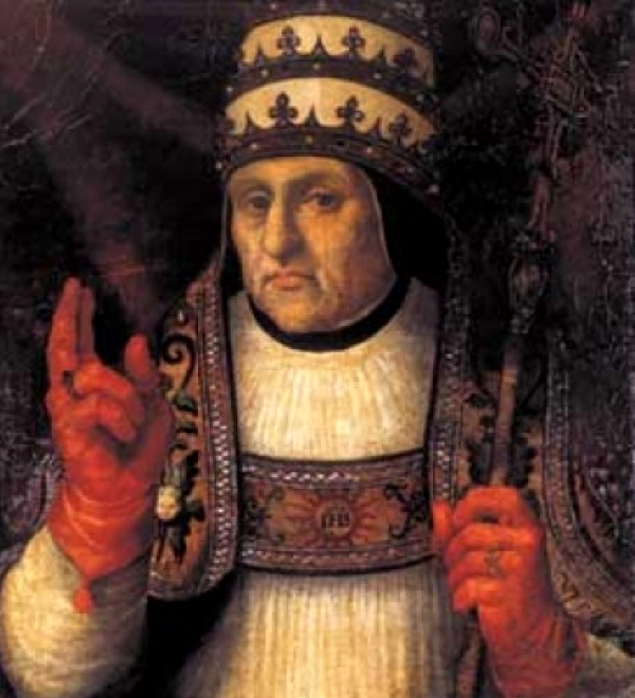
Pope Callixtus III

Ad summi apostolatus apicem is a papal bull issued by Pope Callixtus III on 15 May 1455. Callixtus renewed the indulgences granted by Pope Nicholas V's bull Etsi ecclesia Christi to those who took part in the crusade against the Ottoman Empire. He also regulated the tithes necessary to fund it and set 1 March 1456, as the date for the departure of the crusading expedition.
