= Veram semper et solidam =

1458 papal bull by Pope Pius II

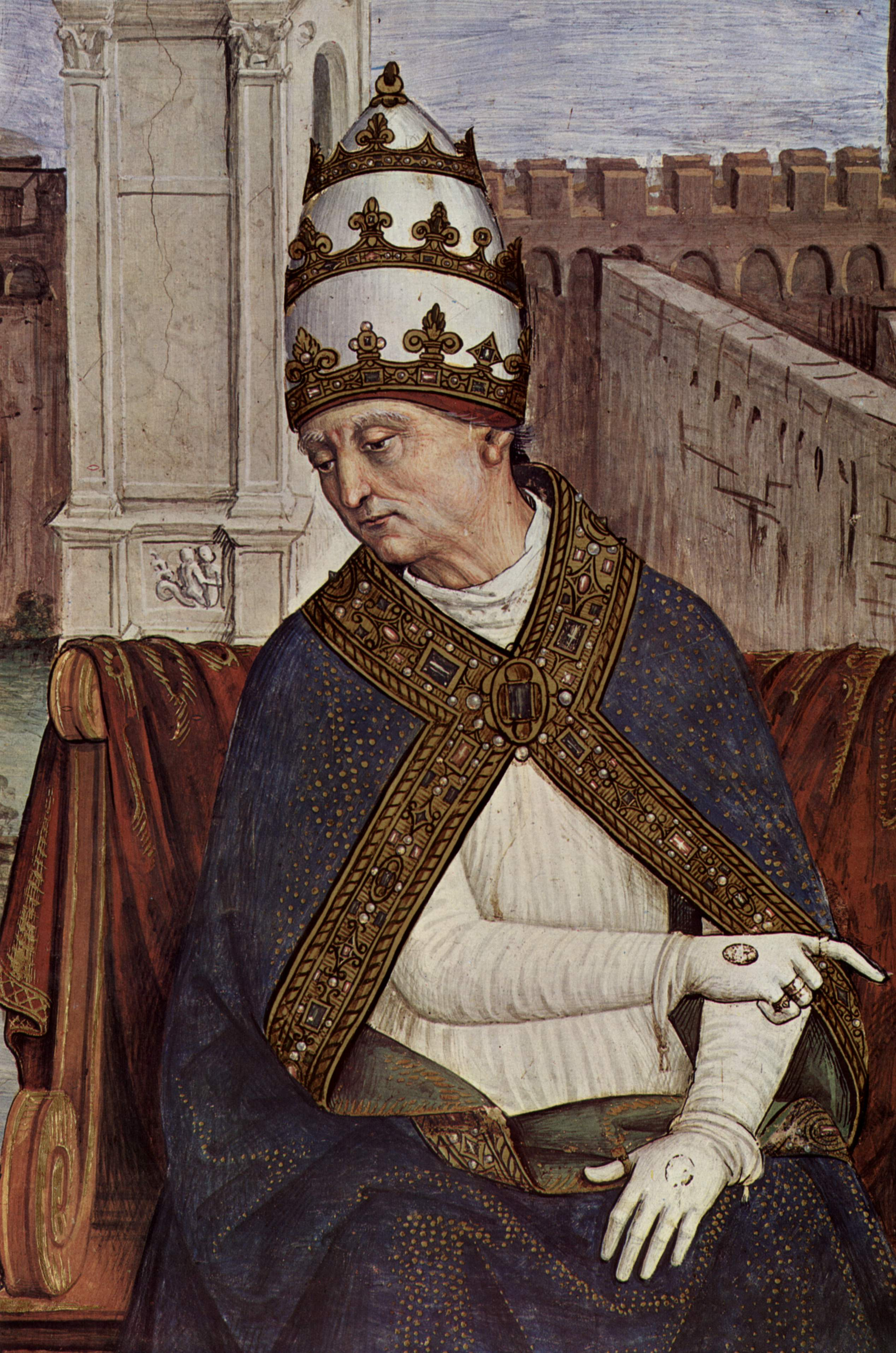
Pope Pius II

Veram semper et solidam is a papal bull issued by Pope Pius II in 1458.

Due to the increasing naval strength of the Ottoman Empire, Pius, in this bull, founded a new religious order of knights to protect the Christians in Greek waters. They were to be modelled on the Knights Hospitaller and to be called the Order of Our Lady of Bethlehem, with their headquarters on Lemnos. However, it is not known if this order ever came into existence.
