= Intra Arcana =

1529 papal bull on Spanish colonization of the Americas

Intra Arcana is a papal bull of Clement VII promulgated on May 8, 1529. This document was addressed specifically to the ruler of the Holy Roman Empire and the Spanish Empire, Charles V. In keeping with the power previously given by the papacy to his predecessor, Ferdinand II, the bull conceded to Charles V the power of patronage in the newly discovered lands in the Americas; this confirmed the ecclesiastical and territorial rights of Spain, including the jurisdiction to decide ecclesiastical lawsuits and the ability to name officials to canonries, prebends, and parsonships.

== Content ==
Intra Arcana was intended to be a grant of permissions and privileges to Emperor Charles V and the Spanish Empire, which included patronage power over their lands in the Americas. Accordingly, there are mentions in the bull of bringing these peoples to the knowledge of the Christian God, as well as permission to govern the new territory with the use of arms, if necessary:

We trust that, as long as you are on earth, you will compel and with all zeal cause the barbarian nations to come to the knowledge of God, the maker and founder of all things, not only by edicts and admonitions, but also by force and arms, if needful, in order that their souls may partake of the heavenly kingdom.

This portion of the text appears to put Clement VII at odds with other leading Catholic thinkers of the age, who emphasized protection of the Indians, especially Pope Paul III. This has led to criticism that Clement VII and the Catholic Church supported a militaristic means of conversion. However, by confirming the emperor's power to compel the Indians with edicts, admonitions, forces, and arms, Intra Arcana supported the emperor's political rights as well as his rights of conquest and colonization. Intra Arcana indicates that the emperor's compulsory powers were to be used to bring about the salvation of souls. This does not imply that conversions were to be forced, which was forbidden by Canon Law. In addition, Clement VII also granted Charles V the authority to recruit priests and other religious to the Spanish colonies. If these priests and religious decided to accept the nominations given by Charles V to these roles in the Americas, the Pope would then absolve any excommunication, suspension, interdict, or other ecclesiastical censure incurred by said priest or religious.

== See also ==
- List of papal bulls
- Catholic Church and the Age of Discovery
