= Quod divina sapientia =

1824 papal bull by Pope Leo XII

The papal bull Quod Divina Sapientia, issued by Pope Leo XII 28 August 1824, organised all public instruction in the Papal States under ecclesiastical supervision. Ancient autonomies of the old universities were abolished, streamlining their hierarchies, a progressive move, but placing them under the immediate supervision of the Pontifical state by means of a congregation of cardinals that was to function in essence as a ministry of public education, with, among its duties, the prerogative of selecting professors to fill established university chairs. Cardinal Wiseman observed approvingly that to the Congregation "belongs the duty of approving, correcting, or rejecting, changes suggested by the different faculties; of filling up vacancies in chairs; and watching over the discipline, morals and principles of all the universities and other schools." Cardinal Wiseman notes that professorships were thrown open in public competition, open to "such competitors as had sent in satisfactory testimonials of character." An exception to open competition was made in the case of those who had published a work that would sufficiently attest to its author's competency. The nihil obstat for publication served as a first control against unacceptable opinions in print, sanctioned by an imprimatur.

Cardinal Francesco Bertazzoli, examiner of bishops in theology, was immediately appointed prefect; Bartazzoli had headed the commission of cardinals examining prospects for reforming the pontifical universities.

Scientific courses at the University of Perugia were brought under the Faculty of Philosophy, where they could be monitored in detail. Unsupervised instruction was forbidden; at Viterbo, the courses being given at the Ospedale Grande degli Infermi were interrupted under the provisions of Quod Divina Sapientia, when ecclesiastical officials forced the hospital to limit its activities to the treatment of patients.

With the Unification of Italy, a series of decrees by Vittorio Emanuele, 1860-62 freed the universities in the former States of the Church from ecclesiastical supervision.

== See also ==
- List of papal bulls
