= Quia maior =

1213 letter by Pope Innocent III

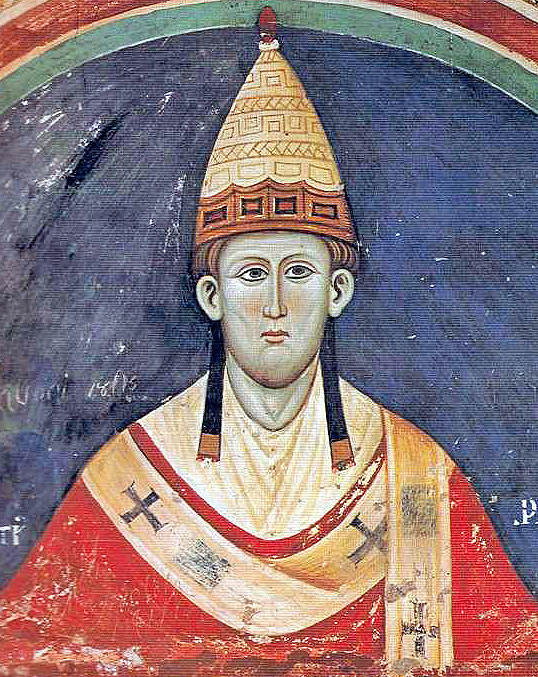
The author of Quia maior, Pope Innocent III

Quia maior is a papal bull issued by Pope Innocent III in April 1213. In it, Innocent presents crusading as a moral obligation for all Christians and lays out his plan to recapture Jerusalem and the rest of the Holy Land from the Muslims. The longest of the three crusade-related letters that Innocent issued in the same month, it laid the foundation for the Fifth Crusade, which was formally approved by the Fourth Lateran Council in November 1215. Quia maior has since been recognised by historians as one of the most important medieval papal bulls on crusading.

== Publication history ==
Quia maior is often referred to as a bull, specifically a crusade bull, although the term "bull" was only introduced in the fifteenth century and technically refers to the bulla or seal attached to the base of the letter, rather than the letter itself.

A draft version of the letter, titled Quoniam maior, is collected in the Chronicle of Burchard of Ursperg (compiled in 1229 or 1230). The final version of Quia maior was issued by Pope Innocent III between 19 and 29 April 1213, as part of his campaign to rally all Christians to join another crusade. Innocent himself was particularly influenced by the writings of Bernard of Clairvaux, whose emphasis on the connection between salvation and military service to Christ is echoed in Quia maior.

Copies of the letter were sent to Ancona, Bohemia, Bremen, Calabria, Cologne, Dalmatia, England, France, Genoa, Hungary, Ireland, Lund, Mainz, Milan, Norway, Poland, Ravenna, Salzburg, Sardinia, Scotland, Sweden, Trier, and Tuscany. In his later correspondence with several German clerics, Innocent urged them to "pass on with great care and attention to detail exactly what is contained in the encyclical".

In addition to Quia maior, Innocent wrote two other shorter crusade-related letters that were also sent out to nearly all the ecclesiastical provinces in Europe in the same month, titled Pium et sanctum and Vineam Domini. The Fifth Crusade was formally approved by the Fourth Council of the Lateran some two years later in November 1215. However, there are significant differences between the crusade plan in Quia maior and the council's decree, titled Ad liberandum. For instance, the revocation of indulgences for those involved in the Albigensian Crusade, as set forth in Innocent's 1213 letter, is instead replaced by an affirmation of their vows in Ad liberandum.

== Content ==
Written in Latin, the letter begins with the words "Quia maior...". The opening section invokes Matthew 16:24 and its call for the followers of Jesus Christ to "take up the cross". Innocent claims that crusading offers an opportunity for spiritual restoration, since it is an "ancient expedient of Jesus Christ for the salvation of his faithful which he has designed to renew in these days". Moreover, Innocent asserts that "since nothing can resist His will", God could have chosen to recapture Jerusalem by divine fiat, but chose to present Christians with a test of faith instead. Conversely, refusal to support the crusade will result in one's damnation during the Last Judgment.

Innocent notes that the Holy Land had belonged to Christians prior to the rise of Islam. He identifies Muhammad as a "pseudoprophet" and the "beast of the apocalypse". However, encouraged by the outcome of the Battle of Las Navas de Tolosa, and believing the "number of the beast" (666) to be the number of years since Muhammad's migration from Mecca to Medina in 622 (almost 600 years prior), Innocent argues that the time has come to launch a crusade against the Muslims. Christians are obliged to liberate their fellow believers who are "held in the hands of the perfidious Saracens in dire imprisonment". Furthermore, the Crusader states are under direct threat from the Muslims' continued presence in Mount Tabor, from which "they may be able to occupy the nearby city of Acre quite easily and then, without any resistance, invade the rest of this land".

Innocent promises the remission of sins to both participants of the Holy Land crusade as well as those who were unable to crusade in person but "redeemed their vows through a cash payment". These people should also be exempt from paying interest on all their loans; Innocent "recommends to secular authorities" that Jewish moneylenders should be "compelled" to follow this ruling. In order to supplement the voluntary war effort, Innocent appeals for secular authorities to provide "an agreed number of warriors with necessary expenses for three years" and coastal cities to provide naval support.

On the other hand, those crusading in Spain (as part of the Reconquista) and southern France (the battleground of the Albigensian Crusade) would have their indulgences revoked, unless they were native to the regions. Taking guidance from a canon passed by the Third Council of the Lateran, Innocent prohibits Christians from selling weapons, iron, or wood to Muslims, as well as engaging in piracy against Muslims.

The encyclical lists several practical objectives that should be met prior to the crusade, such as the appointment of crusade preachers and the organisation of monthly prayers and separate penitential processions for men and women. There is no mention of a crusading tax, but Innocent introduces guidelines for the collection of "freewill offerings" in churches. Quia maior also mandates the daily singing of Psalms 69 and 79 (68 and 78 in the Vulgate) at Mass, which would be accompanied by the celebrating priest's recitation of a crusade-themed prayer titled Deus quis admirabili.

== Legacy ==
Quia maior has been frequently cited by historians as one of the most important medieval papal encyclicals on crusading. According to Thomas W. Smith, it "represents a keystone in our understanding of how the papacy organized and engaged with the crusading movement in the thirteenth century". Christopher Tyerman described it as Innocent's "great crusade encyclical", while J. A. Watt argued that it was the "classical papal document of crusading exhortation".

== See also ==
- List of papal bulls
