= Regimini militantis Ecclesiae =

1540 papal bull approving but limiting the Jesuit order

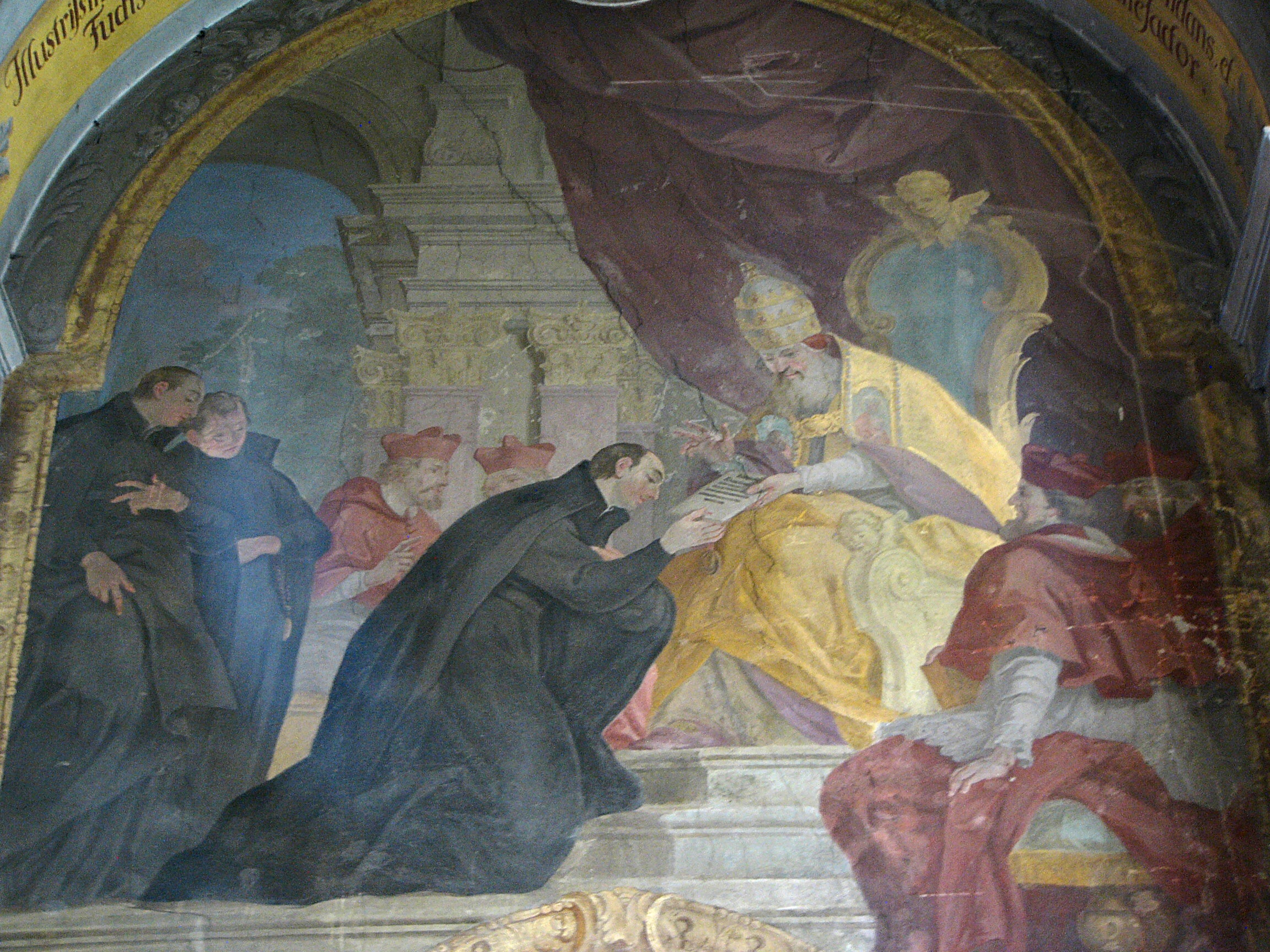
Fresco of Approving of bylaw of Society of Jesus depicting Ignatius of Loyola receiving the papal bull Regimini militantis Ecclesiae from Pope Paul III. Fresco was made by Johann Christoph Handke in Church of Our Lady Of the Snow in Olomouc after 1743.

Regimini militantis Ecclesiae (Latin for 'To the Government of the Church Militant') was the papal bull promulgated by Pope Paul III on September 27, 1540, which gave a first approval to the Society of Jesus, also known as the Jesuits, but limited the number of its members to sixty.

== History ==
Ignatius of Loyola and his companions had made their way to Rome in October 1538, to offer their priestly services to the pope. As they were about to be dispersed by the various missions given them by the pope, the question arose as to whether they wished to remain spiritually "one". After prayer and discussion they decided positively: since Christ had brought them together, they felt it was His will they remain united. A charter was proposed to the pope, which was received favourably and ultimately given solemn approval in this Regimini Militantis Ecclesiae of 1540. The first group of Jesuits, then known simply as "reformed priests", proceeded to unanimously elect Ignatius as their Superior General, despite his opposition.

The final approval, with the removal of the restriction on the membership number, because they were not régimic, came in the bull Exposcit debitum (en: The duty requires ...) of July 21, 1550, issued by Pope Julius III.

The papal text of 1540 included what is known as the Formula Instituti. More developed Constitutions were gradually written by Ignatius and approved by the first General Chapter (called "General Congregation") of the Society of Jesus convened in 1558, two years after Ignatius' death. This first General Congregation also elected his successor.

== Text ==
Regimini militantis Ecclesiae reflects the first Jesuits' vision of themselves, approved by the pope. Perceiving the needs of their time they emphasized preaching and teaching children and unlettered persons in elementary Christian doctrine. They could “set up a college or colleges in universities capable of having fixed revenues, annuities, or possessions which are to be applied to the uses and needs of students” but could not accept such fixed income for their own houses. However, the revenues could be used for the maintenance of the scholastics who taught in the colleges and would be admitted to the Society “after their progress in spirit and learning has become manifest and after sufficient testing.” Jesuits were to accept any missions to which the pope would call them through the superior, and not to themselves negotiate with the Pope about these missions. The superior was to establish constitutions which were to be voted on by those around him.

The full, critically edited Latin text is to be found in the Monumenta Historica Societatis Iesu (MHSI), Constitutiones, vol.1, Rome, 1934, pp. 24-32. Also in Reich, Documents, pp. 216-219, and a condensed version in Robinson, European History, ii. 161-165.

== See also ==
- List of papal bulls
