= Turbato corde =

1267 papal bull barring Christian conversion to Judaism

Turbato corde is a papal bull issued by Clement IV. The bull was addressed to Dominican and Franciscan Friars on the issue of the arising of acts of heresy amongst the mixed Jewish and Christian peoples, expressing the then pope's dissatisfaction and disagreement with there being some Jews attempting to convert Christians to Judaism. The bull was issued during 1267. As part of the address the then pope indicated the friars might be made into inquisitors for the purposes of dealing with suspected acts of heresy. People of the Christian faith and belief who had converted to Judaism were, according to the decree, to be thought of and treated as heretics.

== See also ==
- List of papal bulls
