= Omnipotens Deus =

Omnipotens Deus, Latin for "Almighty God", may refer to:

- Omnipotens Deus, 1517 papal bull
- Omnipotens Deus, 1884 papal bull
- Omnipotens Deus, a common Latin translation of El Shaddai, a name for God in Judaism

== See also ==
- God Almighty (disambiguation)
