= Universo pene orbi =

1487 papal bull by Pope Innocent VIII

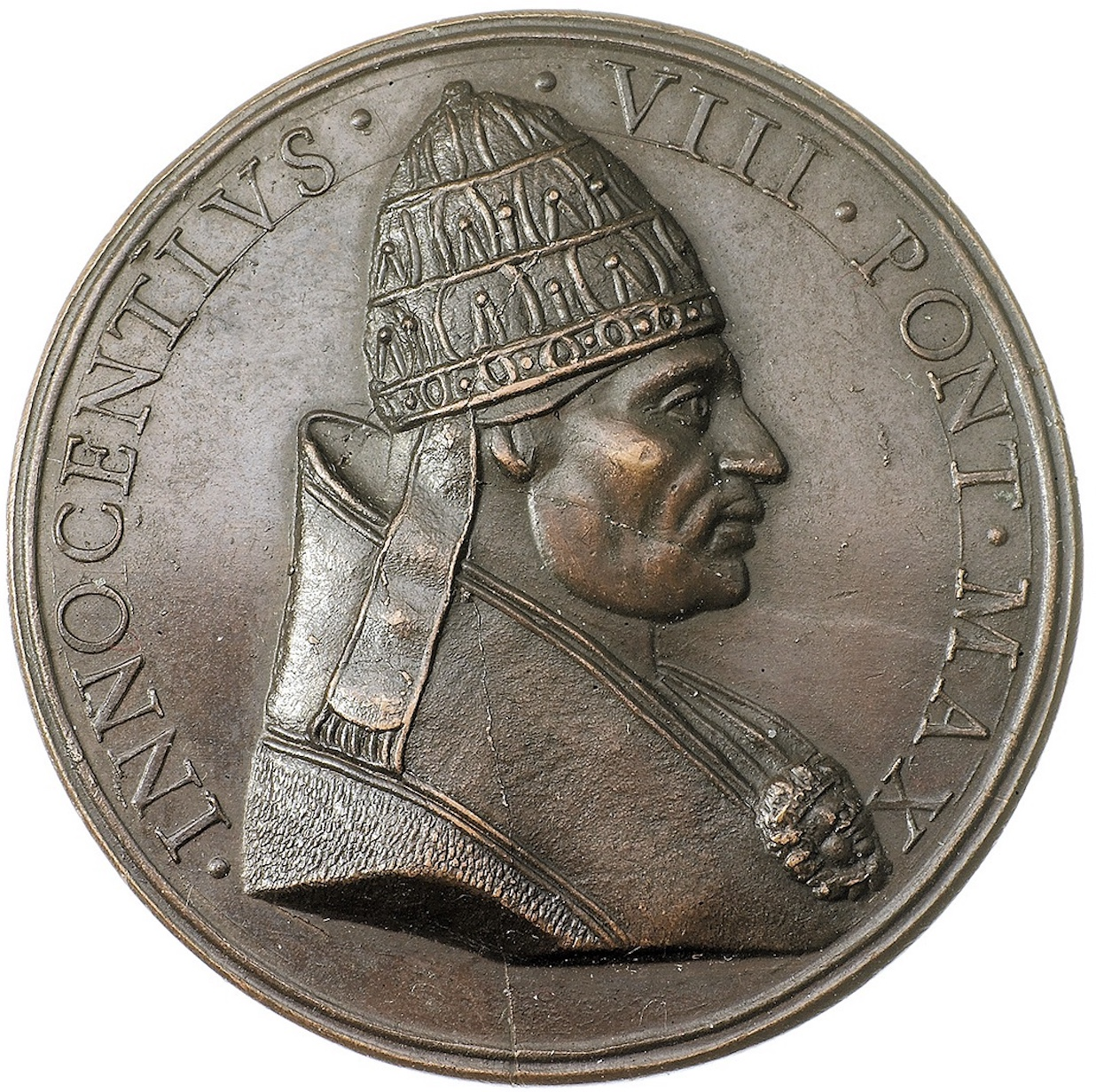
Pope Innocent VIII

Universo pene orbi is a papal bull issued by Pope Innocent VIII on 13 November 1487 calling for a crusade against the Ottoman Empire.

Innocent claimed that Germany and Italy were under threat from the Ottomans and declared his determination to leave no means untried for the uniting of Christendom against them.
