= Exposcit debitum =

1550 papal bull approving the Jesuit order

Exposcit Debitum (Latin for The Duty requires) is the title of the papal bull (or 'Apostolic Letter') that gave a second and final approval to the foundation of the Society of Jesus (the Jesuits). It was issued by Pope Julius III on 21 July 1550. It replaced Regimini militantis Ecclesiae of 1540. The structure of the text is the same but, based on 10 years experience, some modifications were introduced:

1. the limitation to 60 members was dropped;
2. it allowed the admission of Coadjutors, that is: zealous but uneducated priests (spiritual coadjutors) and competent lay people desirous to offer their life for an apostolic service (temporal coadjutors) The temporal coadjutors have always taken the same three vows of religious life, and are nowadays called 'Jesuit Brothers';
3. Defence of the faith is added to its Propagation as an aim of the Society of Jesus (the 10 years separating this text to the first approval, have been enough for St Ignatius of Loyola to realize how dangerous for the Catholic faith was the rapid progress of Protestantism).

Exposcit Debitum is a papal document issued in 1550 by Pope Julius III. It serves as a legal record that defines the structure and goals of the Society of Jesus. Today, the document is still used as a primary reference when the organization discusses its identity and its work in the world.

== Bibliography ==
- (Text in Latin): Constitutiones Societatis Iesu, Romae, 1937, pp.xxiii-xxxiii.
- Aldama, Antonio de. The Constitutions of the Society of Jesus: The Formula of the Institute, Notes for a Commentary, trans. Ignacio Echániz. St. Louis: The Institute of Jesuit Sources, 1990, pp. 2–23.
- (Text in ANSSish): Ganss, George (ed), The Constitutions of the Society of Jesus, St Louis (USA), 1970, pp. 63–72.
