= Creed of Pius IV =

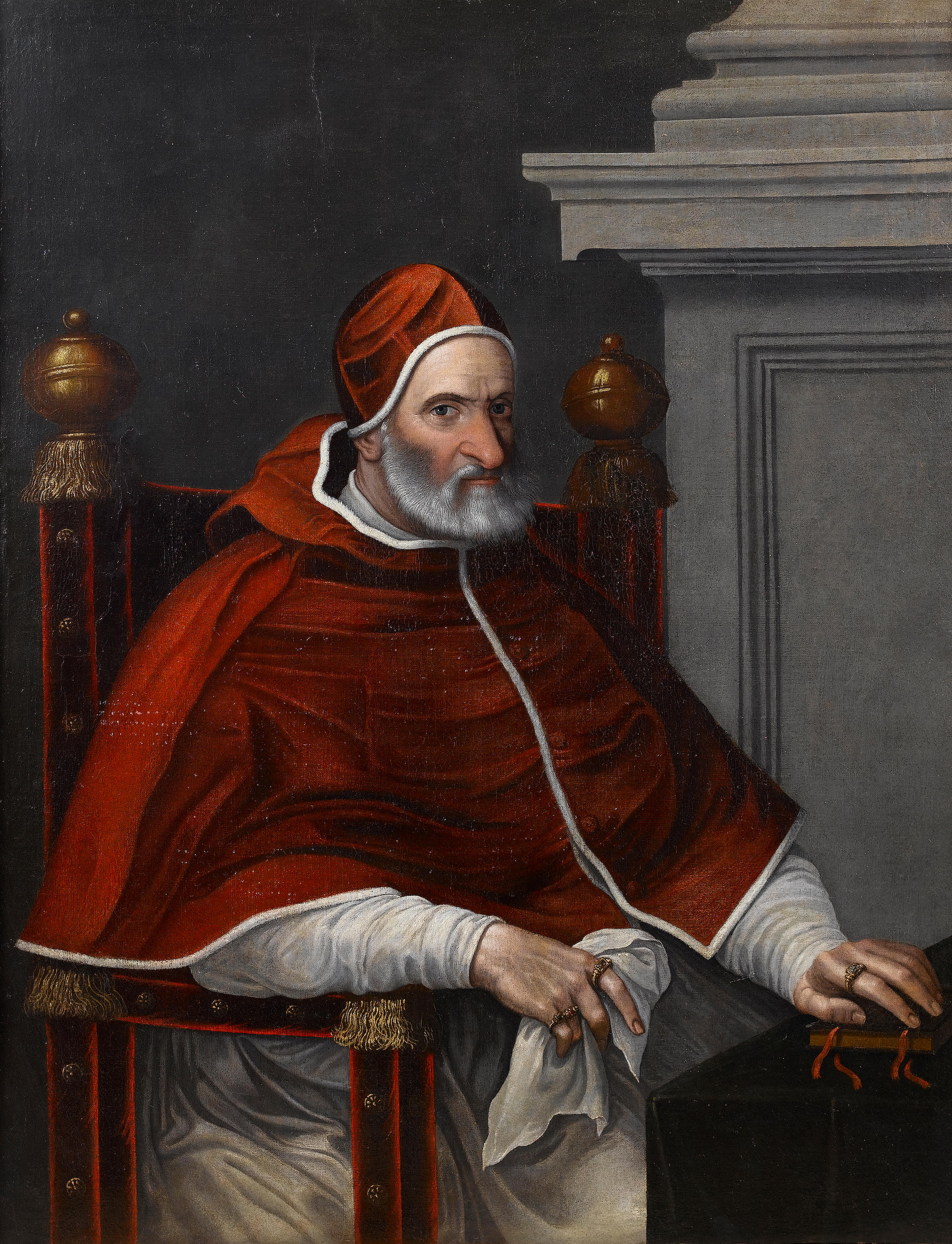
Painting of Pope Pius IV from the 1560s.

The Creed of Pius IV, also knows at the Tridentine Creed or the Professio fidei Tridentinae, is a confession of faith issued by Pope Pius IV in the year following the Council of Trent. The creed was published on 13 November 1564 in the papal bull Injunctum nobis (lit. 'United to us'), and its profession was mandated for bishops and holders of pastoral benefices before assuming office. The Creed summarizes the doctrines promulgated by the Council, including those on Sacred Scripture, original sin, the seven sacraments, and papal primacy.

== Background ==
The 24th session of the Council of Trent, held in 1563, stipulated that professions of faith should be made by newly appointed bishops and those promoted to a benefice. In 1564, Pius IV ordered a committee of cardinals to prepare the text.

== Text of the Creed ==
The Creed is made up of twelve articles. The first article is a restatement of the Nicene Creed. The remaining articles were given in an English translation by the Cyclopædia of Biblical, Theological and Ecclesiastical Literature:

I most firmly admit and embrace apostolical and ecclesiastical traditions, and all other constitutions and observances of the same Church. I also admit the sacred Scriptures according to the sense which the holy mother Church has held and does hold, to whom it belongs to judge of the true sense and interpretation of the Holy Scriptures; nor will I ever take or interpret them otherwise than according to the unanimous consent of the fathers. I profess, also, that there are truly and properly seven sacraments of the new law, instituted by Jesus Christ our Lord, and for the salvation of mankind, though all are not necessary for every one — namely, baptism, confirmation, eucharist, penance, extreme unction, orders, and matrimony, and that they confer grace; and of these, baptism, confirmation, and order cannot be reiterated without sacrilege. I do also receive and admit the ceremonies of the Catholic Church, received and approved in the solemn administration of all the above-said sacraments. I receive and embrace all and every one of the things which have been defined and declared in the holy Council of Trent concerning sin and justification. I profess likewise that in the mass is offered to God a true, proper, and propitiatory sacrifice for the living and the dead; and that in the most holy sacrament of the eucharist there is truly, really, and substantially the body and blood, together with the soul and divinity, of our Lord Jesus Christ; and that there is made a conversion of the whole substance of the bread into the body, and of the whole substance of the wine into the blood, which conversion the Catholic Church calls transubstantiation. I confess, also, that under either kind alone, whole and entire, Christ and a true sacrament is received. I constantly told that there is a purgatory, and that the souls detained therein are helped by the suffrages of the faithful. Likewise that the saints reigning together with Christ are to be honored and invocated, that they offer prayers to God for us, and that their relics are to be venerated. I most firmly assert that the images of Christ, and of the mother of God ever Virgin, and also of the other saints, are to be had and retained, and that due honor and veneration are to be given to them. I also affirm that the power of indulgences was left by Christ in the Church, and that the use of them is most wholesome to Christian people. I acknowledge the holy catholic and apostolic Roman Church, the mother and mistress of all churches; and I promise and swear true obedience to the Roman bishop, the successor of St. Peter, price of the apostles and vicar of Jesus Christ. I also profess and undoubtedly receive all other things delivered, defined, and declare by the sacred canons and general councils, and particularly by the holy Council of Trent; and like. wise I also condemn, reject, and anathematize all things contrary thereto, and: all heresies whatsoever condemned, rejected, and anathematized by the Church. This true catholic faith, out of which none can be saved, which I now freely profess and truly holy, I, [name], promise, vow, and swear most constantly to hold, and profess the same whole and entire, with God, assistance, to the end of my life; and to procure, as far as lies in my power, that the same shall be held, taught, and preached by all who are under me, or are entrusted to my care, by virtue of my office. So help me God, and these holy Gospels of God. Amen.

== Legacy ==
The Protestant minister William Ramsay delivered a 1672 sermon criticizing the Creed, which he called "the Tridentine-gospel".

In 1877, Philip Schaff reported that the Creed of Pius IV was sometimes called the "Profession of Converts," for its profession was commonly used by Protestant converts to Catholicism. For example, Elisabeth Christine of Brunswick-Wolfenbüttel was required to repudiate her Lutheran faith by swearing the Creed of Pope Pius IV, prior to her Catholic marriage to Charles VI. John Henry Newman likewise professed the Creed of Pius IV when he converted from the Church of England to Catholicism.

A modified form of the Creed of Pius IV, which included the decrees of the First Vatican Council, was promulgated in 1877. Following the Second Vatican Council, an updated creed was published by Pope Paul VI in the document Solemni hac liturgia.
