= Ecclesiam Christi =

1460 papal bull calling for a crusade

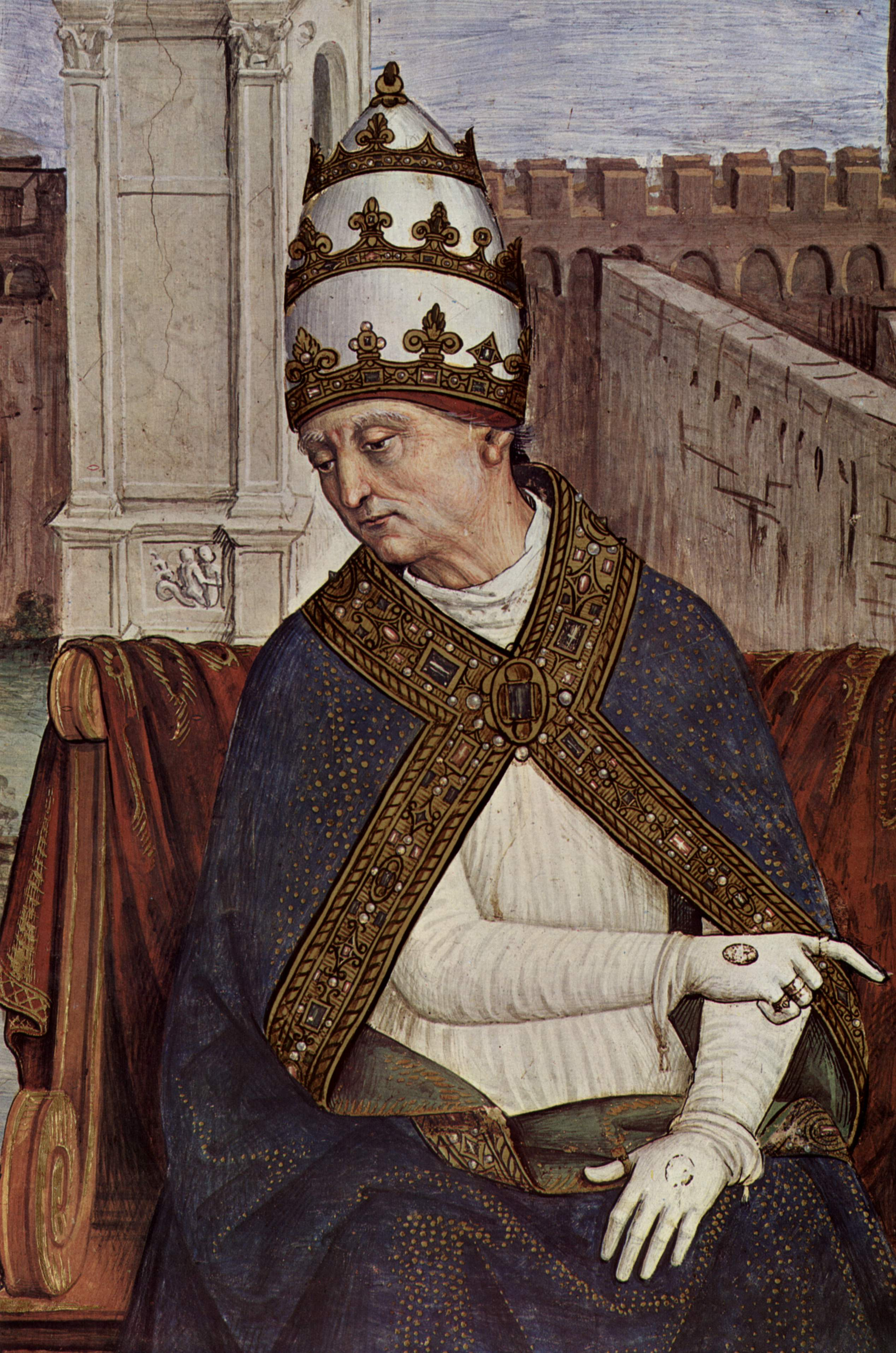
Pope Pius II

Ecclesiam Christi is a papal bull issued by Pope Pius II on 14 January 1460 calling for a three year crusade against the Ottoman Empire.

Pius issued the bull at the end of the Congress of Mantua and declared that on every Sunday at mass, God's help should be invoked to help the crusaders. A plenary indulgence was granted to those who, for eight months, took part in the crusade and to those convents and religious orders that funded at their own expense one soldier for every ten of their members.

Pius also set 1 April 1460 as the date for the departure of the crusading expedition and declared:

...following the custom of our predecessors, who proclaimed general expeditions either to liberate the Holy Land, or against other unbelievers, we declare a general war and expedition against the very perfidious Turks, the most vicious of our God's enemies, a war that is to be taken up and fought by all Christ's faithful over a period of three years, and to which each and every Christian alike is summoned to contribute according to their ability.
