= Milites Templi =

Bull issued by Pope Celestine II in 1144

Milites Templi (Latin for "Soldiers of the Temple") was a papal bull issued by Pope Celestine II in 1144.

It ordered the clergy to protect the Knights Templar and encouraged the faithful to contribute to their cause. It allowed the Templars to make their own collections once a year, even in areas under interdict.

This is one of the most important papal bulls relating to the Temple, and together with Omne datum optimum (1139) and Militia Dei (1145) forms the foundation for the Order's future wealth and success.

== Sources ==
- Barber, Malcolm (1994). The New Knighthood: A History of the Order of the Temple. Cambridge University Press.
- Nicholson, Helen J. (2001). "The Head of St. Euphemia: Templar Devotion to Female Saints". In Edgington, Susan; Lambert, Sarah (eds.). Gendering the Crusades. Columbia University Press. p. 109-120.
