= Omne datum optimum =

Bull issued by Pope Innocent II on 29 March 1139

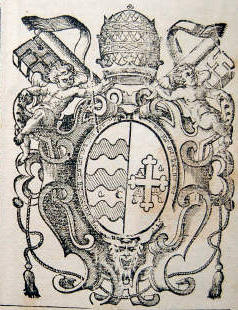
Coat of arm -Pope Innocentius II

Omne datum optimum (Latin for "Every perfect gift", a quotation from the Epistle of James 1:17) was a papal bull issued by Pope Innocent II on 29 March 1139 that endorsed the Order of the Poor Knights of Christ and of the Temple of Solomon (Knights Templar), in which the Templar Rule was officially approved, and papal protection given.

== Background ==
By the end of the 1130s, the Templars had prospered as a complete military order with a stratified structure, due to the efforts of Grand Master Robert de Craon. Already facing ecclesiastical criticism for receiving tithes and alms, Robert de Craon reasoned that the Order could only flourish with papal support. It was during one of Robert's visits to France and Italy that Innocent II issued the bull Omne datum optimum on 29 March 1139.

== Contents ==
The contents of Omne datum optimum:

- promised all spoils from Muslim conquest to the Order
- allowed the Order to build churches, cemeteries, and houses (Note: Selwood states that clergy, parishes, and monastic houses prevented the Order from building cemeteries, which caused them financial loss.)
- permitted a chaplain in every house (Note: Templar church and houses were served by the Order's own priests.)
- leaders of the Order could expel unworthy members
- allowed chapels for members and burials
- forbid the election of an outsider as Master of the Order
- no homage or tithes were to be extracted from the Order

Included in the contents of the bull was the creation of a group of chaplain brothers for the Order. They were capable of hearing confessions and giving absolution, to all members of the Orders. The Omne datum optimum gave the Order the papal sanction it needed to operate independently of ecclesiastical and secular authorities.

== Aftermath ==
Omne datum optimum was followed by Pope Celestine II's Milites Templi in 1144 and Pope Eugene III's Militia Dei in 1145, which together gave the Templars an extraordinary range of rights and privileges.

== See also ==
- Pie postulatio voluntatis, a similar bull that gave papal protection to the Knights Hospitaller

== Sources ==
- Barber, Malcolm (1978). The Trial of the Templars. Cambridge University Press.
- Barber, Malcolm (1994). The New Knighthood. Cambridge University Press.
- Barber, Malcolm; Bate, A. K. (2002). The Templars: selected sources. Manchester University Press. pp. 59–. ISBN 978-0-7190-5110-4.
- Jones, Dan (2017). The Templars: The Rise and Spectacular Fall of God's Holy Warriors. Penguin Books.
- Nicholson, Helen J.; Burgtorf, Jochen, eds. (2020). The Templars, the Hospitallers and the Crusades: Essays in Homage to Alan J Forey. Routledge.
- Rayborn, Tim (2013). The Violent Pilgrimage: Christians, Muslims and Holy Conflicts, 850-1150. McFarland, Inc.
- Selwood, Dominic (2001). Knights of the Cloister: Templars and Hospitallers in Central-southern Occitania, C.1100-c.1300. The Boydell Press.
- Upton-Ward, Judith Mary, ed. (1997). "Introduction". The Rule of the Templars: The French Text of the Rule of the Order of the Knights Templar. The Boydell Press.
