= Cum his superioribus annis =

1456 papal bull by Pope Callixtus III

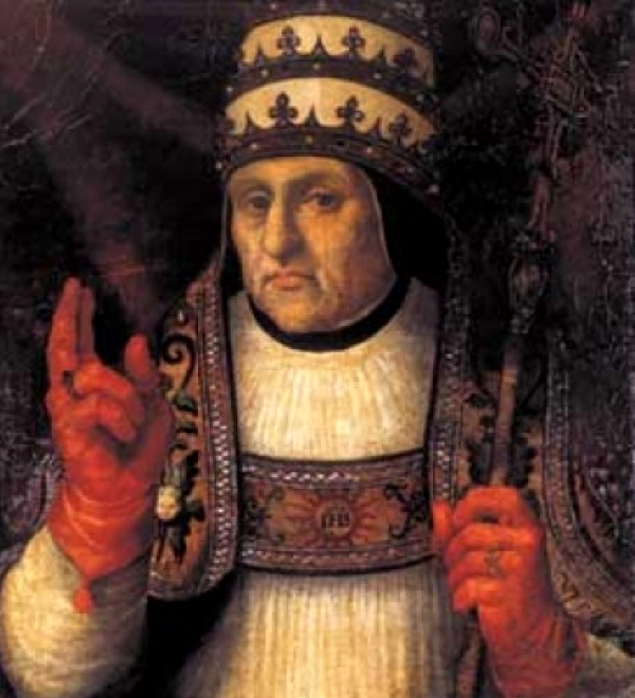
Pope Callixtus III

Cum his superioribus annis is a papal bull issued by Pope Callixtus III on 29 June 1456.

Callixtus addressed the clergy of all Christendom and exhorted them by prayers, fasting and penance to "return to the Lord, that He may again return to us". He also ordered processions in each diocese on the first Sunday of each month to pray for the defeat of the threatened Ottoman invasion. Every priest was ordered by Callixtus to recite the following prayer: "Almighty, ever-lasting God, to whom all power belongs, and in whose hand are the rights of all nations, protect Thy Christian people and crush by Thy power the pagans who trust in their fierceness". Indulgences were granted and Callixtus further ordered that in every church, between noon and vespers, one or more bells should be rung for the angelus, with three "Our Fathers" and "Hail Marys" recited.
