= Militia Dei =

Bull issued by Pope Eugene III in 1145

Militia Dei (Latin for Soldiers of God) is a papal bull issued by Pope Eugene III on 7 April 1145 that consolidated the Knights Templar's independence from local clerical hierarchies by giving the Order the right to take tithes and burial fees and to bury their dead in their own cemeteries. The Knights were allowed to travel through Europe freely.

This bull together with Omne datum optimum (1139) and Milites Templi form the foundation for the Order's future wealth and success.

== Sources ==
- Barber, Malcolm (1994). The New Knighthood. Cambridge: Cambridge University Press. ISBN 978-1-107-60473-5.
- Burman, Edward (1986). The Templars: Knights of God. Rochester, Vermont: Destiny Books. ISBN 0-89281-221-4.
