= Apostolicae Servitutis =

1741 papal bull banning worldly pursuits by clergy

Apostolicae Servitutis was a papal bull issued by Pope Benedict XIV, 23 February 1741, against secular pursuits on the part of the clergy.

In spite of many prohibitive laws of the Catholic Church, some ecclesiastics had drifted into the habit of occupying themselves with worldly business and pursuits. The object of this papal prohibition was to check that abuse among the clergy. To that end, it recalls and confirms the statutes made by former popes against such abuses, and extends those proscriptions to such ecclesiastics as might, in order to evade the penalties attached, engage in worldly pursuits under the name of lay persons. It prohibits ecclesiastics from continuing business affairs begun by lay persons unless in case of necessity, and then only with the permission of the Sacred Congregation of the Council within Italy, and with the permission of the Diocesan Ordinary outside of Italy.
