= Vocavit nos pius =

1458 papal bull preparing for a crusade

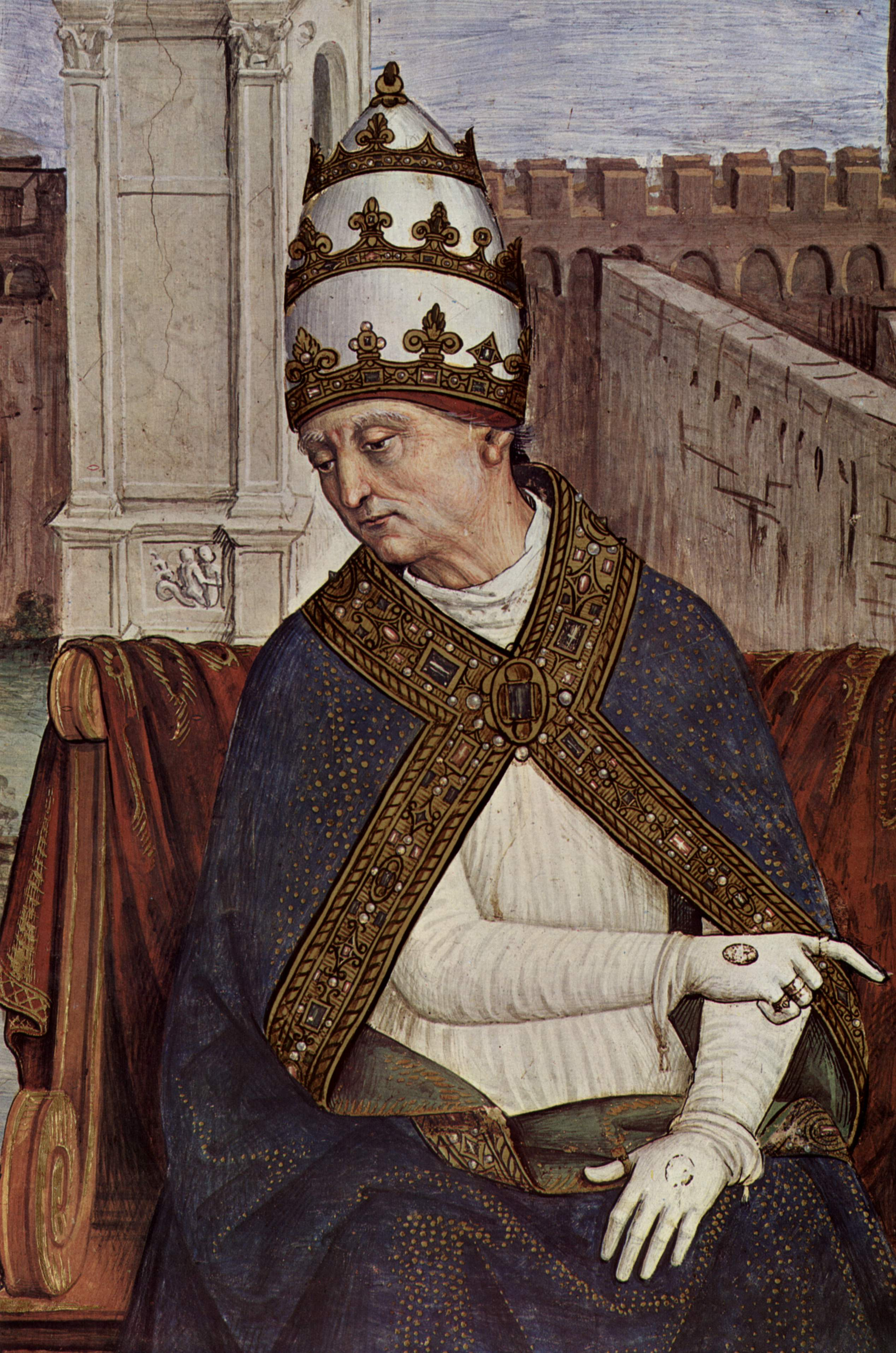
Pope Pius II

Vocavit nos pius (13 October 1458) is a papal bull issued by Pope Pius II inviting all the European rulers to a Congress to prepare for a crusade against the Ottoman Empire.

Pius declared that since the time of Constantine the Church had never been so trampled upon than she now was by the followers of the "false prophet Mahomet". He claimed this was a punishment from God for the sins of the nations but that God had appointed him to the Holy See to deliver the world from this threat. Pius accepted this would be difficult but added: "The bark of the Church often rocks to and fro, but it does not sink; it is buffeted, but not shattered; it is assailed, but not wrecked; God permits His people to be tried, but He will not suffer them to be overwhelmed".

A Congress was duly held in Mantua in 1459–60.
