= Ascendente Domino =

Ascendente Domino was a papal bull issued by Pope Gregory XIII, 24 May 1584, in favor of the Society of Jesus, to confirm the constitution of the Society, and the privileges already granted to it by Paul III, Julius III, Paul IV, and Pius V.

It recalls and confirms the means which St. Ignatius Loyola had prescribed in order that the Society might attain the end for which he had founded it. Candidates have first to make two years' novitiate; they then take three simple vows. Thus they cease to be novices, and belong to the body of the Society. These simple vows are perpetuated on the part of those who make them, but on the part of the Society they bind only so long as the General thinks fit to retain as members of the Society those who have taken them.

The unformed Temporal Coadjutors, after some years, if the General thinks them fit, are admitted to the grade of Formed Temporal Coadjutors. But before they become either Professed or Formed Spiritual Coadjutors, the Scholastics, having completed their studies, must go through a third year's probation. If professed, they take a 'Fourth vow' of special obedience to assume any mission the Pope may enjoin on them.

The simple vows which they make after their novitiate constitute them religious in the true and proper sense of the word, with the consequent privileges. Thus they enjoy the exemption of regulars; and their simple vows, as solemn vows with other religious, are a diriment impediment to matrimony, that is, a marriage contract attempted by a Jesuit with simple vows, even though he not be a priest, would be null and void.
