= Non parum animus noster =

Papal bull issued by Pope Alexander III

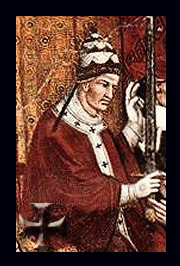
Depiction of Pope Alexander III in a 14th-century fresco

Non parum animus noster (Latin for "Our mind is deeply [troubled]") was a crusading bull issued by Pope Alexander III on either 11 September 1171 or 1172 to promote the Northern Crusades against the pagan Estonians and Finns. It was addressed to the rulers and peoples of Denmark, Sweden and Norway and begins with a description of the threat posed by the Estonians. Alexander declared:

We are deeply distressed and greatly worried when we hear that the savage Estonians and other pagans in those parts rise and fight God's faithful and those who labour for the Christian faith and fight the virtue of the Christian name... to gird yourselves, armed with celestial weapons and the strength of Apostolic exhortations, to defend the truth of the Christian faith bravely and to expand the Christian faith forcefully.

Alexander further promised an indulgence and one year's remission of sin to those who fought the pagans. Those who died in this crusade would receive full indulgence:

Trusting God's mercy and merits of the apostles Peter and Paul, we thus concede to those forcefully and magnanimously fighting these often mentioned pagans one year's remission of sins for which they have made confession and received a penance as we are accustomed to grant those who go to the Lord's Sepulchre. To those who die in this fight we grant remission of all their sins, if they have received a penance.

The sole copy of the bull to survive is in Peter Cellensis' letter-book.

== Divini dispensatione ==
Pope Eugenius III issued a papal bull called Divini dispensatione in 1147, endorsing the brief Wendish Crusade, which was part of the Northern Crusades.
