= Cogimur jubente altissimo =

1481 papal bull

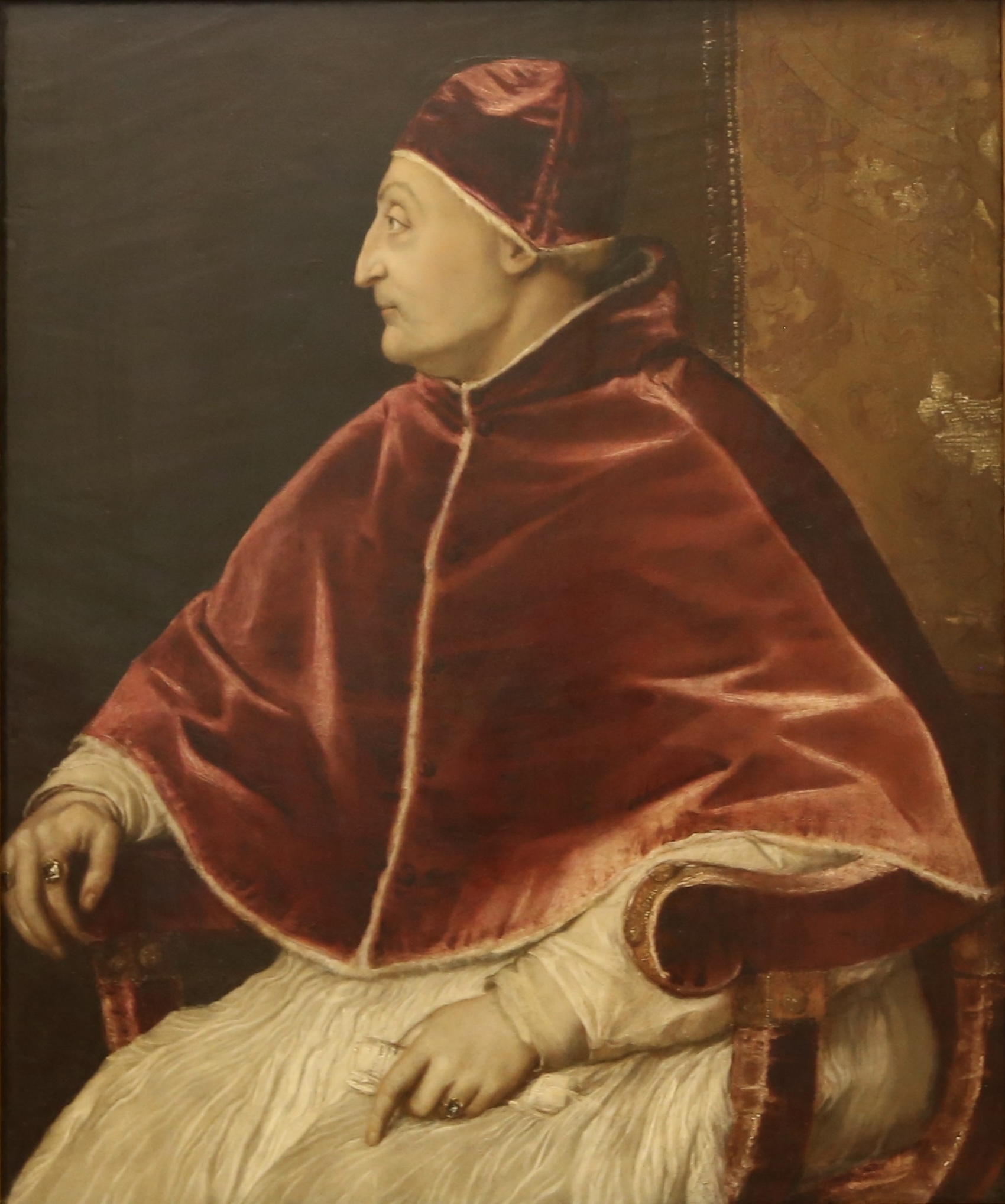
Pope Sixtus IV

Cogimur jubente altissimo is a papal bull issued by Pope Sixtus IV on 8 April 1481 calling for a crusade against the Ottoman Empire.

Sixtus granted indulgences to those who took part in the crusade and instituted a tithe to pay for it. He also surrendered his own silver plate to fund the crusade.
