= Terra Sancta Christi =

1245 papal bull by Pope Innocent IV

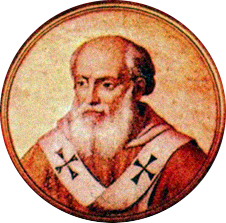
Pope Innocent IV

Terra Sancti Christi is a papal bull issued by Pope Innocent IV on 23 January 1245 calling for a crusade to the Holy Land. In December 1244 Louis IX of France had declared his intention to go on a crusade to the Holy Land, and in February Innocent ordered the Franciscans to preach in favour of it.
