= Etsi ecclesia Christi =

1453 papal bull by Pope Nicholas V

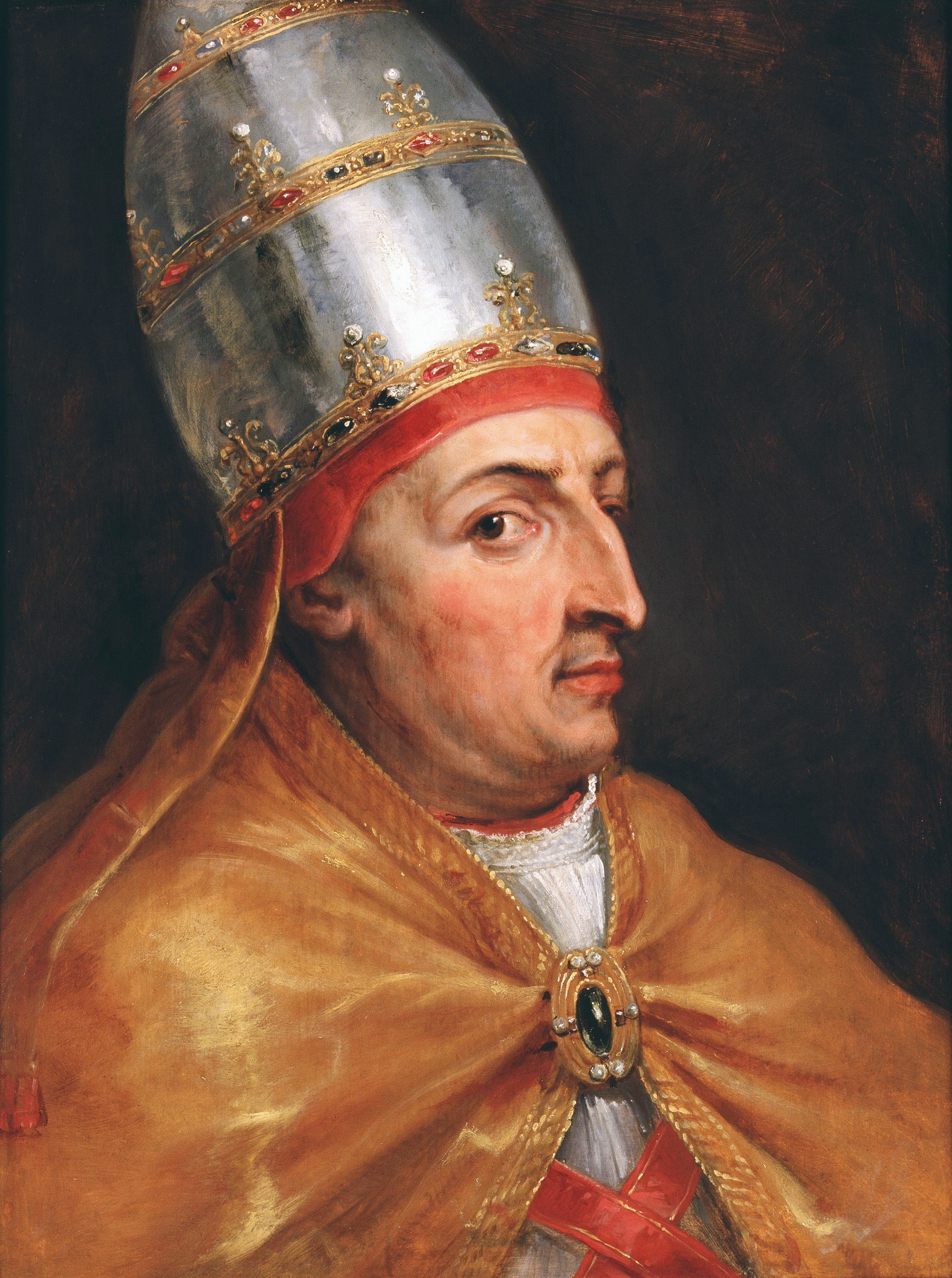
Pope Nicholas V

Etsi ecclesia Christi is a papal bull issued by Pope Nicholas V on 30 September 1453 in response to the fall of Constantinople to the Ottoman Empire.

Nicholas declared that the capture of Constantinople by the Ottomans was the latest in a long line of attacks on Christendom from Islam, whose followers had already conquered the East, Egypt and North Africa. He further claimed that these were the fulfilment of John's prophecies in the Book of Revelation and he called the Ottoman Sultan Mehmed II the "second Mohammed", and a forerunner of the Anti-Christ. Nicholas called on Christian rulers to defend Christendom with their lives and their money and he granted indulgences to those who, for six months, took part in this crusade.
