= Order of Our Lady of Bethlehem =

Military order

There were two military orders known as the Order of Our Lady of Bethlehem.

Matthew Paris mentions that Henry III of England authorized them to open a house in a suburb of Cambridge in 1257; but he does not mention their founder, where they originated, and their history. Their habit was similar to that of the Dominicans and that a red star, whose five rays emanated from an azure centre, decorated the breast of their cape. This was in commemoration of the star that appeared to the Magi and led them to Bethlehem. Nothing further is known of this military order. There was an order of knights whose members wore a red star on their costume because of having a house in Bethlehem at the time of the Crusades; this was the Military Order of the Crusaders of the Red Star (Ordo militaris crucigerorum cum rubeâ stellâ). They came from Palestine to Bohemia in 1217, and Blessed Agnes of Bohemia confided two hospitals to their charge. They have since remained in that country where they devote themselves to the care of the sick, to education, and to the various works of the ecclesiastical ministry.

After the taking of Constantinople by the Turks (1453), Pius II founded the Order of Our Lady of Bethlehem. The purpose of these knights was to defend the island of Lemnos which Cardinal Louis, Patriarch of Aquileia, had recaptured from Mohammed II. The island was to be their headquarters from which they were to oppose the attacks of the Muslims by way of the Ægean Sea and the Hellespont. The order was composed of brother-knights and priests governed by an elective grand-master. The white costume worn by the members was decorated with a red cross and the rule prescribed for them was very similar to that of the Knights of St. John of Jerusalem. The pope founded this community on 18 January 1459. To supply their needs, the pope turned over to them the property and revenues of older orders which no longer fulfilled their purpose, such as: the Order of Saint Lazarus, Order of Sainte-Marie du Château des Bretons, Order of Bologna, Order of the Holy Sepulchre, Order of Santo Spirito in Sassia, Order of St. Mary of the Crossed Friars, and Order of St. James of Lucca, all of which were suppressed for this purpose. Pius II alluded in a bull to this foundation and the bravery of its knights, but the second capture of Lemnos by the Turks rendered the institution useless. Thus the order of Our Lady of Bethlehem was suppressed almost as soon as founded and those orders whose goods the pope had transmitted to it were re-established.

== See also ==
- Monastic Family of Bethlehem, of the Assumption of the Virgin and of Saint Bruno
