= Baucent =

War flag used by the Knights Templar

Baucent

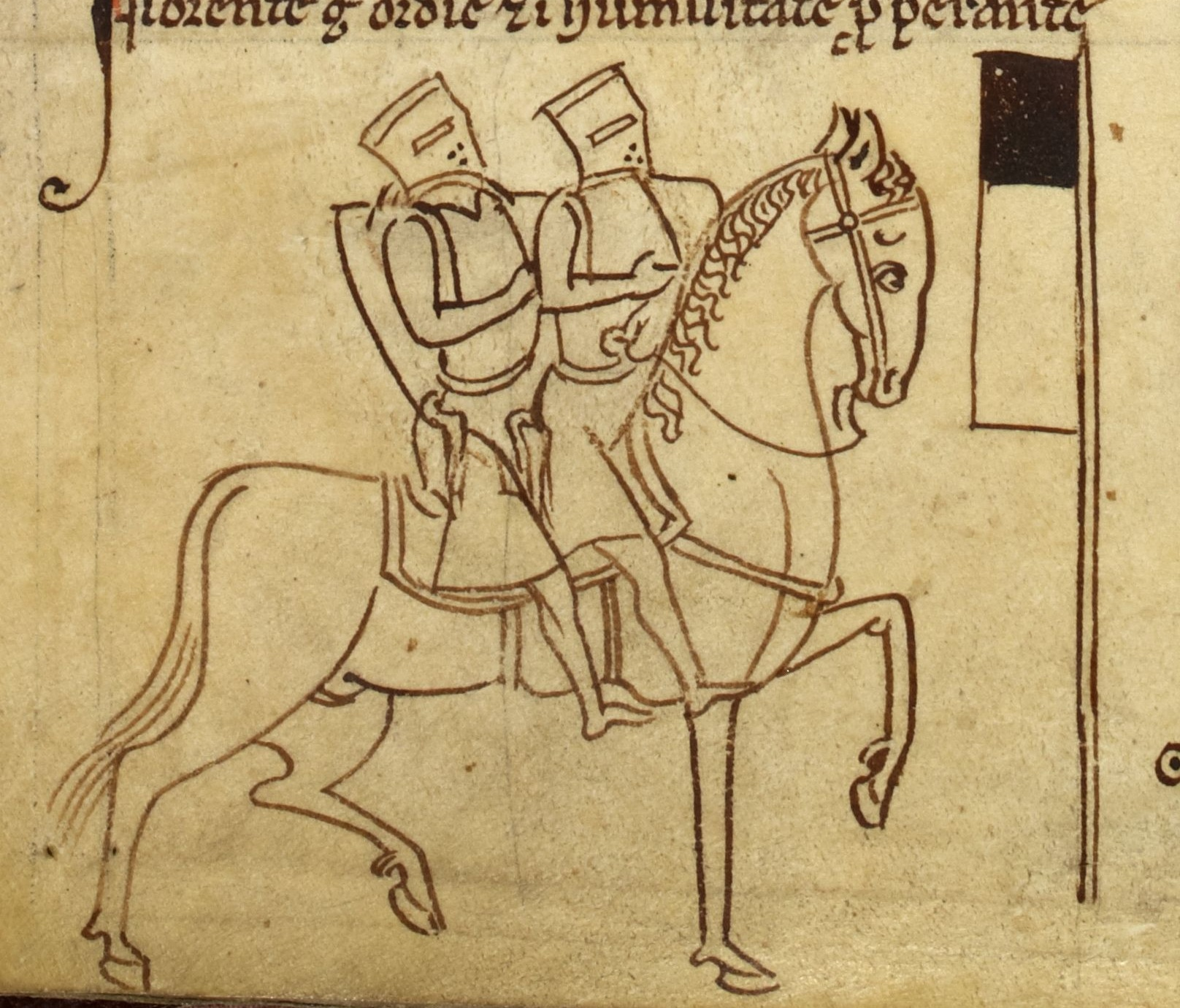
The emblem of the Templars, two knights seated on a single horse, shown alongside the Beauséant; miniature from the Chronica of Matthew Paris (c. 1250–1259)

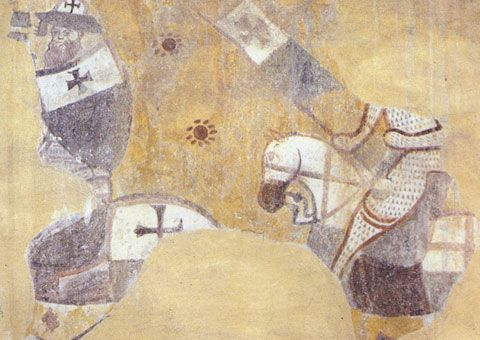
Fragment of the fresco at San Bevignate (c. 1290) showing the gonfanon with a red cross patty

Baucent (bauceant, baussant, etc.) was the name of the war flag (vexillum belli) used by the Knights Templar in the 12th and 13th centuries.

== Description ==
13th-century sources show it as a white gonfanon with a black chief (argent a chief sable). Jacques de Vitry, writing in the 1220s, mentions the gonfanon baucent and explains that the black and white colours symbolise the Templar's ferocity towards their enemies and their kindness towards their friends. It appears that later in the 13th century, the red cross of the Templar could be added to the banner. In a damaged fresco of the late 13th century in the Templar church of San Bevignate, Perugia, a Templar banner is depicted with the upper half in white and the lower half in black, with the red cross patty attached to the white field. The same fresco also shows a shield and horse-covers in the same design. It was reportedthat the war flag had been inscribed with the verse "Nōn nōbīs, Domine, nōn nōbīs, sed nōminī tuō dā glōriam."

== Naming ==
The name baucent (also spelled bausent, bauceant, baussant, beausseant, beauséant etc.) in origin is the Old French term for a piebald horse. The name was later approximated to the French bien-séant, meaning "decorous, becoming". The name was also used as a battle cry by the Templars: "À moi, beau sire! Beauséant à la rescousse!" (French for "To me, good sire! Beauséant to the rescue").

== Regulations of use ==
According to the statutes of the order as edited by Münter (1794), each squadron (eschielle) of the order had its own banner. In battle, the banner-bearer was obliged to avoid direct contact with the enemy, and between five and ten brothers were specifically charged with guarding the banner. If any brother were to find himself separated from his banner, he was obliged to try to reach the nearest Christian banner in the field. No brother was permitted, on pain of expulsion from the order, to leave the field of battle as long as at least one banner of the order was still flying. If all of the Templars' banners had been lost, the men were expected to flock to the nearest banner of the Hospitallers, or any other Christian banner still flying. Only after the last Christian banner had fallen were they permitted to think about saving their own lives.

== Use by others ==
After the dissolution of the order, the Freemasons adopted the banner.

It has also been noted that, according to a medieval legend, Alexander the Great was said to have had a similar banner with miraculous powers.

== See also ==
- Knights Templar Seal
