= Battle of Trapessac (1237) =

1337 conflict between the Ayyubids and Knights Templar

- Part of Crusades
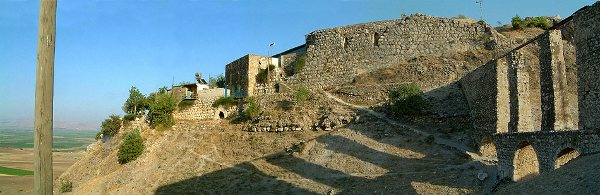
- Trapessac fortress
| Date | June 1237 |
| Location | Trapessac |
| Result | Ayyubid victory |

Belligerents
| Knights Templar | Ayyubid Dynasty |

Commanders and leaders
| William of Montferrat † | Al-Mu'azzam Turanshah |

Strength
| 120 Templars; 300 crossbowmen | Unknown |

Casualties and losses
| 100 Templars killed or captured All crossbowmen killed | Unknown |

The Battle of Trapessac was a military engagement between Knights Templar and the Ayyubids at the fortress of Trapessac. The Templars attempted to capture the castle; but the Ayyubid garrison resisted the attack and a relief force decimated the Templars, inflicting a crushing defeat.

== Background ==
The fortress of Trapessac was a stronghold belonging to the military order of Knights Templar. In the year 1188, the Ayyubid Sultan Saladin captured the castle from the Templars, and thus it remained in Ayyubid hands thereafter. In the year 1237, the Templars of Bagras fortress attacked a group of Turkmen tribes who settled east of Lake Amik. This attack provoked the Emir of Aleppo, Al-Mu'azzam Turanshah, to attack and capture Bagras Fortress. The besieged Templars ran out of supplies and were on the verge of surrender. However, Bohemond V of Antioch sent delegates to request a truce with him. The Emir accepted the truce and returned to Trepassey. The preceptor of the Templars in Antioch, William of Montferrat, considered the truce humiliating and decided to break the truce and attack Trepassec.

== Battle ==
In June of the same year, William, with a force of 120 Templar knights and 300 crossbowmen, decided to attack Trepassec, hoping to restore Templar pride. The Crusaders attacked the lower town of the fort (the civilian settlement below the citadel). The Ayyubid soldiers stationed there, though surprised, managed to resist the Crusaders, who were then joined by the rest of the garrison. Their strong resistance made it impossible to assault the fort. The Ayyubid garrison also dispatched a messenger to Al-Mu'azzam for help. The Frankish prisoners at the fort heard of the attack and shouted to the Templars, urging them to retreat before the arrival of a relief force, but they ignored it. An Ayyubid relief force swiftly arrived and overran the Templars, massacring them. William was killed alongside the standard bearer, and Raymond d'Argentan and his commanders were captured. The defeat was total; only 20 Templars managed to escape alive while their comrades were either killed or captured, and all crossbowmen were killed as well.

== Aftermath ==
The Templars suffered one of their worst defeats at Trapessac. The victorious Ayyubids carried the prisoners and the heads of the dead to Aleppo. Despite their victory, the Ayyubids decided to renew the truce with Bohemond, thus saving Bagras from falling into their hands. The crushing defeat of the Templars generated a necessary mobilization for Templars and Knights Hospitaller in Europe. When news of the defeat reached England, the Hospitaller prior collected a large amount of money for the Holy Land. King Henry III of England gave the Templars 500 marks to ransom their captives. The Papacy dispatched several messages to the leaders of Outremer to encourage the freedom of prisoners after the defeat.

== Sources ==
- René Grousset (1934), History of the Crusades and the Frankish Kingdom of Jerusalem, Vol III. (In French).
- Anne-Marie Eddé (1999), The Ayyubid principality of Aleppo (579/1183-658/1260) (In French).
- Steven Runciman (1987), A History of the Crusades, Vol III.
- Judith Bronstein (2005), The Hospitallers and the Holy Land, Financing the Latin East, 1187–1274.
- Geordie Torr (2020), The Templars, The Legend and Legacy of the Warriors of God.
