= Capture of Soure (1144) =

Almoravid conquest of a Knights Templar castle in 1144

- Part of Reconquista
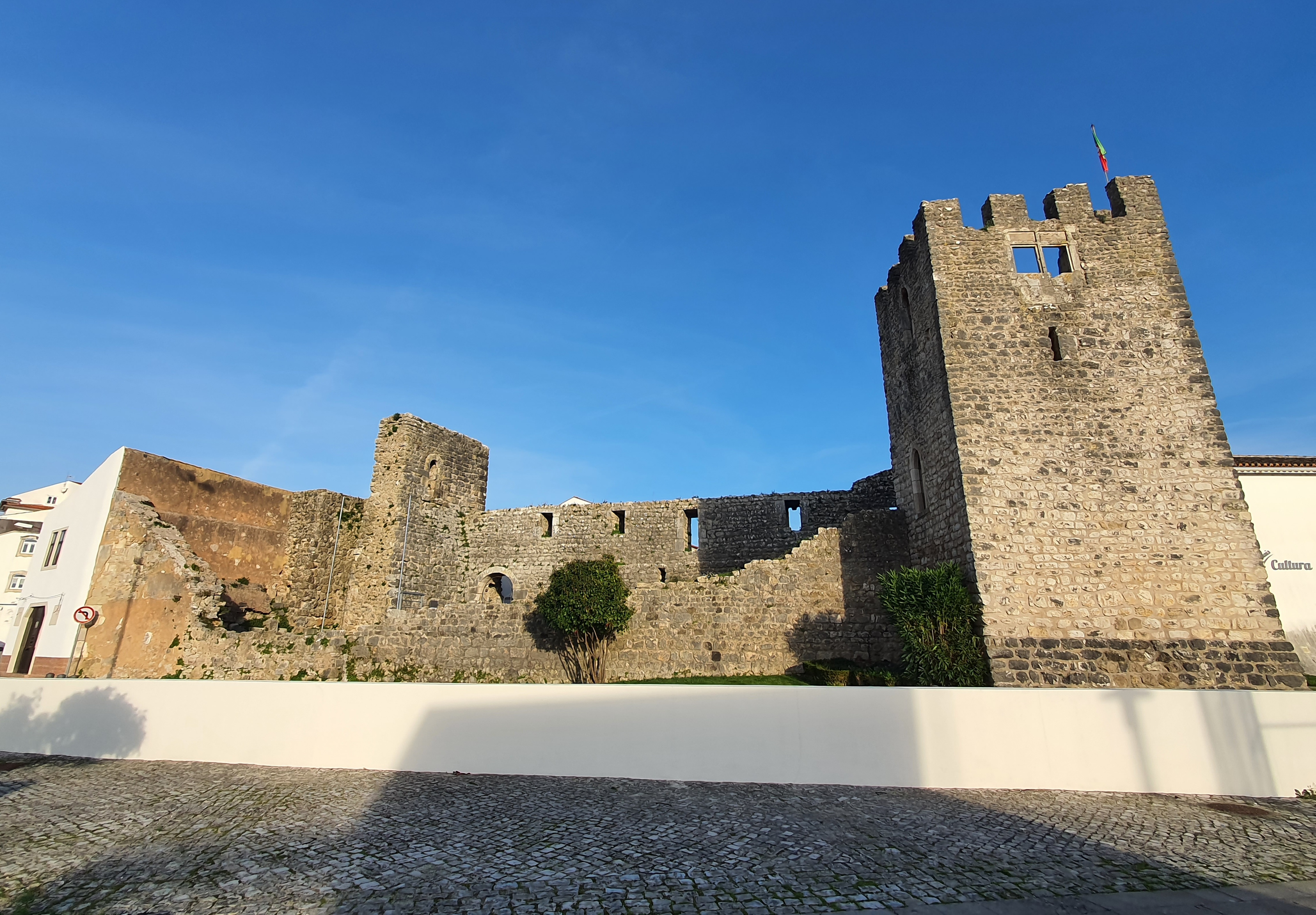
- Castle of Soure
Date	September 1144
Location	Soure, Portugal
Result	Almoravid victory

Belligerents
Almoravids	Knights Templar

Commanders and leaders
Abu Zakariya	Unknown

Strength
4,000 men	Unknown

Casualties and losses
Unknown	Heavy

The Capture of Soure occurred in 1144, when the Almoravids of Gharb al-Andalus, attacked and captured the Knights Templar Castle of Soure, in the newly formed Kingdom of Portugal.

== Background ==
The Knights Templar was a military order of the Catholic faith formed at the beginning of the 12th Century (c.1118-1120) to defend the Crusader states established in the Levant. Shortly after the creation of the order, the Knights Templar established a military outpost in the County of Portugal to support their participation in the Reconquista. On 19 March 1128, Countess Teresa of Portugal donated the Castle of Soure in the frontier territory to the Knights Templars. Thereafter, the Knights Templar used the castle as their "mother house" for the administrative, logistical, and military operations directed against Muslims in Portugal.

== History ==
In September 1144, the Almoravids, led by the Governor of the city of Santarém, Abu Zakariya, along with the Prince of Cordoba, initiated a raid into Portuguese territory with a force of 4,000 men. At the outset, the Almoravid forces attacked the castle of Tomar, taking its inhabitants by surprise before they had a chance to warn the Portuguese King, Afonso I. Following that event, the Almoravids traveled north, avoiding Penela and Pombal, until they reached Soure.

The Almoravids then prepared an ambush by hiding in the valleys while sending a small force to the castle to provoke the Templars. The Templars launched a sortie in response falling into the trap. The Templars were defeated, with most killed or captured. The Almoravids then assaulted the castle, ultimately making their way through the defenses to capture the outpost. Among the prisoners taken was the Portuguese Canon Martin of Soure. The slaves, livestock, and weapons were confiscated as the spoils of war before the castle was destroyed by fire. The Almoravids then left the Portuguese frontier and returned to Santarém.
