= Battle of Fariskur =

Battle of Fariskur may refer to:

- Battle of Fariskur (1219), during the Fifth Crusade
- Battle of Fariskur (1250), during the Seventh Crusade, whereat Louis IX of France was captured
