= Siege of Trapessac (1188) =

1188 conflict between the Ayyubids and Knights Templar

- Part of Crusades
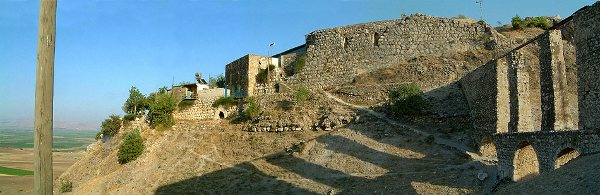
- Trapessac fortress
Date	2 – 13 September 1188
Location	Trapessac
Result	Ayyubid victory

Belligerents
Knights Templar	Ayyubid Dynasty

Commanders and leaders
Unknown	Saladin

Strength
Unknown	Unknown

The Siege of Trapessac took place in September 1188 between the Ayyubid Sultanate led by Saladin and the Knights Templar, who held the fortress of Trapessac. After 2 weeks of siege, the city was captured.

== Siege ==
The Ayyubid Sultan Saladin began his military operations against the Principality of Antioch on July 2, 1188, capturing several fortresses. Antioch was protected by the Templar strongholds of Trapessac and Bagras. Saladin attacked Trapessac first. On September 2nd, the Ayyubids began the siege. The fortifications and position of Trapessac made the siege a difficult task. The Ayyubid forces began bombarding the castle with catapults constantly while simultaneously mining under one of the walls. This proved successful, and a breach was made. The Ayyubids then assaulted the walls. The Templars began forming a human wall at the breach. When one Templar falls, another takes his place, as one eyewitness claimed. The battle raged for two weeks, and despite the bravery of the Templars, they had no choice but to surrender on the 13th. The Templars dispatched messages to Bohemond III of Antioch, but no help arrived. The Templars were allowed to leave for Antioch in exchange for leaving their weapons, stores, and grains and paying a heavy ransom of 5,000 dinars from their treasury.

== Aftermath ==
The capture of Trapessac was celebrated by Muslim historians in their book, describing the fort as prestigious and containing significant booty. Considered an important fort that secured both the Crusaders and the Armenians. Under Leo I, King of Armenia, they attempted to capture the fort in 1205 but were repelled. In 1237, the Templars sought to recapture the fort but suffered a severe defeat.

== Sources ==
- Buttigieg, Emanuel; Vidal, Clara Almagro (25 March 2025). The Military Orders Volume VIII: In a Wider World. Taylor & Francis. ISBN 978-1-040-33340-2.
- Grbasic, Zvonimir (11 August 2022). The Templars at War. Pen and Sword Military. ISBN 978-1-4738-9842-4.
- Molin, Kristian (1 April 2001). Unknown Crusader Castles. Bloomsbury Publishing. ISBN 978-0-8264-3201-8.
- Boase, Thomas Sherrer Ross (1978). The Cilician Kingdom of Armenia. Scottish Academic Press. ISBN 978-0-7073-0145-7.
