= Martin of Soure =

- Born: Martinho Manuel de Soure; 11th Century; Auranca, County of Portugal
- Died: January 31, 1146; Córdoba
- Venerated in: Catholic Church

Martin of Soure, born Martinho Manuel de Soure and also known as Martinho Árias, was a canon of the Cathedral of Coimbra, and a martyr of the Catholic Church.

== Life ==
Martin was the son of Manuel Aires and Argia. He entered clerical service under the care of Bishop Maurice of Coimbra. Bishop Maurice was the cousin of Martin's father, who requested that the Bishop oversee his son's training.

Martin lived and trained in the house of the Bishop (in Fradelos, Albergaria-a-Velha, Aveiro District). Later in life, Martin served as the canon of the Cathedral of Coimbra.

As an ordained priest, Martin led an exemplary life and was admired for his virtue and charity. Around 1124 he moved to the border town of Soure with his brother Mendo. He established an ecclesiastical chapter to restore the church and give spiritual assistance to people who had been attacked by Almoravids in 1117.

== Martyrdom ==
In 1144, the Almorvid governor of Santarém, Abu Zakaria, captured and destroyed the Knights Templar Castle of Soure, ultimately taking a number of prisoners including Martin to Santarém. While being held as a prison, Martin predicted that Afonso I of Portugal would avenge the destruction of Soure by attacking and capturing Santarém. As a result of this prophecy, Abu Zakaria's had Martin taken to Évora, Seville, and eventually Córdoba, where Martin was tortured and died in prison in 1146.

The monk Salvado de Santa Cruz wrote about the life of Saint Martin of Soure in approximately 1150.

== Citations ==
- "Patrono » Agrupamento de Escolas Martinho Árias, Soure". 2015-07-08. Archived from the original on 2015-07-08.

== General References ==
- Nascimento, Aires A. (1998). Hagiografia de Santa Cruz de Coimbra: Vida de D. Telo, Vida de D. Teotónio, Vida de Martinho de Soure. Obras clássicas da literatura portuguesa (in Portuguese). Lisboa: Edições Colibri. ISBN 972-772-052-8.
