= Templari Cattolici d'Italia =

Templari Cattolici d'Italia (Catholic Templars of Italy)
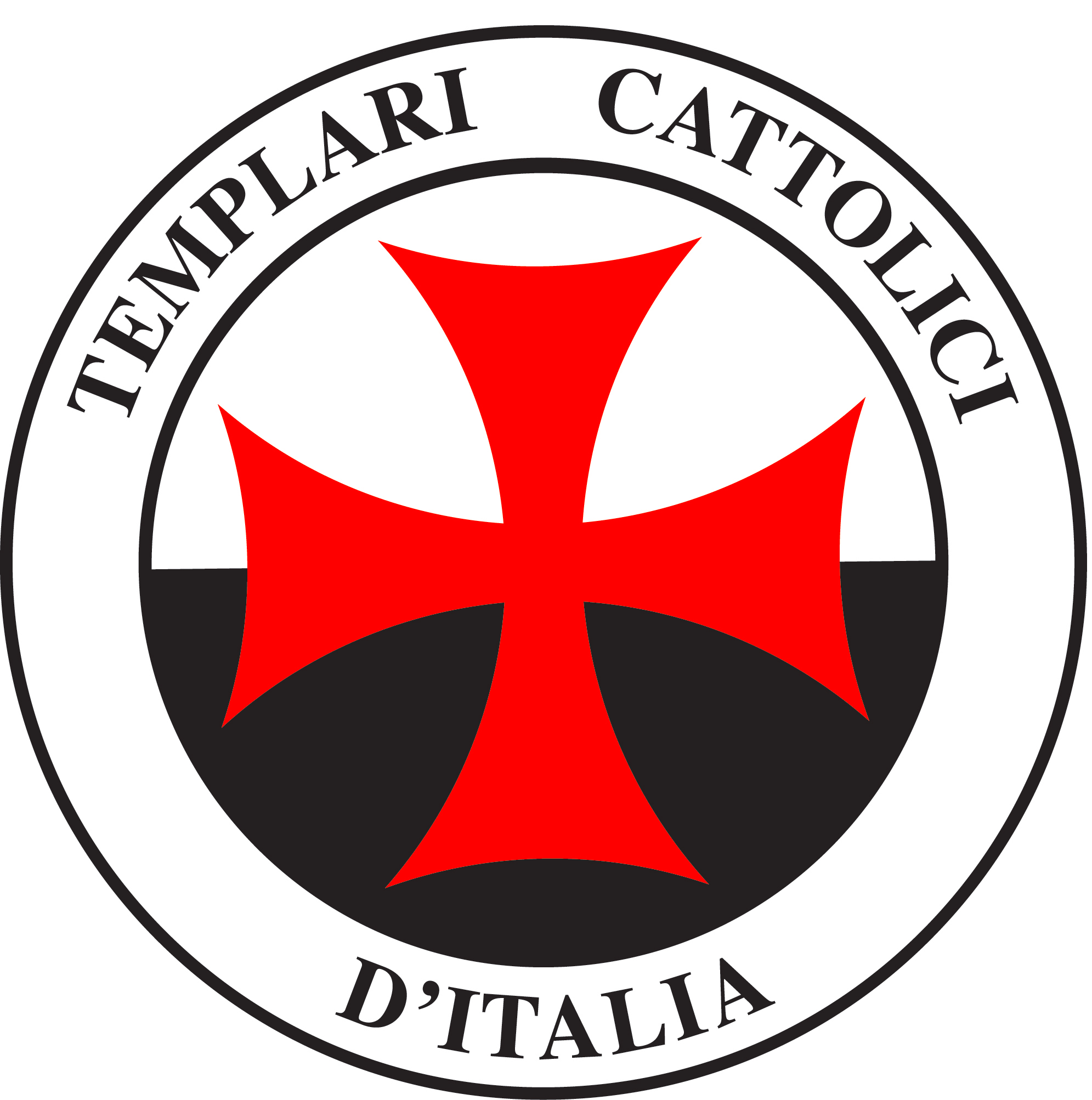
- Emblem of the Order
- Country: Italy
- Religious affiliation: Roman Catholic
- Eligibility: Catholics of 18 years of age and older
- Website: templars.global

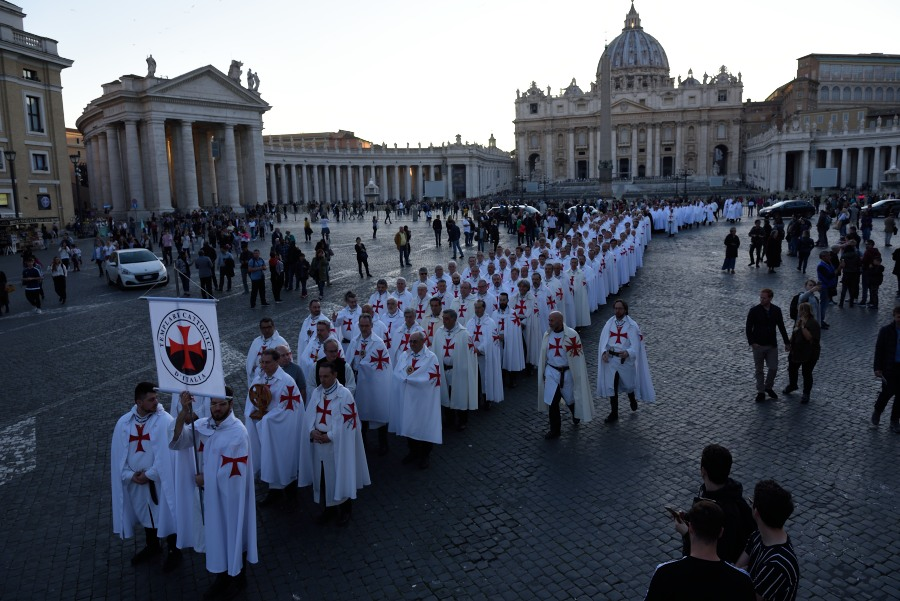
The Catholic Templars of Italy in spiritual retreat in the Vatican City, 2019

The Templari Cattolici d'Italia (Catholic Templars of Italy) is an organization laying claim to be successors to the Knights Templar, after the Templars denunciation on March 22, 1312, by the papal bull, Vox in excelso, issued by Pope Clement V. The Catholic Templars of Italy are a private association of Catholics established according to canons 215/216 – Titulus I, de omnium christifidelium obligationibus et iuribus; can. from 321 to 326 – Titulus V, Caput III, de christifidelium consociationibus privatis of the Code of Canon Law.

== History ==
The association comes to life at the beginning of the 21st century, starting from Northern Italy, and the headquarters are in the province of Parma at the church of Santa Maria Maddalena in the locality of Toccalmatto di Fontanellato. The previous location was in Verona at the church of San Fermo Maggiore.

Since 2012 the Catholic Templars of Italy have begun to obtain local recognition of consensus in various Italian dioceses. It has received authorization to operate through diocesan recognition by at least seven bishops of large Italian cities, including Verona, Naples, Ascoli Piceno and others. The order is often welcomed at the Vatican and have been a part of important events such as the "consecration of the world to the Immaculate Heart of Mary... [and] the voluntary service during the Extraordinary Jubilee of Mercy of 2016 and the Spiritual Retreat of 2018."

The organisation was dissolved by decision of Mgr Giuseppe Zenti of 2 February 2022.

== Grades and badges ==
- Armiger, first grade
- Miles, second grade
- Eques, third grade

=== Insignia ===
The white representing the Spirit is obviously above the black which represents matter, as well highlighted by the Templar frescoes of the counterface of St. Bevignate in Perugia in which the Knight Templar carries shield and bipartite beauceant in which the white is at the top and the black on the bottom.

=== Master General ===
#	Arms	Name	Time in office
1.		Mauro Giorgio Ferretti	1990–present

== Headquarters ==
- Chiesa di San Fermo Maggiore, via della Dogana, 2 – 37121, Verona, Italy

=== The discovery of the tomb of the Grand Master of the Knights Templar Arnold of Torroja ===
In 2018 a sarcophagus was discovered in the cloister of the church of San Fermo Maggiore, Verona, containing the remains of the Grand Master of the Knights Templar, Arnold of Torroja.

#	Arms	Name	Time in office
9.		Arnold of Torroja	1181–1184

== Locations ==
- Basilica di San Petronio, Bologna, Italy
- Abbazia di San Mercuriale, Forlì, Italy
- Chiesa dei Santi Pietro e Biagio, Cividale, Italy
- Chiesa di San Nicolò, Jesi, Italy
- Pieve di Santa Maria in acquedotto, Forlì, Italy
- Abbazia di Chiaravalle della Colomba, Alseno, Piacenza, Italy
- Sacra di San Michele, Turin, Italy
- Chiesa dell’Immacolata, Gorizia, Italy
- Beata Vergine Immacolata e S. Antonio, Milan, Italy
- Chiesa dei Santi Pietro e Paolo, Como, Italy
- Chiesa di San Michele Arcangelo, Cavaglià, Turin, Italy

=== Churches ===
- Santa Maria delle Mose, Piacenza, Italy
- Chiesa dell’antico villaggio di Canossa, Reggio Emilia, Italy
- Saint Anna, Busseto, Parma, Italy
- Santa Maria Maddalena, Cerro di Toccalmatto, Fontanellato, Parma, Italy
- Santa Maria di Mucciatella, Puianello di Quattro Castella, Reggio Emilia, Italy
- Santuario della Beata Vergine Maria del Suffragio dei Poveri, Piacenza, Italy
- Oratorio di Santa Maria Immacolata, Parma, Italy
- Chiesa di Santa Maria delle Grazie al Moiariello, Capodimonte, Naples, Italy
- Chiesa di San Vincenzo, Cremona, Italy

== See also ==
- Chinon Parchment
