= Non nobis =

Phrase

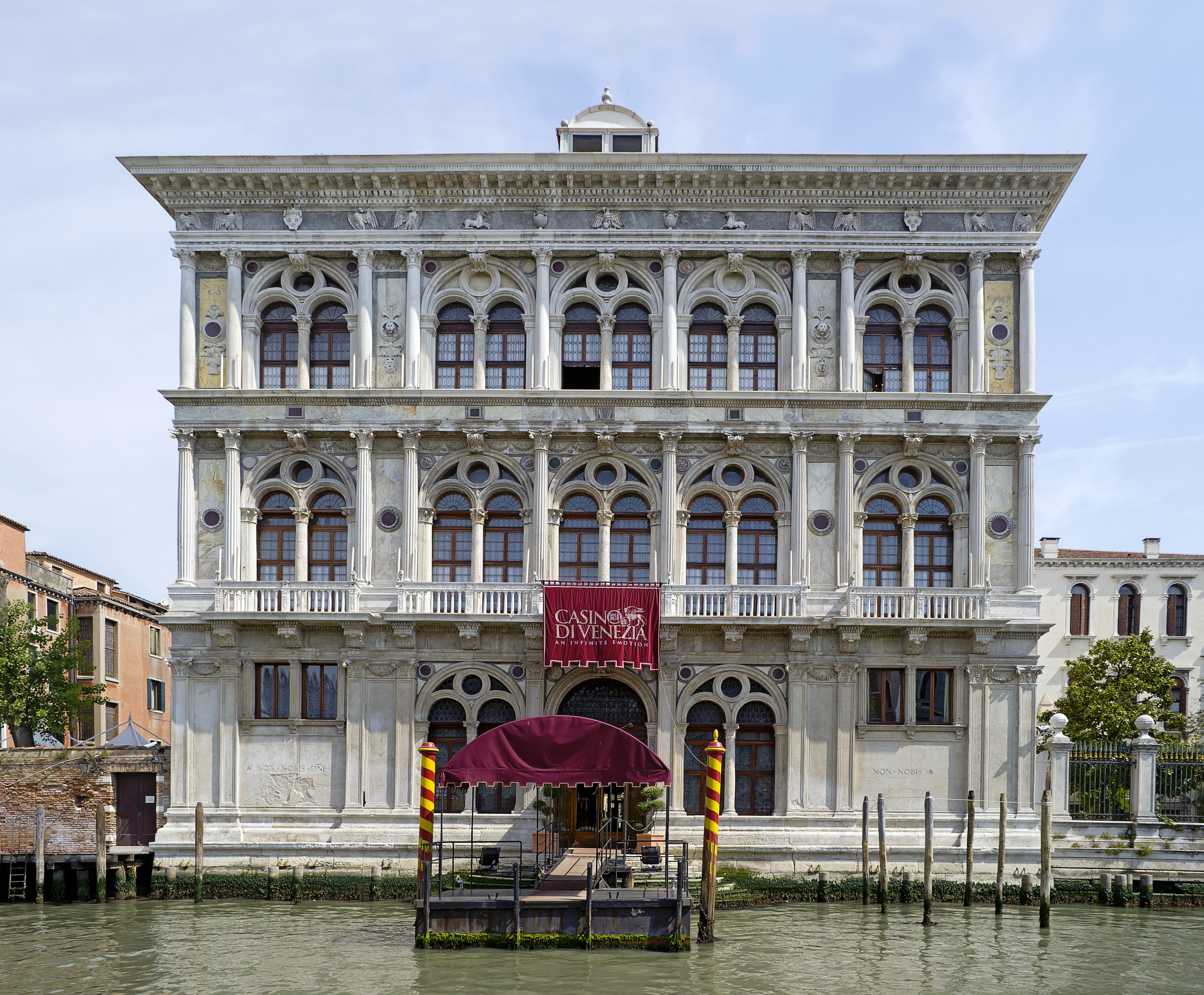
The Latin expression is inscribed on the façade of the Ca' Vendramin Calergi, a 15th-century Renaissance palace built for Andrea Loredan. The verse hence became a motto of the Loredan family as a whole.

Non nobis is the incipit and conventional title of a short Latin Christian hymn used as a prayer of thanksgiving and expression of humility. The Latin text is from the Vulgate translation of the Book of Psalms, Psalm 113:9 in Vulgate / Greek numbering (Psalm 115:1 in Hebrew numbering): Nōn nōbīs, Domine, nōn nōbīs, sed nōminī tuō dā glōriam (KJV: "Not unto us, O Lord, not unto us, but to thy name give the glory").

== History ==
=== Medieval ===
As part of Psalm 113 (In exitu Israel) it was recited liturgically as part of the Paschal vigil, the celebrants kneeling in a gesture of self-abasement when this verse was reached.

War flag of the Knights Templar

It was reported that the war flag of the Knights Templar, Baucent, had been inscribed with the verse.

=== Renaissance ===
Jean Mouton (c. 1459–1522) composed a motet to a text beginning with the Non nobis to celebrate the birth of Renée of France, a daughter to Louis XII and Anne of Brittany in 1510.

Non nobis Domine is now known in the form of a 16th-century canon derived from two passages in the motet Aspice Domine (a5) by the South Netherlandish lutenist and composer Philip van Wilder, who worked at the English court from c. 1520 until his death in 1554. Van Wilder's motet contains both the two related motifs which were apparently extracted from the motet by a later musician during the reign of Elizabeth I to form the canon subject. Although the two passages are not heard consecutively, they are linked as they both set the text phrase non est qui consoletur ("there is none to console [her]"), which was presumably the text to which the canon was originally sung.

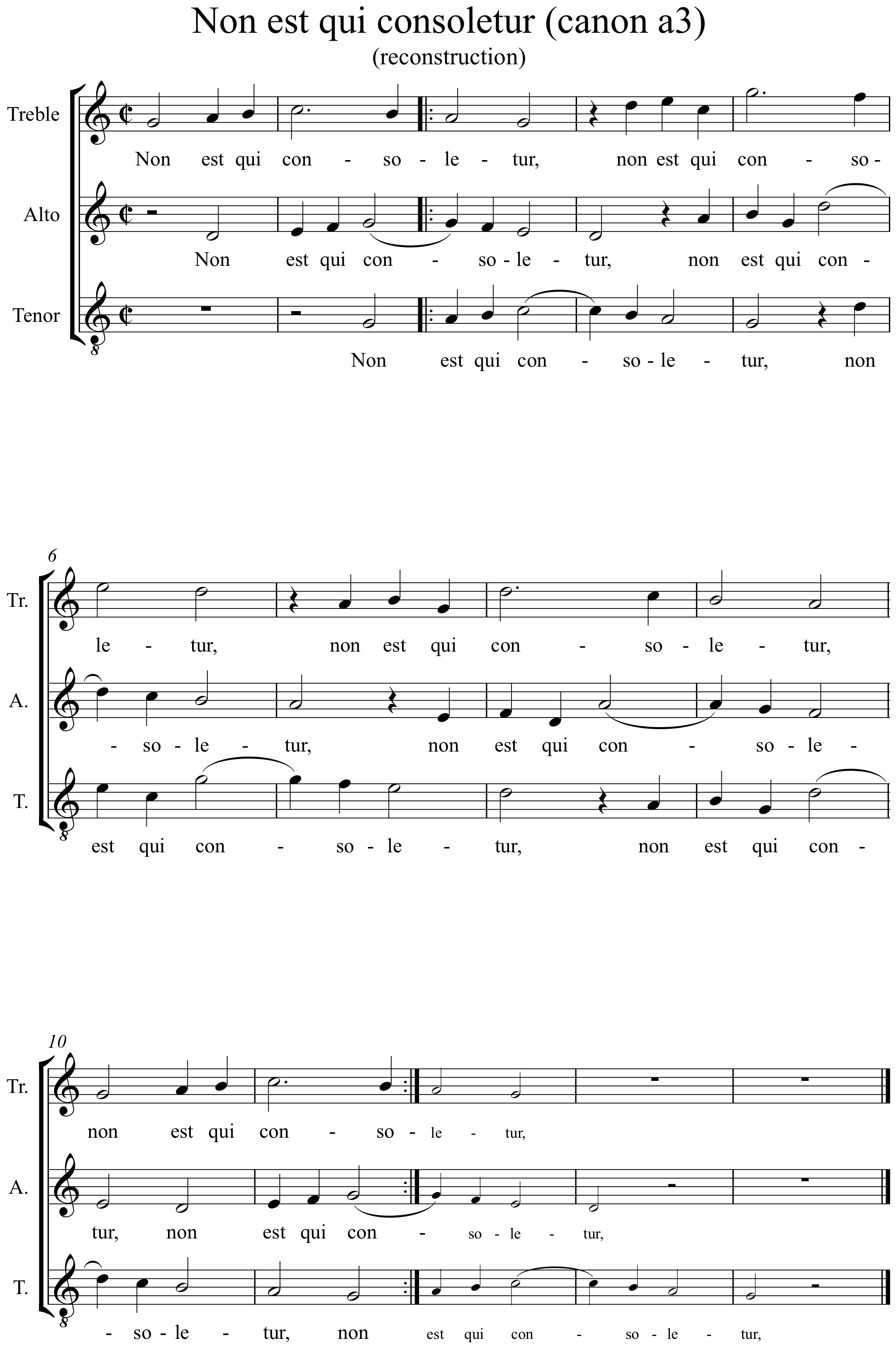
The' Non est qui consoletur' canon (reconstruction)

Van Wilder's motet was widely sung in Elizabethan recusant circles, and is preserved in as many as seven Tudor manuscripts.. It provided a model for William Byrd's famous Civitas sancti tui (Ne irascaris Domine Part II). One factor in its popularity was undoubtedly its text, a responsory from the Roman Breviary and Sarum Breviary which was sung during the weeks before Advent. It laments the desolation of the Holy City in language derived from Jeremiah:

Aspice Domine, quia facta est desolata civitas plena divitiis, sedet in tristitia domina gentium: non est qui consoletur eam, nisi tu Deus noster (2) Plorans ploravit in nocte, et lacrimae eius in maxillis eius. Non est qui consoletur eam, nisi tu Deus noster. [Translation:] Behold, Lord, for the city once full of riches is laid waste, she who ruled the peoples sits in sadness: there is none to console her but thou, our God. (2) She wept sorely in the night, and her tears were on her cheeks: there is none to console her but thou, our God.

Texts of this type (which also feature widely in Byrd's penitential and political motets of the 1580s) were widely read by the Elizabethan recusant community in contemporary terms as expressions of Catholic nostalgia for the old religious order. The Non est qui consoletur canon was probably widely sung in recusant circles with the same connotations. Although this version has not survived in written form, the canon subject was simple enough to have been memorized and transmitted orally.

=== Early modern period ===
The next stage in the development of the canon was the text substitution which occurred early in the 17th century. This is clear from the earliest known notated source, the so-called Bull MS (also known as Tisdale's Virginal Book) completed about 1620. There it is given with no text, but it is clear from the contour of the melody and the repeated notes that this version was designed to fit the Non nobis Domine text, which must have been in place by this time.

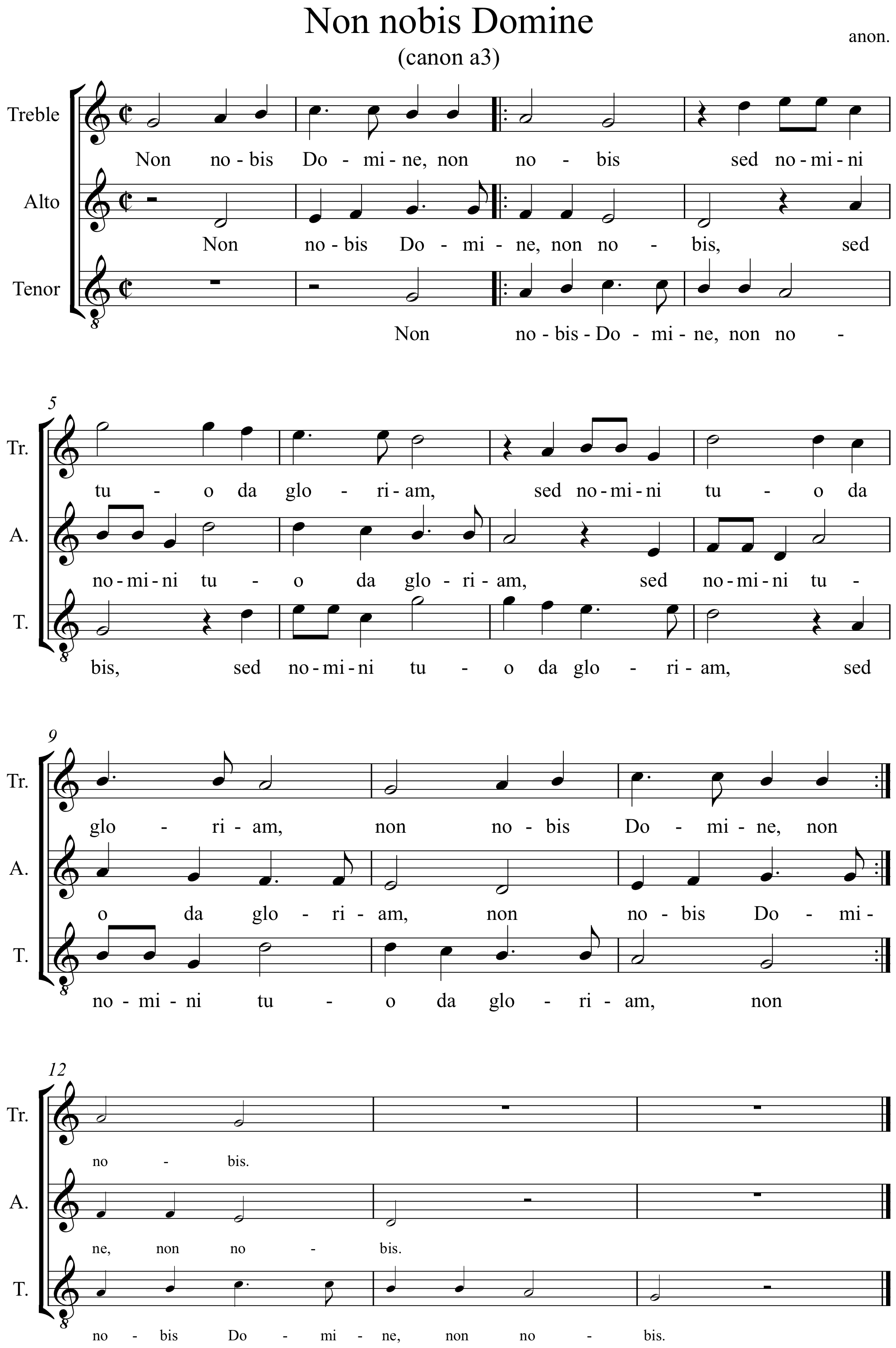
The 'Non nobis Domine canon

The new text had a liturgical significance for contemporary listeners which is not immediately obvious today. The words, which form the first verse of Psalm 115 in the Protestant translations of the Psalter, are quoted in the First Collect at Matins in the special Office of thanksgiving instituted by Act of the Parliament of Great Britain following the failure of the Gunpowder Plot in 1605 and added to the Book of Common Prayer.

ALMIGHTY God, who hast in all ages shewed thy power and mercy in the miraculous and gracious deliverance of thy Church, and in the protection of righteous and religious Kings and States, professing thy holy and eternal truth, from the wicked conspiracies and malicious practices of all the enemies thereof; We yield thee our unfeigned thanks and praise for the wonderful and mighty deliverance of our gracious Sovereign King James, the Queen, the Prince, and all the Royal Branches, with the Nobility, Clergy, and Commons of England, then assembled in Parliament, by Popish treachery appointed as sheep to the slaughter, in a most barbarous, and savage manner, beyond the examples of former ages. From this unnatural conspiracy, not our merit, but thy mercy; not our foresight, but thy providence, delivered us: And therefore, not unto us, O Lord, not unto us; but unto thy Name be ascribed all honour and glory in all Churches of the saints, from generation to generation, through Jesus Christ our Lord. Amen.

The psalm text, which forms a focus for the rest of the collect, supplies the background to the new version of the canon, which must have been sung in many loyal Protestant households on 5 November (the anniversary of the discovery of the plot) as an act of thanksgiving for deliverance and a counterblast to the Catholic version. The collect, which remained in the prayer book until 1859, would have served as a constant reminder of the patriotic associations of the Non nobis Domine canon: this does much to explain its continued popularity in the 18th and 19th centuries. The Matins service, and by association the canon, took on an additional layer of meaning in 1688, when William of Orange, with characteristic political astuteness, landed with his troops on November 5, thus creating an association in the popular imagination between William's invasion and the liberation of the realm from Popery, represented by his predecessor the Catholic King James II. A second collect, giving thanks for the Glorious Revolution, was then added to the service.

Non nobis Domine appeared in print in Playford's Musical Banquet (1651), Hilton's Catch that catch can (1652) and Playford's Introduction to the Skill of Musick (1655), in all three cases anonymously. In 1715 the musician and antiquarian Thomas Tudway attributed it to Thomas Morley (Lbm Harley 7337 f. -192v). Another antiquarian, the unreliable Johann Christoph Pepusch, printed it in his Treatise on Harmony (1730) with an attribution to Byrd which, though unfounded, has gained traditional acceptance. This attribution was repeated in the earliest known Continental source, Johann Mattheson's Der vollkommene Capellmeister (1739). The canon forms the basis of the first movement of Concerto III from a set of six Concerti armonici by Count Unico Wilhelm van Wassenaer (formerly attributed to Giovanni Battista Pergolesi or Carlo Ricciotti) published in The Hague in 1739, where it is labelled Canone di Palestrina, and it is printed as an appendix to a set of concertos by Richard Mudge published by John Walsh in 1749. There are surviving copies of the Non nobis Domine canon in the hands of both Mozart and Beethoven.

Shakespeare, in Henry V Act IV Scene 8, has the king proclaim the singing of both the Non nobis and the Te Deum after the victory at Agincourt. The canon is sung in the 1944 film of Henry V (starring Laurence Olivier) and also in the 1989 film of the same title (starring Kenneth Branagh), though we now know that the retexted version was not in existence as early as 1599, when the play was written. There is no stage direction in the play to indicate the singing of Non nobis Domine, but if Shakespeare had a specific setting in mind he was probably thinking anachronistically of a Protestant metrical psalm tune. However, in Hall's Chronicle (1542) Non nobis is sung as part of the complete psalm, presumably to plainsong or faburden.

When the kyng had passed through the felde & saw neither resistence nor apparaunce of any Frenchmen savyng the dead corsses [corpses], he caused the retrayte to be blowen and brought al his armie together about, iiij [4]. of the clocke at after noone. And fyrst to geve thankes to almightie God gever & tributor of this glorious victory, he caused his prelates & chapelaines fyrst to sing this psalme In exitu Israel de Egipto, commaundyng every man to knele doune on the ground at this verse. Non nobis domine, non nobis, sed nomini tuo da gloriam, whiche is to say in Englishe, Not to us lord, not to us, but to thy name let the glory be geven: whiche done he caused Te deum with certeine anthemes to be song gevyng laudes and praisynges to God, and not boastyng nor braggyng of him selfe nor his humane power.

=== Modern history ===
In England the canon came to form part of the repertory of glee clubs in the 18th and 19th centuries, and has traditionally been sung as a grace at public dinners. In the 20th century grace was said or sung before all meals at St Paul's Cathedral School, London, and grace on Sundays and feast days was the sung Non Nobis canon. In modern times it has been quoted by Michael Tippett in his Shires Suite (1970).

For the 1989 film adaptation of Shakespeare's Henry V by Kenneth Branagh, Patrick Doyle composed (and sang) a completely different setting that adapted the words slightly.

== Usage ==
Non nobis Domine is usually sung as a three-part perpetual canon with the two following voices entering at the lower fourth and lower octave in relation to the lead melody (dux). This is the version given in most of the early sources, but many other solutions are technically possible, a fact which has perhaps contributed much to its enduring appeal.

=== School hymn ===
- UK: Chatham and Clarendon Grammar School, Belfast High School, Foxford Community School, Jordanstown Schools, Denmark Road High School, Richard Challoner School, Leeds East Academy, Cockburn School, Ravens Wood School
  - Formerly: Coleraine High School, Craigholme School, Lady Edridge Grammar School for Girls, Purley County Grammar School for Girls, Cirencester Grammar School
- South Africa: St. Henry's Marist College
- USA: Covenant School (Texas), Trinity School of Durham and Chapel Hill
- Ireland: Mount Temple Comprehensive School
- Canada: St. Charles Garnier College
- Trinidad and Tobago: Bishop Anstey High School

=== School motto ===
- UK: Guildford County School, St. Catherine's School, Bramley

=== Miscellaneous ===
Non Nobis is also the name of a Portuguese hard rock/heavy metal record label founded in 1992 in Tomar, but today are based in Lisbon.

Non nobis Domine is the name of a community choir based in Shannon, County Clare, Ireland. The choir was formed at St. Patrick's Comprehensive School in 1967 and is directed (since formation) by Mr. Clem Garvey.
