= Knights Templar =

Catholic military order (1118-1312)

Knights Templar; (1118–1312); Poor Fellow-Soldiers of Christ and of the Temple of Solomon; Pauperes commilitones Christi Templique Salomonici Hierosolymitanis
- Baucent, the flag used by the Templars in battle
- Active: c. 1118 – c. 22 March 1312
- Allegiance: The Pope
- Type: Latin Catholic military order
- Role: Protection of the Christian pilgrims in Jerusalem (region); Shock troops
- Size: 15,000–20,000 members at peak, 10% of whom were knights
- Headquarters: Temple Mount, Jerusalem, Kingdom of Jerusalem
- Nickname: Order of Solomon's Temple
- Patron: Saint Bernard of Clairvaux
- Mottos: Non nobis, Domine, non nobis, sed Nomini tuo da gloriam; (English: Not to us, O Lord, not to us, but to Thy name give the glory)
- Attire: White mantle with a red cross pattée
- Mascot: Two knights riding a single horse
- Engagements: The Crusades: Battle of Teqoa (1138) Siege of Shaizar (1138) Siege of Damascus (1148) Siege of Ascalon (1153) Battle of Lake Huleh (1157) Battle of Montgisard (1177) Battle of Marj Ayyun (1179) Battle of Cresson (1187) Battle of Hattin (1187) Siege of Jerusalem (1187) Siege of Trapessac (1188) Siege of Safed (1188) Siege of Acre (1191) Battle of Arsuf (1191) Siege of Mount Tabor (1217) Battle of Fariskur (1219) Battle of Mansurah (1221) Battle of Hama (1230) Battle of Trapessac (1237) Battle of Legnica (1241) Battle of La Forbie (1244) Battle of Mansurah (1250) Battle of Fariskur (1250) Battle of the Orontes (1265) Siege of Safed (1266) Battle of Al-Ruways (1266) Fall of Beaufort Castle (1268) Battle of Qaqun (1271) Fall of Tripoli (1289) Siege of Acre (1291) Fall of Ruad (1302) Capture of Soure (1144) Siege of Tomar (1190) Battle of Las Navas de Tolosa (1212) Siege of Alcácer do Sal (1217) Conquest of Majorca (1228)

Commanders
- First Grand master: Hugues de Payens
- Last grand master: Jacques de Molay

The Poor Fellow-Soldiers of Christ and of the Temple of Solomon, mainly known as the Knights Templar, was a military order of the Catholic faith, and one of the most important military orders in Western Christianity. They were founded in 1118 to defend pilgrims on their way to Jerusalem, with their headquarters located there on the Temple Mount, and existed for nearly two centuries during the Middle Ages.

Officially endorsed by the Catholic Church by such decrees as the papal bull Omne datum optimum of Innocent II, the Templars became a favoured charity throughout Christendom and grew rapidly in membership and power. The Templar knights, in their distinctive white mantles with a red cross, were among the most skilled fighting units of the Crusades. They were prominent in Christian finance; non-combatant members of the order, who made up as much as 90% of their members, managed a large economic infrastructure throughout Christendom. They developed innovative financial techniques that were an early form of banking, building a network of nearly 1,000 commanderies and fortifications across Europe and the Holy Land.

The Templars were closely tied to the Crusades. As they became unable to secure their holdings in the Holy Land, support for the order faded. In 1307, King Philip IV of France had many of the order's members in France arrested, tortured into giving false confessions, and then burned at the stake. Under pressure from Philip, Pope Clement V disbanded the order in 1312. In spite of its dissolution, however, between 1317 and 1319, a number of Templar knights, properties and other assets were absorbed within the Portuguese Order of Christ, and the Spanish Order of Montesa; the abrupt disappearance of this major medieval European institution in its original incarnation gave rise to speculation and legends, which have currently kept the "Templar" name alive in self-styled orders and popular culture.

== Names ==
The Poor Fellow-Soldiers of Christ and of the Temple of Solomon (Latin: Pauperes commilitones Christi Templique Salomonici and French: Pauvres Chevaliers du Christ et du Temple de Salomon) are also known as the Order of Solomon's Temple, and mainly the Knights Templar (French: Les Chevaliers Templiers), or simply the Templars (French: Les Templiers).

The Temple Mount where they had their headquarters had a mystique because it was above what was believed to be the ruins of the Temple of Solomon.

== History ==
=== Rise ===
After the Franks in the First Crusade captured Jerusalem from the Fatimid Caliphate in 1099, many Christians made pilgrimages to various sacred sites in the Holy Land. Although the city of Jerusalem was relatively secure under Christian control, the rest of Outremer was not. Bandits and marauding highwaymen preyed upon these Christian pilgrims, who were routinely slaughtered, sometimes by the hundreds, as they attempted to make the journey from the coastline at Jaffa through to the interior of the Holy Land.

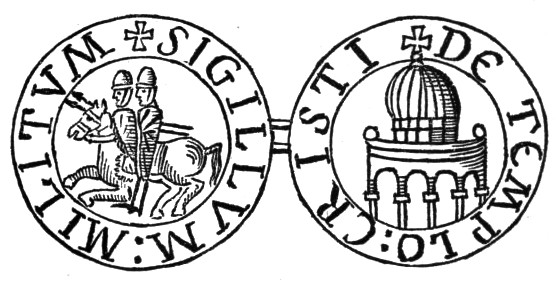
A Seal of the Knights Templar

In 1119, the French knight Hugues de Payens approached King Baldwin II of Jerusalem and Warmund, Patriarch of Jerusalem, and proposed creating a monastic Catholic religious order for the protection of these pilgrims. King Baldwin and Patriarch Warmund agreed to the request, probably at the Council of Nablus in January 1120, and the king granted the Templars a headquarters in a wing of the royal palace on the Temple Mount in the captured Al-Aqsa Mosque.

The order, with about nine knights including Godfrey de Saint-Omer and André de Montbard, had few financial resources and relied on donations to survive. Their emblem was of two knights riding on a single horse, emphasizing the order's poverty.

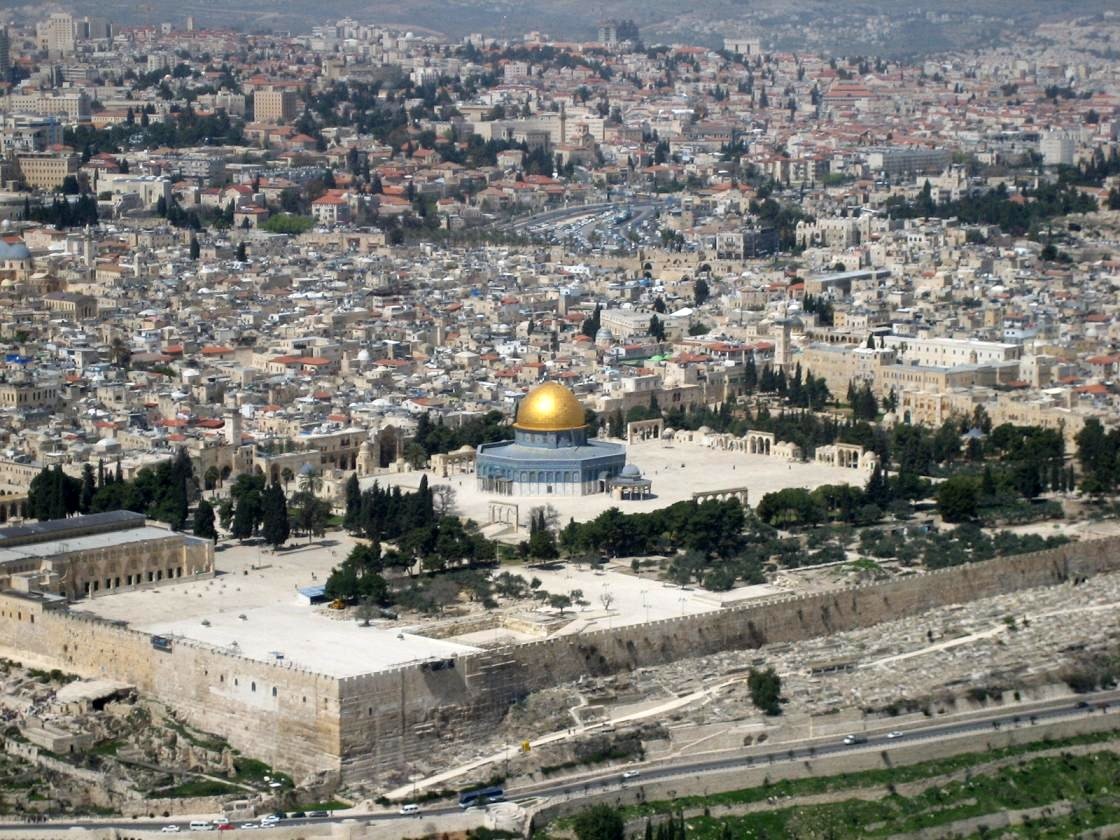
The first headquarters of the Knights Templar, on the Temple Mount in Jerusalem. The Crusaders called it "the Temple of Solomon" and from this location derived their name of Templar.

The impoverished status of the Templars did not last long. They had a powerful advocate in Saint Bernard of Clairvaux, a leading Church figure, the French abbot primarily responsible for the founding of the Cistercian Order of monks and a nephew of André de Montbard, one of the founding knights. Bernard put his weight behind them and wrote persuasively on their behalf in the letter In Praise of the New Knighthood, and in 1129, at the Council of Troyes, he led a group of leading churchmen to officially approve and endorse the order on behalf of the church. With this formal blessing, the Templars became a favoured charity throughout Christendom, receiving money, land, businesses, and noble-born sons from families who were eager to help with the fight in the Holy Land. At the Council of Pisa in 1135, Pope Innocent II initiated the first papal monetary donation to the Order. Another major benefit came in 1139, when Innocent II's papal bull Omne Datum Optimum exempted the order from obedience to local laws. This ruling meant that the Templars could pass freely through all borders, were not required to pay any taxes and were exempt from all authority except that of the pope. However, in practice, they often had to respect the wishes of the European rulers in whose kingdoms they resided, especially in their handling of funds for the local nobility in their banks.

With its clear mission and ample resources, the order grew rapidly. Templars were often the advance shock troops in key battles of the Crusades, as the heavily armoured knights on their warhorses would charge into enemy lines ahead of the main army. One of their most famous victories was in 1177 during the Battle of Montgisard, where some 500 Templar knights helped several thousand infantry to defeat Saladin's army of more than 26,000 soldiers. (Note: The Latin estimates of Saladin's army are no doubt greatly exaggerated (26,000 in Tyre xxi. 23; 12,000 Turks and 9,000 Arabs in Anon.Rhen. v. 517).)

A Templar Knight is truly a fearless knight, and secure on every side, for his soul is protected by the armour of faith, just as his body is protected by the armour of steel. He is thus doubly armed, and need fear neither demons nor men.

— Bernard of Clairvaux, c. 1135
De Laude Novae Militae – In Praise of the New Knighthood

Although the primary mission of the order was military, relatively few members were combatants. The majority acted in support positions to assist the knights and manage their financial infrastructure. Although individual members were sworn to poverty, the Templar Order controlled vast wealth even beyond direct donations. A nobleman participating in the Crusades might place all his assets under Templar management during his absence. Accumulating wealth in this manner throughout Christendom and the Outremer, in 1150 the order began to issue letters of credit for pilgrims journeying to the Holy Land: pilgrims deposited their valuables with a local Templar preceptory before embarking, received a document indicating the value of their deposit, then showed that document upon arrival in the Holy Land to claim treasure of equal value to their funds. This innovative arrangement was an early form of banking and may have been the first use of bank cheques; it protected pilgrims from robbery, while augmenting Templar finances.

Based on this mix of donations and business dealings, the Templars established financial networks across the whole of Christendom. They acquired large tracts of land, both in Europe and the Middle East; they bought and managed farms and vineyards; they built massive stone cathedrals and castles; they were involved in manufacturing, import, and export; they owned fleets of ships; and at one point they even owned the entire island of Cyprus. The order arguably qualifies as the world's first multinational corporation. By the late 12th century the Templars were also politically powerful in the Holy Land. Secular nobles in the Kingdom of Jerusalem began granting them castles and surrounding lands as a defense against the growing threat of the Zengids in Syria. The Templars were even allowed to negotiate with Muslim rulers independently of the feudal lords. The Templar castles became de facto independent lordships with their own markets, further growing their political authority. During the regency after the death of King Baldwin IV in 1185, the royal castles were placed in the custody of the Templars and Hospitallers: the grand masters of the two orders, along with the patriarch of Jerusalem, each had a key to the crown jewels.

From the mid-12th century, the Templars were recruited (jointly with the Hospitallers) to fight the Muslim kingdoms in the Iberian Peninsula, in addition to their campaigns in the Latin East. In the kingdoms of Castile and León, they obtained some major strongholds (such as Calatrava la Vieja or Coria), but their vulnerability along the border was exposed during the Almohad offensive. In Aragon, the Templars subsumed the Order of Mountjoy in the late 12th century, becoming an important vanguard force on the border, while in Portugal they commanded some castles along the Tagus line. One of these was Tomar, which was unsuccessfully besieged by the Almohad Caliphate in 1190.

Due to the expense of sending a third of their revenues to the East, Templar and Hospitaller activities in the Iberian Peninsula were at a disadvantage to the Hispanic military orders which expended all their resources in the region.

=== War ===
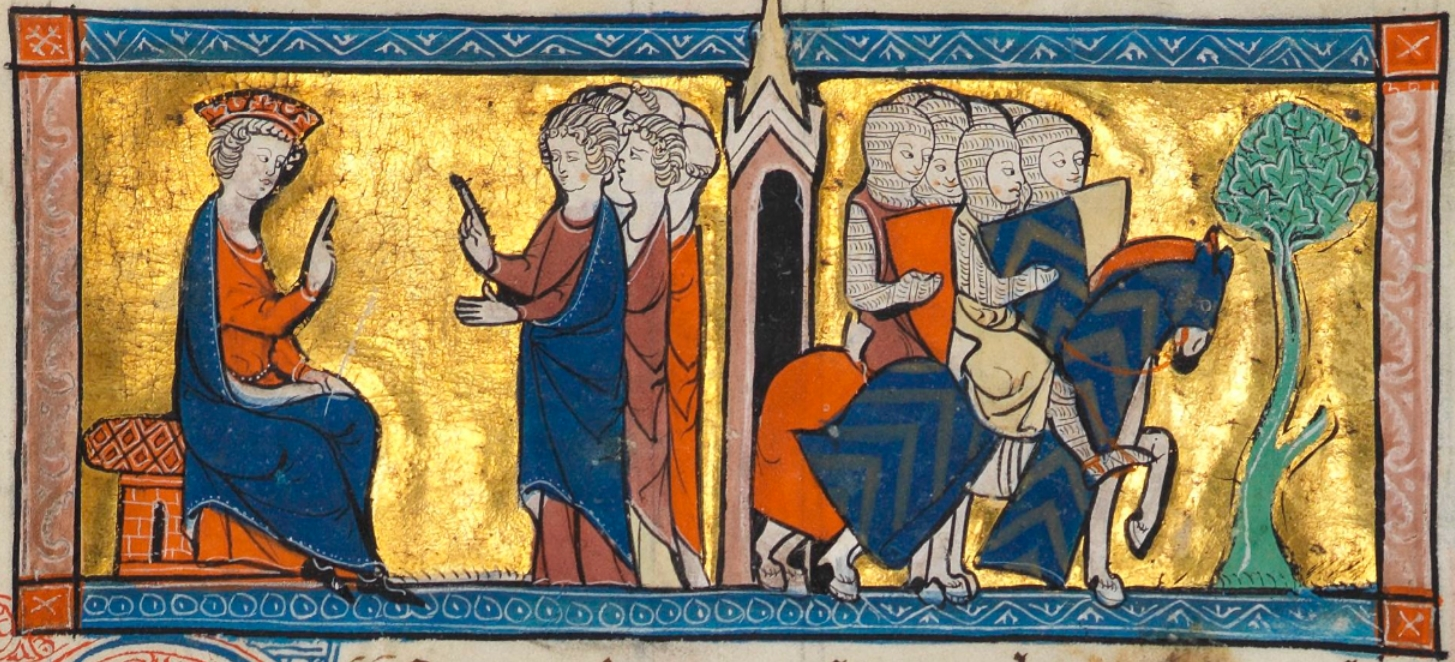
King Baldwin II presiding over a council with the Templars

Accounts of the Order's early military activities in the Levant are vague, though it appears their first battles were defeats, because the Seljuk Turks and other Muslim powers used different tactics from those in Europe at that time. The Templars later adapted to this and became strategic advisors to the leaders of the Crusader states. The first recorded battle involving the Knights Templar was in the town of Teqoa, south of Jerusalem, in 1138. A force of Templars led by their grand master, Robert de Craon (who succeeded Hugues de Payens about a year earlier), was sent to retake the town after it was captured by Muslims. They were initially successful, but the Muslims regrouped outside the town and were able to take it back from the Templars.

The Order's mission developed from protecting pilgrims to taking part in regular military campaigns early on, and this is shown by the fact that the first castle received by the Knights Templar was located four hundred miles north of the pilgrim road from Jaffa to Jerusalem, on the northern frontier of the Principality of Antioch: the castle of Bagras in the Amanus Mountains. It may have been as early as 1131, and by 1137 at the latest, that the Templars were given the mountainous region that formed the border of Antioch and Cilician Armenia, which included the castles of Bagras, Darbsak, and Roche de Roissel. The Templars were there when Byzantine emperor John II Komnenos tried to make the Crusader states of Antioch, Tripoli, and Edessa his vassals between 1137 and 1142. Templar knights accompanied John II Komnenos with troops from those states during his campaign against Muslim powers in Syria from 1137 to 1138, including at the sieges of Aleppo and Shaizar. In 1143, the Templars also began taking part in the Reconquista in Iberia at the request of the count of Barcelona.

In 1147 a force of French, Spanish, and English Templars left France to join the Second Crusade, led by King Louis VII. At a meeting held in Paris on 27 April 1147 they were given permission by Pope Eugenius III to wear the red cross on their uniforms. They were led by the Templar provincial master in France, Everard des Barres, who was one of the ambassadors King Louis sent to negotiate the passage of the Crusader army through the Byzantine Empire on its way to the Holy Land. During the dangerous journey of the Second Crusade through Anatolia, the Templars provided security to the rest of the army from Turkish raids. After the Crusaders arrived in 1148, the kings Louis VII, Conrad III of Germany, and Baldwin III of Jerusalem made the decision to capture Damascus, but their siege in the summer of that year failed and ended with the defeat of the Christian army. In the fall of 1148 some returning Templars took part in the successful siege of Tortosa in Spain, after which one-fifth of that city was given to the Order.

Robert de Craon died in January 1149 and was succeeded as grand master by Everard des Barres, one of the few leaders at the siege of Damascus whose reputation was not damaged by the event. After the Second Crusade, Zengid forces under Nur ad-Din Zengi of Aleppo attacked the Principality of Antioch, and in June 1149 his army defeated the Crusaders at the Battle of Inab, where Prince Raymond of Antioch was killed. King Baldwin III led reinforcements to the principality, which led Nur ad-Din to accept a truce with Antioch and not advance any further. The force with King Baldwin included 120 Templar knights and 1,000 sergeants and squires.

In the winter of 1149 and 1150, King Baldwin III oversaw the reconstruction of the fortress at Gaza City, which had been left in ruins. It was part of the ring of castles that were built along the southern border of the Kingdom of Jerusalem to protect it from raids by the Egyptian Fatimid Caliphate, and specifically from the Fatimid troops at the fortress of Ascalon, which by then was the last coastal city in the Levant still under Muslim control. Gaza was given to the Knights Templar, becoming the first major Templar castle. In 1152 Everard stepped down as grand master for unknown reasons, and his successor was Bernard de Tremelay. In January of the following year, Bernard led the Templars when King Baldwin III led a Crusader army to besiege Ascalon. Several months of fighting went by until the wall of the city was breached in August 1153, at which point Bernard led forty knights into Ascalon. But the rest of the army did not join them and all of the Templars were killed by the Muslim defenders. Ascalon was captured by the rest of the army several days later, and Bernard was eventually succeeded by André de Montbard.

After the fall of Ascalon, the Templars continued operating in that region from their castle at Gaza. In June 1154 they attacked Abbas ibn Abi al-Futuh, the vizier of Egypt, when he tried to flee from Cairo to Damascus after losing a power struggle. Abbas was killed and the Templars captured his son, whom they later sent back to the Fatimids. In the late 1150s the Egyptians launched raids against the Crusaders in the areas of Gaza and Ascalon.

=== Decline ===
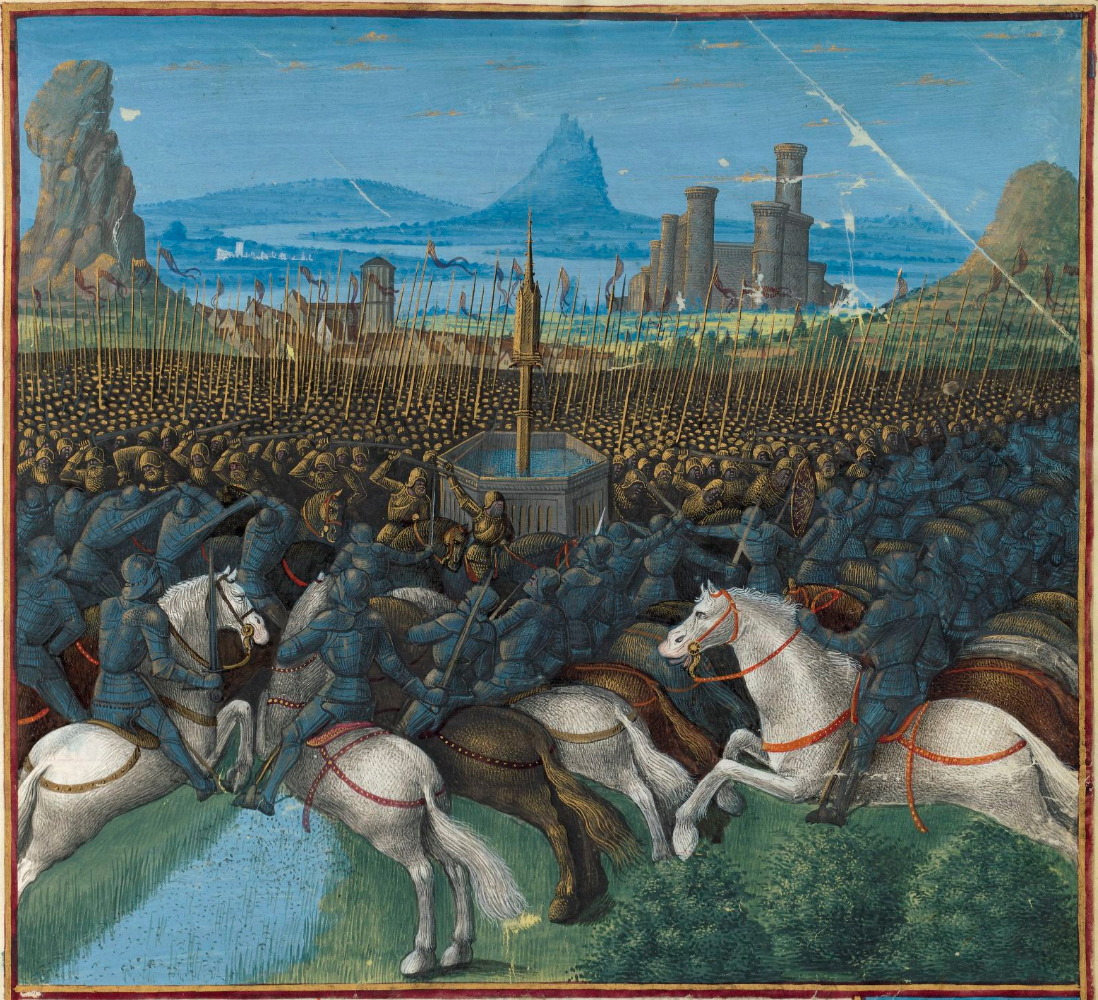
Battle of Hattin in 1187, the turning point leading to the Third Crusade. From a copy of the Passages d'outremer, c. 1490

In the mid-12th century, the tide began to turn in the Crusades. The Islamic world had become more united under effective leaders such as Saladin, and the reborn Sunni regime in Egypt. Dissension arose among Christian factions in and concerning the Holy Land. The Knights Templar were occasionally at odds with the two other Christian military orders, the Knights Hospitaller and the Teutonic Knights, and decades of internecine feuds weakened Christian positions, both politically and militarily. After the Templars were involved in several unsuccessful campaigns, including the pivotal Battle of Hattin, Jerusalem was recaptured by Muslim forces under Saladin in 1187. The Holy Roman Emperor Frederick II reclaimed the city for Christians in the Sixth Crusade of 1229, without Templar aid, but only held it for a little more than a decade. In 1244, the Ayyubid dynasty together with Khwarezmi mercenaries recaptured Jerusalem, and the city did not return to Western control until 1917 when, during World War I, the British captured it from the Ottoman Empire.

The Templars were forced to relocate their headquarters to other cities in the north, such as the seaport of Acre, which they held for the next century. It was lost in 1291, followed by their last mainland strongholds, Tortosa (Tartus in present-day Syria) and Atlit (in present-day Israel). Their headquarters then moved to Limassol on the island of Cyprus, and they also attempted to maintain a garrison on tiny Arwad Island, just off the coast from Tortosa. In 1300, there was some attempt to engage in coordinated military efforts with the Mongols via a new invasion force at Arwad. In 1302 or 1303, however, the Templars lost the island to the Egyptian Mamluk Sultanate in the siege of Arwad. With the island gone, the Crusaders lost their last foothold in the Holy Land.

With the order's military mission now less important, support for the organization began to dwindle. The situation was complex, however, since during the two hundred years of their existence, the Templars had become a part of daily life throughout Christendom. The organization's Templar Houses, hundreds of which were dotted throughout Europe and the Near East, gave them a widespread presence at the local level. The Templars still managed many businesses, and many Europeans had daily contact with the Templar network, such as by working at a Templar farm or vineyard, or using the order as a bank in which to store personal valuables. The order was still not subject to local government, making it everywhere a "state within a state" – its standing army, although it no longer had a well-defined mission, could pass freely through all borders. This situation heightened tensions with some European nobility, especially as the Templars were indicating an interest in founding their own monastic state, just as the Teutonic Knights had done in Prussia and the Baltic and the Knights Hospitaller were doing in Rhodes.

The Templars were accused of enabling corruption in their ranks which often allowed them to influence the legal systems of Europe to act in their favor and gain influence over local rulers' lands at the expense of the rulers.

=== Arrests, charges and dissolution ===
In 1305, the new Pope Clement V, based in Avignon, France, sent letters to both the Templar Grand Master Jacques de Molay and the Hospitaller Grand Master Fulk de Villaret to discuss the possibility of merging the two orders. Neither was amenable to the idea, but Pope Clement persisted, and in 1306 he invited both grand masters to France to discuss the matter. De Molay arrived first in early 1307, but de Villaret was delayed for several months. While waiting, de Molay and Clement discussed criminal charges that had been made two years earlier by an ousted Templar and were being discussed by King Philip IV of France and his ministers. It was generally agreed that the charges were false, but Clement sent King Philip a written request for assistance in the investigation. According to some historians, Philip, who was already deeply in debt to the Templars from his war against England, decided to seize upon the rumours for his own purposes. He began pressuring the church to take action against the order, as a way of freeing himself from his debts.

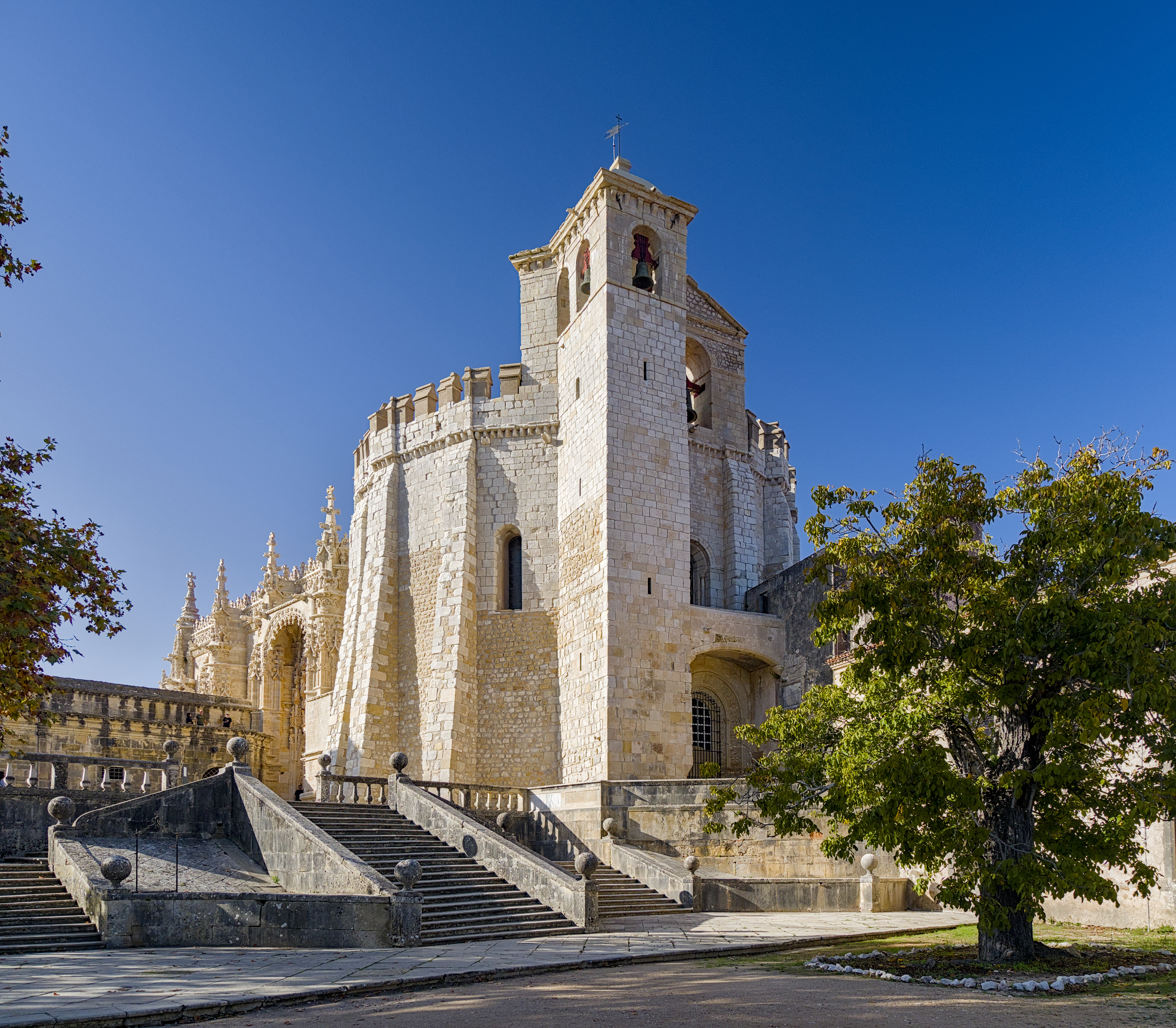
Convent of Christ Castle, Tomar, Portugal. Built in 1160 as a stronghold for the Knights Templar and besieged in 1190 by the Almohads, it became the headquarters of the renamed Order of Christ. In 1983, it was named a UNESCO World Heritage Site.

At dawn on Friday, 13 October 1307, King Philip IV had de Molay and scores of other French Templars simultaneously arrested. The arrest warrant started with the words: "Dieu n'est pas content, nous avons des ennemis de la foi dans le Royaume" ("God is not pleased. We have enemies of the faith in the kingdom.").

Claims were made that during Templar admissions ceremonies, recruits were forced to spit on the Cross, deny Christ, and engage in indecent kissing; brethren were also accused of worshipping idols, and the order was said to have encouraged homosexual practices. Many of these allegations contain tropes that bear similarities to accusations made against other persecuted groups such as Jews, heretics, and accused witches. These allegations, though, were highly politicised without any real evidence. Still, the Templars were charged with numerous other offences such as financial corruption, fraud, and secrecy. Many of the accused confessed to these charges under torture, and their confessions, even though obtained under duress, caused a scandal in Paris. The prisoners were coerced to confess that they had spat on the Cross. One said: "Moi, Raymond de La Fère, 21 ans, reconnais que [j'ai] craché trois fois sur la Croix, mais de bouche et pas de cœur" ("I, Raymond de La Fère, 21 years old, admit that I have spat three times on the Cross, but only from my mouth and not from my heart"). The Templars were accused of idolatry and were charged with worshipping either a figure known as Baphomet or a mummified severed head they recovered, amongst other artefacts, at their original headquarters on the Temple Mount. Some have theorised that this head might have been believed to be that of John the Baptist, among other things.

Relenting to King Phillip's demands, Pope Clement then issued the papal bull Pastoralis praeeminentiae on 22 November 1307, which instructed all Christian monarchs in Europe to arrest all Templars and seize their assets. Clement called for papal hearings to determine the Templars' guilt or innocence, and once freed, many Templars recanted their confessions.

Several Templars are listed as having come from Gisors to defend the Order on 26 February 1310: Henri Zappellans or Chapelain, Anceau de Rocheria, Enard de Valdencia, Guillaume de Roy, Geoffroy de Cera or de La Fere-en-Champagne, Robert Harle or de Hermenonville, and Dreux de Chevru. Some had sufficient legal experience to defend themselves in the trials, but in 1310, having appointed the archbishop of Sens, Philippe de Marigny, to lead the investigation, Philip blocked this attempt, using the previously forced confessions to have dozens of Templars burned at the stake in Paris.

With Philip threatening military action unless the pope complied with his wishes, Clement finally agreed to disband the order, citing the public scandal that had been generated by the confessions. At the Council of Vienne in 1312, he issued a series of papal bulls, including Vox in excelso, which officially dissolved the order, and Ad providam, which turned over most Templar assets to the Hospitallers.

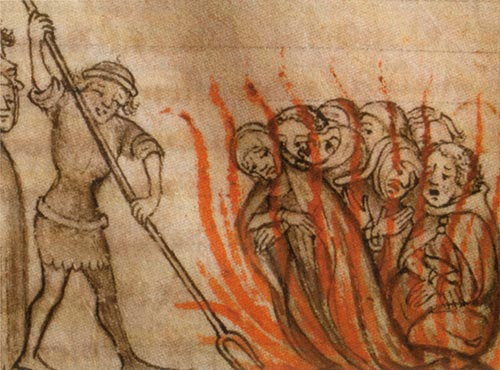
Templars being burned

As for the leaders of the order, the elderly Grand Master Jacques de Molay, who had confessed under torture, retracted his confession. Geoffroi de Charney, Preceptor of Normandy, also retracted his confession and insisted on his innocence. Both men, under pressure from the king, were declared guilty of being relapsed heretics and sentenced to burn alive at the stake in Paris on 18 March 1314. De Molay reportedly remained defiant to the end, asking to be tied in such a way that he could face the Notre Dame Cathedral and hold his hands together in prayer. According to legend, he called out from the flames that both Pope Clement and King Philip would soon meet him before God. His actual words were recorded on the parchment as follows: "Dieu sait qui a tort et a péché. Il va bientôt arriver malheur à ceux qui nous ont condamnés à mort" ("God knows who is wrong and has sinned. Soon a calamity will occur to those who have condemned us to death"). Clement died only a month later, and Philip died while hunting within the same year.

The remaining Templars around Europe were either arrested and tried under the Papal investigation (with virtually none convicted), absorbed into other Catholic military orders, or pensioned off and allowed to live out their days peacefully. By papal decree, the property of the Templars was transferred to the Knights Hospitaller except in the Kingdoms of Castile, Aragon, and Portugal. Portugal was the first country in Europe where they had settled, occurring only two or three years after the order's foundation in Jerusalem and even having a presence during Portugal's conception.

The Portuguese king, Denis I, refused to pursue and persecute the former knights, as had occurred in some other states under the influence of Philip and the crown. Under his protection, Templar organizations simply changed their name, from "Knights Templar" to the reconstituted Order of Christ and also a parallel Supreme Order of Christ of the Holy See; both are considered successors to the Knights Templar.

=== Chinon Parchment ===
In September 2001, a document known as the Chinon Parchment dated 17–20 August 1308 was discovered in the Vatican Archives by Barbara Frale, apparently after having been filed in the wrong place in 1628. It is a record of the trial of the Templars and shows that Clement absolved the Templars of all heresies in 1308 before formally disbanding the order in 1312, as did another Chinon Parchment dated 20 August 1308 addressed to Philip IV of France, also mentioning that all Templars that had confessed to heresy were "restored to the Sacraments and to the unity of the Church". This other Chinon Parchment has been well known to historians, having been published by Étienne Baluze in 1693 and by Pierre Dupuy in 1751.

The current position of the Catholic Church is that the persecution of the Knights Templar was unjust, that nothing was inherently wrong with the order or its rule, and that Pope Clement V was pressed into his actions by the magnitude of the public scandal and by the dominating influence of King Philip IV.

== Organization ==
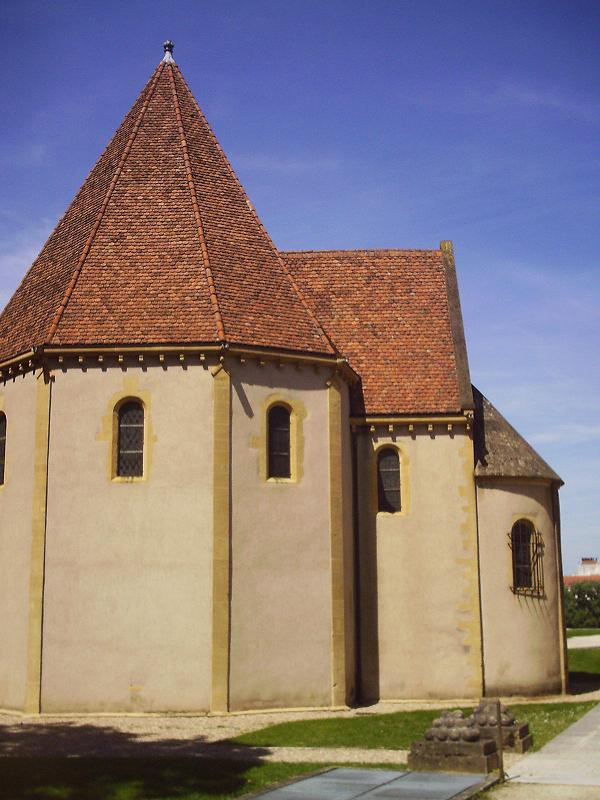
Templar chapel from the 12th century in Metz, France. Once part of the Templar commandery of Metz, the oldest Templar institution of the Holy Roman Empire.

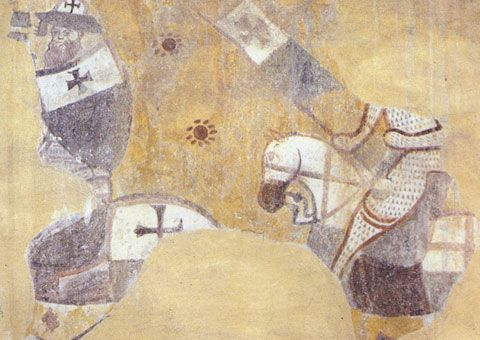
Fragment of the fresco at San Bevignate, Italy, showing a battle between Templars and Saracens, one of the oldest depictions of the knights, c. 1290

The Templars were organised as a monastic order similar to Bernard's Cistercian Order, which was considered the first effective international organization in Europe. The organizational structure had a strong chain of authority. Each country with a major Templar presence (France, Poitou, Anjou, Jerusalem, England, Spain, Portugal, Italy, Tripoli, Antioch, Hungary, and Croatia) had a master of the Order for the Templars in that region.

All of them were subject to the grand master, appointed for life, who oversaw both the order's military efforts in the East and their financial holdings in the West. The grand master exercised his authority via the visitors-general of the order, who were knights specially appointed by the grand master and convent of Jerusalem to visit the different provinces, correct malpractices, introduce new regulations, and resolve important disputes. The visitors-general had the power to remove knights from office and to suspend the master of the province concerned.

The central headquarters of the Templars had several offices that answered to the grand master. These were held as temporary appointments rather than for life. The second-in-command of the Order was the seneschal. The highest ranking military official was the marshal, while the preceptor (who was also sometimes called the commander) was responsible for the administration and provisions. The draper was responsible for their uniforms, the treasurer was in charge of finance, the turcopolier commanded auxiliary forces, and the prior was the head of the church at the headquarters. The headquarters and its most senior officials were known as the convent and its role was to assist and advise the grand master with running the administration of the Order.

No precise numbers exist, but it is estimated that at the order's peak, there were between 15,000 and 20,000 Templars, of whom about a tenth were actual knights.

=== Ranks within the order ===
==== Three main ranks ====
There was a threefold division of the ranks of the Templars: the noble knights, the non-noble sergeants, and the chaplains. The knights wore white mantles to symbolise their purity and chastity. The sergeants wore black or brown. All three classes of brothers wore the order's red cross. Before they received their monastic rule in 1129 at the Council of Troyes, the Templars were referred to only as knights (milites in Latin), and after 1129 they were also called brothers of their monastic order. Therefore the three main ranks were eventually known as knight brothers, sergeant brothers, and chaplain brothers. Knights and chaplains were referred to as brothers by 1140, but sergeants were not full members of the Order until the 1160s.

The knights were the most visible division of the order. They were equipped as heavy cavalry, with three or four horses and one or two squires. Squires were generally not members of the order but were instead outsiders who were hired for a set period of time. The Templars did not perform knighting ceremonies, so anyone wishing to become a knight in the Templar order had to be a knight already.

Beneath the knights in the order and drawn from non-noble families were the sergeants. They brought vital skills and trades from blacksmiths and builders, including the administration of many of the order's European properties. In the Crusader states, they fought alongside the knights as light cavalry with a single horse. Several of the order's most senior positions were reserved for sergeants, including the post of Commander of the Vault of Acre, who also served as the Templar fleet's admiral. But he was subordinated to the Order's preceptor instead of the marshal, indicating that the Templars considered their ships to be mainly for commerce rather than military purposes.

From 1139, chaplains constituted a third Templar rank. They were ordained priests who cared for the Templars' spiritual needs. These Templar clerics were also referred to as priest brothers or chaplain brothers.

The Templars also employed lightly armed mercenaries as cavalry in the 12th century that were known as turcopoles (a Greek term for descendants of Turks). Its meaning has been interpreted as either referring to people of a mixed Muslim-Christian heritage who became Christians, or members of the local population in Syria. Sometime in the 13th century, turcopole became a formal rank held by Templar brothers, including Latin Christians.

==== Grand masters ====
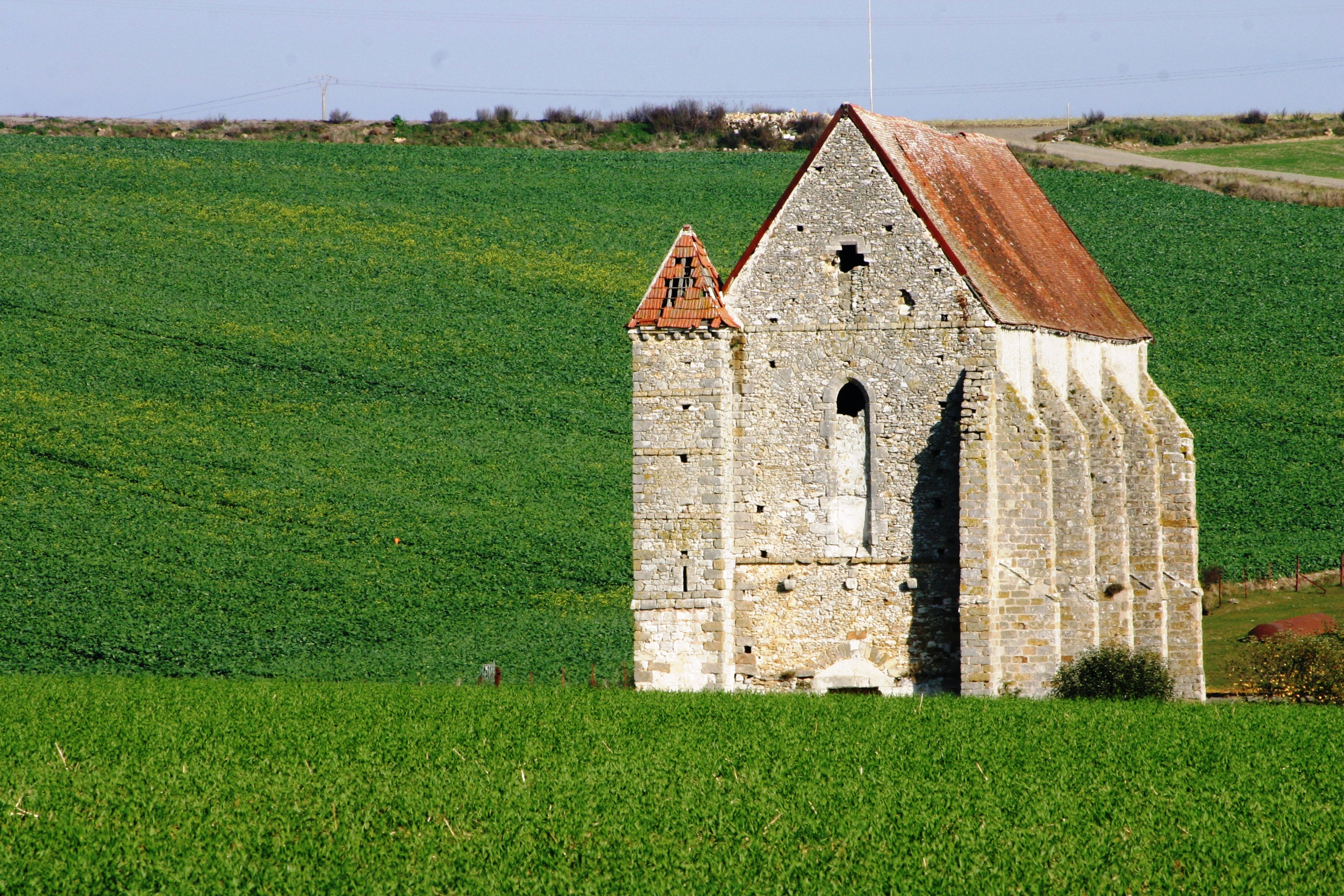
Templar building at Saint Martin des Champs, France

Starting with founder Hugues de Payens, the order's highest office was that of grand master, a position which was held for life, though considering the martial nature of the order, this could mean a very short tenure. All but two of the grand masters died in office, and several died during military campaigns. For example, during the Siege of Ascalon in 1153, Grand Master Bernard de Tremelay led a group of 40 Templars through a breach in the city walls. When the rest of the Crusader army did not follow, the Templars, including their grand master, were surrounded and beheaded. Grand master Gérard de Ridefort was beheaded by Saladin in 1189 at the Siege of Acre.

The grand master oversaw all of the operations of the order, including both the military operations in the Holy Land and Eastern Europe and the Templars' financial and business dealings in Western Europe. Some grand masters also served as battlefield commanders, though this was not always wise: several blunders in de Ridefort's combat leadership contributed to the devastating defeat at the Battle of Hattin. The last grand master was Jacques de Molay, burned at the stake in Paris in 1314 by order of King Philip IV.

=== Conduct, uniform and beards ===
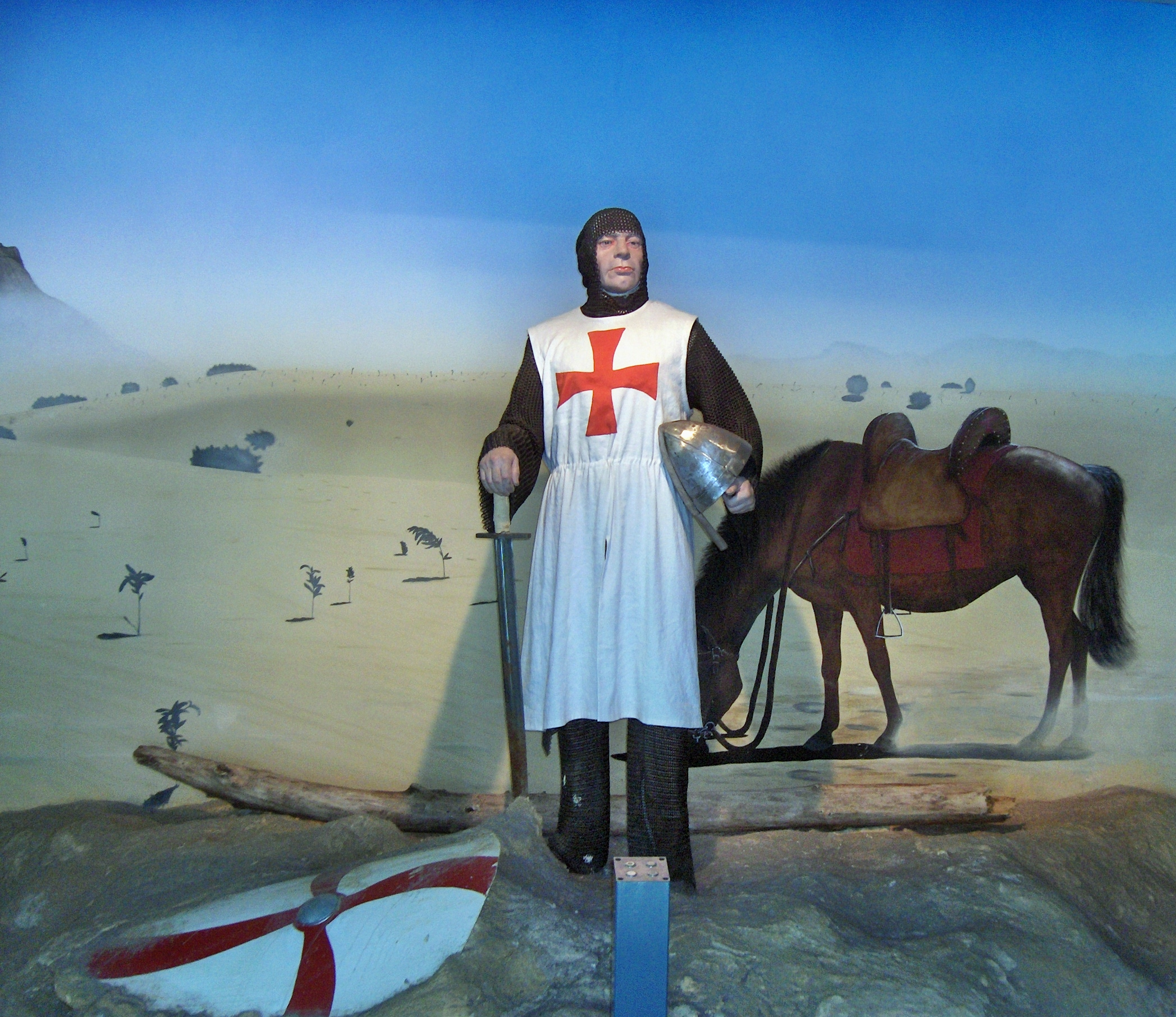
Representation of a Knight Templar (Ten Duinen Abbey museum, 2010 photograph)

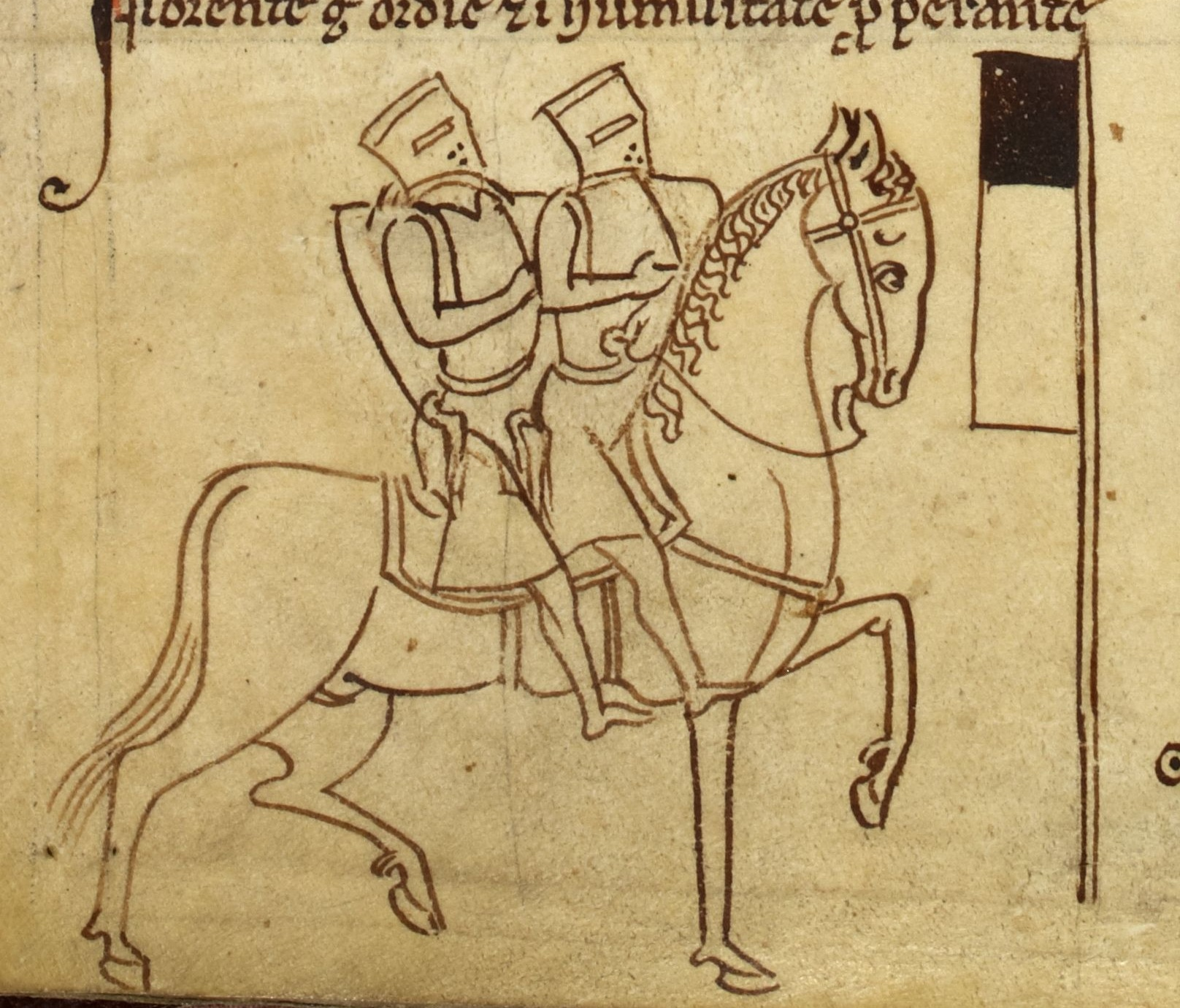
Depiction of two Templars seated on a horse (emphasising poverty), with Beauséant, the "sacred banner" (or gonfanon) of the Templars, argent a chief sable (Matthew Paris, c. 1250)

Bernard de Clairvaux and founder Hugues de Payens devised a specific code of conduct for the Templar Order, known to modern historians as the Latin Rule. Its 72 clauses laid down the details of the knights' way of life, including the types of garments they were to wear and how many horses they could have. Knights were to take their meals in silence, eat meat no more than three times per week, and not have physical contact of any kind with women, even members of their own families. A master of the Order was assigned "four horses, and one chaplain-brother, and one clerk with three horses, and one sergeant brother with two horses, and one gentleman valet to carry his shield and lance, with one horse". As the order grew, more guidelines were added, and the original list of 72 clauses was expanded to several hundred in its final form.

The daily schedule of the order adhered to the canonical hours in the Rule of Saint Benedict, with communal prayers designated at specific hours throughout the day. Members unable to participate must recite the Lord's Prayer at the same hours.

The knights wore a white surcoat with a red cross, and a white mantle also with a red cross; the sergeants wore a black tunic with a red cross on the front and a black or brown mantle. The white mantle was assigned to the Templars at the Council of Troyes in 1129, and the cross was most probably added to their robes at the launch of the Second Crusade in 1147, when Pope Eugenius III, King Louis VII of France, and many other notables attended a meeting of the French Templars at their headquarters near Paris. Under the Rule, the knights were to wear the white mantle at all times: They were even forbidden to eat or drink unless wearing it.

The red cross that the Templars wore on their robes was a symbol of martyrdom, and to die in combat was considered a great honour that assured a place in heaven. There was a cardinal rule that the warriors of the order should never surrender unless the Templar flag had fallen, and even then they were first to try to regroup with another of the Christian orders, such as that of the Hospitallers. Only after all the flags had fallen were they allowed to leave the battlefield. This uncompromising principle, along with their reputation for courage, excellent training, and heavy armament, made the Templars one of the most feared combat forces in medieval times.

Although not prescribed by the Templar Rule, it later became customary for members of the order to wear long and prominent beards. In about 1240, Alberic of Trois-Fontaines described the Templars as an "order of bearded brethren"; while during the interrogations by the papal commissioners in Paris in 1310–1311, out of nearly 230 knights and brothers questioned, 76 are described as wearing a beard, in some cases specified as being "in the style of the Templars", and 133 are said to have shaved off their beards, either in renunciation of the order or because they had hoped to escape detection.

Initiation, known as "reception" (receptio) into the order, was a profound commitment and involved a solemn ceremony. Outsiders were discouraged from attending the ceremony, which aroused the suspicions of medieval inquisitors during the later trials. New members had to willingly sign over all of their wealth and goods to the order and vow to "God and Our Lady" (mother of Jesus) poverty, chastity, piety, obedience to the master of the order, and to conquer the Holy Land of Jerusalem. They were then promised "the bread and water and poor clothing of the house and much pain and suffering".

Most brothers joined for life, although some were allowed to join for a set period. Sometimes a married man was allowed to join if he had his wife's permission, but a married brother was not allowed to wear the white mantle.

== Legacy ==
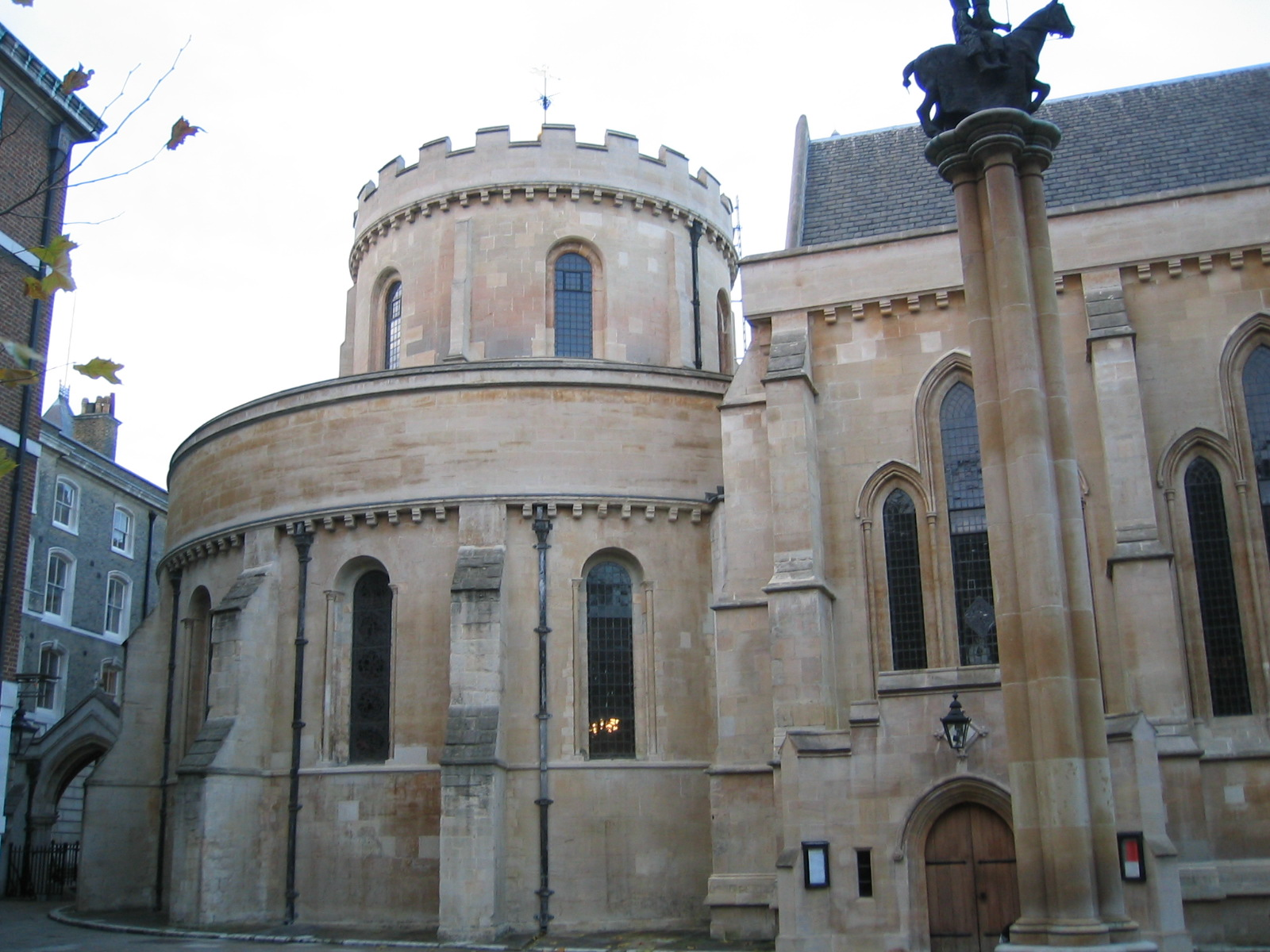
Temple Church, London. As the chapel of the New Temple in London, it was the location for Templar initiation ceremonies. In modern times it is the parish church of the Middle and Inner Temples, two of the Inns of Court, and a popular tourist attraction.

With their military mission and extensive financial resources, the Knights Templar funded a large number of building projects around Europe and the Holy Land. Many of these structures are still standing. Many sites also maintain the name "Temple" because of centuries-old associations with the Templars. For example, some of the Templars' lands in London were later rented to lawyers, which led to the names of the Temple Bar gateway and the Temple Underground station. Two of the four Inns of Court which may call members to act as barristers are the Inner Temple and Middle Temple – the entire area known as Temple, London.

Distinctive architectural elements of Templar buildings include the use of the image of "two knights on a single horse", representing the Knights' poverty, and round buildings designed to resemble the Church of the Holy Sepulchre in Jerusalem.

=== Modern organizations ===
The Knights Templar were disbanded in 1309. Following the suppression of the Order, a number of Knights Templar joined the newly established Order of Christ, which effectively reabsorbed the Knights Templar and its properties in AD 1319, especially in Portugal.

The story of the persecution and sudden dissolution of the Templars has drawn many other groups to use alleged connections with them as a way of enhancing their own image and mystery. Apart from the Order of Christ and Order of Montesa in Spain, there are no historical connections between the Knights Templar and any other modern organization, the earliest of which emerged publicly in the 18th century.

==== Order of Christ ====
Following the dissolution of the Knights Templar, the Order of Christ was erected in 1319 and absorbed many of the Knights Templar into its ranks, along with Knights Templar properties in Portugal. Its headquarters became a castle in Tomar, a former Knights Templar castle.

The Military Order of Christ consider themselves the successors of the former Knights Templar. After the Templars were abolished on 22 March 1312, the Order of Christ was founded in 1319 under the protection of the Portuguese king Denis, who refused to persecute the former knights. Denis revived the Templars of Tomar as the Order of Christ, grateful for their aid during the Reconquista and in the reconstruction of Portugal after the wars. Denis negotiated with Clement's successor John XXII for recognition of the new order and its right to inherit Templar assets and property. This was granted in the papal bull Ad ea ex quibus of 14 March 1319. The Portuguese brought the Order of Christ with them to Kongo and Brazil, where the Order of Christ continues to be awarded; the Vatican additionally has awarded the Supreme Order of Christ.

==== Associations of the faithful ====
In the Catholic Church, there are certain associations of the Christian faithful that have modeled themselves after the Knights Templar, such as the Militia Templi. Founded by Count Marcello Alberto Cristofani della Magione in 1979, the headquarters of the Militia Templi is located in the Castello della Magione, which originally belonged to the Knights Templar. Those belonging to the Militia Templi include professed religious knights and dames, as well as married couples, all of whom recite the Divine Office daily.

==== Temperance movement ====
Many temperance organizations named themselves after the Poor Fellow-Soldiers of Christ and of the Temple of Solomon, citing the belief that the original Knights Templar "drank sour milk, and also because they were fighting 'a great crusade' against 'this terrible vice' of alcohol". The largest of these, the International Order of Good Templars (IOGT), grew throughout the world after being started in the 19th century and continues to advocate for the abstinence from alcohol and other drugs; other Orders in this tradition include those of the Templars of Honor and Temperance (Tempel Riddare Orden), which has a large presence in Scandinavia.

==== Freemasonry ====
Freemasonry has incorporated the symbols and rituals of several medieval military orders in a number of Masonic bodies since at least the 18th century. This can be seen in the "Red Cross of Constantine", inspired by the Military Constantinian Order; the "Order of Malta", inspired by the Knights Hospitaller; and the "Order of the Temple", inspired by the Knights Templar. The Orders of Malta and the Temple feature prominently in the York Rite. Though some have claimed a link between the historical Knights Templar of the 14th century through members who allegedly took refuge in Scotland and aided Robert the Bruce, this theory has been rejected by both Freemasons and historians.

==== Neo-Templarism ====
Neo-Templarism is a term used to describe movements that claim to be direct continuations of the original Templars. The Templar degree system in Freemasonry built upon an idea that Templars had embedded themselves within Freemasonry; however, some Freemasons believed the Templar degrees were not subordinate to masonry and were their own system. This culminated in 1805, when Bernard-Raymond Fabré-Palaprat, a physician who refused to acknowledge the authority of the Catholic Church, created a revivalist Templar movement, claiming he had discovered a document that revealed an unbroken history of Templar grand masters to the present day. Fabré-Palaprat declared himself the grand master of his revivalist order. This began a long series of revival orders involving various schisms, of which Fabré-Palaprat is usually regarded as the originator; Fabré-Palaprat's organization eventually evolved into the Sovereign Military Order of the Temple of Jerusalem. The idea that these orders have legitimate descent from the Templars has been criticized by scholars of Templar history as dubious and tied to false claims.

=== Modern popular culture ===
The Knights Templar have been associated with legends that circulated even during their time. Many orders, such as the freemasons, claimed to have received esoteric wisdom from the Templars, or were direct descendants of the order. Masonic writers added their own speculations in the 18th century, and further fictional embellishments have been added in popular novels such as Ivanhoe, Foucault's Pendulum, and The Da Vinci Code; modern movies such as National Treasure, The Last Templar, Indiana Jones and the Last Crusade; the television series Knightfall; as well as video games such as Broken Sword, Deus Ex, Assassin's Creed and Dante's Inferno.

The Templars were the subject of many conspiracy theories and legends. A legend is that when Louis XVI was executed, a freemason dipped a cloth in the king's blood and said, "Jacques de Molay, you are avenged.", the idea being that the king of France was responsible for destroying the Knights Templar back then. A theory states that they are still existent and running a secret conspiracy to preserve the bloodline of Jesus.

There have been speculative popular publications surrounding the order's early occupation of the Temple Mount in Jerusalem as well as speculation about what relics the Templars may have found there. The association of the Holy Grail with the Templars has precedents even in 12th-century fiction; Wolfram von Eschenbach's Parzival calls the knights guarding the Grail Kingdom templeisen, apparently a conscious fictionalization of the templarii.

== See also ==
- Sovereign Military Order of Malta – Descended from the Knights Hospitaller, another Catholic religious order involved in the Crusades
- Teutonic Order – Another Catholic religious order involved in the Crusades
- Templari Cattolici d'Italia – A private Catholic lay association of the faithful living and promoting the spirituality of the Knights Templar of old
