= Battle of Fariskur (1219) =

Battle in the Fifth Crusade

- Part of the Fifth Crusade
Date	29 August 1219
Location	Fariskur, Egypt 31°19′47″N 31°42′53″E
Result	Ayyubid victory

Belligerents
Crusaders	Ayyubid Sultanate

Commanders and leaders
John of Brienne; Pelagius of Albano	al-Kāmil

Strength
~10,000	?

Casualties and losses
80–400 knights 1,000–4,000 infantry	?

The battle of Fāriskūr was a pitched battle fought between the army of the Fifth Crusade and Ayyubid Egypt on 29 August 1219 outside the Ayyubid encampment at Fāriskūr. It was fought while the siege of Damietta was ongoing. An Ayyubid victory, it had little effect on the course of the war.

== Decision ==
In February 1219, the Ayyubid sultan, al-Kāmil, retreated from the vicinity of Damietta to Fāriskūr. The crusaders contravallated the city and circumvallated their encampment. There was continuous fighting between them and al-Kāmil's forces. In May 1219, at the suggestion of Cardinal Pelagius of Albano, the crusaders marched on Fāriskūr but the sultan refused to give battle.

After the failure of an attempted assault on the walls of Damietta on 24 August, frustration in the crusader ranks reached a tipping point. The infantry and the commoners became sharply critical of the leadership and formed a council, which also included clergy and knights. According to James of Vitry, a new offensive against al-Kāmil was the only way to "calm the murmuring of the people and some of the clergy." The goal was to simultaneously march overland and sail up the Nile to attack al-Kāmil's camp and his ships near Fāriskūr, forcing him to retreat further and freeing up the besiegers to concentrate wholly on the city.

== Preparations ==
The size of the army that marched to Fāriskūr is not reported in any of the numerous sources. It seems to have been at least 10,000 strong. It marched lightly, without wagons or mules and with few supplies. It was to depend on the ships for supplies. The ships were to attach any Egyptian ships they encountered. According to the Fragmentum de captione Damiatae, the crusader camp was left in the hands of 4,000 infantry and 400 cavalry under Ralph of Saint-Omer. According to Oliver of Paderborn, few crusaders wished to remain behind in the camp.

Francis of Assisi and his companion, Illuminatus of Arce, had arrived in the crusader camp shortly before the decision to attack Fāriskūr. According to Thomas of Celano's biography of Francis, the future saint had a premonition that the crusaders were marching to defeat. Illuminatus convinced him to speak up and he preached a sermon warning the crusaders. He was not taken seriously, but later writers noted the irony that the crusaders marched out on the feast of the beheading of John the Baptist.

== March ==
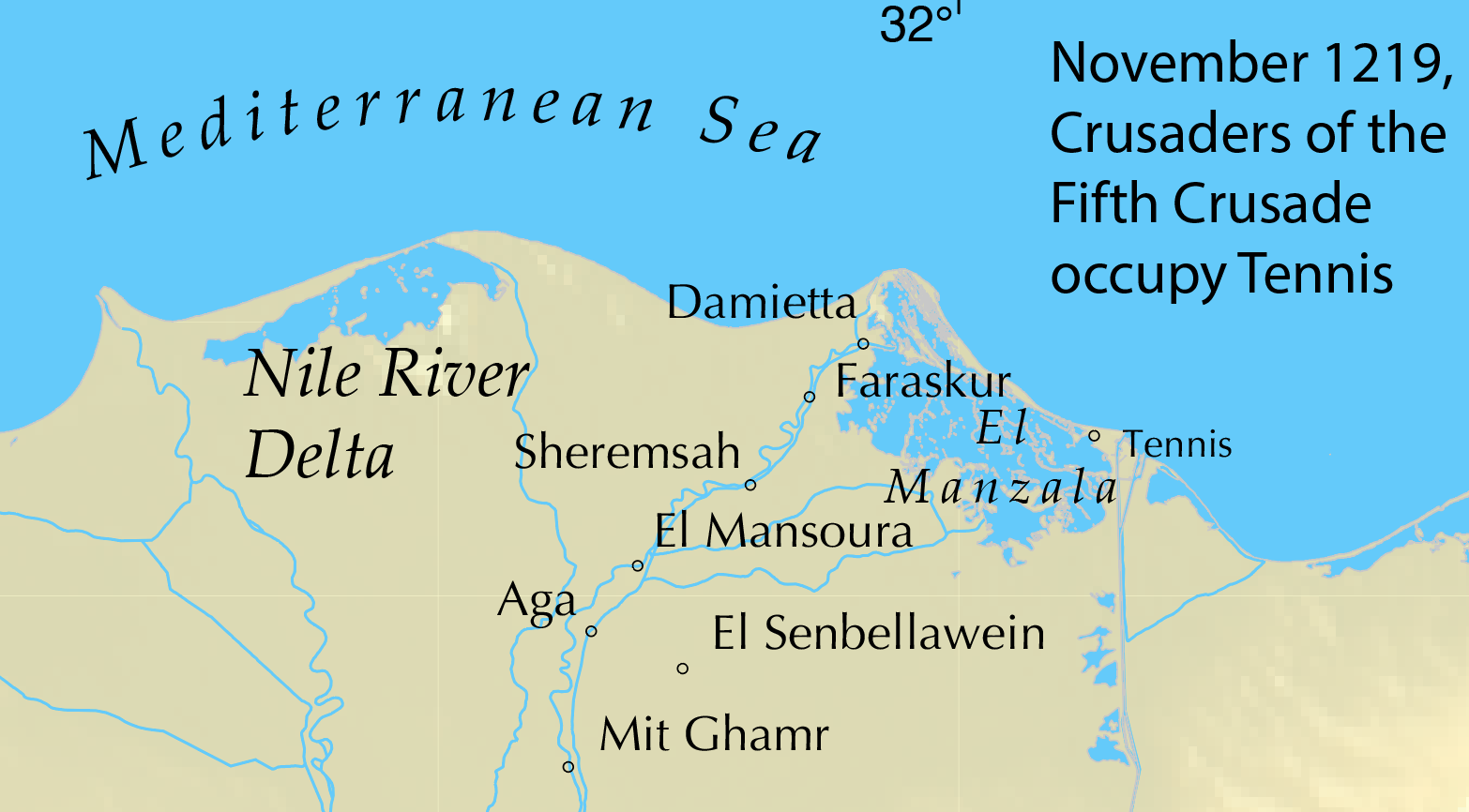
Fariskur is about 10 miles (16 km) from Damietta upriver

On 29 August, the main detachment set out for Fāriskūr under the theoretical command of John of Brienne, the king of Jerusalem. Cardinal Pelagius, Patriarch Ralph of Jerusalem and James of Vitry were also present. The vanguard, which included the Templar contingent, was commanded by Henry de Bohun. The army was divided into "battles", each led, according to the Estoire d'Eracles, by an experienced commander.

The naval forces were held back by insufficient winds. This crippled the army in the heat of the day, since the crusaders did not carry sufficient water for the march. A canal connected Fāriskūr to the Nile, but its water was brackish. The crusaders crossed it without resistance. As the crusaders turned inland towards the enemy camp, they saw some Egyptians abandoning their camp, which Oliver of Paderborn took to be a ruse. The leaders held a council to decide if the offensive should be continued or if the army should return to the siege. Although John of Brienne advocated setting up camp for the night, the decision was made to retreat.

While the leaders were holding council, discipline in the ranks began to break down. Some began looting the abandoned Egyptian camp, while others began to stray in search of water. The enthusiasm of the common soldiers, who had mocked Francis of Assisi only hours before, had evaporated.

== Battle ==
The battle of Fāriskūr was the first pitched battle of the Fifth Crusade not fought beneath fortifications. After the army had turned inland, some horsemen, perhaps Bedouin, attacked the women in the rear by the Nile, who were collect water for the troops. John of Brienne drove them off, but his actions were misinterpreted as a retreat by a contingent of infantry from Rome, who broke and fled. When the Egyptians realized that the discipline and cohesion of the crusader army was breaking down, they sent a detachment of horse archers to attack the right flank. They defeated a force of 100 knights from the kingdom of Cyprus.

A second Egyptian attack hit the centre with arrows, javelins and grenades of Greek fire. The Italian infantry quickly collapsed. Even some Hospitallers joined their chaotic flight. The Italians were to come in for heavy criticism in most written accounts of the battle. According to Oliver, Pelagius and Patriarch Ralph "begged" the men to keep in formation to no avail. The battle quickly became a rout.

Part of the crusader army remained in formation, maintaining a front against the Egyptians. This included the Pisans, Templars, the Teutonic Knights and those Hospitallers who had not fled, as well as the contingents commanded by John of Brienne, Ranulf de Blondeville, Walter Berthout, Simon III of Saarbrücken, William I of Holland and George of Wied.

During the unorganized retreat, many groups of crusaders were separated from the main army, surrounded and killed or captured. Since their camp was protected by a ditch, it had to be crossed by means of drawbridges. Some soldiers in their haste tried to climb through it. Some were killed in the press and others drowned. During the organized retreat, the Templars held the rear. John of Brienne was almost killed by Greek fire. Nonetheless, at one point he even launched an attack on the Egyptian line. According to several sources, the Templars remained outside the crusader camp until the last stragglers made it back.

== Casualties ==
The sources do not agree on casualty figures. In a letter, James of Vitry claims that more than 200 knights and 2,000 infantry were killed. The Estoire d'Eracles has double those numbers: 400 knights and 4,000 commoners. The History of the Patriarchs of Alexandria agrees with the Eracles that 400 knights were lost, but puts the total killed at 2,000. The lowest numbers provided by any source are 80 knights and 1,000 commoners killed. On the whole, these totals suggest that a few hundred knights and a few thousand foot soldiers were killed in action.

For the military orders, it is known that 33–50 Templars, 30 Teutonic Knights and 13–32 Hospitallers were killed or captured. The unnamed marshal of the Hospitallers was among the dead. A certain Sigmus de Monte was one of the few named fatalities. The list of known captives taken in battle is longer:

- Milo of Nanteuil and his brother Andrew
- Walter II of Villebéon and his son Adam
- John II of Arcis
- Henry of Ulmen
- Ralph VIII of Beaumont-au-Maine
- Philip II of Plancy
- André de Montbard, lord of Époisses
- Anselm, provost of Saint-Omer
- Milo, lord of Saint-Florentin
- Odo, lord of Châtillon-en-Bazois

Although the crusader fleet had no impact on the battle, one ship sank with the loss of 200 men.

== Aftermath ==
Although the battle of Fāriskūr was a tactical defeat for the crusaders, it was strategically insignificant. The siege of Damietta was uninterrupted. The sultan, sending a Christian captive as an emissary, asked for a truce. Within three days of the battle, a truce had been agreed, although its terms are unrecorded. The blockade of Damietta continued. It was during this truce that, with Pelagius's permission, Francis of Assisi and Illuminatus crossed the lines and visited al-Kāmil in his camp. Pelagius and John of Brienne also conducted negotiations with al-Kāmil during this period. Dissatisfaction among the ranks remained high, since it was the troops thought that al-Kāmil was merely buying time. The sultan at one point offered to hand over Jerusalem if the crusaders would abandon Egypt, but they refused, the defences of Jerusalem having just been razed by al-Kāmil's brother, al-Muʿaẓẓam, perhaps in preparation for the offer. The truce was broken by al-Kāmil on 25 September, but Damietta surrendered on 5 November.

The behaviour of the Teutonic Knights at the battle of Fariskur greatly impressed contemporaries. A series of donations to the order were made in response to the battle. Walter Berthout's brother Giles made a donation in September 1219, noting also how the Teutonic Knights cared for the poorer crusaders.

== Bibliography ==
- Donovan, Joseph P. (1950). Pelagius and the Fifth Crusade. University of Pennsylvania Press. ISBN 978-0404154165.
- Marvin, Laurence W. (2021). "The Battle of Fariskur (29 August 1219) and the Fifth Crusade: Causes, Course, and Consequences". Journal of Military History. 85 (3): 597–618.
- Perry, Guy (2013). John of Brienne: King of Jerusalem, Emperor of Constantinople, c. 1175–1237. Cambridge University Press.
- Polejowski, Karol (2017). "The Teutonic Order During the Fifth Crusade and Their Rise in Western Europe: The French Case Study (1218–58)". In E. J. Mylod; Guy Perry; Thomas W. Smith; Jan Vandeburie (eds.). The Fifth Crusade in Context: The Crusading Movement in the Early Thirteenth Century. Routledge. pp. 195–204.
- Powell, James M. (2010). Anatomy of a Crusade, 1213–1221. University of Pennsylvania Press.
- Tolan, John (2009). Saint Francis and the Sultan: The Curious history of a Christian–Muslim Encounter. Oxford University Press.
- Van Cleve, Thomas C. (1985). "The Fifth Crusade" (PDF). In Setton, Kenneth M.; Zacour, Norman P.; Hazard, Harry W. (eds.). A History of the Crusades, Volume V: The Impact of the Crusades on the Near East. Vol. 5. Madison and London: University of Wisconsin Press. pp. 377–428. ISBN 0-299-09140-6.
