= San Bevignate =

Religious building in Italy

Coordinates: 43.1106°N 12.4093°E

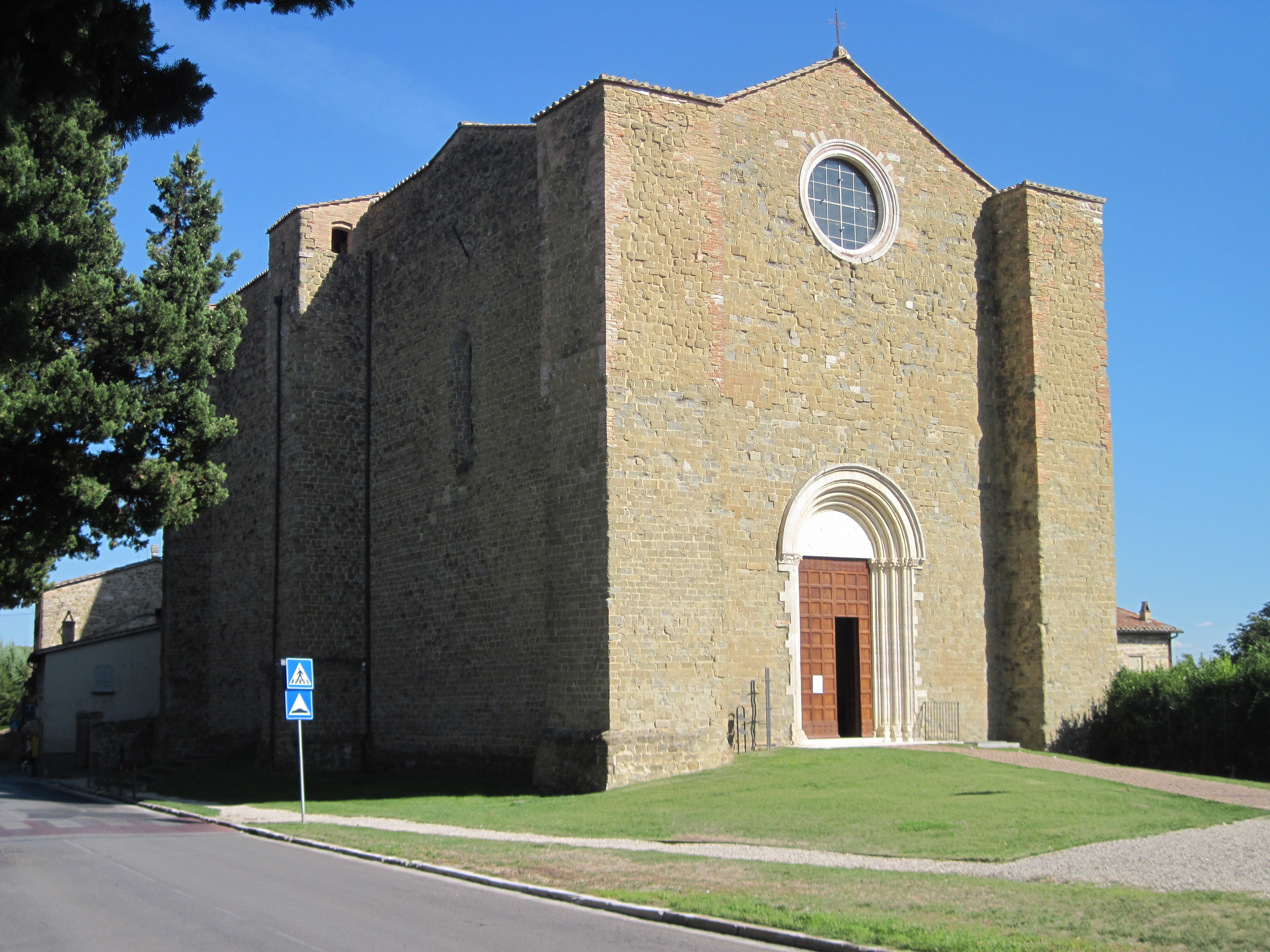
The church of San Bevignate in Perugia.

San Bevignate is a church in Perugia, Umbria, central Italy. It dates to the mid 13th century, and was expanded by the Knights Templar in the 1280s. It is notable for its 13th-century frescoes. It is named for San Bevignate, the local patron saint of the flagellant movement.

== Church ==
The church was built between 1256-1262 and measures 39.5 meters by 17 meters and stands 27 meters tall. Located on the south side were a large elaboration of monastic buildings which would have been surrounded by a wall. San Bevignate follows typical Templar architecture, being a large rectangular structure, wide open spaces internally, and a square apsidal chapel attached to the east side.

The sober interior of the church has great similarities with the chapels built by the Templars in the Holy Land. It has a single nave with groin-vaulted ceiling. The square apse, contain typical Templar architectural motifs such as the cosmological three crosses encompassed by nine stars, is introduced by a large triumphal arch.

== Frescoes ==
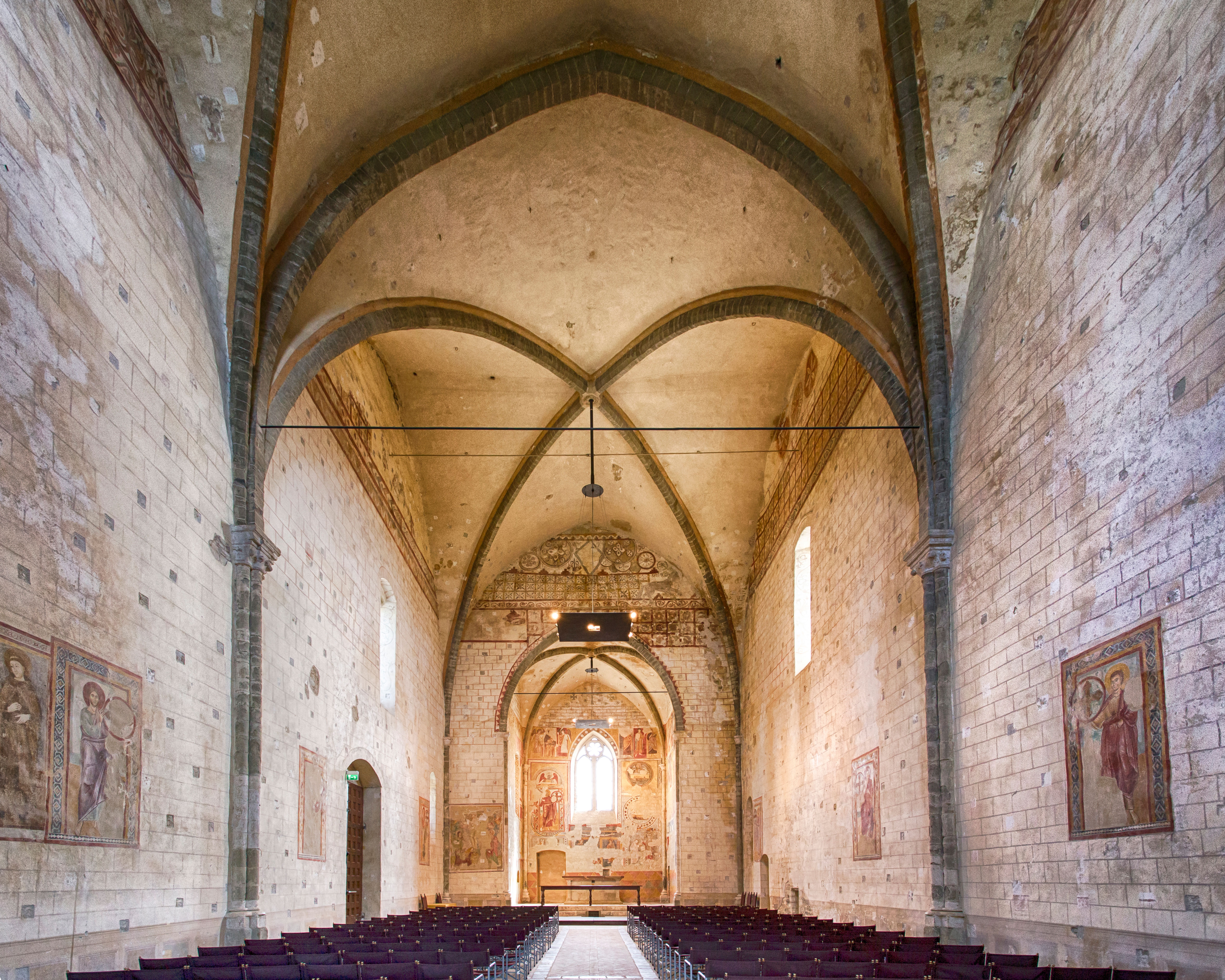
Interior of the church

The oldest frescoes are dated to the 1260s. At the top of the wall is a large cross with two smaller crosses surrounded by nine stars. The nine stars are thought to represent the founders of the Templar order. Frescoes on either side of the bifore window include the Madonna and Child enthroned with angels, three Apostles (including Barnabas, who was counted as 13th apostle by the Templars) and the symbols of the evangelists, a scene of the Crucifixion with the Virgin and St. John the Evangelist, and scenes of the life of St. Bevignate. Frescoes on the left wall depict the last Supper. Frescoes on the right wall of the apse depict the Last Judgement, above a procession of flagellants. These frescoes are interrupted by later ones showing St Bevignate and a kneeling donor.

Frescoes on the arch of the apse are mostly non-figurative; two narrative scenes are too damaged for interpretation.

The counter-facade, opposite the altar wall, are somewhat younger, dated to the end of the 13th century. They depict scenes associated with the Templars, including a boat carrying pilgrims to the Holy Land, and the scene of a battle between Templars and Saracens, thought to represent the Sack of Nablus (1242). Above the battle scene is a large lion climbing a palm tree and holding out a paw to a group of three monks.

Along the walls of the nave are a series of figures holding the Templar cross, including St Peter, and St Paul. Additional frescoes on the left wall depict St Barbara, and a male and a female mendicant saint.

== History ==
From 1260 the flagellant movement, which regarded Bevignate as their patron saint, would use San Bevignate as their parish church. Along the south wall is a fresco of flagellants, one of whom is believed to depict Raniero Fasani (d. 1281), their leader. St. Bevignate was a local hermit, whose historical existence has not been established with certainty. His veneration in the region of Perugia can be established for the mid 13th century. His cult is closely related to the penitential processions, which he is claimed to have introduced to Perugia in the Lezenda by Raniero Fasani.

The church was expanded, with monastic buildings, by the Templars as a substitute for their former church of San Giustino d'Arna, from which they had been ousted around 1283, after a dispute with the Benedictines.

In 1312, after the suppression of the Templar Order, it was acquired by the Hospitalliers. In 1324 Ricco di Corbolo, a rich Perugine merchant, acquired the whole complex and established a nunnery. During the latter part of the 14th century the nunnery, which had encountered scandals and a drop in members, was dissolved by Pope Julius II and given back to the Hospitallers.

St. Bevignate was never canonized by the Holy See, but his local cult peaked with a so-called "secular canonization", performed by local political authorities reacting to urgent popular demand, in 1453. His feast day is on 14 May.

The church was secularized in 1860.

== Sources ==
- Barber, Malcolm (1994). The New Knighthood: A History of the Order of the Temple. Cambridge University Press.
- Luttrell, Anthony; Nicholson, Helen J., eds. (2006). Hospitaller Women in the Middle Ages. Ashgate.

== See also ==
- List of places associated with the Knights Templar
