= Trapessac =

Medieval fortress in Hatay, Turkey

Coordinates: 36°31′53″N 36°21′51″E

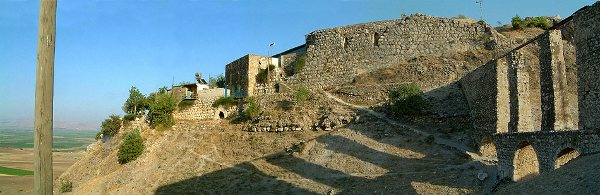
Trapessac fortress

Trapessac (Turkish: Darbı Sak Kalesi) is a medieval fortress located 4 km north of the town of Kırıkhan in Hatay Province, Turkey. Trapessac was constructed in the 12th century by the Knights Templar and, together with the nearby fortress at Bagras, guarded the Syrian Gates, the principal pass between the coastal region of Cilicia and inland Syria.

The castle fell to Saladin in 1188 after a bitterly fought, two-week siege. Lying as it did at a key point in the Amanus marches between the Principality of Antioch and the Armenian Kingdom of Cilicia, both the Templars and the Armenians were eager to retake the castle. Leo I of Armenia attempted to seize it in 1205 but was repelled by the defenders. The Templars also launched an expedition to recover it in 1237, but were ambushed and badly defeated, suffering grievous losses.

It was reoccupied by Hetoum I in 1261 after the Mongols captured it in their invasion of Syria. However, the Armenians were not to hold it long. After the defeat of the Armenian army at the Battle of Mari in 1266, Hetoum agreed to surrender the fortress to the Mamluks to ransom his son Leo. It passed into the hands of the Egyptian Mamluk sultan Baybars in 1268.

In 1280, the fortress was temporarily regained by Abaqa Khan when he advanced to sack Aleppo, only to be abandoned when he withdrew from Syria.

== See also ==
- List of Crusader castles
