= History of the Knights Templar =

Military order founded around 1118

The Poor Fellow-Soldiers of Christ and the Temple of Jerusalem, or Templars, was a military order founded in c. 1120.

== The Crusades and the Knights Templar ==
The Knights Templar were an elite fighting force of their day, highly trained, well-equipped, and highly motivated; one of the tenets of their religious order was that they were forbidden from retreating in battle, unless outnumbered three to one, and even then only by order of their commander, or if the Templar flag went down. Not all Knights Templar were warriors. The mission of most of the members was one of support – to acquire resources which could be used to fund and equip the small percentage of members who were fighting on the front lines. There were actually three classes within the orders. The highest class was the knight. When a candidate was sworn into the order, they made the knight a monk. They wore white robes. The knights could hold no property and receive no private letters. They could not be married or betrothed and could not have any vow in any other Order. They could not have debt more than they could pay, and no infirmities. The Templar priest class was similar to the modern day military chaplain. Wearing green robes, they conducted religious services, led prayers, and were assigned record keeping and letter writing. They always wore gloves, unless they were giving Holy Communion. The mounted men-at-arms represented the most common class, and they were called "brothers". They were usually assigned two horses each and held many positions, including guard, steward, squire or other support vocations. As the main support staff, they wore black or brown robes and were partially garbed in chain mail or plate mail. The armor was not as complete as the knights. Because of this infrastructure, the warriors were well-trained and very well armed. Even their horses were trained to fight in combat, fully armored. The combination of soldier and monk was also a powerful one, as to the Templar knights, martyrdom in battle was one of the most glorious ways to die.

The Templars were also shrewd tacticians, following the dream of Saint Bernard who had declared that a small force, under the right conditions, could defeat a much larger enemy. One of the key battles in which this was demonstrated was in 1177, at the Battle of Montgisard. The famous Muslim military leader Saladin was attempting to push toward Jerusalem from the south, with a force of 26,000 soldiers. He had pinned the forces of Jerusalem's King Baldwin IV, about 500 knights and their supporters, near the coast, at Ascalon. Eighty Templar knights and their own entourage attempted to reinforce. They met Saladin's troops at Gaza, but were considered too small a force to be worth fighting, so Saladin turned his back on them and headed with his army towards Jerusalem.

Once Saladin and his army had moved on, the Templars were able to join King Baldwin's forces, and together they proceeded north along the coast. Saladin had made a key mistake at that point – instead of keeping his forces together, he permitted his army to temporarily spread out and pillage various villages on their way to Jerusalem. The Templars took advantage of this low state of readiness to launch a surprise ambush directly against Saladin and his bodyguard, at Montgisard near Ramla. Saladin's army was spread too thin to adequately defend themselves, and he and his forces were forced to fight a losing battle as they retreated back to the south, ending up with only a tenth of their original number. The battle was not the final one with Saladin, but it bought a year of peace for the Kingdom of Jerusalem, and the victory became a heroic legend.

Another key tactic of the Templars was that of the "squadron charge". A small group of knights and their heavily armed warhorses would gather into a tight unit which would gallop full speed at the enemy lines, with a determination and force of will that made it clear that they would rather commit suicide than fall back. This terrifying onslaught would frequently have the desired result of breaking a hole in the enemy lines, thereby giving the other Crusader forces an advantage.

The Templars, though relatively small in number, routinely joined other armies in key battles. They would be the force that would ram through the enemy's front lines at the beginning of a battle, or the fighters that would protect the army from the rear. They fought alongside King Louis VII of France, and King Richard I of England. In addition to battles in Palestine, members of the Order also fought in the Spanish and Portuguese Reconquista, such as at the Siege of Tomar in 1190.

== Bankers ==
Though initially an Order of poor monks, the official papal sanction made the Knights Templar a charity across Europe. Further resources came in when members joined the Order, as they had to take oaths of poverty, and therefore often donated large amounts of their original cash or property to the Order. Additional revenue came from business dealings. Since the monks themselves were sworn to poverty, but had the strength of a large and trusted international infrastructure behind them, nobles would occasionally use them as a kind of bank or power of attorney. If a noble wished to join the Crusades, this might entail an absence of years from their home. So some nobles would place all of their wealth and businesses under the control of Templars, to safeguard it for them until their return. The Order's financial power became substantial, and the majority of the Order's infrastructure was devoted not to combat, but to economic pursuits.

By 1150, the Order's original mission of guarding pilgrims had changed into a mission of guarding their valuables through an innovative way of issuing letters of credit, an early precursor of modern banking. Pilgrims would visit a Templar house in their home country, depositing their deeds and valuables. The Templars would then give them a letter which would describe their holdings. Modern scholars have stated that the letters were encrypted with a cipher alphabet based on a Maltese Cross; however there is some disagreement on this, and it is possible that the code system was introduced later, and not something used by the medieval Templars themselves. While traveling, the pilgrims could present the letter to other Templars along the way, to "withdraw" funds from their accounts. This kept the pilgrims safe since they were not carrying valuables, and further increased the power of the Templars.

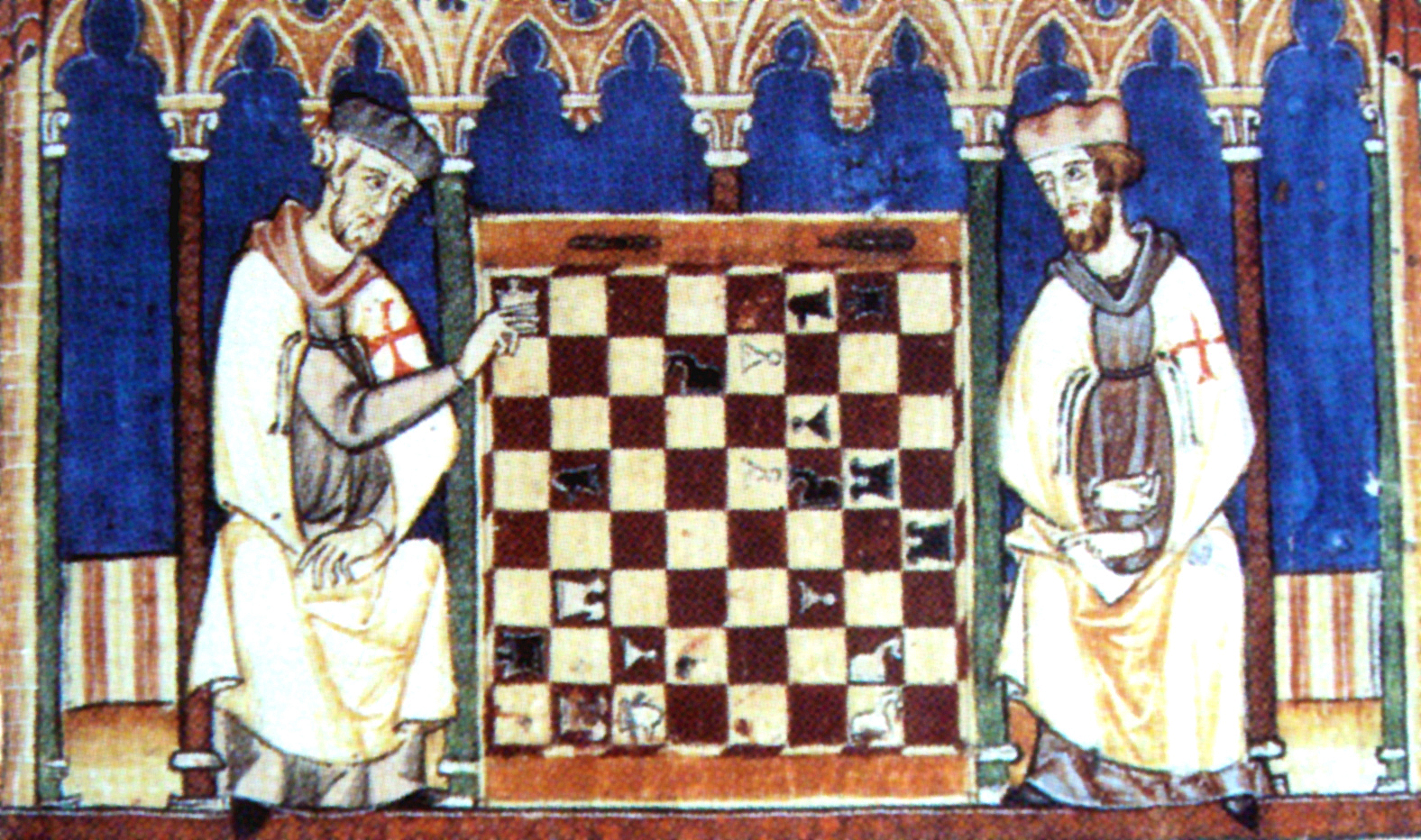
Knights Templar playing chess, 1283

The Knights' involvement in banking grew over time into a new basis for money, as Templars became increasingly involved in banking activities. One indication of their powerful political connections is that the Templars' involvement in usury did not lead to more controversy within the Order and the church at large. Officially the idea of lending money in return for interest was forbidden by the church, but the Order sidestepped this with clever loopholes, such as a stipulation that the Templars retained the rights to the production of mortgaged property. Or as one Templar researcher put it, "Since they weren't allowed to charge interest, they charged rent instead."

Their holdings were necessary to support their campaigns; in 1180, a Burgundian noble required 3 square kilometres of estate to support himself as a knight, and by 1260 this had risen to 15.6 km^{2}. The Order potentially supported up to 4,000 horses and pack animals at any given time, if provisions of the rule were followed; these horses had extremely high maintenance costs due to the heat in Outremer (Crusader states at the Eastern Mediterranean), and had high mortality rates due to both disease and the Turkish bowmen strategy of aiming at a knight's horse rather than the knight himself. In addition, the high mortality rates of the knights in the East (regularly ninety percent in battle, not including wounded) resulted in extremely high campaign costs due to the need to recruit and train more knights.

The Templars' political connections and awareness of the essentially urban and commercial nature of the Outremer communities led the Order to a position of significant power, both in Europe and the Holy Land. They owned large tracts of land both in Europe and the Middle East, built churches and castles, bought farms and vineyards, were involved in manufacturing and import/export, had their own fleet of ships, and for a time even "owned" the entire island of Cyprus.

== Decline ==
Their success attracted the concern of many other orders, with the two most powerful rivals being the Knights Hospitaller and the Teutonic Knights. Various nobles also had concerns about the Templars as well, both for financial reasons, and nervousness about an independent army that was able to move freely through all borders.

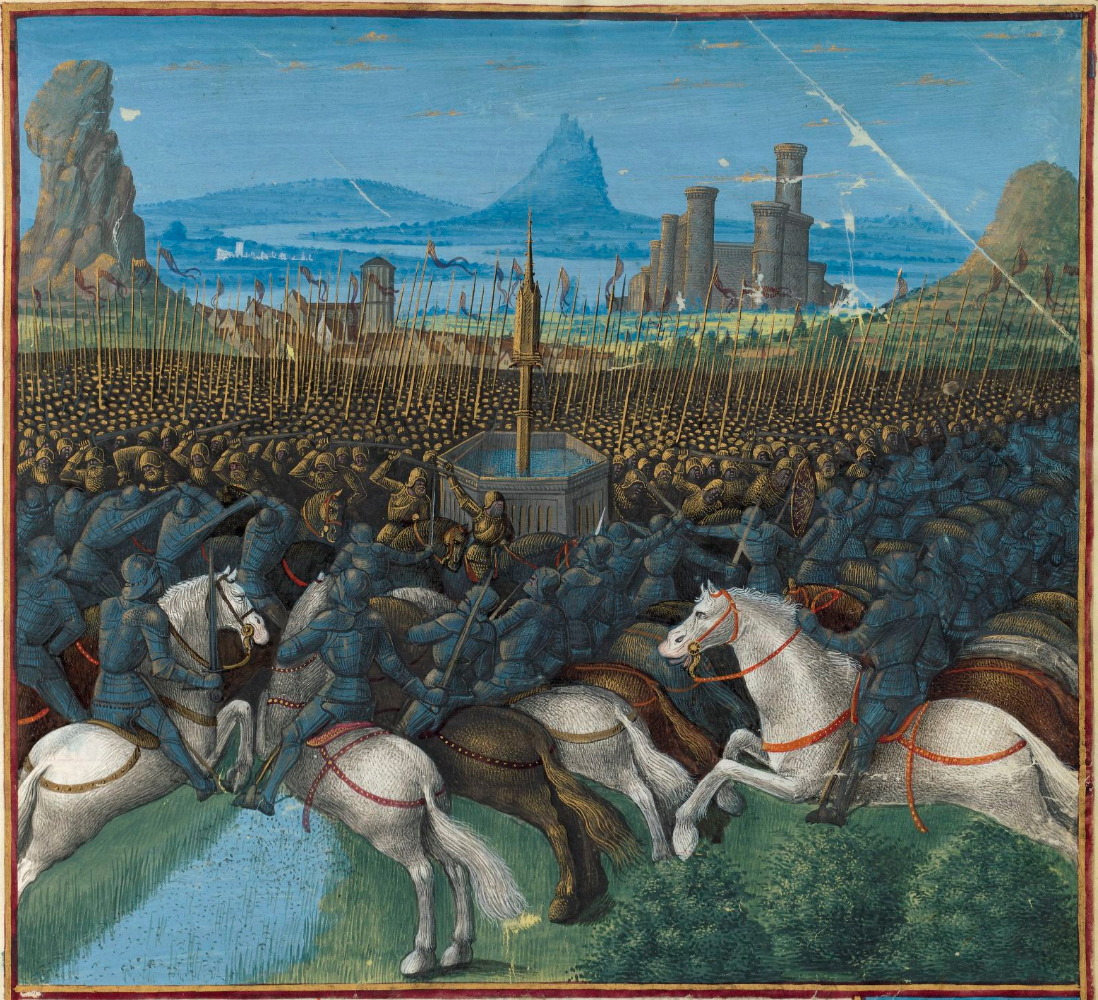
The Battle of Hattin, from a copy of the Passages d’outremer, c.1490

The long-famed military acumen of the Templars began to stumble in the 1180s. On July 4, 1187, came the disastrous Battle of the Horns of Hattin, a turning point in the Crusades. It again involved Saladin, who had been beaten back by the Templars in 1177 in the legendary Battle of Montgisard near Tiberias, but this time Saladin was better prepared. Further, the Grand Master of the Templars was involved in this battle, Gerard de Ridefort, who had just achieved that lifetime position a few years earlier. He was not known as a good military strategist, and made some deadly errors, such as venturing out with his force of 80 knights without adequate supplies or water, across the arid hill country of Galilee. The Templars were overcome by the heat within a day, and then surrounded and massacred by Saladin's army. Within months Saladin captured Jerusalem.

But in the early 1190s, in a remarkably short and powerfully effective campaign, Richard the Lionheart, King of England and leader of the Third Crusade, together with his allies the Templars, delivered a series of powerful blows against Saladin and recovered much of Christian territory. In name and number the revived Crusader states were as before, but their outlines were diminished. There was the Kingdom of Jerusalem, though its capital was at Acre, which the Templars made their new headquarters. To the north was the County of Tripoli. But the Muslims retained control of the Syrian coast around Latakia for some time, and so the Principality of Antioch further to the north was now no longer contiguous to the other Crusader states. Nevertheless, the Third Crusade, in which Richard relied heavily on the Templars, had saved the Holy Land for the Christians and went a long way towards restoring Frankish fortunes. In this he was abetted by the military orders, whose great castles stood like islands of Frankish power amid the Muslim torrent. More than ever the Crusader states were relying on the military orders in their castles and on the field of battle, and the power of the orders grew. In fact at no point in their history would the Templars be more powerful than in the century to come.

But after the Siege of Acre in 1291, the Templars were forced to relocate their headquarters to the island of Cyprus.

Jacques de Molay, who was to be the last of the Order's Grand Masters, took office around 1292. One of his first tasks was to tour across Europe, to raise support for the Order and try to organise another Crusade. He met the newly invested Pope Boniface VIII, who agreed to grant the Templars the same privileges at Cyprus as they had held in the Holy Land. Charles II of Naples and Edward I also pledged varying types of support, either continuing to exempt the Templars from taxes, or pledging future support towards building a new army.

=== Final attempts to regain the Holy Land (1298–1300) ===
In 1298 or 1299, the military orders (the Knights Templar and Knights Hospitaller) and their leaders, including Jacques de Molay, Otton de Grandson and the Great Master of the Hospitallers, briefly campaigned in Armenia, in order to fight off an invasion by the Mamluks. They were not successful and soon the fortress of Roche-Guillaume in the Belen Pass, the last Templar stronghold in Antioch, was lost to the Muslims.

In 1300, the Templars, along with the Knights Hospitaller and forces from Cyprus attempted to retake the coastal city of Tortosa. They were able to take the island of Arwad, near Tortosa, but lost it soon after. With the loss of Arwad, the Crusaders had lost their last foothold in the Holy Land.

Though they still had a base of operations in Cyprus, and controlled considerable financial resources, the Order of the Templars became an Order without a clear purpose or support, but which still had enormous financial power. This unstable situation contributed to their downfall.

== Fall ==
King Philip IV of France mistrusted the Templars. The Teutonic Knights ruled Prussia under charters issued by the Pope and the Holy Roman Emperor as a sovereign monastic state. He was concerned that the Templars in the Languedoc of southeastern France were planning the same thing. In 1306, the Templars had supported a coup on the island of Cyprus, which had forced King Henry II of Cyprus to abdicate his throne in favor of his brother, Amalric of Tyre. Philip had inherited land in the region of Champagne, France, which was the Templars' headquarters. The Templars were already a "state within a state", were institutionally wealthy, paid no taxes, and had a large standing army which by papal decree could move freely through all European borders. However, this army no longer had a presence in the Holy Land, leaving it with no battlefield. Philip had also inherited an impoverished kingdom from his father and was already deeply in debt to the Templars. However, recent studies emphasize the political and religious motivations of the French king. It seems that, with the "discovery" and repression of the "Templars' heresy," the Capetian monarchy claimed for itself the mystic foundations of the papal theocracy. The Temple case was the last step of a process of appropriating these foundations, which had begun with the Franco-papal rift at the time of Boniface VIII. Being the ultimate defender of the Catholic faith, the Capetian king was invested with a Christlike function that put him above the pope: what was at stake in the Templars' trial, then, was the establishment of a "royal theocracy".

At dawn on Friday, October 13, 1307, scores of French Templars were simultaneously arrested by agents of King Philip, later to be tortured in locations such as the tower at Chinon, into admitting heresy and other sacrilegious offenses in the Order. Then they were put to death.

On August 12, 1308, the charges would be increased and would become more outrageous, one specifically stated that the Templars worshipped idols, specifically made of a cat and a head, the latter having three faces. The lists of articles 86 to 127[3] would add many other charges. The majority of these charges were identical to the charges that had been earlier issued against the inconvenient Pope Boniface VIII: accusations of denying Christ, spitting and urinating on the cross, and devil worship. Of the 138 Templars (many of them old men) questioned in Paris over the next few years, 105 of them "confessed" to denying Christ during the secret Templar initiations. 103 confessed to an "obscene kiss" being part of the ceremonies, and 123 said they spat on the cross. Throughout the trial there was never any physical evidence of wrongdoing, and no independent witnesses; the only "proof" was obtained through confessions induced by torture. The Templars reached out to the Pope for assistance, and Pope Clement wrote letters to King Philip questioning the arrests.

Despite the fact that the confessions had been produced under duress, they caused a scandal in Paris, with mobs calling for action against the blaspheming Order. In response to this public pressure, along with more bullying from King Philip, Pope Clement issued the bull Pastoralis Praeeminentiae, which instructed all Christian monarchs in Europe to arrest all Templars and seize their assets. Most monarchs simply didn't believe the charges, though proceedings were started in British Isles, Iberia, Kingdom of Germany, Italian Peninsula, and Kingdom of Cyprus, with the likelihood of a confession being dependent on whether or not torture was used to extract it.

The dominant view is that Philip, who seized the treasury and broke up the monastic banking system, was jealous of the Templars' wealth and power, and frustrated by his enormous debt to them, sought to seize their financial resources for himself by bringing blatantly false charges against them at the Tours assembly in 1308. It is almost impossible to believe, that, under the influence of his carefully chosen advisors (the same that had persecuted Boniface), he actually believed the charges to be true. It is widely accepted that Philip had clearly made up the accusations, some nearly identical to those made against Boniface, and did not believe any of the Templars to have been party to such activities. It is a fact that he had invited Jacques de Molay to be a pall-bearer at the funeral of Catherine I, Latin Empress on the very day before the arrests.

The arrests caused some shifts in the European economy, from a system of Fiat money back to European money, removing this power from Church orders. Seeing the fate of the Templars, the Hospitallers of St John of Jerusalem and of Rhodes were also convinced to give up banking at this time.

== Dismantling ==
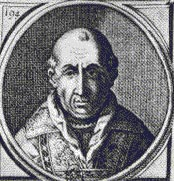
Pope Clement V

In 1312, after the Council of Vienne, and under extreme pressure from King Philip IV, Pope Clement V issued an edict officially dissolving the Order. Many kings and nobles who had been supporting the Knights up until that time, finally acquiesced and dissolved the orders in their fiefs in accordance with the Papal command. Most were not so brutal as the French. In England, many Knights were arrested and tried, but not found guilty.

Much of the Templar property outside France was transferred by the Pope to the Knights Hospitaller, and many surviving Templars were also accepted into the Hospitallers. In the Iberian Peninsula, where the king of Aragon was against giving the heritage of the Templars to the Hospitallers (as commanded by Clement V), the Order of Montesa took Templar assets.

The order continued to exist in Portugal, simply changing its name to the Order of Christ. This group was believed to have contributed to the first naval discoveries of the Portuguese. Prince Henry the Navigator led the Portuguese order for 20 years until the time of his death.

Even with the absorption of Templars into other Orders, there are still questions as to what became of all of the tens of thousands of Templars across Europe. There had been 15,000 "Templar Houses", and an entire fleet of ships. Even in France where hundreds of Templars had been rounded up and arrested, this was only a small percentage of the estimated 3,000 Templars in the entire country. Also, the extensive archive of the Templars, with detailed records of all of their business holdings and financial transactions, was never found. By papal bull it was to have been transferred to the Hospitallers.

A popular thread of conspiracy theory originating with Holy Blood, Holy Grail has it that the Templars used a fleet of 18 ships at La Rochelle to escape arrest in France. The fleet allegedly left laden with knights and treasures just before the issue of the warrant for the arrest of the Order in October 1307. This, in turn, was based on a single item of testimony from serving brother Jean de Châlon, who says he had "heard people talking that [Gerard de Villiers had] put to sea with 18 galleys, and the brother Hugues de Chalon fled with the whole treasury of the brother Hugues de Pairaud." However, aside from being the sole source for this statement, the transcript indicates that it is hearsay, and this serving brother seems to be prone to making some of the wildest and most damning of claims about the Order, which have led some to doubt his credibility.

In Holy Blood, Holy Grail, the knights that allegedly boarded these ships then escaped to Scotland, but in some versions the Templars are even claimed to have left for North America, burying a treasure in Oak Island, Nova Scotia, Canada (a story taken up in the 2004 movie National Treasure starring Nicolas Cage). However, many historians have questioned the plausibility of this scenario. For example, historian Helen Nicholson has argued that

The Templars did have ships to carry personnel, pilgrims and supplies across the Mediterranean between the West and East and back, but if the Hospital after 1312 is any guide they did not have more than four galleys (warships) and few other ships, and if they needed more they hired them. They certainly could not spare ships to indulge in world exploration ... [T]he records of the port of La Rochelle show that the Templars were exporting wine by ship. This was not a fleet in any modern sense: again, those would have been transport vessels rather than warships, and the Templars probably hired them as they needed them, rather than buying their own. ... The ships would have been very small by modern standards, too shallow in draught and sailing too low in the water to be able to withstand the heavy waves and winds of the open Atlantic, and suited for use only in the relatively shallow waters of the continental shelf. What was more, they could not carry enough water to be at sea for long periods.

== Heresy, blasphemy, and other charges ==
The charges of heresy included spitting, trampling, or urinating on the cross; while naked, being kissed obscenely by the receptor on the lips, navel, and base of the spine; heresy and worship of idols; institutionalized sodomy; and also accusations of contempt of the Holy Mass and denial of the sacraments. Barbara Frale has suggested that these acts were intended to simulate the kind of humiliation and torture that a Crusader might be subjected to if captured by the Saracens. According to this line of reasoning, they were taught how to commit apostasy with the mind only and not with the heart. Subsequently, the charges would be increased and would become, according to the procedures, lists of articles 86 to 127[3] in which will be added a few other charges, such as the prohibition to priests who do not belong to the order.

The incontrovertibility of the evidence that the Templar priests did not mutilate the words of consecration in the mass is furnished in the Cypriote proceedings by ecclesiastics who had long dwelt with them in the East.

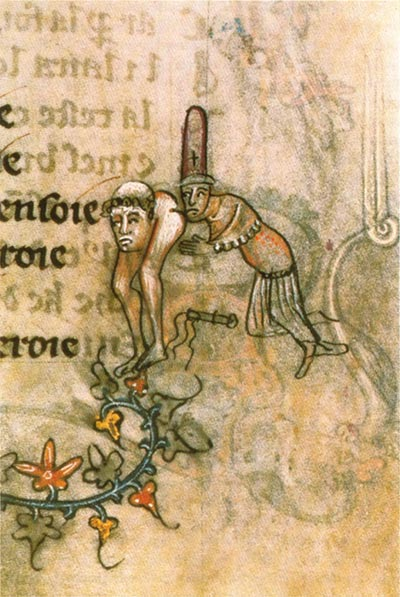
The manuscript illustration (c. 1350) alludes to the accusation of "obscene kisses" at the base of the spine

Debate continues as to whether the accusation of religious heresy had merit by the standards of the time. Under torture, some Templars admitted to sodomy and to the worship of heads and an idol known as Baphomet. Their leaders later denied these admissions, and for that were executed. Some scholars, such as Malcolm Barber, Helen Nicholson and Peter Partner, discount these as forced admissions, typical during the Medieval Inquisition.

The majority of the charges were identical to other people being tortured by the Inquisitors, with one exception: head worship. The Templars were specifically charged with worshipping some type of severed head; a charge which was made only against Templars. The descriptions of the head allegedly venerated by the Templars were varied and contradictory in nature. Quoting Norman Cohn:

Some describe it as having three faces, others as having four feet, others as being simply a face with no feet. For some it was a human skull, embalmed and encrusted with jewels; for others it was carved out of wood. Some maintained that it came from the remains of a former grand master of the order, while others were equally convinced that it was Baphomet – which in turn was interpreted as 'Mohammed'. Some saw it as having horns.

Barber has linked this charge to medieval folklore about magical heads, and the popular medieval belief that the Muslims worshipped idols. Some argue it referred to rituals involving the alleged relics of John the Baptist, Euphemia, one of Ursula's eleven maidens, and/or Hugues de Payens rather than pagan idols.

The accusation of venerating Baphomet is more problematic. Karen Ralls has noted, "There is no mention of Baphomet either in the Templar Rule or in other medieval period Templar documents". The late scholar Hugh J. Schonfield speculated that the chaplains of the Knights Templar created the term Baphomet through the Atbash cipher to encrypt the Gnostic term Sophia (Greek for "wisdom") due to the influence of hypothetical Qumran Essene scrolls, which they may have found during archaeological digs in the Kingdom of Jerusalem.

== Roman Catholic Church's position ==
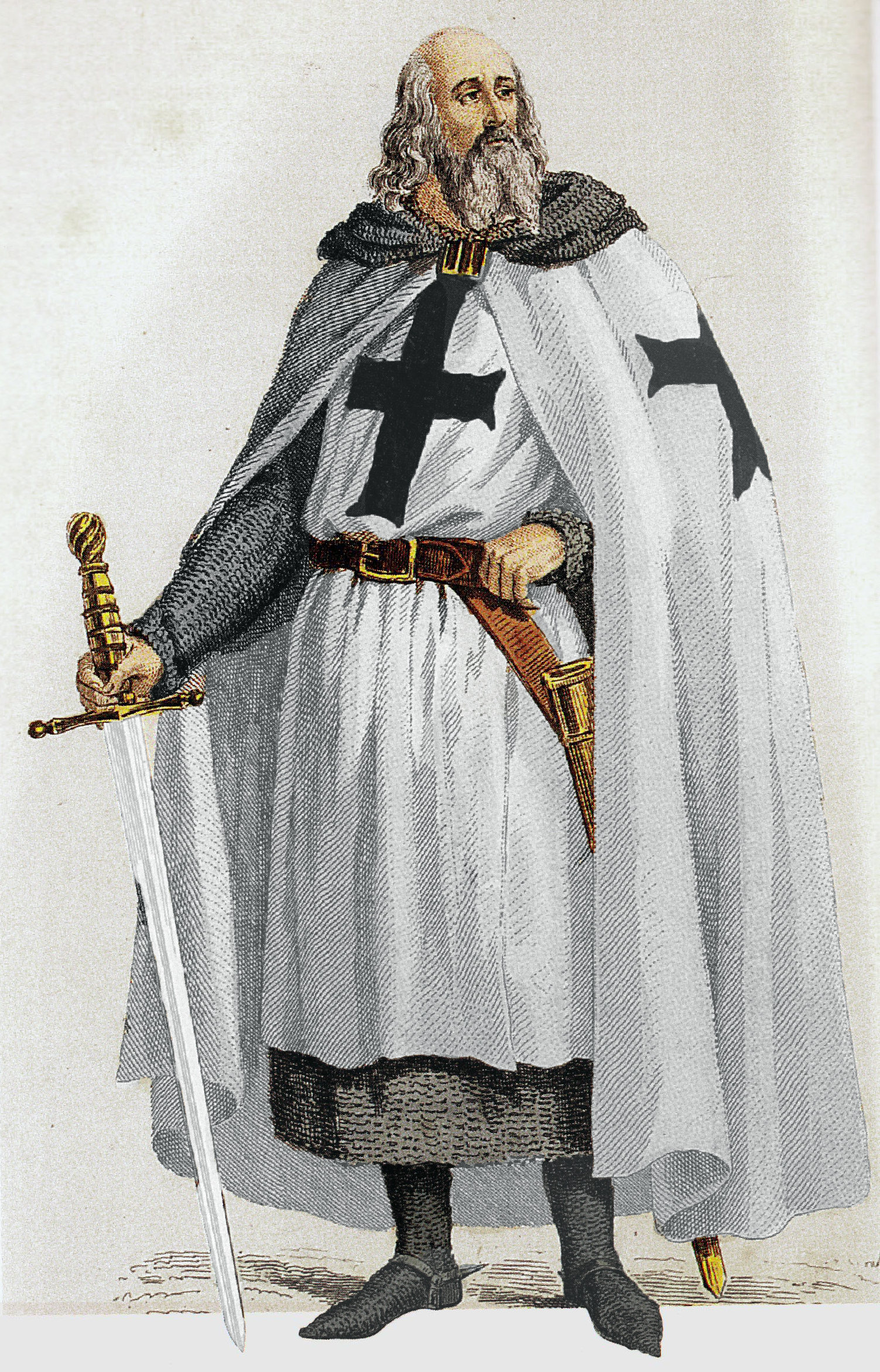
Jacques de Molay, nineteenth-century color lithograph by Chevauchet

The papal process started by Pope Clement V, to investigate both the Order as a whole and its members individually found virtually no knights guilty of heresy outside France. Fifty-four knights were executed in France by French authorities as relapsed heretics after denying their original testimonies before the papal commission; these executions were motivated by Philip's desire to prevent Templars from mounting an effective defence of the Order.

Nonetheless, many members testified against the charges of heresy in the ensuing papal investigation. Despite the poor defense of the Order, when the papal commission ended its proceedings on June 5, 1311, it found no evidence that the Order itself held heretical doctrines, or used a "secret rule" apart from the Latin and French rules.

=== Council of Vienne ===
The arrests of the Knights Templar, coupled with the previous defiance of the Colonna cardinals and Philip IV against Pope Boniface VIII, convinced Clement V to call for a general council. The Council of Vienne convened on October 16, 1311. Attendees included twenty cardinals, four patriarchs, about one hundred archbishops and bishops, plus several abbots and priors. The Templars were directed to send suitable representatives, but Grand Master Jacques de Molay was already in prison in Paris and trials of other Templars were in progress. A majority of the cardinals and nearly all the members of the council were of the opinion that the Order of Knights Templar should be granted the right to defend itself and that no proof collected up to then was sufficient to condemn the order of the heresy of which it was accused by Philip's ministry, without straining canon law. The discussion of Knights Templar was then put in abeyance.

Under pressure from King Philip, who arrived in Vienne on March 20, 1312, Clement V, on March 22, promulgated the bull Vox in excelsis in which he stated that although there was not sufficient reason to condemn the Order, for the common good, the hatred of the Order by Philip IV, the scandal brought about by their trial, he had decided to suppress the Order. But the decree explicitly stated that dissolution was enacted, "with a sad heart, not by definitive sentence, but by apostolic provision."

This was followed by the papal bull Ad providam on May 2, 1312, which granted all of the Order's lands and wealth to the Hospitallers so that its original purpose could be met, despite Philip's wishes that the lands in France pass to him. Philip held onto some lands until 1318, and in England the crown and nobility held a great deal until 1338; in many areas of Europe the land was never given over to the Hospitaller Order, instead taken over by nobility and monarchs in an attempt to lessen the influence of the Church and its Orders. Of the knights who had not admitted to the charges, against those whom nothing had been found, or those who had admitted but been reconciled to the Church, some joined the Hospitallers (even staying in the same Templar houses); others joined Augustinian or Cistercian houses; and still others returned to secular life with pension. In Portugal and Aragon, the Holy See granted the properties to two new Orders, the Order of Christ and the Order of Montesa respectively, made up largely of Templars in those kingdoms.

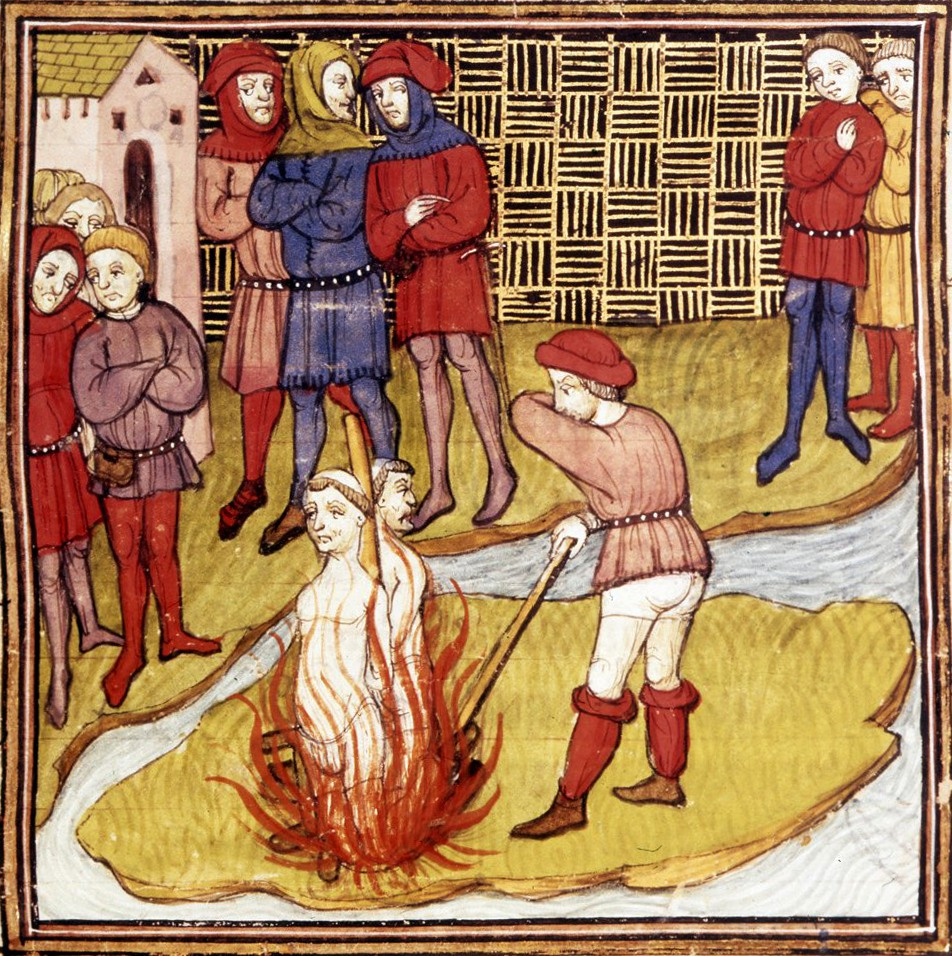
Two Templars burned at the stake, including Jacques de Molay, from a French 15th-century manuscript

In the end, the only three accused of heresy directly by the commission in Paris were Jacques de Molay, Grand Master of the Knights Templar, and his two immediate subordinates; they were to renounce their heresy publicly, when de Molay regained his courage and proclaimed the order's and his innocence along with Geoffrey de Charney. The two were arrested by French authorities as relapsed heretics and burned at the stake in 1314.

In England, the Crown was also deeply in debt to the Templars, and, probably on that basis, the Templars were also persecuted in England, their lands forfeited and taken by others (the last private owner being the favorite of Edward II, Hugh le Despenser). Many of Templars in England were killed; some fled to Scotland and other places. In France, Philip IV, who was also coincidentally in terrible financial debt to the Templars, was perhaps the more aggressive persecutor. So widely was the injustice of Philip's rage against the Templars perceived that the "Curse of the Templars" became legend. Reputedly uttered by the Grand Master Jacques de Molay upon the stake whence he burned, he adjured: "Within one year, God will summon both Clement and Philip to His Judgment for these actions." The fact that both rulers died within a year, as predicted, only heightened the scandal surrounding the suppression of the Order. The source of this legend does not date from the time of the execution of Jacques de Molay.

== Chinon and Absolution ==
In September 2001, Barbara Frale discovered a copy of the Chinon Parchment dated 17–20 August 1308 in the Vatican Secret Archives, a document that indicated that Pope Clement V absolved the leaders of the Order in 1308. Frale published her findings in the Journal of Medieval History in 2004. In 2007, The Vatican published the Chinon Parchment as part of a limited edition of 799 copies of Processus Contra Templarios. Another Chinon parchment dated 20 August 1308 addressed to Philip IV of France, well known to historians, stated that absolution had been granted to all those Templars that had confessed to heresy "and restored them to the Sacraments and to the unity of the Church".

== See also ==
- List of Knights Templar sites
- List of Knights Templar

== References and further reading ==
- Malcolm Barber, The New Knighthood: A History of the Order of the Temple. Cambridge University Press, 1994. ISBN 0521420415
- Malcolm Barber, The Trial of the Templars, Second edition. New York: Cambridge University Press, 2006 (hardback, ISBN 0521856396; paperback, ISBN 0521672368)
- Alan Butler, Stephen Dafoe, The Warriors and the Bankers: A History of the Knights Templar from 1307 to the present, Templar Books, 1998. ISBN 0968356729
- Barbara Frale, The Knights Templar – The secret history revealed, Maverick House Publishers; 2009. ISBN 978-1905379606
- Michael Haag, The Tragedy of the Templars, Profile Books, London 2012. ISBN 978-1846684500
- Michael Haag, The Templars: History and Myth, Profile Books, London 2008. ISBN 978-1846681486
- Sławomir Majoch (ed.). The Knights Templar: History & Myth, District Museum: Toruń (Poland), 2004. ISBN 8387083720
- Sean Martin, The Knights Templar: History & Myths, 2005. ISBN 1560256451
- Helen Nicholson, The Knights Templar: A New History, Sutton Publishing, 2001. ISBN 0750925175
- Peter Partner, The Knights Templar and their Myth, Destiny Books; Reissue edition, 1990. ISBN 0892812737
- Hans Prutz (trans. Dr. E. Kiernan), The Secret Teaching of the Knights Templar, Aontau 2006. ISBN 978-3936730029
- Dr. Karen Ralls, The Templars and the Grail, Quest Books, 2003. ISBN 0835608077
- Piers Paul Read, The Templars, Phoenix Press, 1990. ISBN 0753810875
- George Smart, The Knights Templar: Chronology, Authorhouse, 2005. ISBN 1418498890
- Julien Théry, "Philip the Fair, the Trial of the 'Perfidious Templars' and the Pontificalization of the French Monarchy", in Journal of Medieval Religious Culture, 39/2 (2013), pp. 117–148, online
- The History Channel, Decoding the Past: The Templar Code documentary, 2005
- Domizio Cipriani, Templar Order – the Templar path the path towards the wisdom, Publisher BastogiLibri, ISBN 978-8899376864
