= Trials of the Knights Templar =

Inquisitions and trials of the Knights Templar

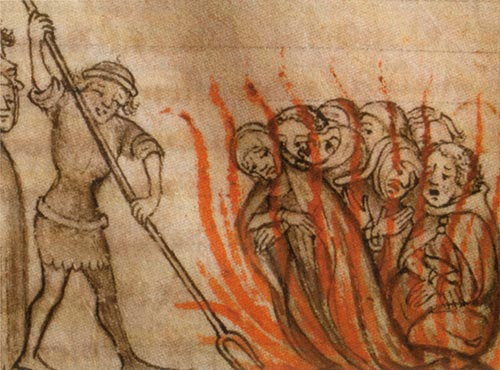
Templars being burned at the stake, illustration from an anonymous German chronicle, Von der Schöpfung der Welt bis 1384

The downfall of the Knights Templar was initiated by King Philip IV of France. Philip, who was heavily in debt due to his lavish policies and military endeavours, saw eliminating the Templars as a way of alleviating his financial hardship and at the same time eliminating a powerful rival. In addition, the Templars were difficult to control by secular authorities due to their international networks and their special rights, which placed them directly under the Church, which Philip perceived as a threat. At the same time, Philip had been embroiled in a bitter conflict with Pope Boniface VIII over the question of the division of power between the Church and the Crown. After Boniface's death and the election of the French Pope Clement V, Philip saw his opportunity to further extend his control over ecclesiastical affairs.

On Friday 13 October 1307, Philip had numerous Templars arrested in France, including the Grand Master Jacques de Molay. The arrests came as a surprise and took place simultaneously, which was made possible by careful planning. The Templars were accused of serious offences, including heresy, blasphemy, idolatry, homosexual practices and financial corruption. These accusations were most likely contrived to mobilise public opinion against the order and secure ecclesiastical approval for its actions.

Pope Clement V was initially reluctant to take action against the Templars, as they were directly subordinate to the Church and had been loyal for centuries. However, under the strong influence of Philip IV and his threats, Clement felt compelled to act. In November 1307, he issued the papal bull Pastoralis praeeminentiae, which ordered the arrest of the Templars throughout Europe. In the following years, ecclesiastical and royal investigations took place in various countries to examine the accusations against the order. While some countries, such as England and Portugal, treated the Templars less harshly, the procedure in France was particularly rigorous, as Philip had control over the trials there.

In 1312, the Order of the Knights Templar was finally officially dissolved by the papal bull Vox in excelso. This decision was made during the Council of Vienne, where the accusations against the Templars were discussed. Although many of the accusations could not be clearly proven, Clement decided in favour of Philip and dissolved the order for political reasons in order to end the conflict with the French king. The Templars' enormous fortune was officially transferred to the Order of St. John, but much of it ended up in the hands of secular rulers, particularly in France.

== Origins ==
The Poor Fellow-Soldiers of Jesus Christ, commonly known as the Knights Templar, originally began c. 1120, when a group of eight Christian Knights approached Warmund, Patriarch of Jerusalem and requested permission to defend the Kingdom of Jerusalem. Baldwin II of Jerusalem gave them quarters in the Temple of Solomon. Hugues de Payens was elected their master and the Patriarch Warmund charged them with the duty of keeping the roads safe from thieves and others who were routinely robbing and killing pilgrims en route to Jerusalem, which they did for nine years until the Council of Troyes in 1129, when they became a military order sanctioned by the Church encouraged substantially by the patronage of Bernard of Clairvaux, a leading churchman of the time. The Rule of the Order was based on that of the Cistercian Order, that of obedience, poverty and chastity. Their role was eventually expanded to fight in the Crusades. The Crusades wound down, and crusaders were eventually expelled from the area.

Throughout these years, the Templar order became wealthy and powerful. They received massive donations of money, manors, churches, even villages and the revenues thereof, from kings and European nobles interested in helping with the fight for the Holy Land. The Templars, by order of the Pope, were exempt from all taxes, tolls and tithes, their houses and churches were given the right to asylum and were exempt from feudal obligations. They were answerable only to the Pope.

== Events in France ==
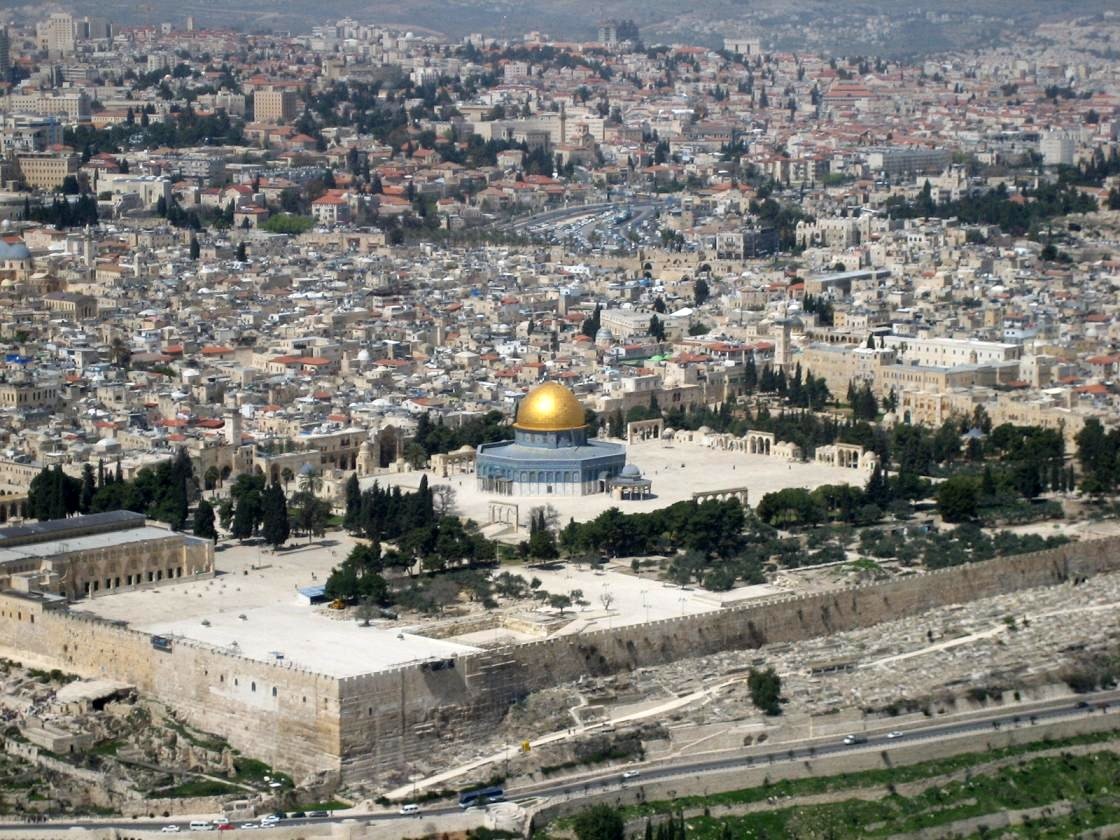
The first headquarters of the Knights Templar, on the Temple Mount in Jerusalem. The Crusaders called it the Temple of Solomon and it was from this location that the Knights took their name of Templar.

=== Prelude ===
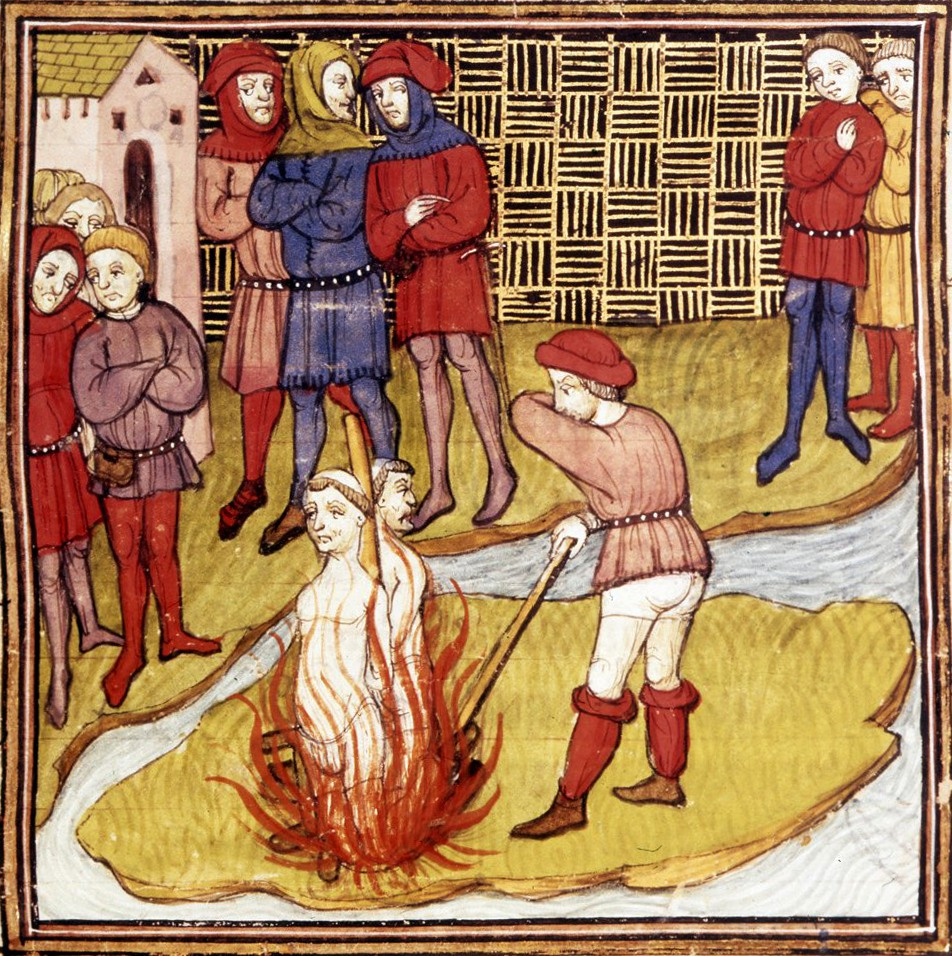
Two Templars burned at the stake; illustration from a 15th–century French manuscript

While the Templars had started off well and were at times considered the model of Christian knighthood, it was not long before resentment of their privileges, of their being "rich as kings", and criticism of some of their actions in war began to surface. For example, at the siege of Damascus in 1148, the Templars and Hospitallers were accused of accepting bribes to convince King Conrad III of Germany to abandon the effort. There was other criticism of their actions as well. Following the disastrous battle at the Horns of Hattin and the subsequent fall of Jerusalem, which some blamed on the Templars, they were left with almost no discernible military purpose in the Holy Land. Other critics also questioned their morals. The chronicler William of Tyre was often critical of the order and in one instance accused them of ransoming Nasr-al-Din, the sultan's son, for 6,000 gold florins. When Grand Master Odo de St Amand died in 1179, William called him "a wicked man, haughty and arrogant, in whose nostrils dwelt the spirit of a fury, one who neither feared God nor revered man" and that he was "mourned by no one". When the Templars took up banking and lending, the criticism only increased. Both Walter Map and John of Salisbury accused the Templars of avarice. Matthew Paris sometimes praised them while at other times was severely critical of the Templars. The loss of the last foothold in Syria, Tortosa in 1302, was yet another failure that left them vulnerable to their critics. As the obvious surprise and shock of their arrests in 1307 indicate, nobody thought the Order was flawed to the point it needed disbanding.

During this time period the power of the papacy had declined and most of the popes of the twelfth and thirteenth centuries found themselves either fleeing Rome or not allowed to enter at all. Also at this time antipopes backed by the German Emperors were common fixtures in the Emperors' bitter struggle with the Church. One of the last thirteenth century popes was Peter Morrone, an old man selected to be pope as a compromise, who as Pope Celestine V proved too old and too ineffective to rule the Church and upon realizing this himself, he abdicated. This caused a tremendous protest throughout the western Church and had a divisive effect on the next pope, Boniface VIII.

Pope Boniface was in many ways the opposite of his predecessor in that he was very capable, determined and even bold, but many held that a pope could not abdicate and that Celestine remained the true pope. Boniface in turn captured the old pope, who had sought nothing more than to retire in peace, imprisoning him until his death in 1296. Boniface VIII continued to impose his control on secular authorities, Edward I of England and Philip IV of France, who both protested against his authority, but Philip IV of France proved his most formidable opponent. Philip attempted to tax the church, which Boniface refused, beginning a long series of struggles between the two. Finally in 1303 Guillaume de Nogaret, Philip IV's lawyer, drew up a list of 29 charges including black magic, sodomy, heresy and blasphemy against Pope Boniface. In turn Boniface announced that he intended to place the Kingdom of France under interdict. This threat to Philip might have led to revolution, so de Nogaret and Sciarra Colonna, leading a force of 1600 men, attacked Anagni where the pope was in residence. They captured Boniface and held him prisoner for three days. After four days, however, the residents of Anagni rose up and expelled the invaders and took Boniface to Rome in triumph. But the ordeal had been too much for the 86‑year‑old pope and he died days later. Philip IV was determined not to have a pope interfere with his plans again and after a year the conclave was still unable to decide, so an outsider was suggested in the person of Bernard de Goth, Archbishop of Bordeaux. He had been a supporter of Boniface, but Philip arranged a meeting promising to support him as pope if he would agree to certain conditions, including reconciliations between France and the Church and absolution for any of Philip's men who had fought and captured Boniface. Bernard de Goth became Pope Clement V on 14 November 1305.

Philip IV of France, like his predecessors, employed Templars in his royal treasury in Paris to oversee a variety of financial functions of the French kingdom. There was little to indicate he had less than full trust in their integrity. In 1299, the Order loaned Philip the substantial sum of 500,000 livres for the dowry of his sister as well as his need of funds to fight the Flemish War, at which time he imposed taxes until his subjects were in revolt. When he debased the coinage, it led to an insurrection in Paris. The Knight Templar defended and gave the king refuge during the incident. But Philip had a history of seizing property and persons when it suited his needs, such as from the Lombards in 1291 and the Jews in 1306. In a meeting between Grand Master Molay and the pope, in either March or April 1307, the discussion revolved around problems in the order. In turn, in a letter to the King, Clement V told Philip that he intended a full investigation of the Templar order super statu templi (Latin: on/concerning the state of the Templars) in mid-October later that year. About a week before his planned formal investigation Clement V received a surprising message that members of the order had been arrested, imprisoned and charged with heresy by an inquisition the pope had not convened.

=== Plan and the arrest ===
On 14 September 1307, all bailiffs and seneschals (Note: Philip used salaried officials to enforce his laws; called baillis [bailiffs] in northern, and senechaux [seneschals] in southern France. These court officials were tasked with, among other duties, protecting the court while in session and executing legal processes.) in the Kingdom of France were sent secret orders from King Philip IV ordering preparations to be made for the arrest and imprisonment of all members of the Order of Templars; the arrests were to be executed a month later. At dawn on 13 October 1307, the soldiers of King Philip IV then captured all Templars found in France. Clement V, initially incensed at this flagrant disregard for his authority, nonetheless relented, and on 22 November 1307, issued the papal bull Pastoralis praeeminentiae, which ordered all monarchs of the Christian faith to arrest all Templars and confiscate their lands in the name of the Pope and the Church. The order went out to England, Iberia, Germany, Italy and Cyprus. The leader, Templar Grand Master Jacques de Molay, and Hugues de Pairaud, a Templar, referred to in various documents as "the visitor of France", who was the collector of all of the royal revenues of France owing to the Order, were both arrested, as were many other Templars in France.

Philip used his ministers and agents Guillaume de Nogaret and Enguerrand de Marigny who collected a list of charges against the Templars. Other witnesses were said to have been made up of expelled Templar members, previously removed for their misdeeds. Under the orders of the French king, they were arrested and severely tortured.

Soon after, in 1307, the Pope sent two cardinals to interview Jacques de Molay and Hugues de Pairaud. At that time they recanted their confessions and told the other Templars to do the same.

=== The specific charge of heresy ===
Several significant changes in legal procedures had been made by 1230 that affected later trials, especially those of the Templars. No longer did a witness need fear reprisals if his accusations were proved untrue. Instead, a new system relying on the testimony of witnesses, judicial latitudes (Note: Under canon law infamy, a person's bad reputation for something, was required to be established before that person could be brought to trial to determine if the accusations were true. But after 1270 a precedent was set that a defendant could be brought to trial without infamy being established and could be required to testify to any questions asked under oath. If a defendant confessed to a crime he was not advised he was being charged with, he could not later object on that basis; his objections, if any, had to come at the beginning of his trial. While it was no longer a requirement to advise the defendant of charges against him, a judge could specify the charges de gratia (as a favor). See: Henry Ansgar Kelly, "Inquisition and the Prosecution of Heresy: Misconceptions and Abuses", Church History, Vol. 58, No. 4 (December 1989), p. 449.) and the inquisitorial procedure began to dominate criminal trials in most of Europe. In France, the issuance of Cupientes in 1229 by Louis IX of France, Philip's grandfather, gave the kings of France the duty to eliminate heresy in his kingdom. Additionally, from 1230 on, the inquisitors in northern Italy had been given special powers by Pope Honorius III which allowed them to examine even the exempted and protected orders of the Hospitallers, Cistercians and Templars, but only in cases where heresy was suspected. When the Albigensian Crusade was over, these special powers were never revoked but simply forgotten. Philip's royal lawyers concentrated their charges on this one vulnerable exception, that of heresy, to an otherwise untouchable order, one which answered only to the Pope.

=== Charges against the Templars ===
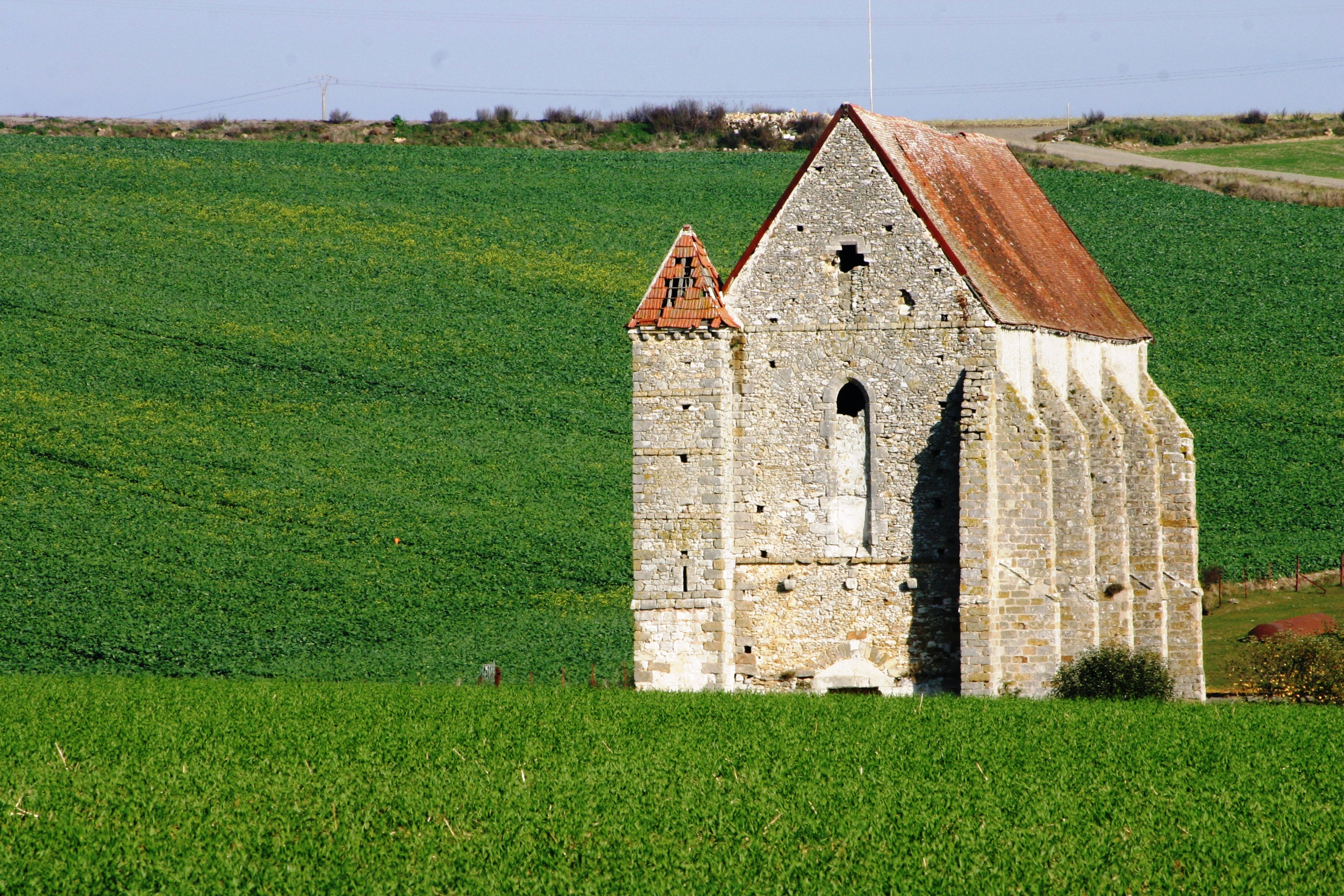
Templar building at Saint Martin des Champs, France

The initial charge against the Templars was heresy; more specifically, "when professing, the brothers were required to deny Christ, to spit on the Cross, and to place three 'obscene kisses' on the lower spine, the navel and the mouth; they were obliged to indulge in carnal relations with other members of the order, if requested; and finally they wore a small belt which had been consecrated by touching a strange idol, which looked like a human head with a long beard. On August 12, 1308, the charges would be increased stating that the Templars worshipped idols, specifically made of a cat and a head, the latter having three faces. The lists of articles 86 to 127[3] would add many other charges. None of these "idols" were ever produced.

=== The inquisitional trials ===
Of the various trials held in France, the first, and one of the larger trials, ran from 19 October to 24 November 1307, and was held in Paris. A total of 138 prisoners gave a full testimony and almost all admitted guilt to one or more charges. Since torture was used to elicit these confessions, the reliability of their testimony before this and other inquisitional tribunals remains an open question. What is known is these earlier confessions contradicted later testimony before the 1310 papal commissions in Paris. Another important trial that was held at Poitiers between 28 June and 2 July 1308 where at least 54 Templars testified before the pope and his commission of cardinals. Here too a considerable number of defendants confessed to one or more of the charges. When asked if their statements were freely given many said that, while they had been tortured or threatened, restricted to bread and water and other forms of harsh treatments had been imposed on them, their confessions were not the results of any torture. But in 1310 at least three said they had lied in front of the Pope and now wished to defend the order.

Templar Peter (Pierre) of Bologna was trained as a canon lawyer and was the Templar representative to the papal court in Rome. On 23 April 1310, Peter, with others, went before the commission and demanded what amounts to full disclosure of their accusers and all the information and evidence gathered in the case. They also requested a ban on witnesses conversing with one another, and that all proceedings should be kept secret until they were sent to the Pope. In May 1310, the Archbishop of Sens, Philippe de Marigny, took over the trial of the Templars from the original commission. De Marigny conducted the proceedings against the Templars until his death in 1316. Pope Clement V interceded and directed that actual trials take place, however Philip sought to thwart this effort. Several Templars, who stepped forward to defend the Order, were burned at the stake as heretics to prevent their participation in the trials: Nicolas de Celles, Gauthier de Villesavoye, Etienne de Compiègne, Robert de Montreuil-aux-Lions (priest), Guillaume de Roy, Geoffroy de Cère, Eloi de Pavant, Raoul and Pierre de Compiègne. In total, 54 Templars were burned outside of Paris to block this legal process. When the papal commission met on 3 November 1310, they found the Templars had no defenders and adjourned until 27 December. At this time the prisoners insisted that Peter de Bologna and Renaud de Provins again defend them but were told the two priests had appeared before the commission of the Archbishop of Sens and that both de Provins and de Bologna were found guilty and had been imprisoned. Peter de Bologna, however, had managed to escape his confinement.

=== Recantation and death of Templar leaders in France ===
Eventually King Philip's Inquisitors succeeded in making Jacques de Molay confess to the charges. On 18 March 1314, de Molay and de Charney recanted their confessions, stating they were innocent of the charges, and they were only guilty of betraying their Order by confessing under duress to something they had not done. They were immediately found guilty of being relapsed heretics, for which the punishment was death. This effectively silenced the other Templars. Philip continued to pressure and threaten the Pope to officially disband the Order, and things came to a dramatic end in 1314 with the public execution by burning of leader Jacques de Molay and Geoffroi de Charney.

=== Trial timeline in France ===
13 October 1307	Templars arrested in France
14 October 1307	Guillaume de Nogaret lists original accusations against Templars.
19 October 1307	Hearings in Paris begin.
24 October 1307	Jacques de Molay, Grand Master of the Temple, confesses for the first time.
25 October 1307	Jacques de Molay repeats his confession before the members of the University of Paris.
27 October 1307	Pope Clement V expresses indignation at the arrests to Philip.
9 November 1307	Confession of Hugues de Pairaud.
22 November 1307	Jacques de Molay retracts his confession before the cardinal sent by the pope.
February 1308	Clement V suspends the inquisitors involved in the Templar affair.
17–20 August 1308	Chinon parchment shows pardons for leadership of the Templars, including Jacques de Molay and Huges de Pairaud.
14 March 1310	127 Articles of accusation read to the Templars who are prepared to defend their order.
7 April 1310	Defense of the order led by Pierre de Bologna and Renaud de Provins.
12 May 1310	54 Templars are burned at the stake.
17 December 1310	Remaining defenders were told that Peter of Bologna and Renaud de Provins had returned to their confessions and that Peter of Bologna had fled.
22 March 1312	The Order of the Knights Templar is officially suppressed.
21 March 1313	Hospitallers agree to pay Philip IV 200,000 livres tournois compensation.
18 March 1314	Jacques de Molay and Geoffroi de Charney are burned at the stake as relapsed heretics.

*Source for the majority of this timeline: Malcolm Barber, Trials p. 258

=== Outcome ===
After commissions of the Council of Vienne had reviewed all documents regarding the Templars, on 22 March 1312, Clement V issued the Papal bull Vox in excelso suppressing the Order of the Templars. In May 1312 by the bull Ad Providam he provided that all assets of the Order of the Temple were to be given to Knights Hospitaller, to maintain the original purposes of the gifts to aid the Holy Land. It further made a distinction between Templars who remained unrepentant and those not found guilty of any crimes or who had been reconciled to the Church. Philip IV, however, confiscated a huge sum from them in "compensation" for the "costs" of the proceedings against the Templars. Also, in England where inventories were made of Templar lands and assets, the papal order had no immediate effect. There were so many delays and stalling in handing over these lands that even as late as 1338 the Hospitallers had only nominal control of former Templar lands.

== Trials in England, Ireland and Scotland ==
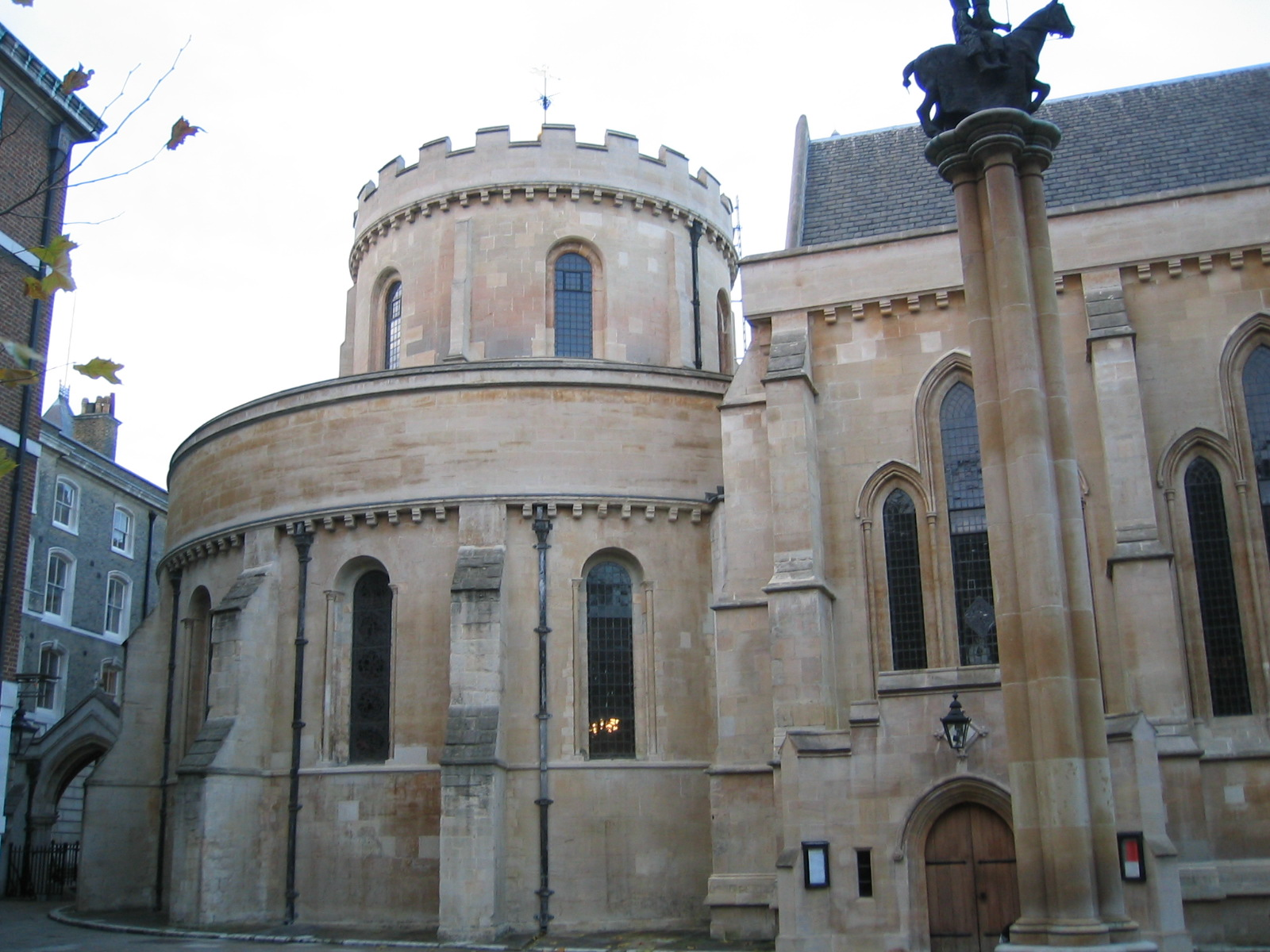
Temple Church, London. As the chapel of the New Temple in London, it was the location for Templar initiation ceremonies. In modern times it is the parish church of the Middle and Inner Temples, two of the Inns of Court. It is a popular tourist attraction.

In 1307, the Templar Order in the British Isles was thought to be rich in possessions but few in members. (Note: The records of inventories taken of Templar properties in England in 1309 and 1309 show the yearly receipts from all Templar lands in the British Isles amounted to less than £5,000. The number of Templars themselves was found to be approximately 144, only 20 of whom were knights. The inventories taken of Templars' movable property: household goods, agricultural implements, food, clothing, books and weapons was found to be much less than expected. In fact, looking at all the evidences they seemed to have lived a simple life devoid of most luxuries. See:) At the time of the arrest of the Templars in France, Edward II doubted the accusations against the Order and summoned Guienne de Dene, his seneschal in Agen to give his account of the matter. Upon reading the report Edward was still unconvinced and on 30 October sent letters to Pope Clement V, and to the Kings of Portugal, Castile, Aragon and Sicily defending the Order of the Templars and encouraged them to do the same.

Edward then wrote again to the Pope on 10 December in which he states: "he is unable to credit the horrible charges against the Knights Templar who everywhere bear a good name in England". He also requests more proof of the accusations and noted that the financial and other dealings between the English monarchy and the Templars had always been straightforward and honest, and that they had fought alongside King Richard in the defense of the Holy Land. On 20 December 1307, he received the order from the Pope to arrest the Templars. Edward finally issued orders to his officers to arrest all Templars in England, Ireland and Scotland, and to confiscate and inventory all their properties. But despite the Pope's order, Edward went about the handling of the Templars in a very different way than Philip. Many Templars were allowed an easy confinement, received allowances and remained in relative comfort. In 1308 the situation changed with the exile of Edward's favorite, Piers Gaveston. Edward requested help from both Clement V and Philip IV in order to have Gaveston returned to England. In turn it was perhaps more than coincidental he hardened his attitude towards the Templars.

On 13 September 1309, two Inquisitors were brought to England and allowed to question the Templars but in the presence of English prelates and as of November 1309, none of the Templars would confess to the charges. At that time torture was rarely used in England, while the legal system was well-formed and used regular jurors as opposed to the "professional witness, accusers and jurors" frequently used by Philip as tools to enforce his will. In December, the Pope put pressure on England and other countries to allow the Inquisitors to use "their" methods, namely torture, and reluctant approval was given by the King of England. The conditions that the Templars were living in were radically changed and, as with continued pressure by the Pope and Inquisition on the King and local prelates, the inevitable result was obtained. The English Templars were sent to the Count of Ponthieu which did not adhere to English Law. Various confessions, different in many ways, were nonetheless obtained and the Templars were either executed or sent to prison for life. Two Templars, both from England, were examined by the Bishop of St. Andrews in Scotland and ended up with confessions of minor offenses, while in Ireland, fourteen Templars subjected to three trials netted likewise minor confessions that amounted to nothing.

== Trials in Cyprus ==
The Templars, along with the Hospitallers had moved their main bases of operations to Cyprus after the fall of Acre in 1291. The Hospitallers, however, attacked and in 1308 captured the island of Rhodes and moved their headquarters there leaving Cyprus to the Templars. This made Cyprus of particular importance to the pope since it was now the Templar base of operations. In May 1308 a letter from the pope was brought to Cyprus by Prior Hayden which ordered the arrest of all the Templars on the island. Amalric, Lord of Tyre was ruling Cyprus at the time and had overthrown his brother Henry II of Cyprus with the help of the Templars. Amalric was slow to implement the arrests giving the Templar knights ample time to prepare their defenses. But in June the Templars surrendered, their properties and treasure seized, and they were held at Khirokitia and later Yermasoyia, then finally Pano Lefkara, where they remained for three years. May 1310 found King Henry II restored to his throne and, unlike his brother, he complied with the Pope's demands to bring them to trial. They seemed to have received a fair trial in spite of Henry II's dislike for the order. All seventy-six Templars denied the charges and numerous witnesses testified as to their innocence. The trials ended in acquitting all Templars of all charges. The pope demanded Henry II hold new trials and sent a personal delegate, Dominic of Palestrina, to insure the pope's wishes were carried out. The result of the 1311 trials was not recorded but they were still in prison when the pope decreed the order to disband the order and transfer all their possessions to the Hospitallers. But the Hospitallers received the properties only, the treasure and movable goods were retained by Cypriot authorities to cover the unusually high costs of the trials. The leaders were never released and died in prison.

== Events in Germany ==
The records in Germany of Templars, not nearly as numerous in Germany as in France, drew little attention in German annals and chronicles. Proving how little was actually known in Germany regarding the demise of the Templars, one annalist recorded the Templars were destroyed, with the approval of Emperor Henry, for their collusion with the Saracens and for the reason they intended to establish a new empire for themselves. The writers were not even aware of the actual charges leveled by Philip IV of France. But in a letter by the German king, Albert I of Germany, dated 13 January 1308, replying to Philip IV of France, the king expressed himself regarding the arrests of the Templars. He wrote, "although a crime of such evil infamy ought to be reprehensible and damnable in all persons, nevertheless it is known to be more reprehensible among the religious, who ought by the splendour of their life to be mirror for others and an example".

The actions taken against Templars in Germany varied by province. Burchard III of Magdeburg, appointed prince-archbishop in 1307, was already hostile towards the Templars, and in 1308 ordered the Templars in his province seized. He had some Templars burned and then attempted to keep their property for himself which led to a war with the Templars. In 1318, the Hospitallers had still not received the Templar property from him and as Clement was dead, they complained to Pope John XXII. Despite the orders of the papal bull issued in 1307, and other than the events in Magdeburgh, the papal orders received little attention in Germany. At times witnesses found the Templars innocent, though the Pope was adamant.

In 1310 at Trier near Luxembourg, an inquest with seventeen witnesses, including three Templars, was heard. Though their property was seized, they were acquitted. At Mainz, the Templars' leaders testified that since the crosses on the mantle of the Templars did not burn, it was a miracle and a sign of their innocence. Despite mounting pressure, popular opinion stayed with the Templars. Though they were told by the Pope to go back and do their work, the result again was acquittal.

== Events in Spain and Portugal ==
After the infamous trials of the Templars in France and the subsequent orders of Pope Clement V to dissolve the order, most countries complied, ceding Templar lands to the Hospitallers. Kings Denis of Portugal and James II of Aragon both proclaimed they found no fault of heresy, blasphemy or immorality in the Templars in their respective realms. This was not surprising since the Templars had become key to the success of the Reconquista in Aragon and Portugal and their vast holdings were critical to the continued security of these kingdoms. Ceding the Templar holdings to the Hospitallers posed a threat of foreign control of significant portions of both countries. Both kings sought to circumvent these outcomes and in Aragon King James convinced Pope John XXII in 1317 to form the Order of Montesa which received the bulk of Templar lands in Aragon and Valencia. In Portugal, the result of long negotiations with the pope by King Denis resulted in the formation of another new order, the Order of Christ formed in 1320, which saw not only the vast holdings in Portugal ceded to this new order, but also a great number of Templars themselves quietly joined the order. The problems caused by the downfall of the Knights Templar Orders in Valencia and Portugal were solved by the creation of two new orders, the difference being the Order of Montesa was given Templar and Hospitaller lands while the Order of Christ was simply a transition of the Templars and their holdings in Portugal.

== The Chinon Parchment ==
Pope Clement V absolved 72 of the Knights Templar in July 1308 at Poitiers after hearing their confessions. However, King Philip still withheld access to the leaders of the Order and it was not until August 1308 that a papal commission finally was allowed to hear from them and also grant them absolution. The evidence of these hearings has been based on indirect evidence until the discovery of the Chinon parchment in September 2001 by Barbara Frale in the Vatican Archives. The document had been previously overlooked by Vatican researchers for some time due to its damaged condition and being misfiled among other unrelated documents. The importance of the Chinon parchment is that it is an authentic copy under the seal of three of the cardinals sent by Clement V, Bérenger Frédol, Etienne de Suisy and Landolfo Brancaccio, who were authorized to judge the Templars in his name.

There was another account of the trials at Chinon, namely a second-hand report held in the French Chancery, described in the register of Pierre d'Étampes, (Note: For more on this register see the work by Henri François Delaborde, Notice sur le registre de Pierre d'Étampes, par H.-François Delaborde (Nogent-le-Rotrou: impr. de Daupeley-Gouverneur, 1900.) which was the only available account up until the discovery of the original parchment (and its authentic copy) (Note: the original parchment and its paper copy are shown to be in complete agreement as it is a true copy.) in the Vatican archives. A comparison between the two shows the French copy provides a somewhat different account of events at Chinon. The Chinon parchment shows the hearings were held by the Church only and that royal lawyers were not present, while the French document gives a different impression, that the official proceedings were held under the auspices of the Pope and the French king.

Other discrepancies between the two lead to the conclusion that the French document was an indirect copy based on verbal accounts and not from having access to the original parchment. There is one unresolved question as to the chronology, however. In the bull Faciens misericordiam (showing mercy) the Pope, Clement V, announced to Philip IV that Jacques de Molay and the other Templar leaders were absolved and reconciled to the Church; and that any power to judge them again was reserved to the Pope alone. This bull was dated 12 August 1308, eight days before the hearings with these leaders was actually held. Whether this was an internal error in dating or the Pope was certain of the outcome before the hearings is not known and needs to be investigated further. While it remains less than clear as to what exactly happened at Chinon castle between 17–20 August 1308, further investigations may provide new answers.

== Bibliography ==
- Howarth, Stephen (1982). The Knights Templar. New York: Dorset Press. ISBN 9780880296632.
- Pringle, Denys (2007). The city of Jerusalem. The Churches of the Crusader Kingdom of Jerusalem. Vol. 3. New York: Cambridge University Press. ISBN 9780521172837.
- Barber, Malcolm (1998). The new knighthood: a history of the Order of the Temple. Cambridge: Cambridge University Press. ISBN 9781107604735.
- Lea, Henry Charles (1901). The History of the Inquisition of the Middle Ages. New York: Harper & Bros. ISBN 9781108014571.
- Addison, C. G. (2007). The Knights Templar and the Temple Church. Kessinger. ISBN 9780857069528.
- Barber, Malcolm (2006). The Trial of the Templars. Cambridge University Press. ISBN 9780521457279.
- Menache, Sophia (1993). "The Templar Order: A Failed Ideal?". The Catholic Historical Review. 79 (1).
- Gilmour-Bryson, Anne (1998). The Trial of the Templars in Cyprus. Leiden; Boston; Cologne: Brill. ISBN 9789004100800.
- Rall, Karen (2007). Knights Templar Encyclopedia: The Essential Guide to the People, Places, Events, and Symbols of the Order of the Temple. Franklin Lakes, New Jersey: Career Press. ISBN 9781564149268.
- Campbell, G. A. (1937). The Knights Templar: Their Rise and Fall. London: Duckworth. ISBN 9780404170059.
- Frale, Barbara (2004). "The Chinon chart: Papal absolution to the last Templar, Master Jacques de Molay". The Journal of Medieval History. 30 (2). doi:10.1016/j.jmedhist.2004.03.004.
- Peters, Edward (1989). Inquisition. Berkeley: University of California Press. OCLC 254011743.
- Gilmour-Bryson, Anne (1982). The trial of the Templars in the Papal State and the Abruzzi. Vatican City: Vatican Apostolic Library. ISBN 9788821005251.
- Sobecki, Sebastian (2006). Philippe de Marigny. Biographisch-bibliographisches Kirchenlexikon. Vol. 26. Nordhausen: Bautz. ISBN 9783883093543.
- Perkins, Clarence (1910). "The Wealth of the Knights Templars in England and the Disposition of it after their Dissolution". The American Historical Review. 15 (2): 252–263. doi:10.1086/ahr/15.2.252.
- Burgtorf, Jochen; Crawford, Paul; Nicholson, Helen J. (2010). The Debate on the Trial of the Templars, 1307–1314. Surrey, England; Burlington, Vermont: Ashgate. ISBN 9780754665700.
- Landon, Lionel (1935). The itinerary of King Richard I : with studies on certain matters of interest connected with his reign. London: Pipe Roll Society. OCLC 8671200.
- Perkins, Clarence (1909). "The Trial of the Knights Templars in England". The English Historical Review. 24 (95).
- Runciman, Steven (1967). The Kingdom of Acre and the later Crusades. A History of the Crusades. Vol. III. New York: Harper & Row. OCLC 230067005.
- Barber, M. C. (1984). "The Social Context of the Templars". Transactions of the Royal Historical Society. 34. doi:10.2307/3679124. JSTOR 3679124.
- Valente, José (1998). "The New Frontier: The Role of the Knights Templar in the Establishment of Portugal as an Independent Kingdom". Mediterranean Studies. 7.
- O'Callaghan, Joseph F. (1983). A History of Medieval Spain. London: Cornell University Press. ISBN 9780801468728.
