= Chinon Parchment =

French historical document (dated 1308)

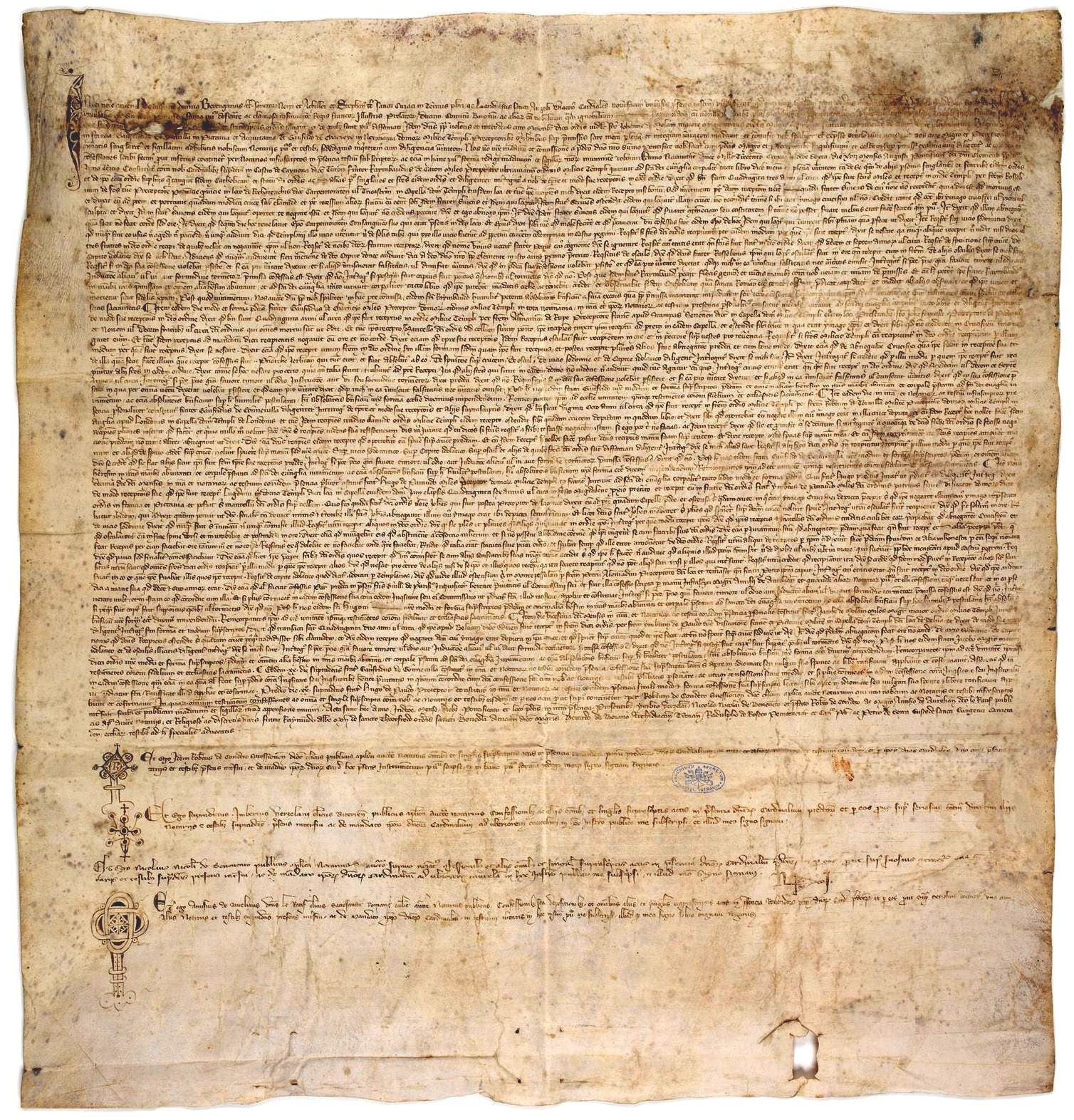
Photograph of the original Parchment.

The Chinon Parchment is a historical document discovered in September 2001 by Barbara Frale, an Italian paleographer at the Vatican Apostolic Archive. On the basis of this document she has claimed that, in 1308, Pope Clement V absolved the last Grand Master, Jacques de Molay, and the rest of the leadership of the Knights Templar from charges brought against them by the Medieval Inquisition.

The Parchment is dated 17–20 August 1308 at Chinon, France, and was written by Bérenger Frédol, Etienne de Suisy and Landolfo Brancacci, Cardinals who were of Saints Nereus and Achileus, St. Cyriac in Thermis and Sant'Angelo in Pescheria respectively. The Vatican keeps an authentic copy with reference number Archivum Arcis Armarium D 218, the original having the number D 217 (see below for the other Chinon Parchment published by Étienne Baluze in 1693).

The existence of this document has long been assumed. In the bull Faciens misericordiam, promulgated in August 1308, Clement V explained that Templar leaders were supposed to be brought to Poitiers in order to be questioned by the Pope himself, but "since some of them were so unwell at that time that they could not ride and could not by any means be brought into our (i.e. the Pope's) presence" three cardinals were sent out to perform the necessary inquiries at Chinon. The commissioned envoys were instructed to create an official record of their investigations and, according to the bull, upon returning they presented the Pope with "the confessions and testimonies of the aforementioned Master and Commanders written down as spoken as a legal record by notarial attestation". In addition, a letter exists, supposedly written by the three cardinals to King Philip IV, in which they inform him of the absolution granted to the high-ranking officers of the Knights Templar (published by Étienne Baluze). The text of the Chinon Parchment is also supported by records in register Avignonese 48 of the Vatican Secret Archives, published in Processus Contra Templarios.

== History ==
In late June and early July 1308, a large group of previously arrested Knights Templar appeared before Pope Clement V and his commissioners in Poitiers. Five high-ranking members of the Order, including its Grand Master Jacques de Molay, were also supposed to be delivered to the Curia, but they were diverted to Chinon (less than 60 miles away from Poitiers). After the Knights Templar present in Poitiers were questioned and confessed their sins (generally following the lines of their previous testimonies given to French inquisitors) they were granted plenary absolution by the Pope on July 2, 1308. Clement V understood that his inquiry could not be complete without interrogating the leaders of the Order who remained at Chinon. The Pope arranged for three cardinals to visit Chinon as his plenipotentiaries. This allowed Clement V to finalize another stage of addressing the issue of the Knights Templar trials.

An investigation was carried out by agents of the Pope to verify claims against the accused in the castle of Chinon in the diocese of Tours. According to this document and another Chinon Parchment (see below), Pope Clement V instructed cardinals to conduct the investigation of the accused Knights Templar. The cardinals therefore

declare through this official statement directed to all who will read it . . . [that] the very same lord Pope wishing and intending to know the pure, complete, and uncompromised truth from the leaders of the said Order, namely Brother Jacques de Molay, Grandmaster of the Order of Knights Templar, Brother Raymbaud de Caron, Preceptor [of] the commanderies of Templar Knights in Outremer, Brother Hugo de Pérraud, Preceptor of France, Brother Geoffroy de Gonneville, Preceptor of Aquitania and Poitou, and Geoffroy de Charney, Preceptor of Normandy, ordered and commissioned us specifically and by his verbally expressed will in order that we might with diligence examine the truth by questioning the grandmaster and the aforementioned preceptors one-by-one and individually, having summoned notaries public and trustworthy witnesses. (Chinon Parchment dated August 17–20, 1308)

Raymbaud de Caron was the first to be interrogated, on August 17, 1308.

After this oath, by the authority of [the] lord Pope specifically granted to us for that purpose, we extended to this humbly asking Brother Raymbaud, in a form accepted by the Church, the mercy of pardon from the verdict of excommunication that had been incurred by the aforementioned deeds, restoring him to unity with the Church and reinstating him to the communion of the faithful and the sacraments of the Church. (Chinon Parchment dated August 17–20, 1308)

Also interrogated on August 17 were Geoffroy de Charney and, third, Geoffroy de Gonneville. On August 19, 1308, Hugo de Pérraud was the fourth Templar to be interrogated. The Grandmaster was interrogated last, on August 20, 1308.

According to the document, all interrogations of the accused, spanning August 17 to 20, 1308, were always in the presence of the notaries public and the gathered witnesses. Among the accusations were sodomy, denouncing God, illicit kisses, spitting on the cross, and worshipping an idol.

The body of the text details the appearances of the accused, their swearings-in, the charges against them, and the modes of questioning to which they were subjected. In the interrogation of de Molay,

When he was asked whether he had confessed to these things due to a request, reward, gratitude, favour, fear, hatred or persuasion by someone else, or the use of force, or fear of impending torture, he replied that he did not. When he was asked whether he, after being apprehended, was submitted to any questioning or torture, he replied that he was not.

The text further details the denunciations, requests by the accused of absolution, and the granting of absolution by the agents of the pope. All this was always in the presence of witnesses. Part of the pardons given to Molay thus reads:

After this, we concluded to extend the mercy of pardons for these acts to Brother Jacques de Molay, the Grandmaster of the said Order, who in the form and manner described above had denounced in our presence the described and any other heresy, and swore in person on the Lord’s Holy Gospel, and humbly asked for the mercy of pardon [from excommunication], restoring him to unity with the Church and reinstating him to the communion of the faithful and the sacraments of the Church. Chinon Parchment dated August 17–20, 1308

Analysis of the Chinon Parchment, as well as other materials of the Templar trials, enabled Barbara Frale to theorize on some of the secret initiation practices of the Templars. While three of the accused admitted to having been asked by their receptors during their initiation to denounce the Cross and spit upon the crucifix, their stories are inconsistent. Geoffroy de Gonneville, for example, stated that he had not succumbed under duress to denouncing and spitting on the Cross; despite this, he was admitted to the order, implying that the denial of the cross may have been a test of some sort. The other accused men admitted to "denouncing in words only, not in spirit". Gordon Napier thinks that the practice of the denial of the cross was training for what the new knights might later face, were they taken prisoner by Saracens.

All the accused denied practising sodomy or ever witnessing it; However, kisses were admitted, having been given as a sign of respect only during Templar initiation.

Hugo de Pérraud alone stated that, during his initiation, he had been told "to abstain from partnership with women, and, if they were unable to restrain their lust, to join themselves with brothers of the Order". And only Hugo de Pérraud claimed to see the "head of an idol" the Templars were accused of worshipping, in Montpellier, in the possession of Brother Peter Alemandin, Preceptor of Montpellier. All other Templars mentioned in the Chinon Parchment denied being encouraged to "join" with other brothers, and none of the others was asked about an idol.

All added that, as with any Roman Catholic, any transgressions of the Roman Catholic faith were fully confessed to a priest or bishop, penances made, and absolutions granted.

The Chinon Parchment itself was prepared by Robert de Condet, cleric of the diocese of Soissons and an apostolic notary; the other apostolic notaries public were Umberto Vercellani, Nicolo Nicolai de Benvenuto, and Master Amise d’Orléans le Ratif. Witnesses to the proceedings were Brother Raymond (abbot of the Benedictine monastery of St. Theofred, in the diocese of Annecy), Master Berard (or Bernard?) de Boiano (archdeacon of Troia), Raoul de Boset (confessor and canon from Paris), and Pierre de Soire (overseer of Saint-Gaugery in Cambresis). According to the surviving Parchment, the other notaries public made three other, more detailed copies. All documents were sealed and signed by the participants. According to the Parchment,

Their words and confessions were written down exactly in the way that they are included here by the notaries whose names are listed below, in the presence of witnesses [also] listed below. We also ordered that these things be drawn up in this official form and validated by the protection of our seals. (Chinon Parchment dated August 17–20, 1308)

The Chinon Parchment details a failed attempt by the Pope to preserve the Templars from the machinations of King Philip IV of France, through establishing that the Order was not heretical and was capable of reform under the aegis of the Church. However, as it became apparent that Philip had determined upon the extermination of the Order (and the confiscation of its considerable wealth and property within his kingdom), the Pope was forced to abandon the Templars to their fates by the threat of military force from the King. Outside France, the dissolution of the Order was achieved with far less bloodshed, and surviving members of the order were absorbed into other religious institutions.

== Significance ==
In September 2001, Barbara Frale, MA, found a copy of the parchment in the Vatican Secret Archives. Frale published her discoveries in the Journal of Medieval History and has written a book on the subject, Il papato e il processo ai templari.

In 2007, The Vatican published the Chinon Parchment as part of a limited edition of 799 copies of Processus Contra Templarios after centuries of obscurity, with an eight-hundredth (unnumbered) copy being presented to Pope Benedict XVI.

== Another Chinon Parchment ==
Another Chinon parchment has long been known to historians, having been published by Étienne Baluze in 1693 and by Pierre Dupuy in 1751. This other parchment is dated August 20, 1308, also at Chinon; it was written by cardinals Bérenger Fredol (cardinal priest of Saints Nereus and Achileus), Etienne de Suisy, and Landolfo Brancaccio (deacon of Sant'Angelo in Pescheria). Addressed to Philip IV of France, the parchment states that absolution had been granted to all those Templars who had confessed to heresy, and that the writers had "restored them to the Sacraments and to the unity of the Church".

== See also ==
- History of the Knights Templar
