= Council of Vienne =

Ecumenical council of the Catholic Church (1311–1312)

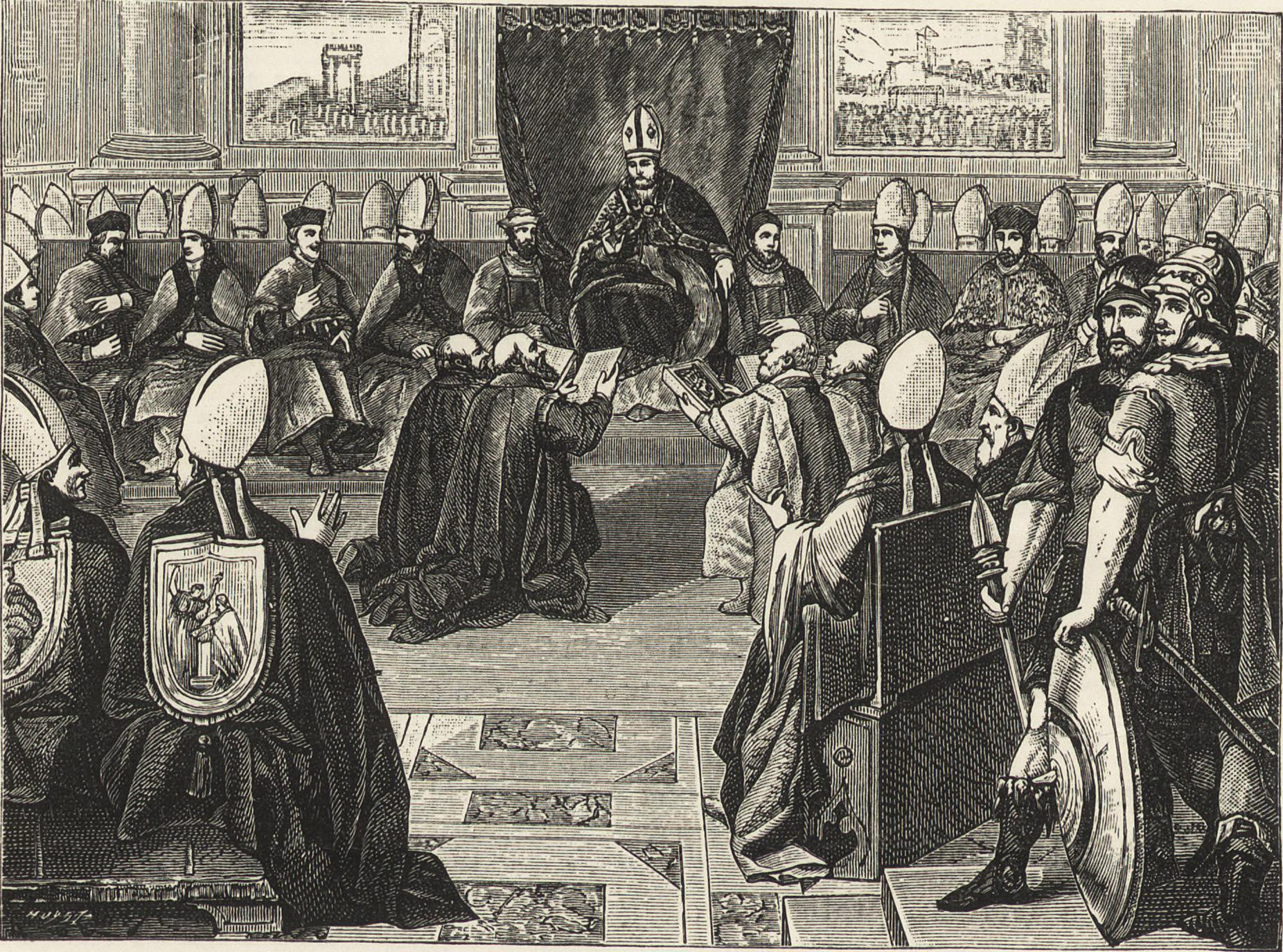
- Council of Vienne as depicted in Military and religious life in the Middle Ages and at the period of the Renaissance by Paul Lacroix
- Date: 1311–1312
- Accepted by: Catholic Church
- Previous council: Second Council of Lyon
- Next council: Council of Constance
- Convoked by: Pope Clement V
- President: Pope Clement V
- Attendance: 20 cardinals, 122 bishops, and 38 abbots (several more were barred by King Philip IV of France)
- Topics: Knights Templar
- Documents and statements: Disbandment of Knights Templar, King Philip absolved of actions against Pope Boniface VIII, crusade declared (but never carried out)

The Council of Vienne was the fifteenth ecumenical council of the Catholic Church and met between 1311 and 1312 in Vienne, France. This occurred during the Avignon Papacy and was the only ecumenical council to be held in the Kingdom of France (the previous two had been held in Lyon, which was under the Kingdom of Burgundy). One of its principal acts was to withdraw papal support for the Knights Templar at the instigation of Philip IV of France. The Council, unable to decide on a course of action, tabled the discussion. In March 1312 Philip arrived and pressured the Council and Clement to act. Pope Clement V passed papal bulls dissolving the Templar Order, confiscating their lands, and labeling them heretics.

Church reform was represented by the decision concerning the Franciscans, allowing abbots to decide how to interpret their Rule. The Beguines and Beghards of Germany were condemned as heretics, while the council forbade marriage for clerics, concubinage, rape, fornication, adultery, and incest.

The council addressed the possibility of a crusade, hearing from James II of Aragon and Henry II of Cyprus, before deciding to assign Philip of France as its leader. It was through Philip's influence that Clement finally canonized Pietro Angelerio, taking care not to use his papal title Celestine V. The final act of the council was to establish university chairs for Greek, Hebrew, Aramaic and Arabic languages.

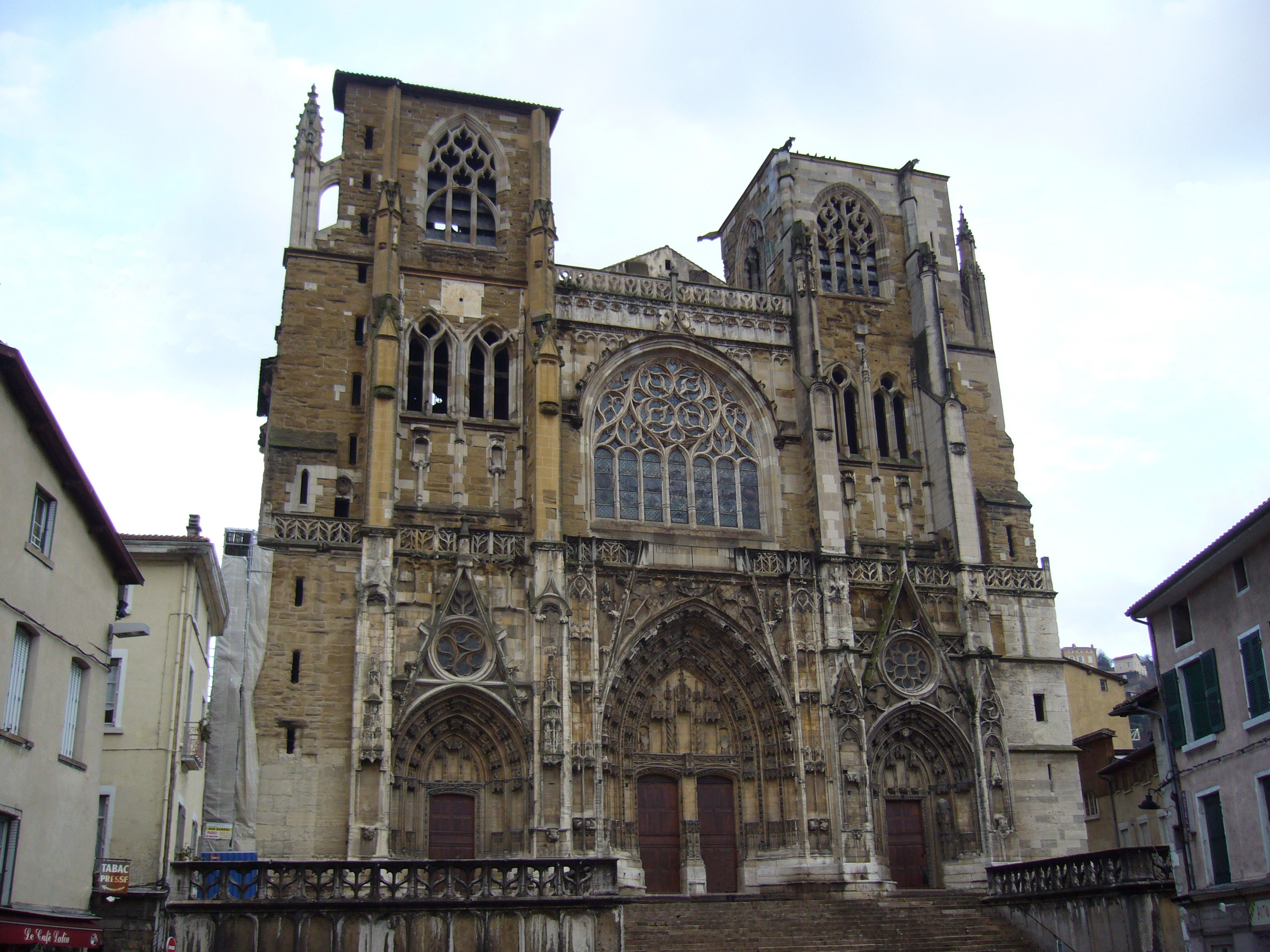
Cathedral of Vienne

== Background ==
The Knights Templar were a military order founded in the twelfth century to ensure the safety of pilgrims traveling to Jerusalem. However, following the Fall of the Crusader States, culminating in the Fall of Acre, the Knights Templar had lost their primary cause of existence. In the following centuries the order grew in power and wealth, getting integrated into the banking networks of medieval Europe. In the early 14th century, Philip IV of France urgently needed money to continue his war with England, and he accused the Grand Master of the Templars, Jacques De Molay, of corruption and heresy. On 13 October 1307 Philip had all French Templars arrested, charged with heresy, and tortured until they allegedly confessed to their charges. These forced admissions released Philip from his obligation to repay loans obtained from the Templars and allowed him to confiscate the Templars' assets in France.

The arrests of the Knights Templar, coupled with the defiance of the Colonna cardinals and Philip IV against Pope Boniface VIII, convinced Clement V to call a general council. Though the site of Vienne was criticised for its lack of neutrality (being under the control of Philip), Clement nevertheless chose it as the site for the council.

== Council ==
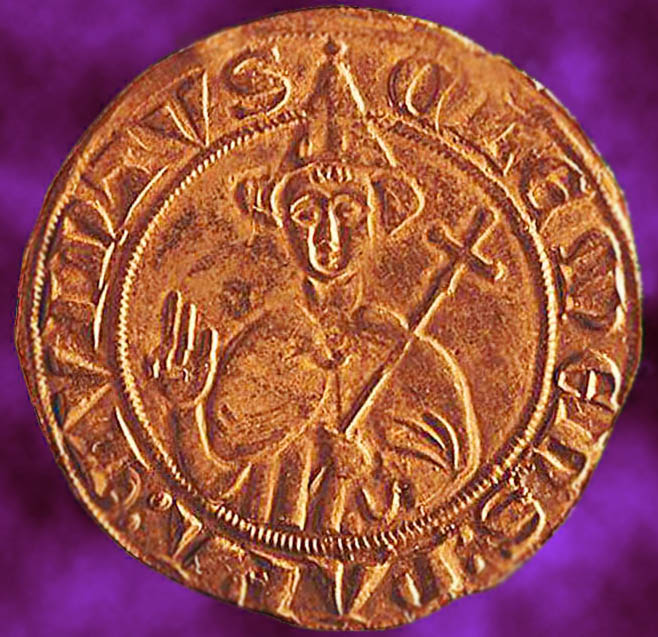
Pope Clement V

Pope Clement V convened the Council by issuing the bulls Faciens misericordiam and Regnans in coelis on 12 August 1308. (Note: Menache only mentions, Regnans in coelis as papal bulls summoning the council.)

The opening of the Council was delayed, giving time to the Templars to arrive so they could answer the charges put against them, and was not convened until 16 October 1311. The Regnans in coelis was sent to nearly 500 clerics, prelates, masters of militant Orders, and priors. (Note: Christopher Bellitto states Philip IV of France reviewed the list of attendees and struck names off the list) The attendees consisted of twenty cardinals, four Latin patriarchs, about one hundred archbishops and bishops, plus several abbots and priors. The great princes, including the rulers of Sicily, Hungary, Bohemia, Cyprus, and Scandinavia, as well as the kings of France, England, and the Iberian peninsula, had been invited. No king appeared, (Note: Andrew W. Devereux states James II of Aragon arrived in 1311 to push for a crusade to the Holy Land, starting with the conquest of Granada followed by the Maghrib.) except Philip IV who arrived the following spring to pressure the council against the Templars.

=== Knights Templar ===
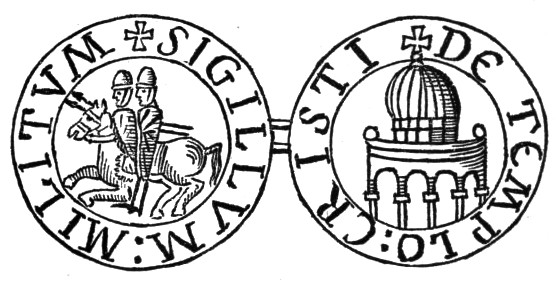
Seal of the Knights Templar

The main item on the agenda of the Council not only cited the Order of Knights Templar itself, but also "its lands", which suggested that further seizures of property were proposed. Besides this, the agenda also invited archbishops and prelates to bring proposals for improvement in the life of the Church. Special notices were sent to the Templars directing them to send suitable defensores (defenders) to the Council. The Grand Master Jacques de Molay and others were also commanded to appear in person. Molay, however, was already imprisoned in Paris and trials of other Templars were already in progress.

The Council began with a majority of the cardinals and nearly all the members of the Council being of the opinion that the Order of Knights Templar should be granted the right to defend itself. Furthermore, they believed that no proof collected up to then was sufficient to convict the order of the heresy of which Philip accused it. The discussion of Knights Templar was then put on hold.

In February 1312 envoys from the Philip IV negotiated with the Pope, without consulting the Council, and Philip held an assembly in Lyon to put further pressure on the Pope and the Council on the topic of the Templars. Philip IV then went to Vienne on 20 March. Clement was forced to adopt the expedient of suppressing the Order of Knights Templar, not by legal methods (de jure), but on the grounds of the general welfare of the Church and by Apostolic ordinance (per modum provisionis seu ordinationis apostolicae). The Pope then presented to the commission of cardinals (for their approval) the bull to suppress the Templars in Vox in excelso (A voice from on high), dated 22 March 1312.

The Council, to placate Philip IV of France, condemned the Templars, delivering their wealth in France to him. Delegates for King James II of Aragon insisted the Templar property in Aragon be given to the Order of Calatrava. The bulls Ad providam of 2 May and Nuper in concilio of 16 May confiscated Templar property. The fate of the Templars themselves was decided by the bull Considerantes dudum of 6 May. In the bulls Licet dudum (18 Dec 1312), Dudum in generali concilio (31 Dec 1312) and Licet pridem (13 Jan 1313), Clement V dealt with further aspects of the Templars' property.

=== Church reform ===
The Council instituted into canon law the ecclesiastical tradition of forbidding clerical marriages. Included in this were punishments for concubinage, rape, fornication, adultery, and incest. Any cleric who broke canon law was deposed, and their marriages ruled invalid.

==== Franciscan rule ====
Prior to the Council, Ubertino da Casale, formerly a friar at Santa Croce, Florence, protested that only a few brethren were following the Rule of Saint Francis. These brethren were called Spirituals. Upon arrival at the Council, the Spirituals, defended by Ubertino of Casale, faced opposition from those that ran the Franciscan order.

At the final session of the council, Clement issued the papal bull Exivi de paradiso reinforcing the previous bull, Exiit qui seminat, which left decisions regarding behaviour and accumulation of wine and grain to the abbot in charge of that monastery.

==== Disbanding the Beguines ====
In 1312, the Council and Clement's papal bull, Ad nostrum qui, condemned the Beguines and Beghards movement, a group of laymen and laywomen that lived in semi-monastic communities, as heretical. According to the Council, members of this movement were deemed heretics because of their antinomian heresy of the "Free Spirit". Following the Council's decision, there were instances where Beghards and Beguines were burned as heretics.

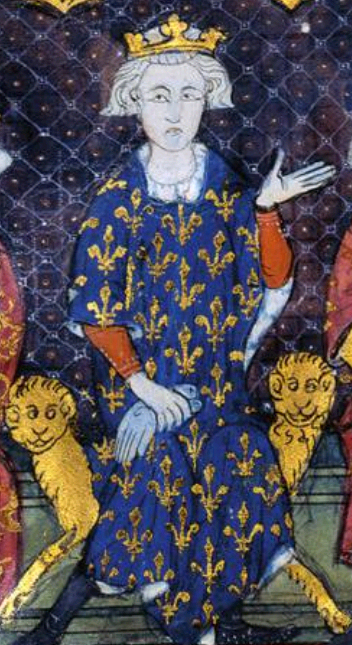
Philip IV of France

=== Crusade and Philip IV's vow ===
A crusade was also discussed as part of the Council. The delegates of the James II of Aragon wanted to attack the Muslim city of Granada. In response, the papal vice-chancellor suggested to the Aragonese delegates that the Catalans, now located in Thebes and Athens, should march through the Armenian Kingdom of Cilicia to attack the Muslims in the Holy Land. Henry II of Cyprus' envoys suggested a naval blockade to coincide with an invasion of Egypt.

On 3 April 1312, Philip IV vowed to the council to go on crusade within the next six years. Clement, however, insisted the crusade begin within one year and assigned Philip as its leader. Philip died 29 November 1314, but the crusading tithe instituted by the church had been spent by the reign of Charles IV of France.

=== University chairs ===
The Council decreed the establishment of chairs (professorships) of Greek, Hebrew, Aramaic and Arabic at the Universities of Avignon, Paris, Oxford, Bologna and Salamanca, although the chairs of Arabic were not actually set up. The delegates from Aragon pushed for the creation of an adequate place to teach different languages so as to preach the Gospel to every man.

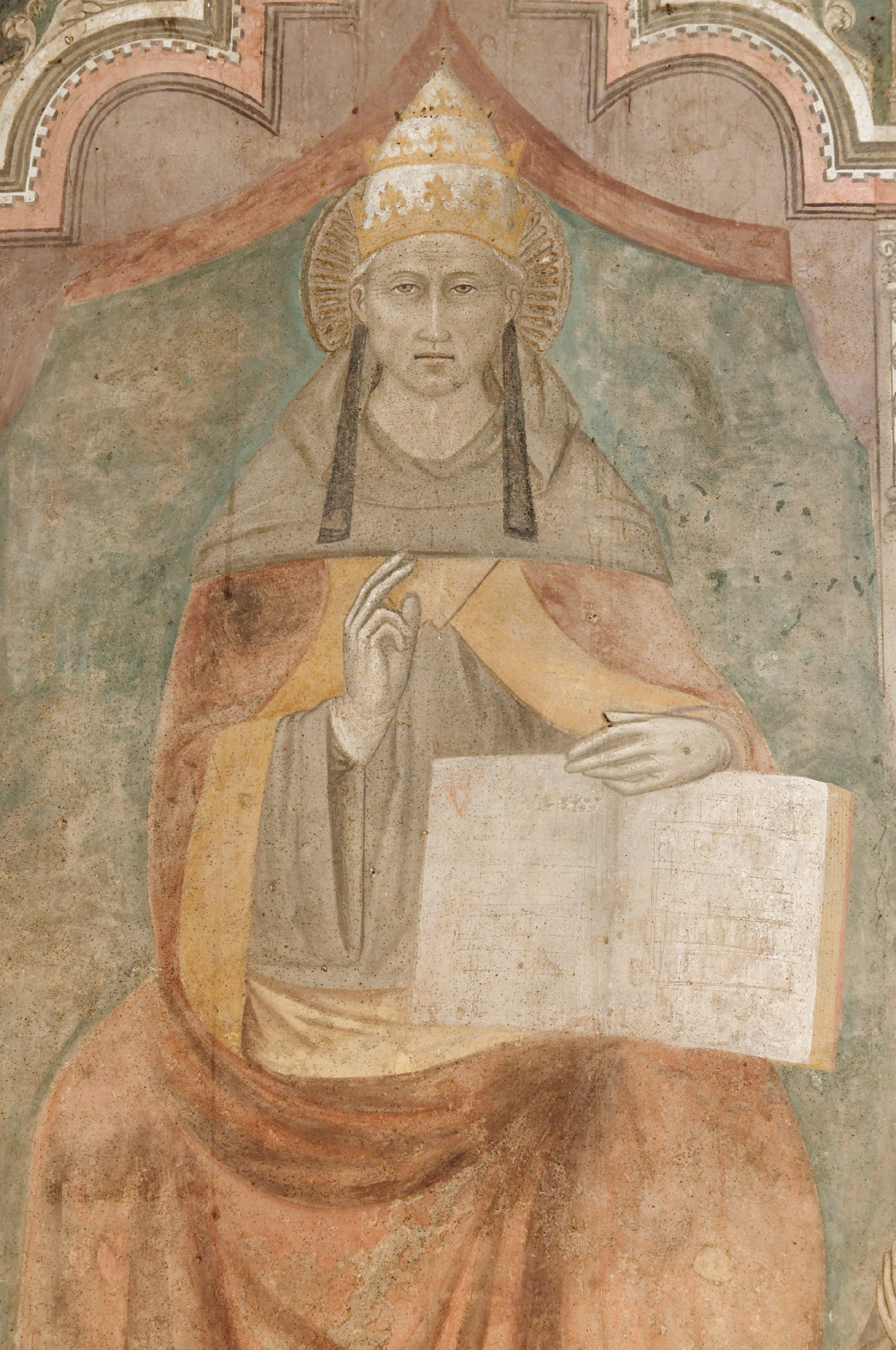
Pope Celestine V

=== Canonization of Peter di Murrone ===
The issue of Pope Celestine V's (Pietro Angelerio) sainthood was brought to the Council. There was division on his canonisation amongst the cardinals; the Colonna contingent voted for his canonization while the Caetera group voted against. Clement assigned a commission of prelates from outside the papal curia to investigate the issue. Clement was still hesitant to canonize Angelerio after the report was completed, until Philip IV's influence forced the issue. Clement waited two years to canonize Pietro Angelerio. Clement used his given name as saint, rather than his papal name of Celestine V refusing to fully surrender to Capetian influence.

== Aftermath ==
The Council ended on 6 May 1312. A Parisian chronicler, John of Saint-Victor, stated, "It was said by many that the council was created for the purpose of extorting money." The French ascendancy into the highest echelons of the Church hierarchy became very obvious at the Council.

According to the Friedberg edition of the Corpus Iuris Canonici all of Clement's decrees were made at the Council of Vienne. John XXII's prefatory letter, however, states Clement combined decrees drafted before and after the meeting at Vienne. In 1312, in anticipation of a revised version of the Council being drafted at the time, Clement ordered that copies of the Vienne decrees that were then in circulation be recalled or burned. The final draft was approved in March 1314, but Clement's death interrupted the distribution of the new copies.

== Sources ==
- Ames, Christine Caldwell (2015). Medieval Heresies: Christianity, Judaism, and Islam. Cambridge University Press.
- Barber, Malcolm (2012). The New Knighthood. Cambridge University Press.
- Barber, Malcolm (2012a). The Trial of the Templars. Cambridge University Press.
- Bellitto, Christopher M. (2002). The General Councils: A History of the Twenty-one General Councils from Nicaea to Vatican II. Paulist Press.
- Bradbury, Jim (2007). The Capetians: Kings of France 987–1328. London: Hambledon Continuum. ISBN 978-1852855284.
- Brown, Elizabeth A.R.; Regalado, Nancy Freeman (1994). "La grant feste: Philip the Fair's Celebration of the Knighting of His Sons in Paris at Pentecost of 1313". In Hanawalt, Barbara; Reyerson, Kathryn (eds.). City and Spectacle in Medieval Europe. University of Minnesota Press.
- Burr, David (2001). The Spiritual Franciscans: From Protest to Persecution in the Century After Saint Francis. Penn State University Press.
- Devereux, Andrew W. (2020). The Other Side of Empire: Just War in the Mediterranean and the Rise of Early Modern Spain. Cornell University Press.
- Douie, Decima Langworthy (1932). The Nature and the Effect of the Heresy of the Fraticelli. Manchester University Press.
- Fasolt, Constantin (2002). Council and Hierarchy: The Political Thought of William Durant the Younger. Cambridge University Press.
- Field, Sean L. (2012). The Beguine, the Angel, and the Inquisitor: The Trials of Marguerite Porete and Guiard of Cressonessart. University of Notre Dame Press.
- Finucane, Ronald C. (2011). Contested Canonizations: The Last Medieval Saints, 1482–1523. The Catholic University of America Press.
- Fudge, Thomas A. (2003). "Incest and Lust in Luther's Marriage: Theology and Morality in Reformation Polemics". The Sixteenth Century Journal. 34 (2, Marriage in Early Modern Europe (Summer)). Sixteenth Century Journal: 319–345. doi:10.2307/20061412. JSTOR 20061412.
- Gardner, Julian (2018). "Painters, Inquisitors, and Novices". Mitteilungen des Kunsthistorischen Institutes in Florenz. 60. Bd., H. 2. Kunsthistorisches Institut in Florenz, Max-Planck-Institut: 223–254.
- Georgiou, Constantinos (2018). Preaching the Crusades to the Eastern Mediterranean: Propaganda, Liturgy and Diplomacy. Routledge.
- Havely, N. R., ed. (2004). Dante and the Franciscans: Poverty and the Papacy in the 'Commedia'. Cambridge University Press.
- Hughes, Philip (1947). History of the Church. Vol. 3: The Revolt Against The Church: Aquinas To Luther. Sheed and Ward.
- Irwin, Robert (2007). For Lust of Knowing: The Orientalists and Their Enemies. Penguin. ISBN 978-0140289237.
- Jotischky, Andrew (2017). Crusading and the Crusader States. Routledge.
- Menache, Sophia (1998). Clement V. Cambridge University Press.
- Provost, Alain (2016). "On the Margins of the Templars' Trial: The Case of Bishop Guichard of Troyes". In Nicholson, Helen; Crawford, Paul F.; Burgtorf, Jochen (eds.). The Debate on the Trial of the Templars (1307–1314). Routledge. pp. 117–128.
- Rollo-Koster, Joëlle (2015). Avignon and Its Papacy, 1309–1417: Popes, Institutions, and Society. Rowman & Littlefield Publishers.
- Schilling, Heinz (2006). "Urban architecture and ritual in confessional Europe". In Muchembled, Robert; Schilling, Heinz; Monter, William; Tóth, István György (eds.). Cultural Exchange in Early Modern Europe. Vol. 1. Cambridge University Press.
- Setton, Kenneth M. (1975). "The Catalans and Florentines in Greece, 1380–1462". In Hazard, Harry W. (ed.). A History of the Crusades. Vol. III: The Fourteenth and Fifteenth Centuries. The University of Wisconsin Press.
- Tarrant, Jacqueline (1974). "The Clementine Decrees on the Beguines: Conciliar and Papal Versions". Archivum Historiae Pontificiae. 12. Gregorian Biblical Press: 300–308.
- Taylor, Claire (2013). "Evidence for Dualism in Inquisitorial Registers of the 1240s: A Contribution to a Debate". History. 98, No. 3 (331) (July) (331). Wiley: 319–345. doi:10.1111/1468-229X.12011.
- Venning, Timothy (2015). A Chronology of the Crusades. Routledge.
- Wacks, David A. (2019). Medieval Iberian Crusade Fiction and the Mediterranean World. University of Toronto Press.
