= Vox in excelso =

Bull issued by Pope Clement V in 1312

Vox in excelso ("A voice on high") is a bull issued by Pope Clement V on 22 March 1312. The directives given within the bull were to formally dissolve the Order of the Knights Templar, effectively removing papal support for them and revoking the mandates given to them by previous popes in the 12th and 13th centuries.

In view of the suspicion, infamy, loud insinuations and other things which have been brought against the order ... and also the secret and clandestine reception of the brother of this Order; in view, moreover, of the serious scandal which has arisen from these things, which it did not seem could be stopped while the Order remained in being, and the danger to faith and souls, and the many horrible things which have been done by the very many of the brothers of this Order, who have lapsed into the sin of wicked apostasy, the crime of detestable idolatry, and the execrable outrage of the Sodomites ... it is not without bitterness and sadness of heart that we abolish the aforesaid Order of the Temple, and its constitution, habit and name, by an irrevocable and perpetually valid decree; and we subject it to perpetual prohibition with the approval of the Holy Council, strictly forbidding anyone to presume to enter the said Order in the future, or to receive or wear its habit, or to act as a Templar.

— Vox in excelso

The issue of this bull followed a five-year period of suppression and trials of the Templars during which time they were accused of a variety of blasphemous and heretical crimes. However, the confessions were extracted with the use of torture and other methods developed by the Inquisition.

Other bulls involving Templars include Pastoralis Praeeminentiae and Ad providam.

== See also ==
- List of papal bulls
