= Hugh of Chalon =

Hugh, Hugues, or Hugo of Chalon may refer to:

- Hugh of Chalon (bishop of Auxerre) (c. 975–1039), French religious leader
- Hugh III, Count of Burgundy (1220–1266), called Hugh of Chalon
- Hugh of Chalon (archbishop of Besançon) (died 1312), French religious leader
- Hugh I of Chalon-Arlay (1288–1322), French nobleman
