= John of Chalon =

John of Chalon (French: Jean de Chalon) may refer to:

- Several members of the noble House of Chalon and its branches:
  - John, Count of Chalon (1190–1267)
  - John I of Chalon-Arlay (1258–1315)
  - John II of Chalon-Arlay (1312–1362)
  - John III of Chalon-Arlay (1361–1418)
  - John IV of Chalon-Arlay (1443–1502), also Prince of Orange
  - John of Chalon-Arlay (bishop) (1300–1335), bishop of Basel and Langres
  - John I of Chalon-Auxerre (1243–1309)
  - John II of Chalon-Auxerre (1292–1361)
  - John III of Chalon-Auxerre (1318–1379)
  - John IV of Chalon-Auxerre (1337–1370)
  - John I of Chalon-Montaigu (died 1302)
  - John II of Chalon-Montaigu (died 1337)
- Several bishops of Chalon
  - Jean de Mello, bishop in 1354–1357
  - Jean Germain (bishop of Chalon-sur-Saône and Auxerre), bishop in 1357–1361
  - Jean Rolin (cardinal), bishop in 1431–1436
  - Jean Germain (bishop of Nevers and Chalon-sur-Saône), bishop in 1436–1461
  - Jean de Maupeou, bishop in 1658–1677
  - Jean-Baptiste du Chilleau, bishop in 1781–1801
