= Hugh Despenser =

Hugh Despenser may refer to:

- Hugh le Despenser (sheriff) (died 1238), High Sheriff of Berkshire
- Hugh Despenser (justiciar) (1223–1265), son of the above
- Hugh Despenser the Elder (1261–1326), son of the above
- Hugh Despenser the Younger (died 1326), son of the above, favourite of Edward II
- Hugh le Despenser, Baron le Despenser (1338) (1308–1349), son of the above
- Hugh Despenser (died 1374) (1339–1374), second son of Edward Despenser, son of the above

== See also ==
- Despenser
