= Peter Partner =

British historian

Peter David Partner (15 July 1924 – 17 January 2015) was a British historian, particularly of medieval Rome and the Middle East.

== Life ==
Peter Partner was born 15 July 1924 to David and Bertha Partridge Partner in Little Heath, Hertfordshire. His father was with the Metropolitan Police and his mother ran a café in Barnet. During World War II, he served on minesweepers. After the war, he attended Magdalen College, Oxford to read law, but switched to history. In 1953, he married Leila May Fadil (d. 1990), niece of historian Albert Hourani. Partner worked as a journalist for many years with The Observer, writing the lead article the first week of the Suez Crisis. He also wrote for The Economist and broadcast frequently for the BBC on Arab topics.

In 1955, Partner accepted a position to teach history at Winchester College, where he remained for thirty years.

Partner wrote a number of reviews for The New York Review of Books, as well as articles for History Today, and the Journal of Ecclesiastical History.

He died on 17 January 2015 at the age of 90.

== Works ==
Partner was a historian of medieval and Renaissance Rome, as well as the Middle East, and was known for his studies of papal administration and diplomacy during the fourteenth and fifteenth centuries.

- The Papal State Under Martin V: The Administration and Government of the Temporal Power in the Early Fifteenth Century (British School at Rome, 1958)
- A Short Political Guide to the Arab World (Pall Mall, 1960)
- The Lands of St. Peter: The Papal State in the Middle Ages and the Early Renaissance (Eyre Methuen, 1972)
- Renaissance Rome 1500-1559: A Portrait of a Society (University of California Press, 1976)
- The Murdered Magicians: The Templars and their Myth (Oxford University Press, 1982)
- Arab Voices: The BBC Arabic Service 1938-1988 (BBC, 1988)
- The Pope's Men: The Papal Civil Service in the Renaissance (Clarendon Press, 1990)
- God of Battles: Holy Wars of Christianity and Islam (HarperCollins, 1997)
- Two Thousand Years of Christianity (Andre Deutsch, 1999); 2 vols. The First Millennium and The Second Millennium
- The Story of Christianity (Andre Deutsch, 2005)
