= Faciens misericordiam =

1308 papal bull opening the Trials of the Knights Templar

Faciens misericordiam (Granting forgiveness) was a papal bull issued by Pope Clement V on August 12, 1308, as part of the trial against the Knights Templar. It called for a new Ecumenical council to be held in 1310, and set out some structure for the collection of depositions from the arrested Templars.

== Date ==
The bull was written on August 8, and then read aloud on the 12th at the College of Cardinals.

== Content ==
The document created papal commissions which were charged with investigating the actions of the Templars. It also called for an ecumenical council to convene in 1310 to discuss urgent problems facing Christianity, such as the organization of a new Crusade. Regarding the Templars, the bull ordered the collection of depositions from Templars across Christendom, which would be gathered and brought to the Pope for determination on the fate of the Order, which fate would be decided and announced by the Pope at the 1310 council. The document made an important distinction that the fate of the Templars rested with the papacy, and no one else.

== Parisian Commission ==
The Papal Commission in Paris consisted of:

- Gilles Aycelin (Archbishop of Narbonne)
- Guillaume Durand (Bishop of Mende)
- William Bonnet (Bishop of Bayeux)
- Raynaud La Porte (Bishop of Limoges)
- John Montlaur (Bishop Maguelone)
- Matthew Napoli (notary Apostolic)
- John of Mantua (Archdeacon of Trent)
- William Argan (provost of the church of Aix)

== Council ==
A few days after Faciens misericordiam, the Pope issued the bull Regnans in coelis, which indicated more details about the upcoming ecumenical council. Though directed to convene in 1310, the council was delayed due to the length of the trial against the Templars, but was eventually convened as the Council of Vienne from 1311 to 1312 in Vienne, Isère, southeastern France.

== See also ==
- List of papal bulls
