= Barbara Frale =

Italian historian

- Born: 24 February 1970 (age 56); Viterbo, Italy
- Occupation: paleographer

Barbara Frale (born 24 February 1970) is an Italian paleographer at the Vatican Secret Archives. Frale has written books about the Templars and she has a special interest in the history of the Shroud of Turin. In September 2001, she found an authentic copy of the Chinon Parchment.

== Biography ==
She was born in Viterbo on 24 February 1970. She attended the University of Studies of Tuscia-Viterbo and she was the first graduated in Conservation of Cultural Heritage in Italy. Her thesis in Medieval History, which is based on the examination of more than 7000 notary documents of the 14th century, was published by the scientific publisher Vecchiarelli of Manziana (Orte 1303–1363. La città sul fiume, Manziana 1995), winning the first prize "Costantino Pavan", town of San Donà di Piave, both for the section "unpublished works" and "degree thesis". After her graduation, she co-operated with the Civic Museum of Viterbo and with the Government Office for the Archivist Heritage of Lazio. In 1996 she obtained a post-degree specialization in Paleography, Diplomatics and Archival Science at the School of the Vatican Secret Archives, and in 1998 she obtained also a specialization in Greek Paleography. In the year 2000 she obtained the Doctorate in "History of the European Society" at Ca' Foscari University of Venice. Also in 2000, she got a scholarship from the Historic Germanic Institute in Rome (Deutsches Historisches Institut in Rom). Since October 2001 she has been working as Paleographist at the Vatican Secret Archives.

== Works and publications ==
In 2001 she published for the scientific publisher Viella of Rome part of the results of her doctoral thesis, developed from the documents of the process against the Templars (Lʼultima battaglia dei Templari. Dal codice ombra dʼobbedienza militare alla costruzione del processo per eresia): her theory is that in the bill of indictment brought by the King of France Philip IV the Fair, which was quoted in the trial, and consequently was preserved, there was a series of real facts suitably distorted by the current affairs direction in order to build up an indictment of heresy, the only kind of crime for which the order did not enjoy total immunity. The Templars' fault, according to the author, was not the heresy but a secret ritual of admission as a military obedience test, containing vilification acts against religion.

In 2002 she published for Viella of Rome the essay Il Papato e il processo ai Templari. L’inedita assoluzione di Chinon alla luce della diplomatica pontificia, where she analysed and debated the content of a parchment kept in the Secret Vatican Archives and neglected for a long time by historians, which keeps the acts of an inquiry held by three plenipotentiary cardinals of Pope Clement V into the last Great Master of the Templars Jacques de Molay and other members of the Staff of the order, who were shut in the Castle of Chinon by King Philip the Fair. Consequently, the chiefs of the Templars having begged the Church's forgiveness, the Pope granted them absolution. The study of the parchment of Chinon attracted some international historians' attention.

The results of this research were then shown in the essay edited by Il Mulino, I Templari, Bologna 2004, which received positive remarks on the cultural pages of different Italian and foreign newspapers and was translated in English, French, Spanish, Portuguese, Polish and Czech. The book got a positive review by Umberto Eco, who called the author to draw up a chapter on the Templars for the Encyclopaedia about the Middle Age, of which he was the editor. Some theories supported by Frale are welcomed by experts of history of the Templars, among them Malcolm Barber, Alain Demurger, Franco Cardini and Simonetta Gerrini, pupil of Alain Demurger.

On 25 October 2007, the Vatican decided to publish a valuable reproduction of some of the most important documents of the process against the Templars, among those the famous parchment of Chinon, in the collection of Exemplaria Praetiosa; Frale wrote the historical introduction to the edition of the documents.

In June 2009, Frale published, always for Il Mulino, another essay dedicated to the Templars, I Templari e la sindone di Cristo, where she debates some documents concerning the mysterious idol, which was cited during the process as a charge against the order to accuse the order itself of idolatry, being actually a particular image of the dead Christ, which has similar characteristics to the Shroud of Turin.

In November of the same year another essay, La sindone di Gesù Nazareno, Il Mulino (historical Library) followed the above-mentioned volume, where Frale examines some presumed sketches of writing discovered on the shroud in 1998 by a team of French scientists, experts in the analysis of marks of the Institut Superieur d’Optique d’Orsay – Paris; comparing them with other ancient documents and inscriptions. This essay received the national prize "Torre di Castruccio" for the year 2010, the section of Letter, and the National Cultural Prize "Brava Barbara!” promoted by the Cultural Association "Santa Barbara nel mondo" of Rieti. It has been translated in French (Bayard, Paris 2010) and in English (Maveryck house publishers). In April 2010, Frale published for the Libreria Editrice Vaticana, the historical essay La Sindone e il ritratto di Cristo, and on 2 May she carried out the historical commentary broadcast live from Turin Cathedral, linked up to the Mass celebrated by Pope Benedict XVI on the occasion of his pilgrimage to the shroud.

=== Death certificate of Jesus ===
In November 2009 Barbara Frale claimed that she had discovered the burial certificate of "Jesus of Nazareth" on the Shroud of Turin, and that the date was in accord with the Gospel records. Frale stated that her reconstruction of the text reads:

"In the year 16 of the reign of the Emperor Tiberius Jesus the Nazarene, taken down in the early evening after having been condemned to death by a Roman judge because he was found guilty by a Hebrew authority, is hereby sent for burial with the obligation of being consigned to his family only after one full year".

Since Tiberius became emperor after the death of Octavian Augustus in AD 14, the 16th year of his reign would be within the span of the years AD 30 to 31.

Frale's methodology has been criticized, partly based on the objection that the writings are too faint to see.

== Recognition ==
Her book on the Templars and the Turin Shroud received the National Cultural Prize "Foemina d’oro" of the Cultural Association "La vecchia Lizza" of Marina di Carrara for the year 2009; in July 2010 it was translated in Portuguese (Edições, Lisboa) and in English (Maverick house publishers).

== Bibliography ==
- Le pergamene dell'Archivio comunale di Bolsena. Mostra documentaria, Bolsena: Dromos, 1994
- Orte 1303–1367. La città sul fiume, Manziana: Vecchiarelli, 1995 – ISBN 88-85316-57-3
- L'ultima battaglia dei Templari. Dal codice ombra d'obbedienza militare alla costruzione del processo per eresia, Roma: Viella, 2001 – ISBN 88-8334-037-X
- Strategia di un delitto. Filippo il Bello e il cerimoniale segreto dei Templari, Firenze: Giunti, 2001 – ISBN 88-09-02052-9
- Il papato e il processo ai Templari. L'inedita assoluzione di Chinon alla luce della Diplomatica pontificia, Roma: Viella, 2003 – ISBN 88-8334-098-1
- I Templari, Bologna: Il Mulino, 2004 – ISBN 88-15-09798-8, (The Templars, The Secret History Revealed, Arcade Publisher, 2009)
- I Templari e la sindone di Cristo, Bologna: Il Mulino, 2009 – ISBN 978-88-15-13157-7 (The Templars and the Shroud of Christ, Maverick House, 2011. ISBN 1-905379-73-0)
- La sindone di Gesù Nazareno, Bologna: Il Mulino, 2009
