= Pastoralis praeeminentiae =

1307 papal bull issued by Pope Clement V

Pastoralis praeeminentiae was a papal bull issued by Pope Clement V on 22 November 1307 to all Christian monarchs. It ordered the arrest of all Knights Templar and to seize their properties on behalf of the church. Clement was forced to support the campaign against the Templars by Philip IV of France, who owed them a great deal of money and had initiated the first arrests against the Templars on 13 October 1307.

Despite the papal request, not all the monarchs complied immediately, most notably, Edward II of England who at first refused to believe the allegations, but later carried out the order.

Following the arrests, a period of trials was sanctioned against the Templars, enforced by torture and pain-induced confessions.

== See also ==
- History of the Knights Templar
- List of papal bulls
