= Ad providam =

Papal Bull issued in 1312

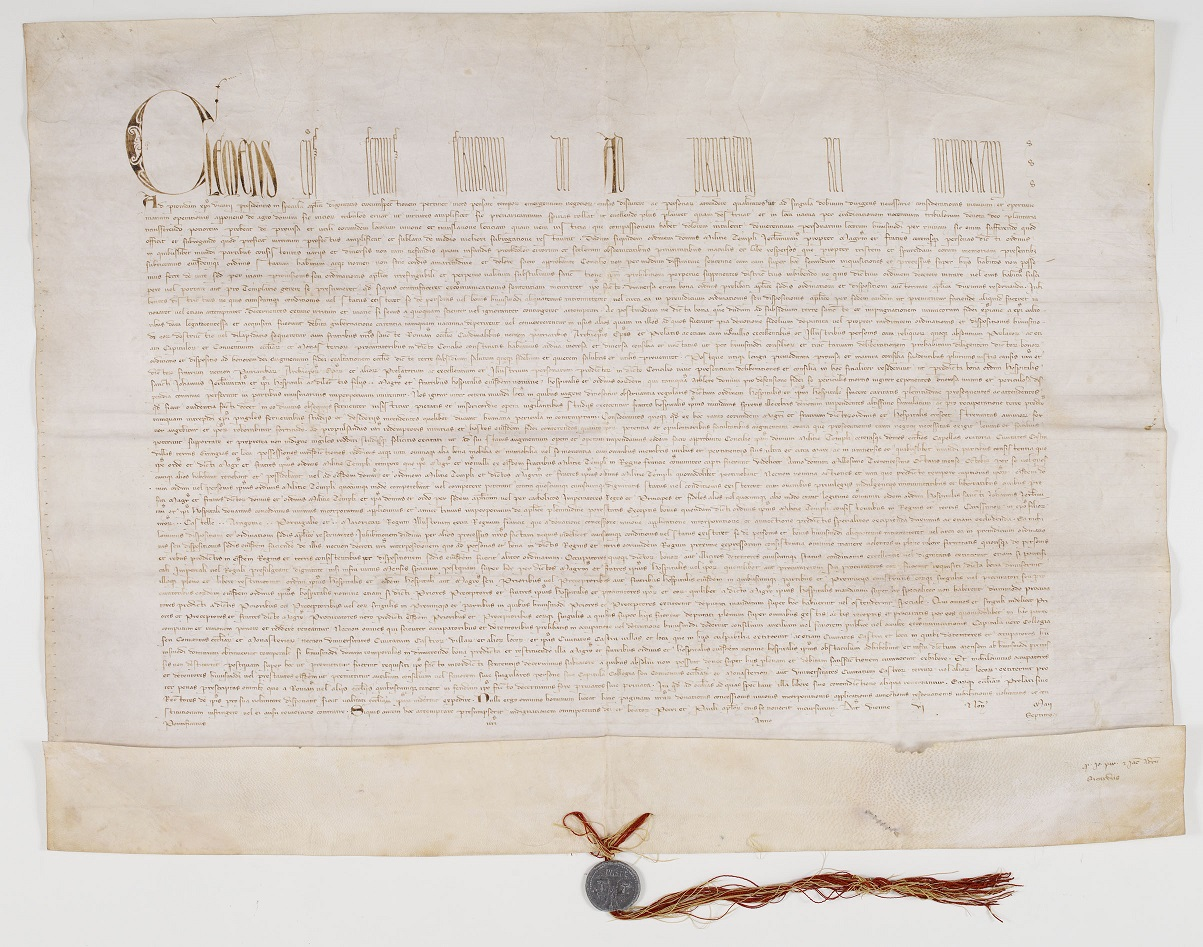
Ad Providam of Pope Clement V

Ad providam was the name of a Papal Bull issued by Pope Clement V in 1312. It built on a previous bull, Vox in excelso, which had disbanded the order of the Knights Templar. Ad providam essentially handed over all Templar assets to the Hospitallers (modern-day Sovereign Military Order of Malta), with the exception of some resources which were left to provide pensions to some Templars who had escaped execution and converted to a monastic life.

== See also ==
- List of papal bulls
