= List of Knights Templar sites =

With their military mission and extensive financial resources, the Knights Templar funded a large number of building projects around Europe and the Holy Land. Many structures remain standing today.

== Middle East ==
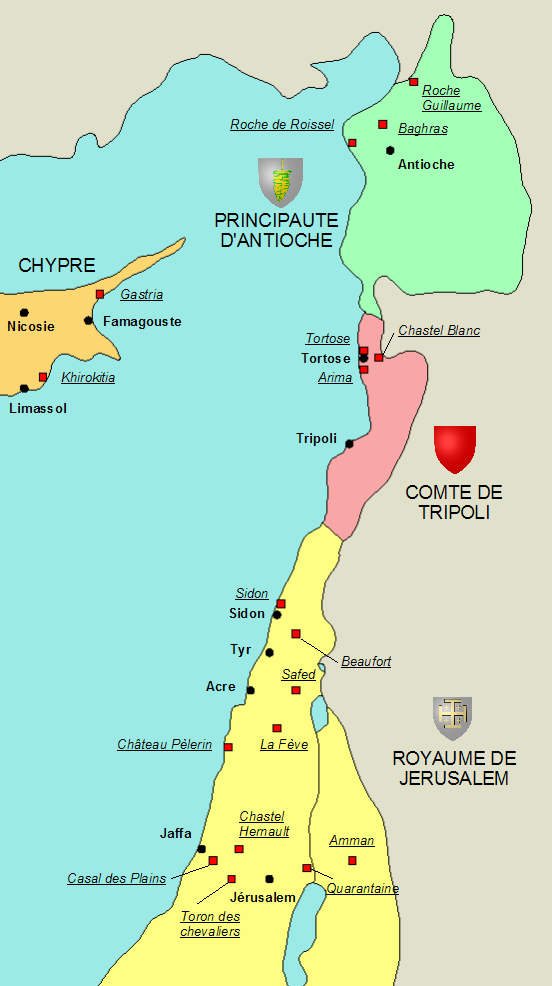
Templar fortresses in the Outremer

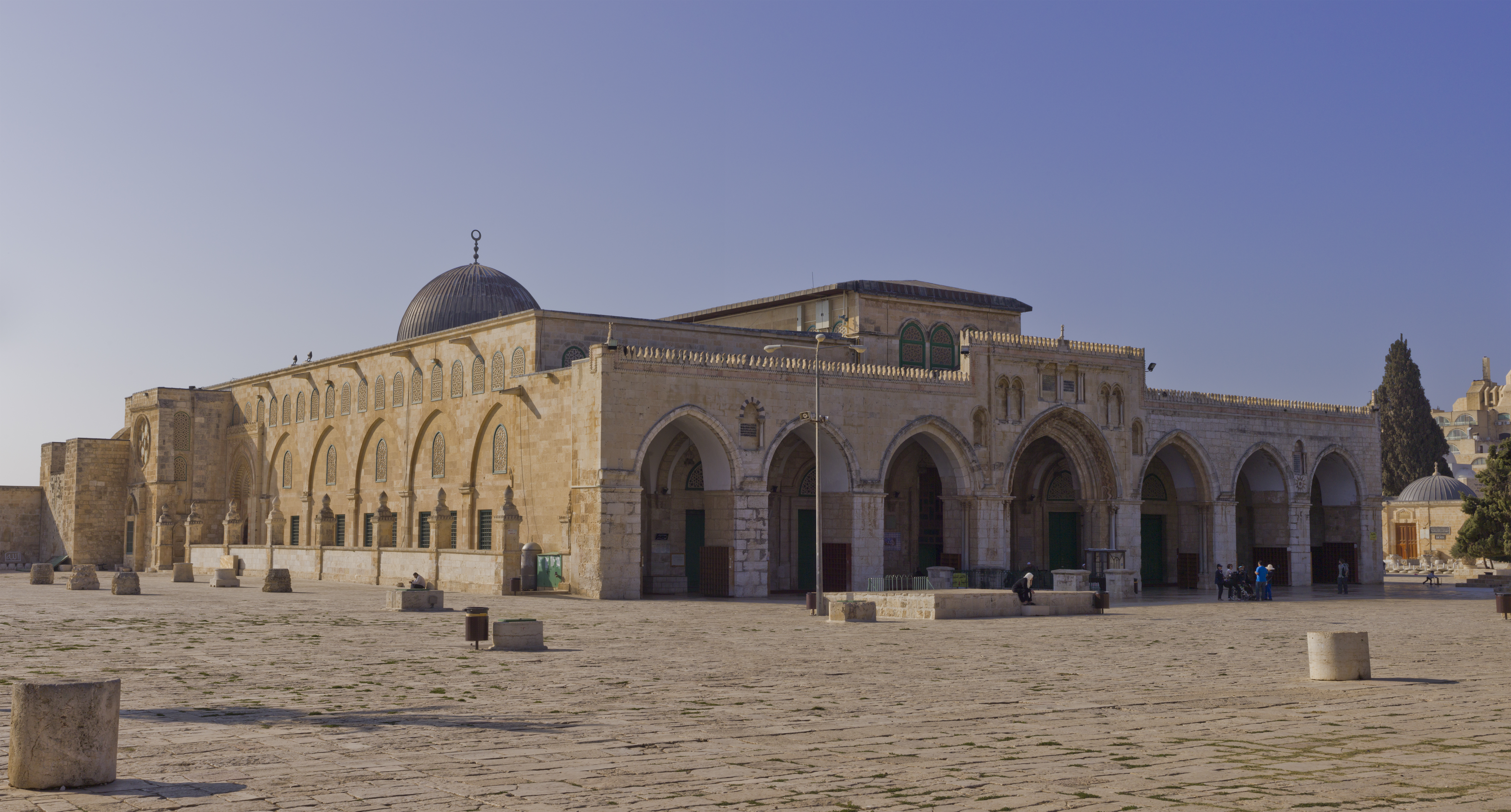
Al-Aqsa Mosque, Jerusalem: original Templar headquarters

In the Kingdom of Jerusalem, now in Israel and Southern Lebanon:

- Al-Aqsa Mosque on Temple Mount, Jerusalem, 1119–1187
- Le Destroit, built around 1110 by Hugues de Payens
- Castle of Merle (Khirbet el-Burj) near Tantura, 12th century to 1291 with interruption in the late 1180s
- Gaza Fortress, 1149–1187
- Chastel Hernault, 1150–1179
- La Fève, now Merhavia, 1160s to 1187
- Amman Fortress, 1166–1187
- Castle of Maldoim or Adumim (Rouge Cisterne, Arabic Qal'at ad-Damm) near Khan al-Ahmar, built ca. 1170
- Burgata inland from Netanya, until 1189
- Tel Yokneam (Caymont or Cain Mons) southeast of Haifa, ca. 1262–1265
- Yalo (Castrum Arnaldi) southeast of Ramla, 1179–1187
- A fortress in nearby Latrun, 12th century
- Safed, 1168–1188 and 1240–1266
- Chastellet du Gué de Jacob near Safed, 1178–1179
- Mount of Temptation, east of Jerusalem
- Tell es-Safi (Blanchegarde)
- Properties in Acre, Israel, including the still-extant Templar Tunnel
- Château Pèlerin (fr. "Pilgrim Castle"), also known as Atlit Castle, 1218–1291
- Sidon, 1260–1268
- Beaufort Castle, Lebanon, 1260–1268
- Jordan River Project, Israel, 1955 –
- Jordan River Project, Jordan, 1955 –

In the County of Tripoli, now in Northern Lebanon and coastal Syria:

- Chastel Blanc, 1117–1271
- Tartus (Tortosa) and its fortress, Templars headquarters 1152–1188 and fortress held until 1291, including the Cathedral of Our Lady of Tortosa
- Areimeh Castle, from the early 1150s to 1187 with interruption 1171–1177
- Arwad island (Ruad), occupied in 1300–1302

In the Principality of Antioch, now in Turkey:

- Roche-Guillaume, 12th century–1203 and 1237–1298
- Trapessac, in the 12th century until 1188
- Bagras (Gaston), 1153–1189 and 1216–1268
- Roche de Roissel, from the 12th century to 1268

The Templars also held commandries in Ascalon, Jaffa, Tyre, Laodicea, Rhosus, Alexandretta, and Ayas.

== Cyprus ==
- The Templars briefly owned the entire island of Cyprus in 1191–1192, preceding the establishment of the Kingdom of Cyprus
- Gastria Castle, 1210–1279
- Kolossi Castle, 1306–1313
- Fortresses in Germasogeia and Khirokitia

Also commandries in Nicosia, Famagusta, Limassol, Paphos, and Psimolofou, including the Twin Church of the Templars and Hospitallers in Famagusta

== France ==
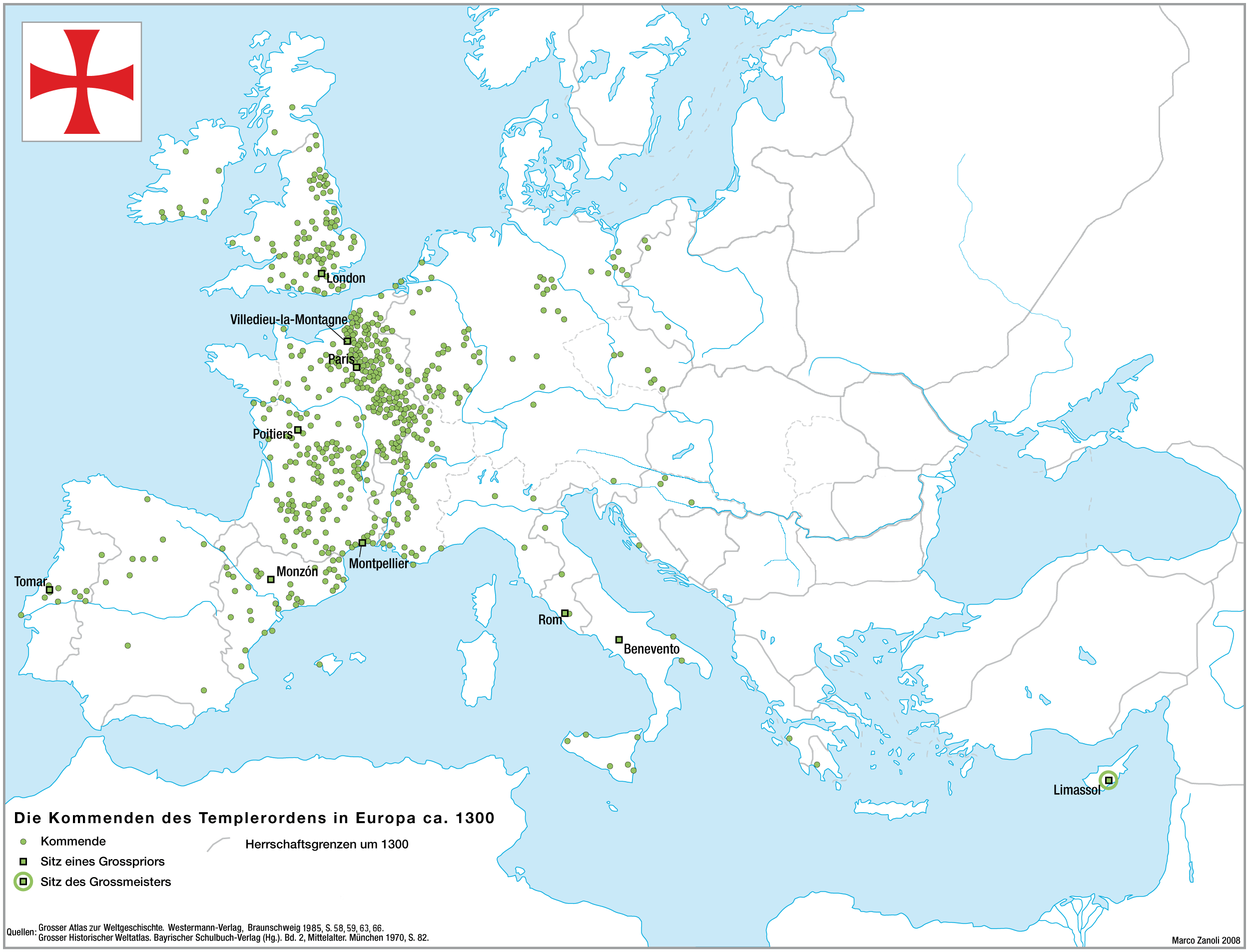
Templar establishments in Europe.

- Templar fortress of Paris, now destroyed.
- Commandry of Coulommiers, France
- Commandry of Avalleur, in Bar-sur-Seine
- Commandry of Saint-Blaise, Hyères
- La Rochelle, Charente Maritime, France
- Chapelle des Templiers de Metz - 12th-century Gothic chapel with octagonal plan and various paintings.
- Commandry of Libdeau, Toul - 12th-century Gothic chapel with rectangular plan and traces of paintings.
- Commandry of Notre-Dame-de-la-Boissière, Châteaudun - 12th-century Gothic chapel.
- Commandry of Sergeac
- Commandry of Dognon, Blanzac-Porcheresse - 12th-century chapel with rectangular plan and various paintings.
- Commandry of Sainte-Eulalie-de-Cernon
- Commandry of Richerenches
- La Couvertoirade, Aveyron - A castle, commandry and fortifications
- Commandry of Celles
- Commandry of Arville, now restored with a museum of Templar history.

Commandry of Épailly, Templar estate dating from the late 12th century with a large early 13th century gothic chapel, military structures and extensive barns in 21520 Courban

== Portugal ==
Convent of the Order of Christ, Tomar

- Castle of Almourol
- Castelo Branco
- Castle of Idanha
- Castle of Monsanto
- Castelo de Penha Garcia,
- Castle of Pombal
- Castle of Soure - received and reconstructed in March 1128, was the first castle of the Knights Templar.
- Old town of Tomar, including the Castle, the Convent of the Order of Christ and the Church of Santa Maria do Olival

== Spain ==
=== Crown of Castile and Leon ===
- Castle of Montalbán in San Martín de Montalbán, province of Toledo
- Castle of Villalba in Cebolla, province of Toledo
- Castle of San Servando, in Toledo
- The Templar House, Toledo
- Iglesia de la Vera Cruz in Segovia
- Castillo de los Templarios in Ponferrada
- Castle of Alcañices, in Zamora

=== Crown of Aragon ===
- Peniscola Castle
- Castle of Castellote
- Castle of Miravet
- Castle of Barbens
- Castle of Gardeny, in Lérida
- Commandry of Palau, in Palau-solità i Plegamans
- Castle of Xivert in Valencia
- Castle of Cintruénigo: the birth of a 12th-century gilda around the encomienda of Novillas, in the Valley of the middle Ebro, delimited by Queiles and Huecha, as a point of connection between the three kingdoms of Pamplona-Navarra, Aragon and Castile.

== United Kingdom ==
Sorted by county

=== England ===
- Bisham Abbey Berkshire
- Temple Church, Bristol, Bristol
- Denny Abbey, Cambridgeshire
- Temple Church, Bodmin Moor, Temple, Cornwall
- St Michael's Mount, Cornwall
- Temple Sowerby, Cumbria
- Cressing Temple, Essex
- Little Maplestead, Essex
- Garway Church, Herefordshire
- St Mary The Virgin church, Welsh Newton, Herefordshire
- Church of St Mary the Virgin in Baldock, Hertfordshire
- Temple Dinsley, Hertfordshire
- The Manor of Temple Ewell, Kent
- Rothley Temple (Rothley Preceptory), Rothley, Leicestershire
- Eagle Hall Lincolnshire
- South Witham Lincolnshire
- Temple Bruer, Lincolnshire
- The Temple including Temple Church, London
  - Inner Temple
  - Middle Temple
- Temple Mills, Stratford, London
- Temple Cowton, North Yorkshire
- Westerdale Preceptory, North Yorkshire
- Temple Cowley, Oxfordshire
- Templars Square, Oxfordshire
- Cameley and Temple Cloud, Somerset
- Templecombe, Somerset
- Keele, Staffordshire
- Temple Balsall, Warwickshire
- Temple End, Harbury, Warwickshire
- Church of St Mary the Blessed Virgin, Sompting. West Sussex
- St Mary's Church, Shipley, West Sussex
- Temple Newsam, West Yorkshire
- Temple Farm, Rockley, Wiltshire

=== Scotland ===
- Temple, Midlothian
- Castle Rainy and Templars' House, Turriff, Aberdeenshire
- Darvel, East Ayrshire

=== Wales ===
- Llanmadoc Church Gower – gift from the Duchess of Warwick

== Ireland ==
- Templetown, County Wexford
- Clontarf Castle (Templar Preceptory), County Dublin
- Baldongan Church (in-ruins), Skerries, County Dublin
- Ardfinnan Castle (Templar Preceptory), County Tipperary
- Temple House, Ballymote, County Sligo
- Templevalley Church, Mogealy, County Cork, built in 1302

== Germany ==
- Kommende Altmühlmünster (1155–1312)
- Kommende Augsburg (–1312)
- Kommende Bamberg (–1311/12)
- Kommende Braunschweig (1189–1321)
- Kommende Breisig
- Kommende Bollstedt
- Kommende Emmerstedt near Helmstedt
- Kommende Halberstadt
- Kommende Hönningen
- Kommende Hof Iben near Fürfeld
- Kommende Kirchheim an der Weinstraße
- Kommende Lietzen
- Kommende Magdeburg (1262–)
- Kommende Mainz
- Kommende Moritzbrunn (1251–1315)
- Kommende Mücheln near Wettin, Saalekreis
- Kommende Mühlen
- Kommende Nordhausen
- Kommende Oschersleben
- Kommende Roth an der Our
- Kommende Süpplingenburg (1245–1312)
- Kommende Tempelachim near Hornburg, Landkreis Wolfenbüttel
- Kommende Tempelhof (today part of Berlin)
- Kommende Topfstedt
- Kommende Trier (1228–1312)
- Kommende Utterode near Sollstedt, Landkreis Nordhausen
- Kommende Wichmannsdorf near Haldensleben, Landkreis Börde

== Croatia ==
- Cesargrad (Kayersperg)
- Stari grad Ljubač- Castrum Liube (Ljubljana)
- Brckovljani,
- Fortress of Klis,
- Glogovnica
- Gora, Croatia
- Gornji Slatinik
- Hrvatska Dubica,
- Lovčić
- Miholjanec, Zdelja village
- Našice,
- Nova Ves,
- Rassecha – Nova Rača
- Senj,
- Vižinada
- Vrana Fortress,

== Italy ==
See a detailed list at Sedi templari in Italia

- Castello della Magione, Poggibonsi
- San Pietro alla Magione, Siena
- Valvisciolo Abbey, Sermoneta
- Abbey of St. Michael in Montescaglioso
- Templars' Tower at San Felice Circeo (from 1240 to 1259)

== Other countries ==
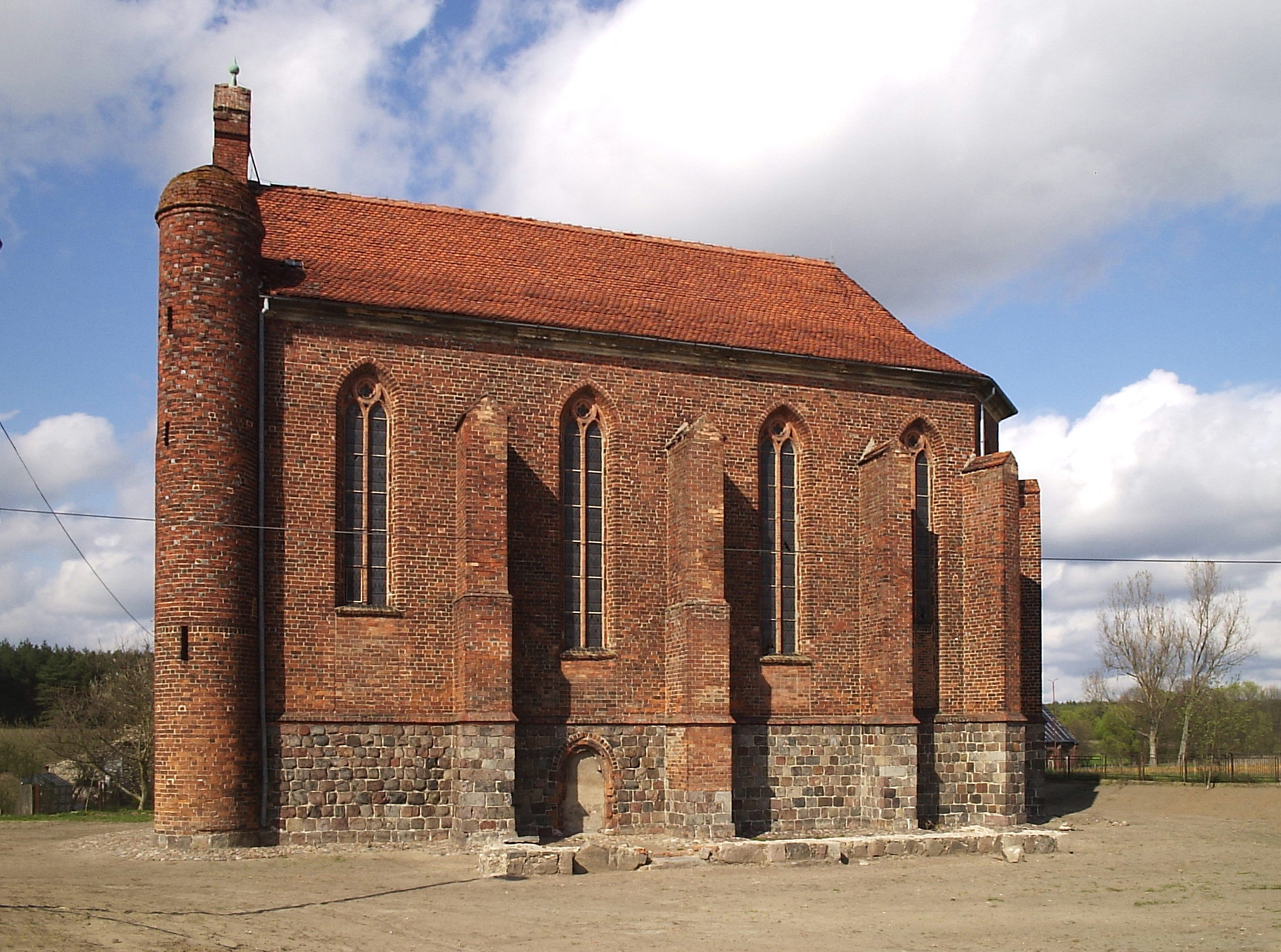
Former Templar chapel at Chwarszczany

- Haneffe, Belgium
- Villers-le-Temple, Belgium
- Templštejn, Czech Republic
- Chwarszczany, Poland
- Grad na Goričkem, Slovenija

== See also ==
- List of Knights Hospitaller sites
- Ordensburg
