= Church of San Miguel el Alto, Toledo =

Medieval building in Toledo, Spain

Coordinates: 39.8567°N 4.0200°W

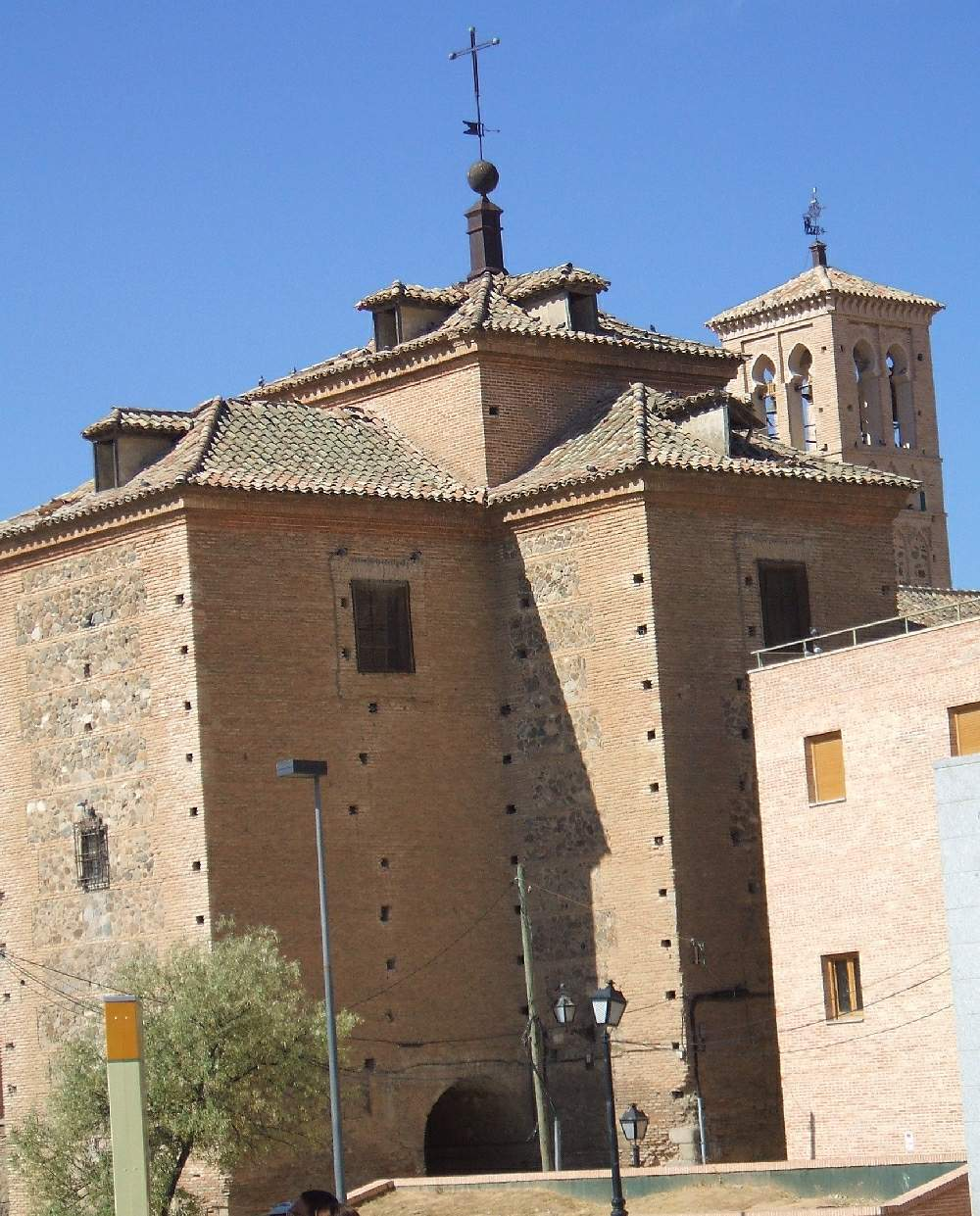
Iglesia de San Miguel el Alto

The Iglesia de San Miguel el Alto is a building of medieval origin located in Toledo (Castile-La Mancha, Spain). Dedicated to St Michael, the church served one of the old Latin parishes of the city, but is now part of the parish of San Justo. It appears that it also had some relation to the Knights Templar who are believed to have had a guest-house in Toledo.

The original 12th-century building was extensively remodelled in the 17th century by Juan Bautista Monegro, but retains some Mudejar features, notably its tower from around the end of the 13th century.

== Conservation ==
The building is protected by the heritage listing Bien de Interes Cultural.

== See also ==
- Catholic Church in Spain
