= Limont Castle =

Castle in Liège Province, Belgium

Coordinates: 50.660278°N 5.310556°E

- Donjon de Limont (French)
- Limont, Liège Province, Wallonia, Belgium

Site information
- Type: Keep

Site history
- Built: c. 1230
- Built by: Robert de Limont

Limont Castle (French: Donjon de Limont) is a 13th-century keep (donjon) in the ancienne commune of Limont, in the municipality of Donceel, Liège Province, Wallonia, Belgium. The keep, which served as the fortified residence for Robert de Limont, the first lord of the area, included a front entry raised to the second level (see image) to provide an extra security precaution in case of attack.

Limont Castle is not directly associated with the Château de Limont, built in the 18th century roughly 850 metres (930 yd) northwest of the fortified tower, on land that was part of the estate.

== See also ==
- List of castles in Belgium
