= Jules de Chestret =

Jean Remy Marie Jules, baron de Chestret de Haneffe (1833—1909) was a Belgian numismatist and bibliophile who was also mayor of Donceel (1879—1885).

== Life ==
Chestret de Haneffe was born in Liège on 4 December 1833, the son of Nicolas Louis Eugène de Chestret de Haneffe, a barrister at the court of appeal in Liège, and Marie Charlotte Albertine Pauline, baroness Moffarts. He was educated in Liège, graduating Candidate of Philosophy from the University of Liège on 24 March 1853. His father wanted him to become a lawyer, but Chestret had no interest in pursuing legal studies.

On 28 October 1857, Chestret married Mathilde Marie Antoinette de Warzée d'Hermalle, daughter of Charles Eugène Joseph, baron de Warzée d'Hermalle and Marie Isabelle Adélaïde de Gomzé. His wife died young, on 11 May 1863, leaving Chestret with three young children.

On 15 March 1863, he was a founding member of the Bibliophiles liégeois, of which he would eventually be president. On 4 July 1869 he was elected a corresponding member of the Société royale de Numismatique, of which he ultimately became honorary president for life on 7 March 1909. From 1882, he was a member of the Institut archéologique liégeois, going on to serve as vice-president and president. On 5 May 1890 he was elected a corresponding member of the Royal Academy of Science, Letters and Fine Arts of Belgium, becoming a full member on 8 May 1893.

He died in Liège on 10 September 1909 and was buried in the family vault at Donceel.

== Publications ==
- Histoire de la seigneurie impériale de Reckheim (1873)
