= Commandery of Libdeau =

Former Knights Templar commandery in Lorraine, in France

- Commanderie de Libdeau
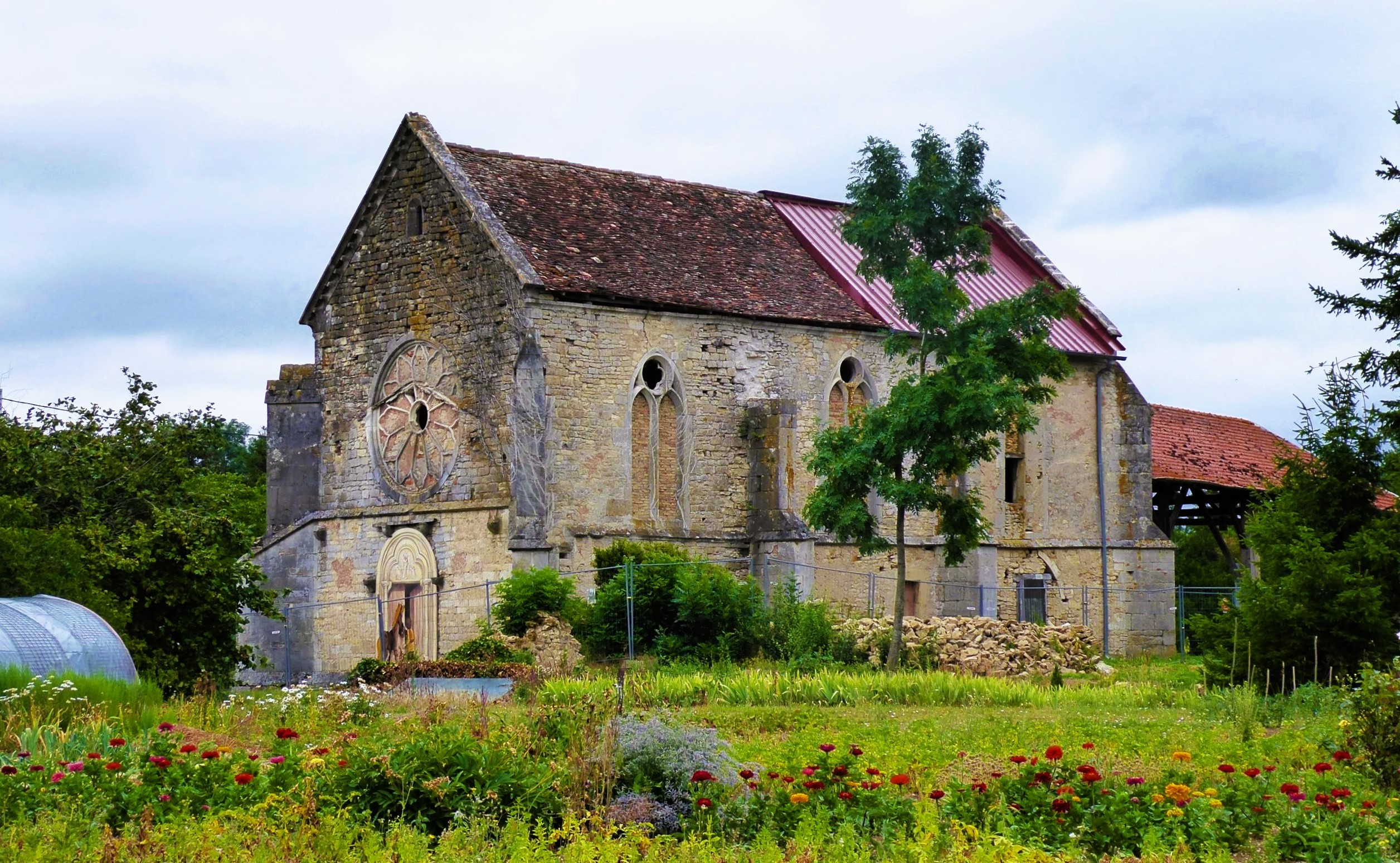
- Chapel of the commandery of Libdeau

- Location within France
- Etymology: liberum donum (Latin : free gift)

General information
- Architectural style: Commandery, a medieval monastery of the Knights Hospitaller
- Classification: Registered as Monument historique
- Location: Toul, France
- Coordinates: 48.713741°N 5.919718°E
- Construction started: 12th century

Website
- https://www.libdeau.fr/

The Commandery of Libdeau is a former Knights Templar commandery, founded before 1190. It is at Toul, in Lorraine, in the present Grand Est region of France.

== History ==
It became a Knights Hospitaller commandery following the dissolution of the Order of the Temple in 1312 by Pope Clement V at the Council of Vienne.

During the French Revolution, it was nationalized by the state and sold as a bien national in July 1794.

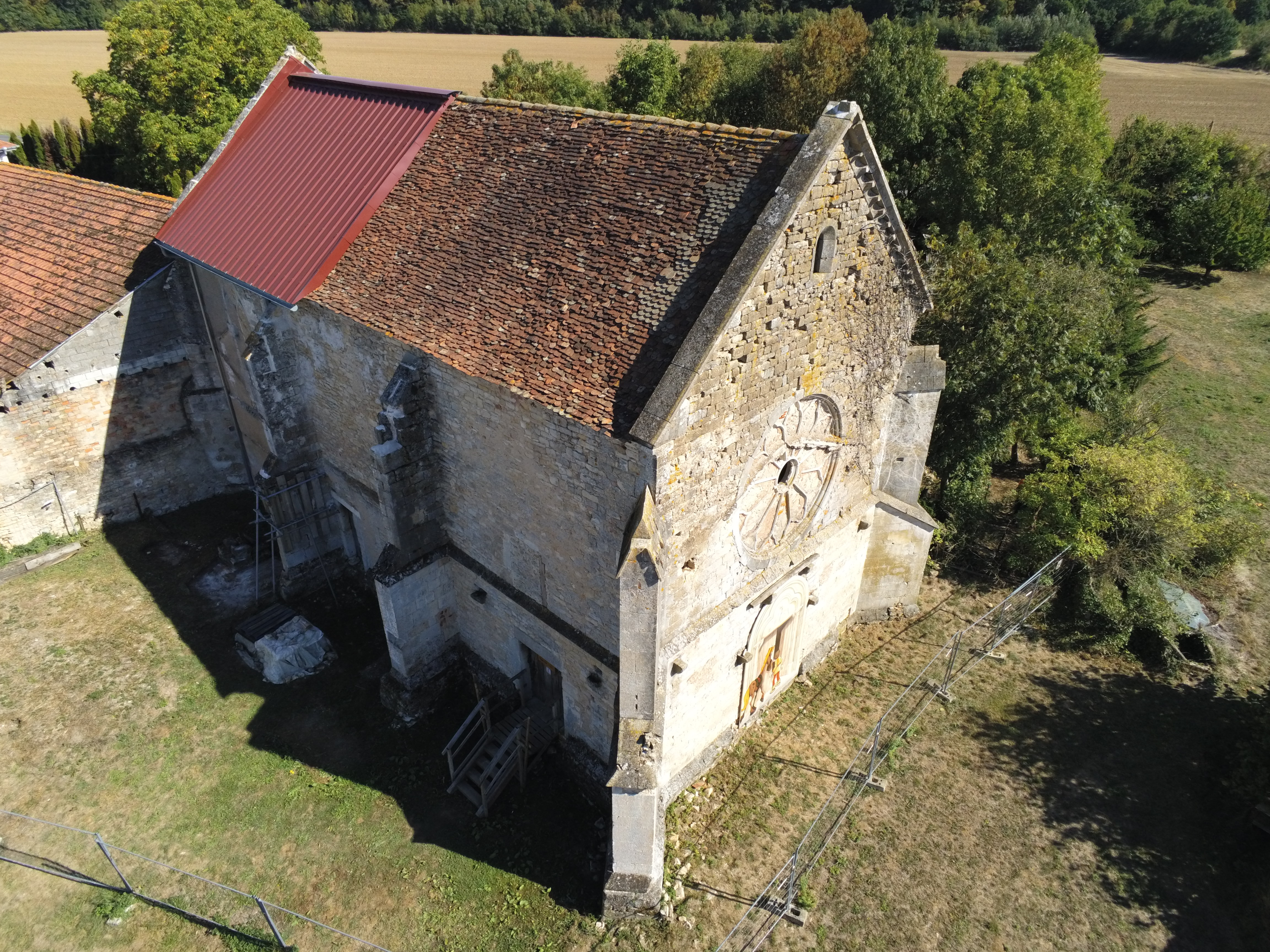
General view of Libdeau

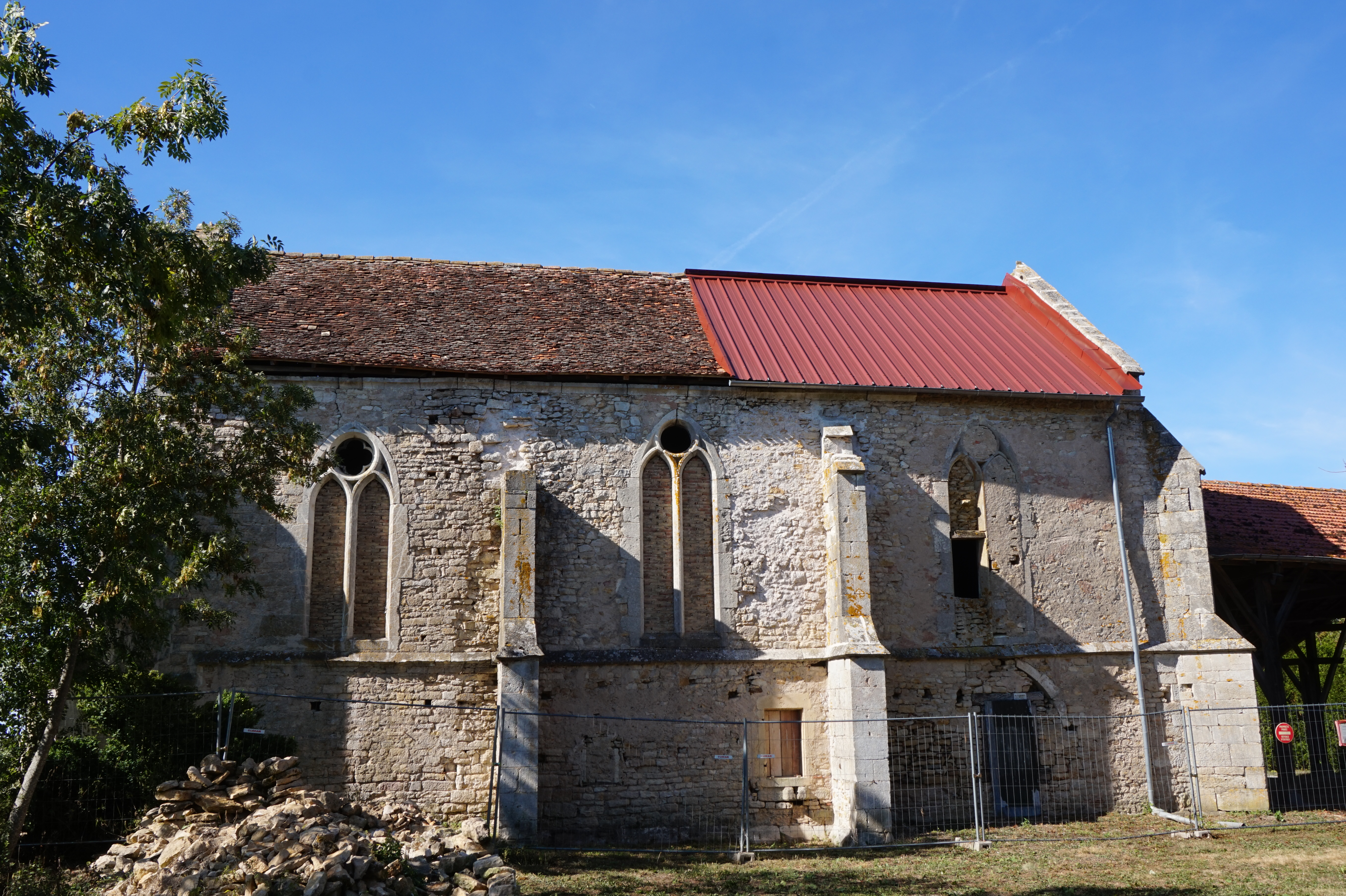
Side view of the chapel

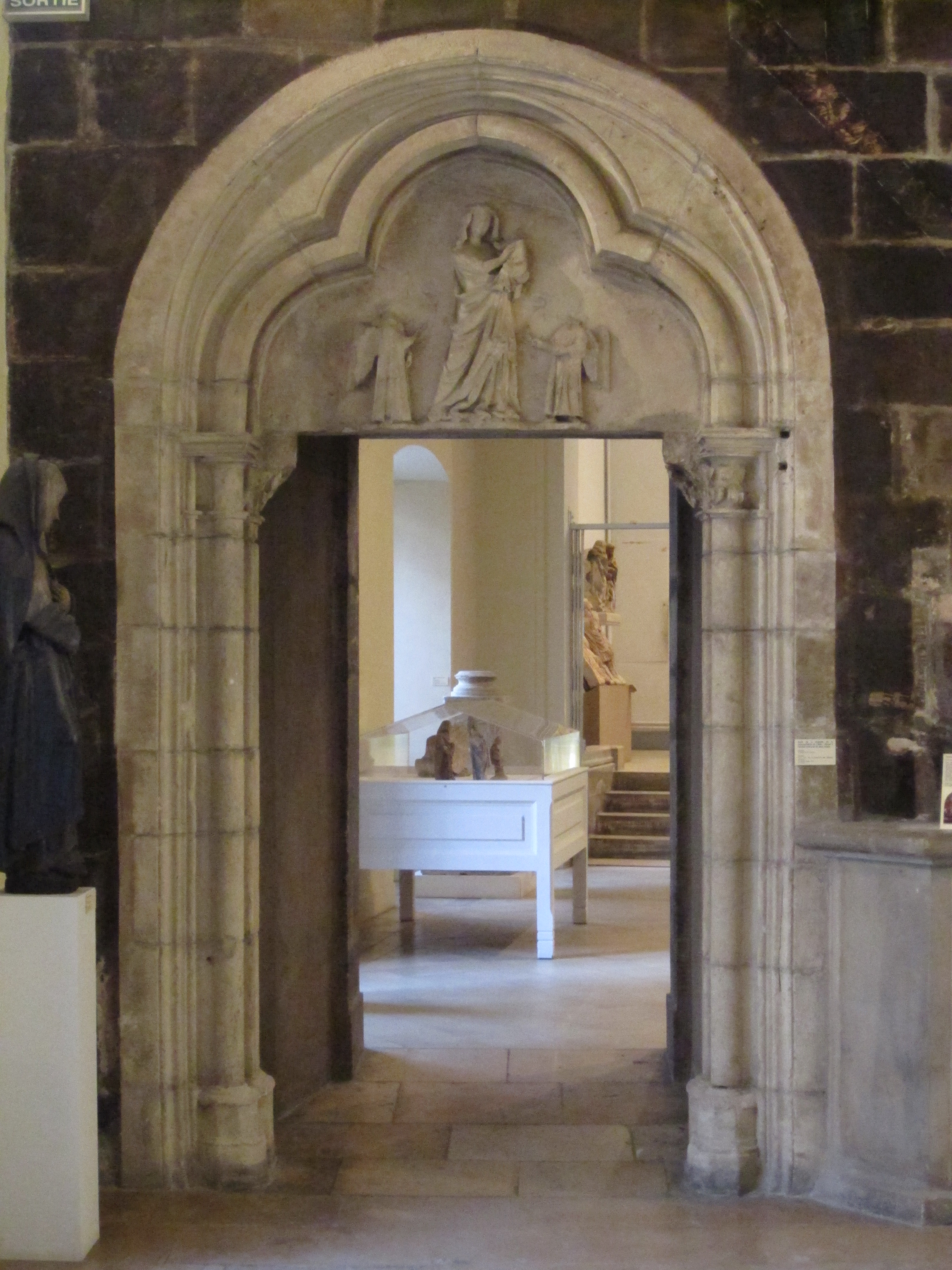
Carved portal of Libdeau

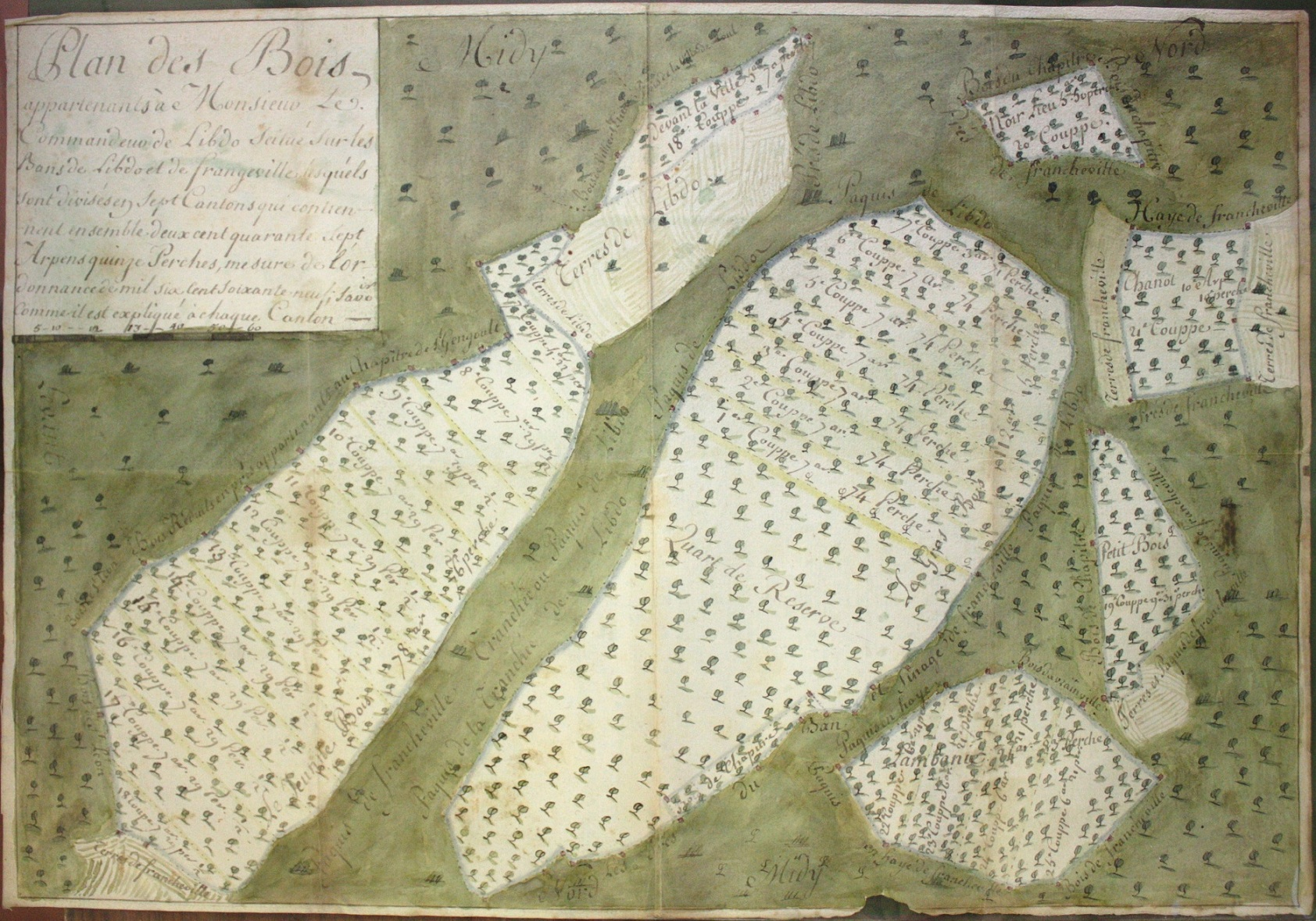
Estate of Libdeau (land terrier)

== Buildings ==
The only remaining buildings of the commandery of Libdeau are the gothic chapel, at Libdeau dating from the first quarter of the 13th century, and a 17th-century townhouse situated in the city of Toul.

The gothic portal of the chapel and several ledger stones coming from Libdeau have been kept since the 1960s at the Palace of the Dukes of Lorraine, home of the Musée Lorrain in Nancy.

The other buildings of the commandery were rebuilt after the Thirty Years' War and are now used for housing and farming.

== Protection ==
The chapel and its plot of land have been registered as French national heritage since 1995.

An association has launched a rescue and renovation scheme since 2011, with the support, among many other members and contributors, of the French heritage foundations La Sauvegarde de l'Art français and Fondation du Patrimoine.

== Literature ==
- Michel Henry, Les ordres militaires en Lorraine, Éditions Serpenoise, 2006, 354 p. (ISBN 978-2-8769-2706-3).
- Pierre Simonin, « Quatre chapelles du Temple en Lorraine », Le Pays Lorrain, vol. 73, n° 1, 1992, p. 15-25.
- Pierre Simonin, « L'ancienne chapelle des Templiers de Libdeau », Études Touloises, vol. 61, 1992, p. 21-25.
- Henri Lepage, « Notice sur quelques établissements de l'ordre de Saint-Jean de Jérusalem situés en Lorraine : IX. Commanderie de Libdeau et de Toul », Annuaire administratif, statistique, historique et commercial de la Meurthe, 1853, p. 61-64.

== See also ==
- Knights Hospitaller
