= List of protected heritage sites in Donceel =

This table shows an overview of the protected heritage sites in the Walloon town Donceel. This list is part of Belgium's national heritage.

Object	Year/architect	Town/section	Address	Coordinates	Number^{?}	Image
Roman tower of church Saints-Cyr-et-Julitte ^{(nl)} ^{(fr)}		Donceel		50.647763°N 5.321302°E	64023-CLT-0001-01	Kerk Saints-Cyr-et-Julitte: romaanse toren
windmill ^{(nl)} ^{(fr)}		Donceel	rue du Moulin, à côté du n°65	50.653898°N 5.326800°E	64023-CLT-0002-01	
Degive farmhouse ^{(nl)} ^{(fr)}		Donceel	rue Ribatte, n°236	50.637092°N 5.317048°E	64023-CLT-0003-01	Boerderij Degive
Chapel 'Du Temple' ^{(nl)} ^{(fr)}		Donceel	rue des Templiers	50.639770°N 5.318043°E	64023-CLT-0004-01	Kapel ('Chapelle du Temple')
church of St. Pierre ^{(nl)} ^{(fr)}		Donceel		50.639063°N 5.318198°E	64023-CLT-0005-01	Kerk Saint-Pierre: toren, koor en twee grafstenen
Organs of church St. Pierre ^{(nl)} ^{(fr)}		Donceel		50.639049°N 5.318057°E	64023-CLT-0006-01	
Castle (keep) ^{(nl)} ^{(fr)}		Donceel	rue de l'Eglise, n°28	50.660266°N 5.310450°E	64023-CLT-0008-01	Donjon

== See also ==
- List of protected heritage sites in Liège (province)
- Donceel
