= Iglesia de los Santos Justo y Pastor, Toledo =

Church in Toledo

Coordinates: 39.8561°N 4.0215°W

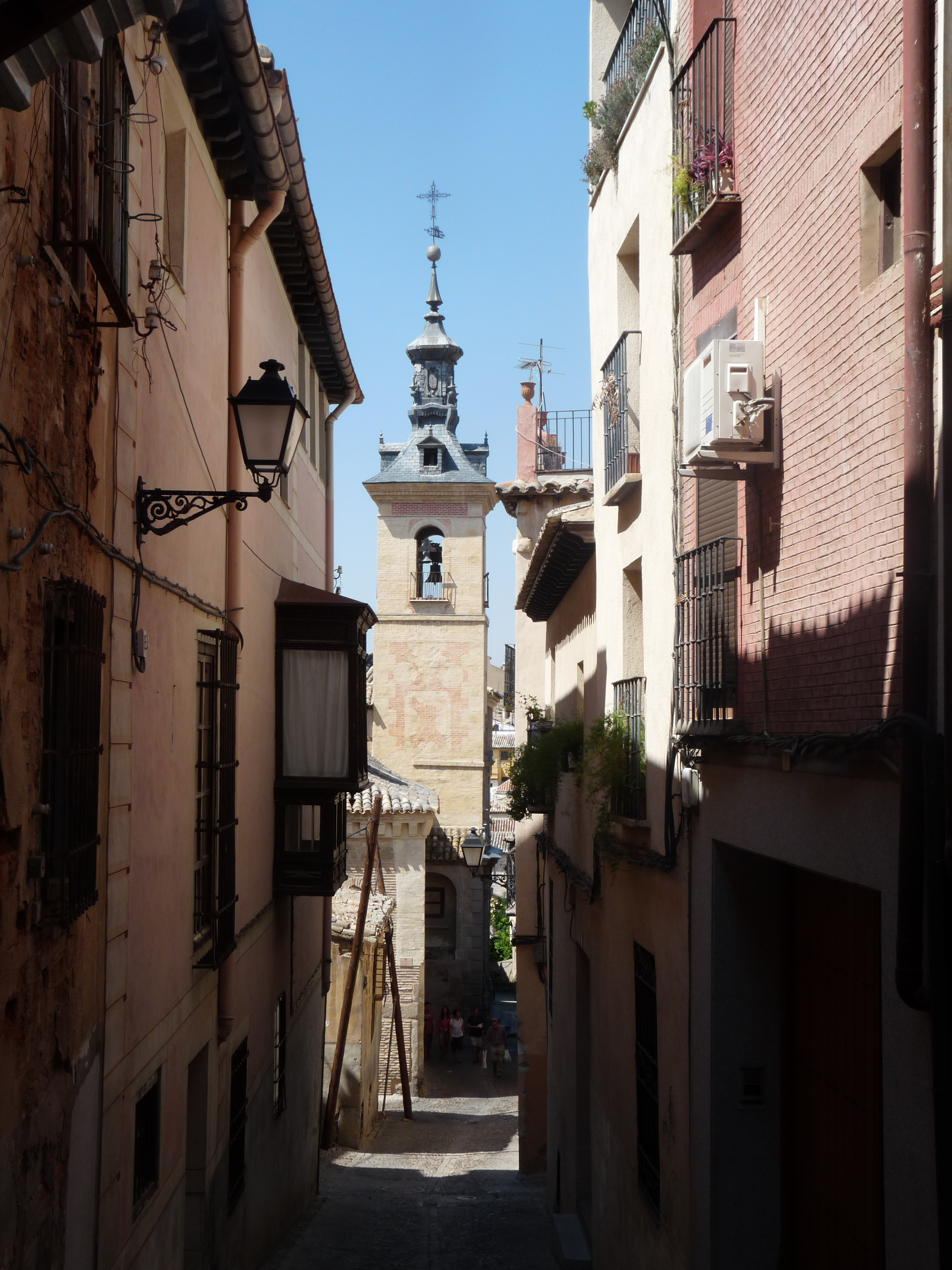
Iglesia de los santos Justo y Pastor

The Iglesia de los Santos Justo y Pastor, popularly known as Iglesia de San Justo, is a church located in the city of Toledo (Castile-La Mancha, Spain). It was founded after the city was taken by King Alfonso VI of León and Castile in the 13th century. The city underwent transformations between the 14th and 18th centuries. This is a religious temple under the invocation of the holy children Justus and Pastor.

== History ==
Throughout the 14th century, the church underwent multiple rounds of reconstruction. Included was the preservation of the chapel of Corpus Christi (next to the Main chapel), which is constructed of a rectangular stay, a cover of wood and rich decoration in azulejos. The remains of the Mudéjar apse, built in brick and with the decoration of blind arches, are also considered to be part of the reconstruction done in the 14th century. However, they may correspond to earlier work, as indicated from their external rig configuration.

In the 15th and 16th centuries, three chapels with ribbed vaults were added, which open to the nave of the epistle. One of them, dedicated to the Virgen de la Esperanza, includes a remarkable Plateresque fence.

In the 17th century, the temple was again altered, with the central nave losing its previous Mudéjar character. According to traces and conditions noted by Juan Bautista Monegro, the brick octo-sided pillars that delineated the central nave of the previous church were replaced in 1612 with two pillars, each with a pair of identical attached half-columns and composed of granite from the Las Ventas con Peña Aguilera's quarries.

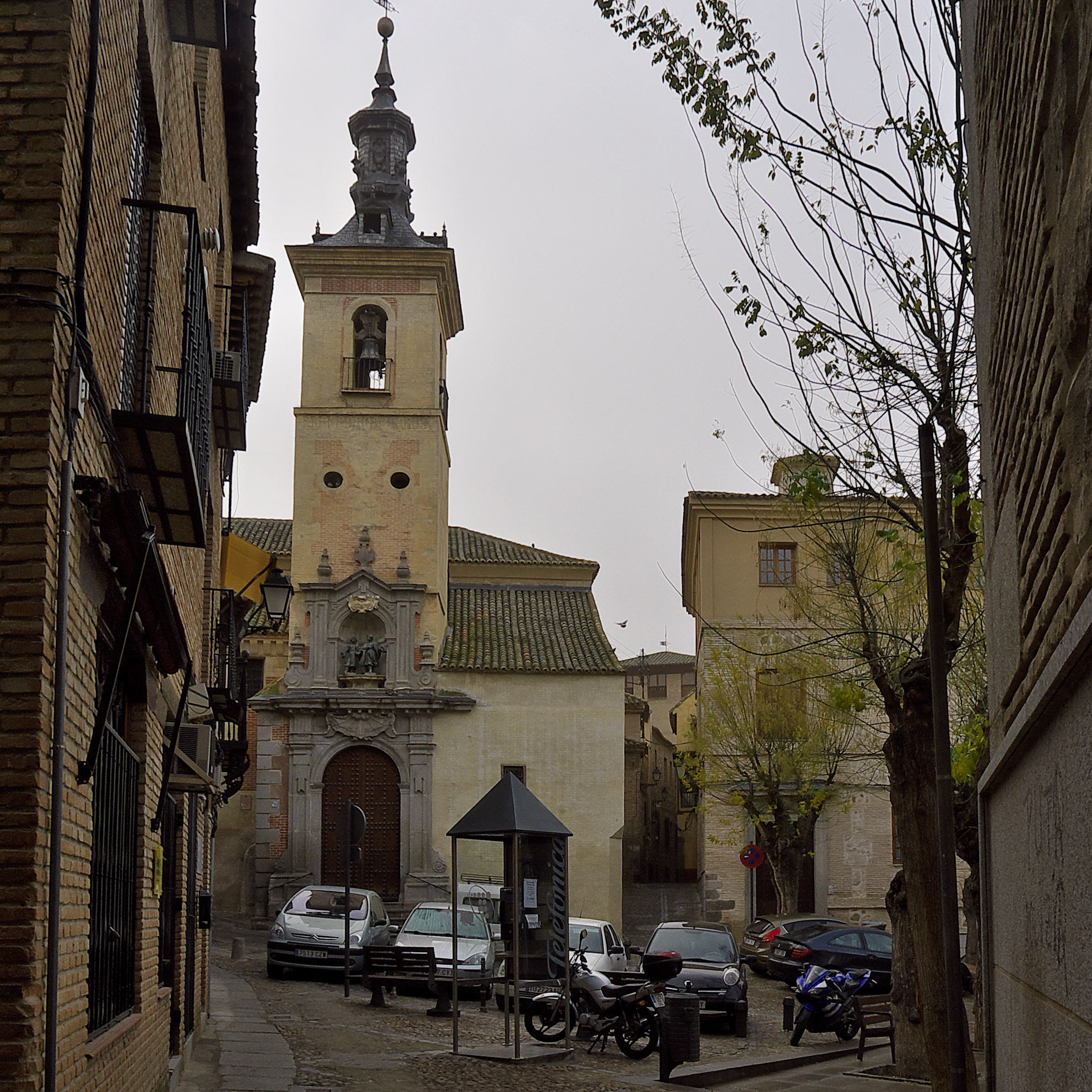
Facade

During the 18th century, the transformation of the temple was completed through plastering, pictorial decoration of the interior elevations, execution of the lateral naves' ceilings and finalization of the exterior. The unique entryway is posed as a tower-portal, something unusual in Toledan architecture. The portal is thus placed in the lower part of the temple tower, which stands out from the temple's main floor. The portal (altarpiece type) is raised in a body, which entails effective access between pilasters and a penthouse with niche, arranged to house the titular saints' sculptures. The exterior elevations, except for the Mudéjar apse, have a reddish plaster, under which is seen, in some parts, another imitation plaster of brick.
