= Cedric Norman Johns =

Welsh archeologist (1904–1992)

Cedric Norman Johns or C.N. Johns (14 October 1904 – 1992) was a Welsh archeologist primarily known for his excavation work on the sites of Château Pèlerin, Ajlun, and Euhesperides. Johns was one of the last Field Archeologists for the Department of Antiquities of Palestine under the British Mandate.

== Career ==
Johns graduated from Emmanuel College in Cambridge. He then moved to Jerusalem to teach at St. George's School. Johns first became involved with archeology as a hobby. In 1928, he left teaching to become a librarian at the British School of Archeology at Jerusalem. In 1930, Johns was appointed Field Archeologist for the Department of Antiquities of Palestine by Ernest Richmond, a position he would serve in until the dissolution of Mandatory Palestine in 1948. While serving as a Field Archeologist, Johns conducted some of his most notable excavations. Johns focused much of his work on monumental archeology.

Shortly after the dissolution of Mandatory Palestine, Johns became the Controller of Antiquities in the recently created state of Libya under British Military Administration. While in Libya, Johns led the excavation of the Greek city of Euhesperides for two seasons. The dig was a collaboration between the Antiquities Service and the Ashmolean Museum.

In 1954, Johns left the Middle East and returned to Wales where he served as Principal Investigator for the Royal Commission on the Ancient and Historical Monuments of Wales. While serving in this position, Johns investigated several Welsh castles including Caernarvon, Caerphilly, and Bishop's Castle.

In 1969, Johns received the G.T. Clark Memorial Prize and retired from archeology.

== Legacy ==
After Johns's death in 1992, his archives were donated to the Palestine Exploration Fund by his son, Adam.
