= Le Destroit =

Coordinates: 32°42′28″N 34°56′46″E

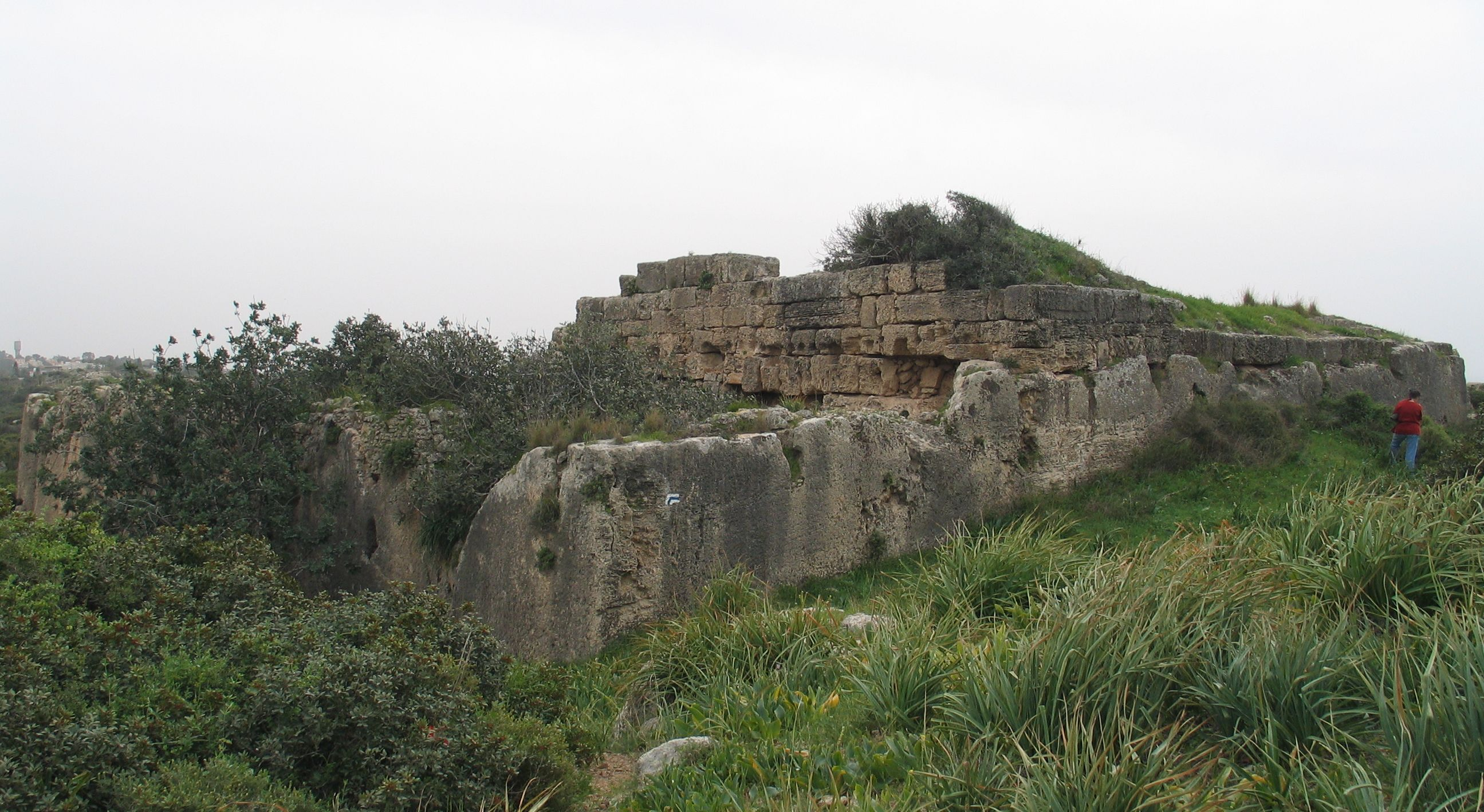
Le Destroit fortress

Le Destroit (for alternative names see below) is a ruined medieval fortified road station, built by the Templars of the Crusader Kingdom of Jerusalem in the early 12th century CE, located on the Mediterranean shore near a site where they later built the Chateau Pelerin castle, today close to the modern town of Atlit, Israel.

== Names and etymology ==
The Frankish name of the fort was Casel Destreiz and le Destroit, with the Latin variants Destrictum and Petra Incisa. The Arabic name of the site is Khirbat Dustray (alternative spelling Khirbet Dustrey). The Hebrew name is Horvat Qarta.

The Frankish name is derived from Latin (districtus and distringere, consisting of the preposition de and the verb stringere, to tighten) via the Gallo-Romance languages, which retained the meaning of 'narrow' and 'restricted' referring to a connecting way or passage, which resulted in the meaning of 'strait'.

== History ==
The coastal road near Atlit ran through a narrow passage in the rock, making it an ideal location for robbers to ambush pilgrims and other travelers. In 1103, Baldwin I of Jerusalem was wounded by robbers in the area. The tower fortress, which was situated on a ridge above the pass on the east side of the peninsula at Atlit, was built to protect these travelers.

The army led by King Richard I of England camped at the fortress following the recapture of Acre in 1191. However, when the larger Castrum Perigrinorum was completed in 1218, Le Destroit was dismantled by the Crusaders so that it couldn't be used by the Muslim enemy as a staging ground for an attack on the main castle. Denys Pringle indicates 1220 as the year Destroit was destroyed.

== Current condition ==
Today the podium-shaped tower base with rock-cut cisterns, the rock-cut yard containing the stables, as well as the moat can still be seen. The remains are cut into the living rock, an aeolian quartz sandstone known in the region as kurkar.

== See also ==
- Archaeology of Israel
- List of Knights Templar sites
