= Limont =

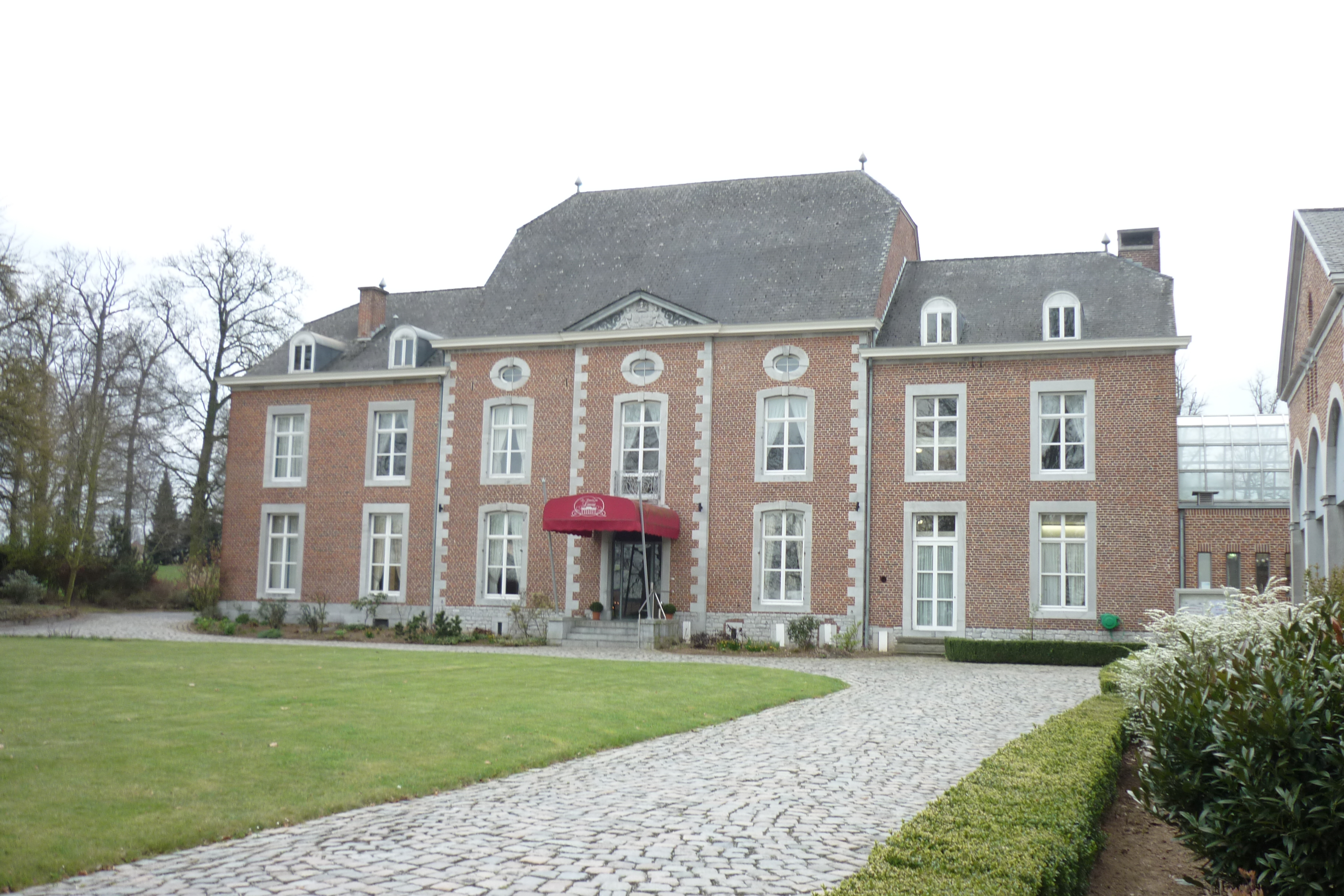
- Limont, the château

- Location within Belgium Location within Europe
- Coordinates: 50°39′41″N 05°18′42″E
- Country: Belgium
- Region: Wallonia
- Province: Liège
- Municipality: Donceel

Limont (French pronunciation: [limɔ̃]) is a village and district of the municipality of Donceel, located in the province of Liège in Wallonia, Belgium.

The village has existed at least since the Middle Ages. A still extant keep, a fortified tower also known as Limont Castle, was erected in the village in the 13th century. A small château, built in the late 18th century and enlarged in the early 19th century, lies close to the centre of the village, surrounded by a park.
