= Chastel Hernault =

Fortress in the Holy land

Chastel Hernault was a Crusader castle at Yalu on the road from Jaffa to Jerusalem, in the Kingdom of Jerusalem. A castle on the site, dismantled by the Fatimids in 1106, was rebuilt in 1132/33. By 1179 it was held by the Knights Templar, and it fell to Saladin in 1187.

== Location ==
The castle stood on one of the roads to Jerusalem shortly before it enters the Judaean Mountains, about one kilometre south-west of Beit Nuba and north of the Ayalon Valley.

== History ==
A castle at the site was dismantled by the Fatimids in 1106. It was rebuilt in 1132/33 by the Latin Patriarch of Jerusalem and the citizens of the city. Runciman gives the Patriarch as William of Messines and says the work began in 1133, while King Fulk was away in the north. The Patriarch organised a campaign against the bandits who were troubling the road and built the castle near Beit Nuba where the road from Lod climbs into the hills. According to Runciman this made the road easier for police and that travelers on the Jaffa-Jerusalem road seldom met with trouble.

== Templar period ==
By 1179 the castle was in Templar hands. Boas lists it with the Templar towers on the road to Jerusalem, alongside Casel des Pleins (Yazur) and Toron des Chevaliers (Latrun).

== Fall ==
The castle fell to Saladin in 1187.

== See also ==
- List of Knights Templar sites
- Yalo
