= Château Pèlerin =

Crusader fortress and fortified town in the Land of Israel

Coordinates: 32°42′19″N 34°56′02″E

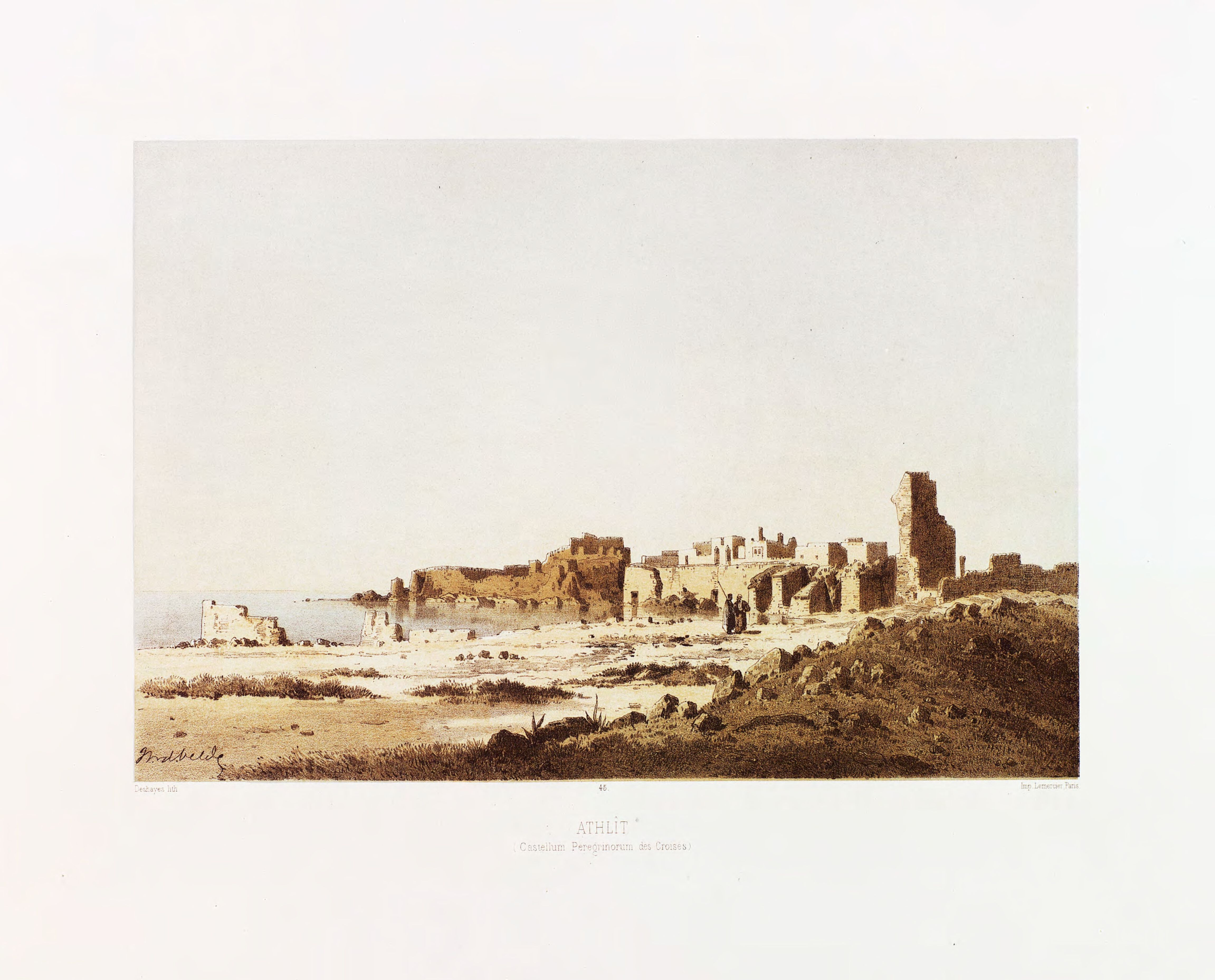
1850s sketch showing the town within the fortifications.

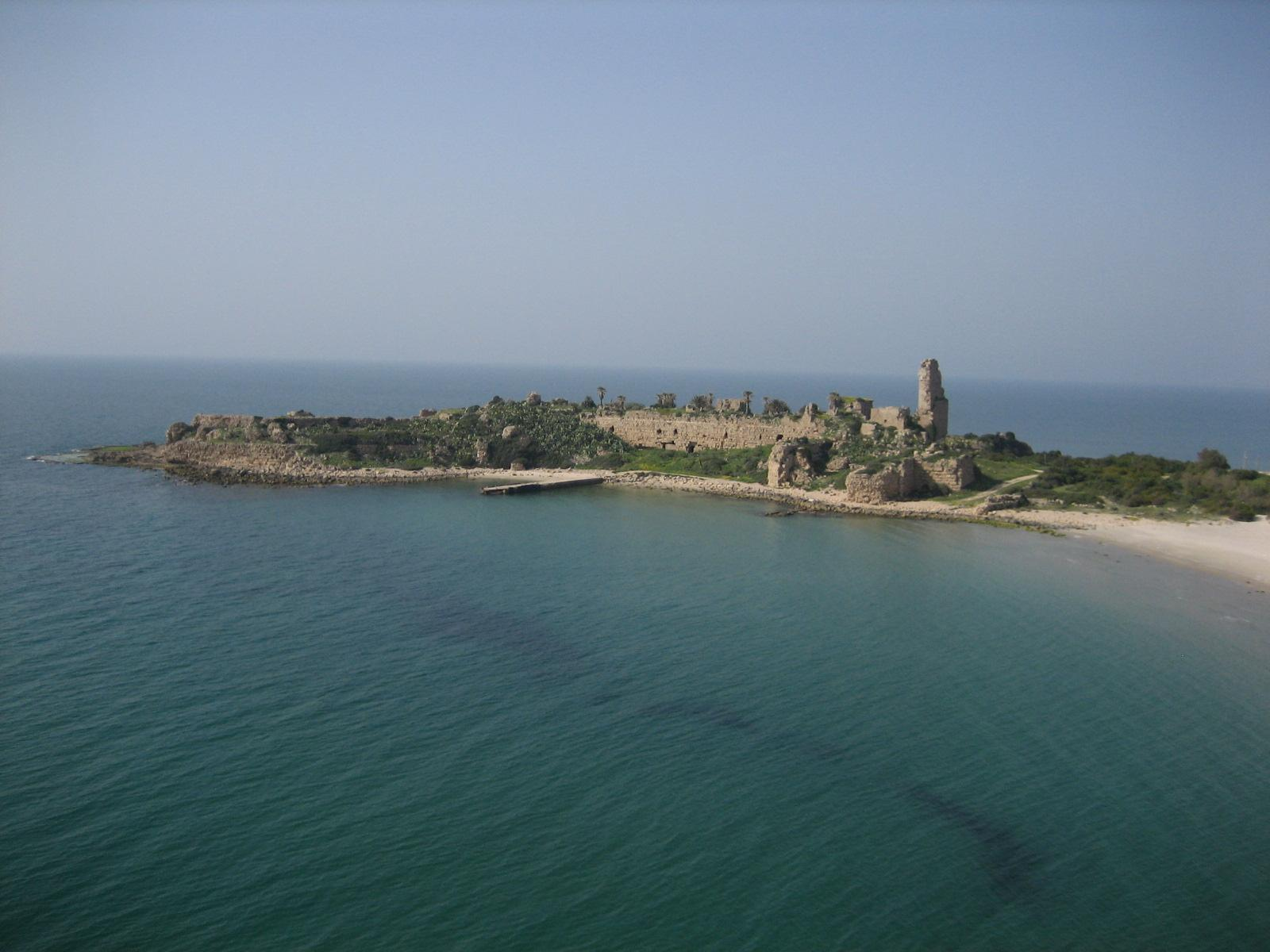
The site in modern times

Château Pèlerin (Old French: Chastel Pelerin; Latin: Castrum Perigrinorum, lit. 'Pilgrim Castle'), also known as Atlit and Magdiel, is a Crusader fortress and fortified town

located about 2 kilometres (1.2 mi) north of the modern Israeli town of Atlit on the northern coast of Israel, about 13 kilometres (8.1 mi) south of Haifa. Château Pèlerin is located inside the Atlit naval base.

The Knights Templar began building the fortress in 1218 during the Fifth Crusade. One of the major Crusader fortresses, it could support up to 4,000 troops in siege conditions. It became for a short time the headquarters of the Crusaders; according to Claude Reignier Conder its architecture "must have made ‘Athlit perhaps the finest town of the period in the country". It has been described as the "crowning example of Crusader military architecture", although T. E. Lawrence found it lacking in elegance and imagination in terms of military architecture, settling on massiveness instead. In early August 1291, three months after the Siege of Acre, the forces of Al-Ashraf Khalil conquered Atlit, which was at that point the last remaining Crusader outpost in Syria, thus permanently ending Crusader presence in the region.

The fortress remained intact for several hundred years, until suffering damage in the Galilee earthquake of 1837. In the 14th century, it became home to a large concentration of Oirat Mongols. During early Ottoman rule, in the 16th century, it was recorded in tax registers as a port of call and a farm. Later, in the 19th century, it was a small fishing village under the influence of the local al-Madi family.

It seems that the Arab inhabitants left in 1948. In modern times, the castle is part of the Atlit naval base, a training zone for Israeli Naval commandos.

== History ==
=== Roman period ===
In the Bordeaux Itinerary, the town is known in Latin as Certa.

=== Crusader period ===
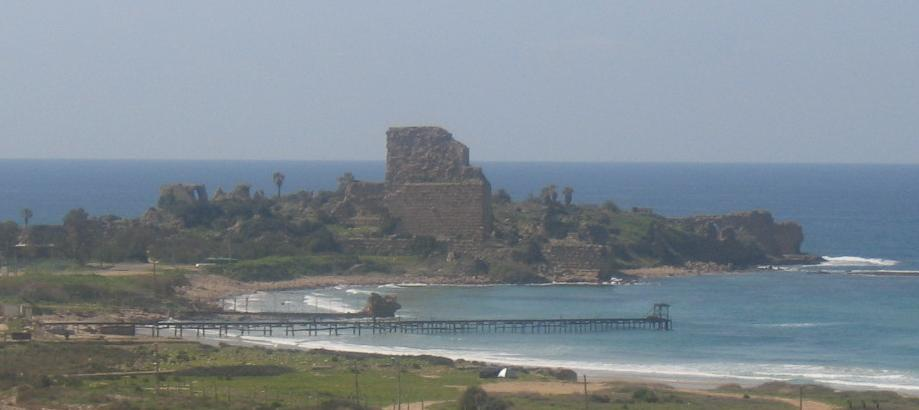
Westward view of Atlit Fortress

Construction began in early spring 1218 during the period of the Fifth Crusade by the Knights Templar, replacing the earlier castle of Le Destroit which was situated slightly back from the coast. The castle was built on a promontory, with two main walls cutting the citadel off from the land. The outer wall was approximately 15 metres high and 6 metres thick, with three square towers situated about 44 metres apart, projecting out by 12 metres with a level platform on the roof probably for artillery. In front ran a shallow ditch dug at sea level cut into the bedrock. The inner wall was approximately 30 metres high by 12 metres, with two square towers, the north and south each approximately 34 metres tall. As the inner wall was taller than the outer wall, defenders were able to shoot at targets over the first wall allowing greater protection from return fire by the besiegers. Part of the design of the castle included a protected harbour on the south side of the promontory. It also had three fresh water wells within its enclosure. The castle was capable of supporting up to 4000 troops during a siege, as it did in 1220. The settlement of Atlit developed outside the castle's outer wall and was later fortified. The castle's position dominated the north–south coastal route, and surrounding countryside allowing it to draw revenue from tolls and rents, going some way to pay for the running costs of the castle; as well as providing protection for pilgrims. The castle probably got its name from pilgrims who volunteered their labour during its construction. There is a large Crusader cemetery (80 x 100 metres) north of the castle, on the beach, containing hundreds of graves, some with carved grave markers.

The castle was under the control of the Knights Templar and was never taken in siege due to its excellent location and design and its ability to be resupplied by sea. It was besieged in 1220 by the Ayyubids, under the command of al-Malik al-Mu'azzam. It came under siege by the Mamluks under Sultan Baybars in 1265, during which the settlement of 'Atlit was destroyed. With the fall of Acre and collapse of the Kingdom of Jerusalem by the Mamluks under Sultan al-Ashraf Khalil, the Knights Templar lost their main roles of defence of the Holy land and security of pilgrims to the Holy Sites. The castle could now only be resupplied by sea, so the castle was evacuated between 3 and 14 August 1291.

=== Mamluk period ===
The castle was not demolished by the Mamluks as was their normal practice after capturing a crusader fortification and remained in good condition until it suffered severe damage during the Galilee earthquake of 1837, and was also further damaged by Ibrahim Pasha in 1840, who used it as a source of stone for Acre.

Atlit
- Village
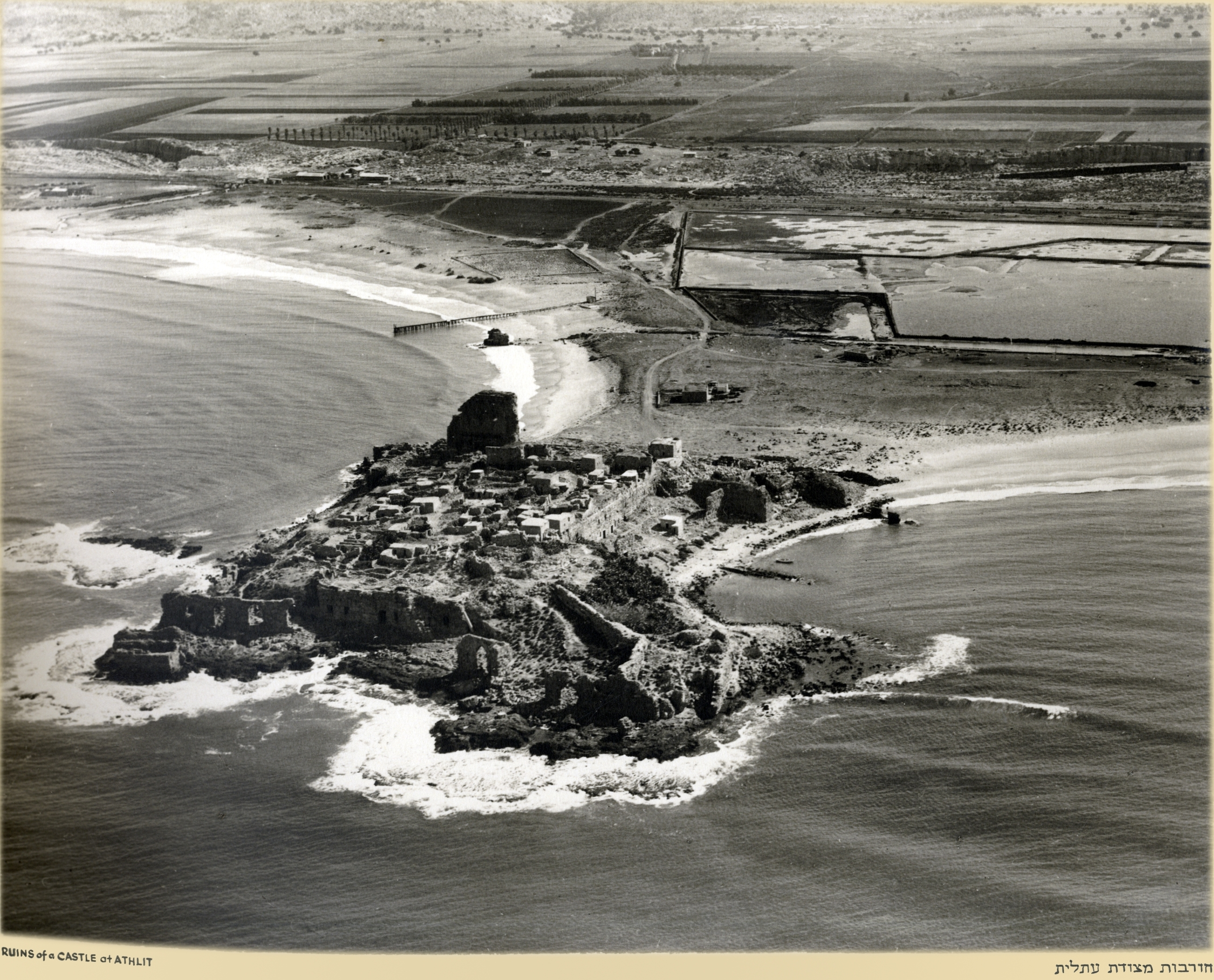
- The village of Atlit in 1937

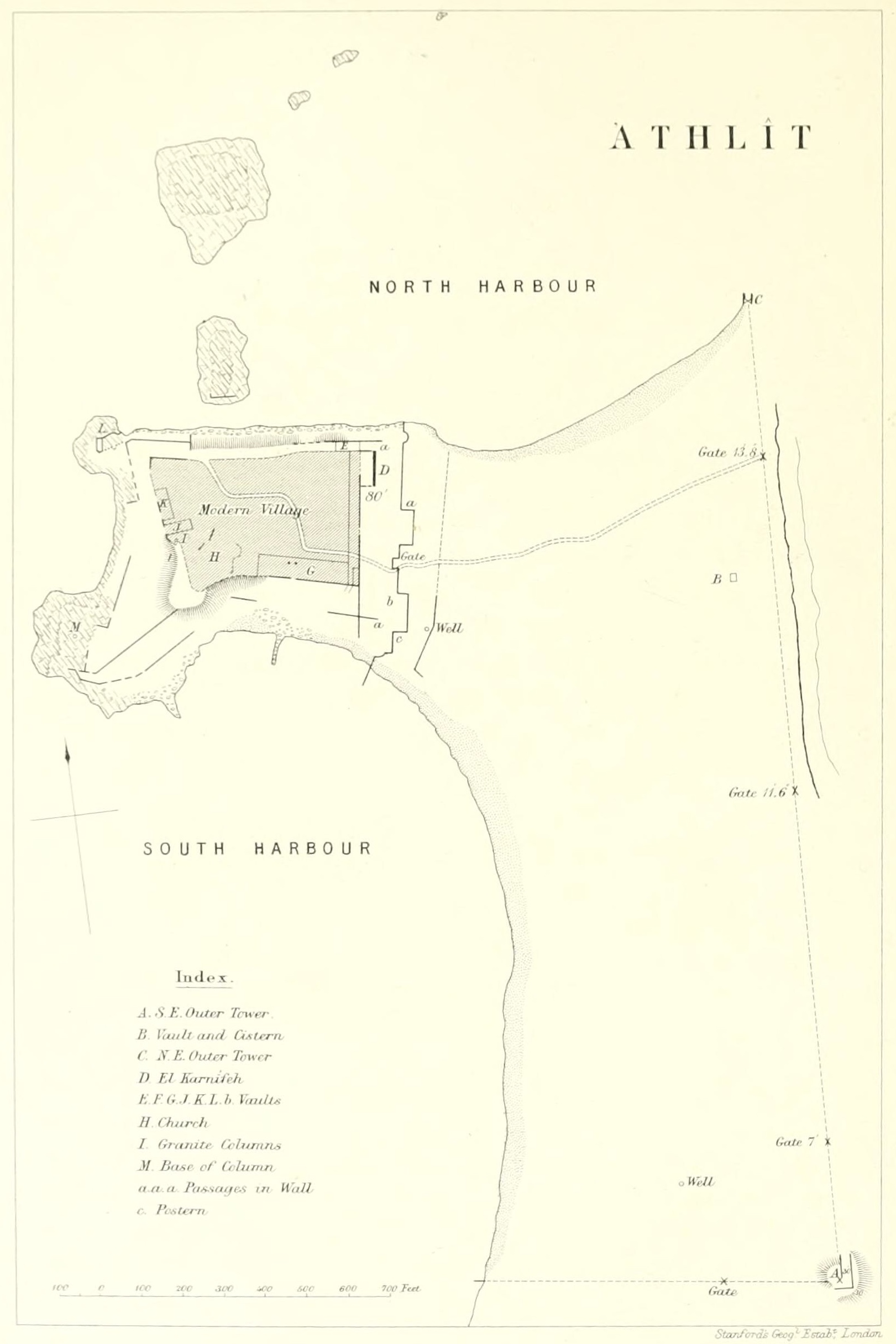
- Map showing the "modern village" of Atlit, within the fortress walls, from the 1871-77 PEF Survey of Palestine
- Palestine grid: 144/233
- Geopolitical entity: Mandatory Palestine
- Subdistrict: Haifa
- Date of depopulation: Not known

In 1296, during the beginnings of Mamluk rule in the coastlands of Palestine, 10,000 to 18,000 Oirat Mongols entered the Mamluk realm as part of a defecting Ilkhanid troop, followed by smaller waves of arrivals. Although they originally established themselves in Cairo, most were eventually relocated to Atlit and northwestern Syria by the Mamluks.

=== Ottoman period ===
The iskele (port of call or wharf) of Atlit, along with those of nearby Tantura and Tirat Lawza generated annual revenues of 5,000 akces in 1538, during Ottoman rule (1517–1917). In 1596 Atlit was recorded as a farm that paid taxes to the government.

In 1799, it appeared as the village Atlit on the map that Pierre Jacotin compiled that year.

During the rule of Acre governor Sulayman Pasha al-Adil (1805–1819), Atlit was the headquarters of local strongman Mas'ud al-Madi, who was appointed the mutasallim (tax collector/enforcer) of the Atlit coast, which consisted of the territory that stretched from Umm Khalid to Haifa. In 1859, the population was stated to be "200 souls", and their tillage 20 feddans, according to the English consul Rogers.

An Ottoman village list of about 1870 showed that Atlit had 9 houses and a population of 33, though the population count included men only. In 1881, the PEF's Survey of Western Palestine noted the existence of an hamlet covering a good portion of the ancient site. A population list from about 1887 showed that Atlit had about 180 inhabitants; all Muslims.

=== British Mandate Period ===
The population declined in the early 20th century; the 1922 census of Palestine recorded a population of 86 people.

A major excavation sponsored by Mandate Authorities was undertaken by C. N. Johns between 1930 and 1934.

The castle was part of the area used by the Mandate Authorities to house illegal refugees during the later Mandate period.

=== State of Israel ===
The castle is now part of Atlit naval base, an Israeli Navy base which is the headquarters of the Israeli Navy's Shayetet 13 naval commando unit. As a result, the castle is within a closed military zone and training area for naval commandos.

== Gallery ==
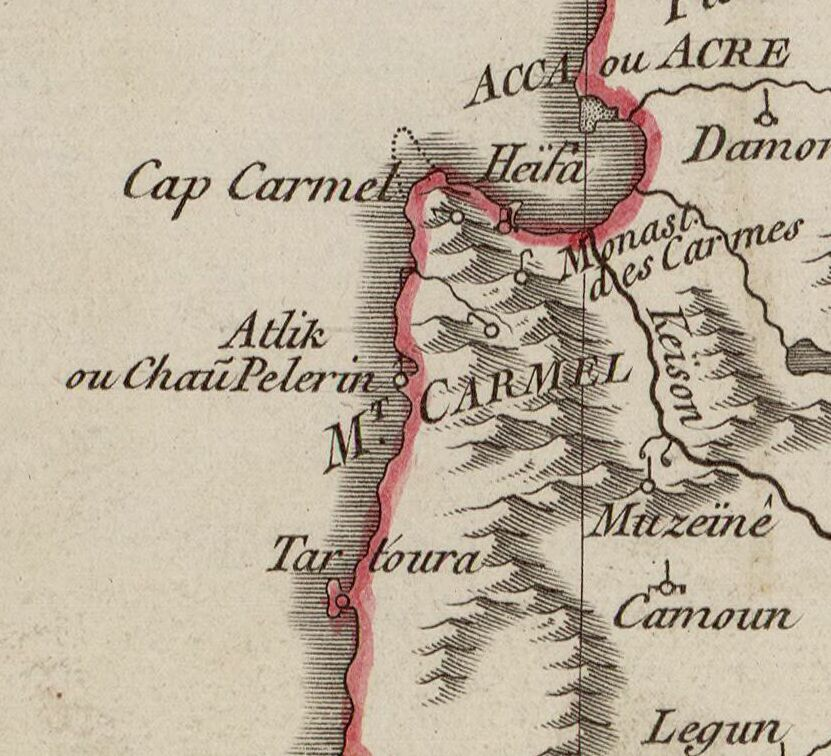
1752 map

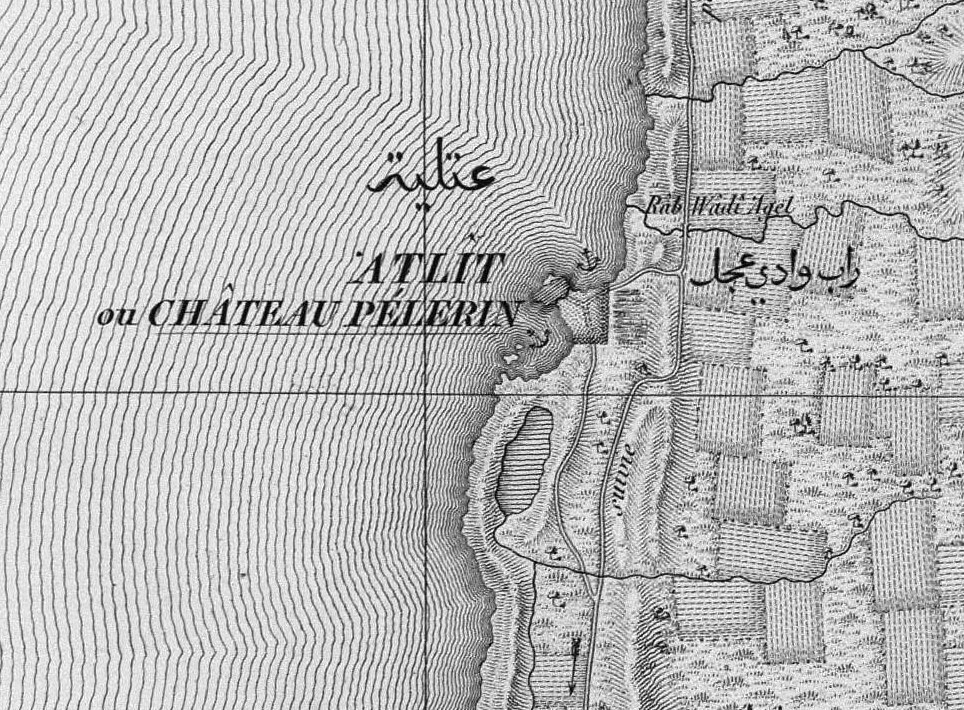
1800 map

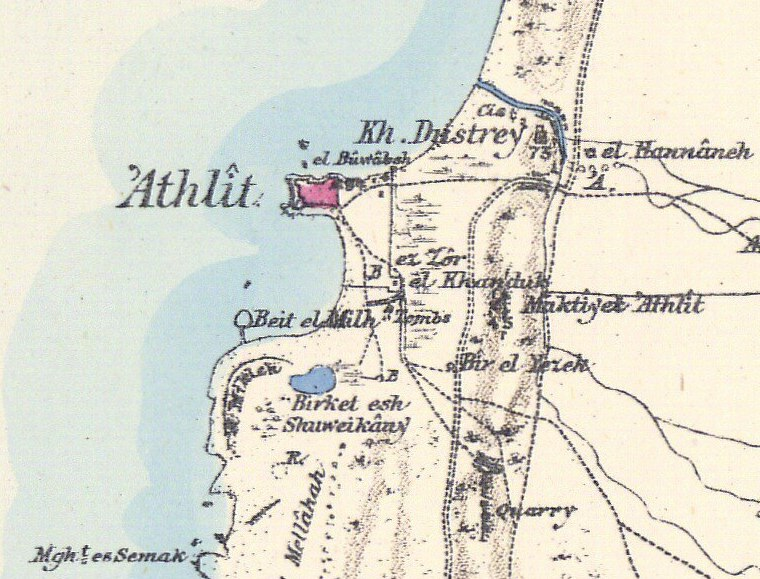
1880 map

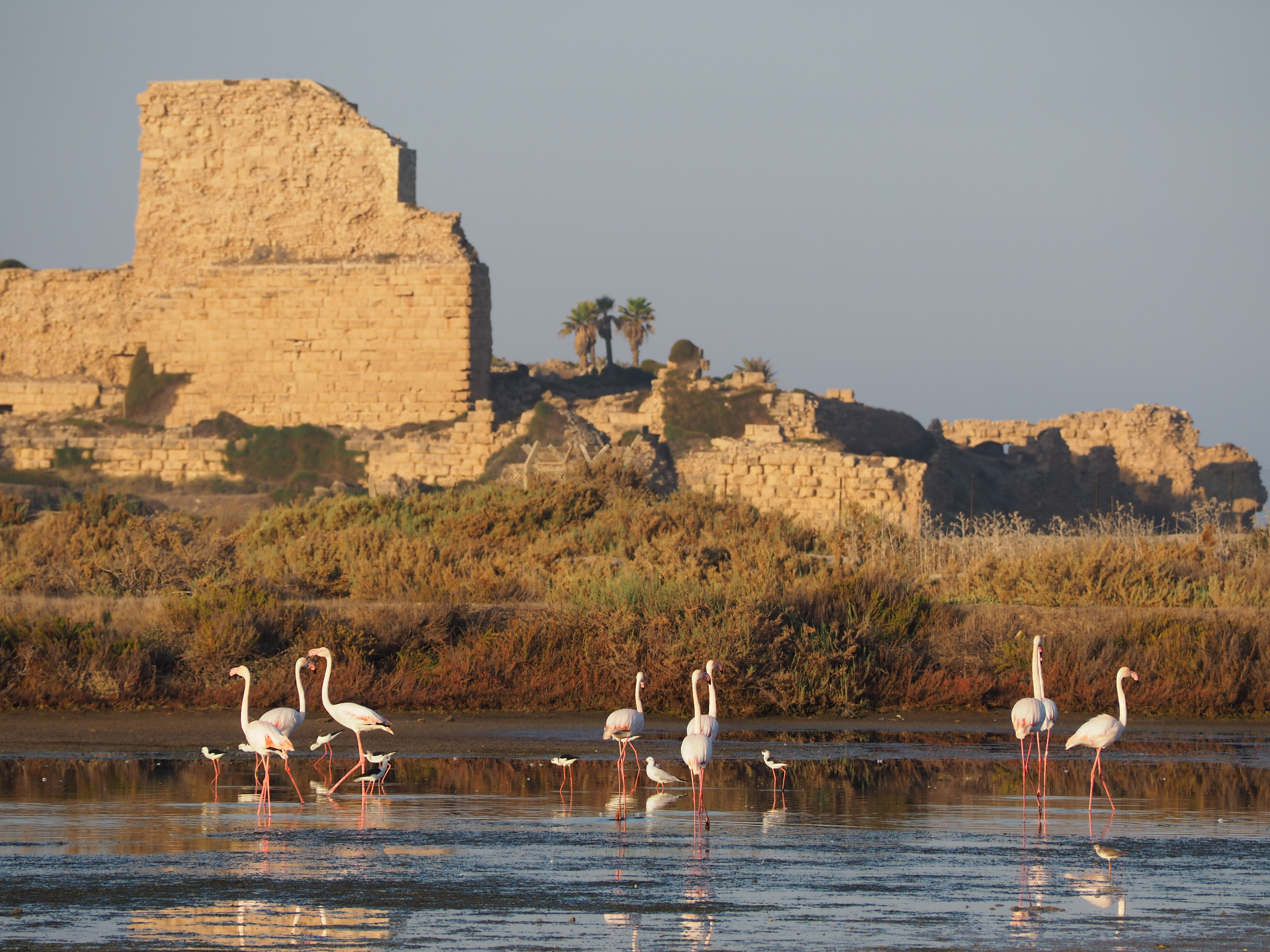
Atlit in the 21st century

== See also ==
- List of Crusader castles
