= Haneffe =

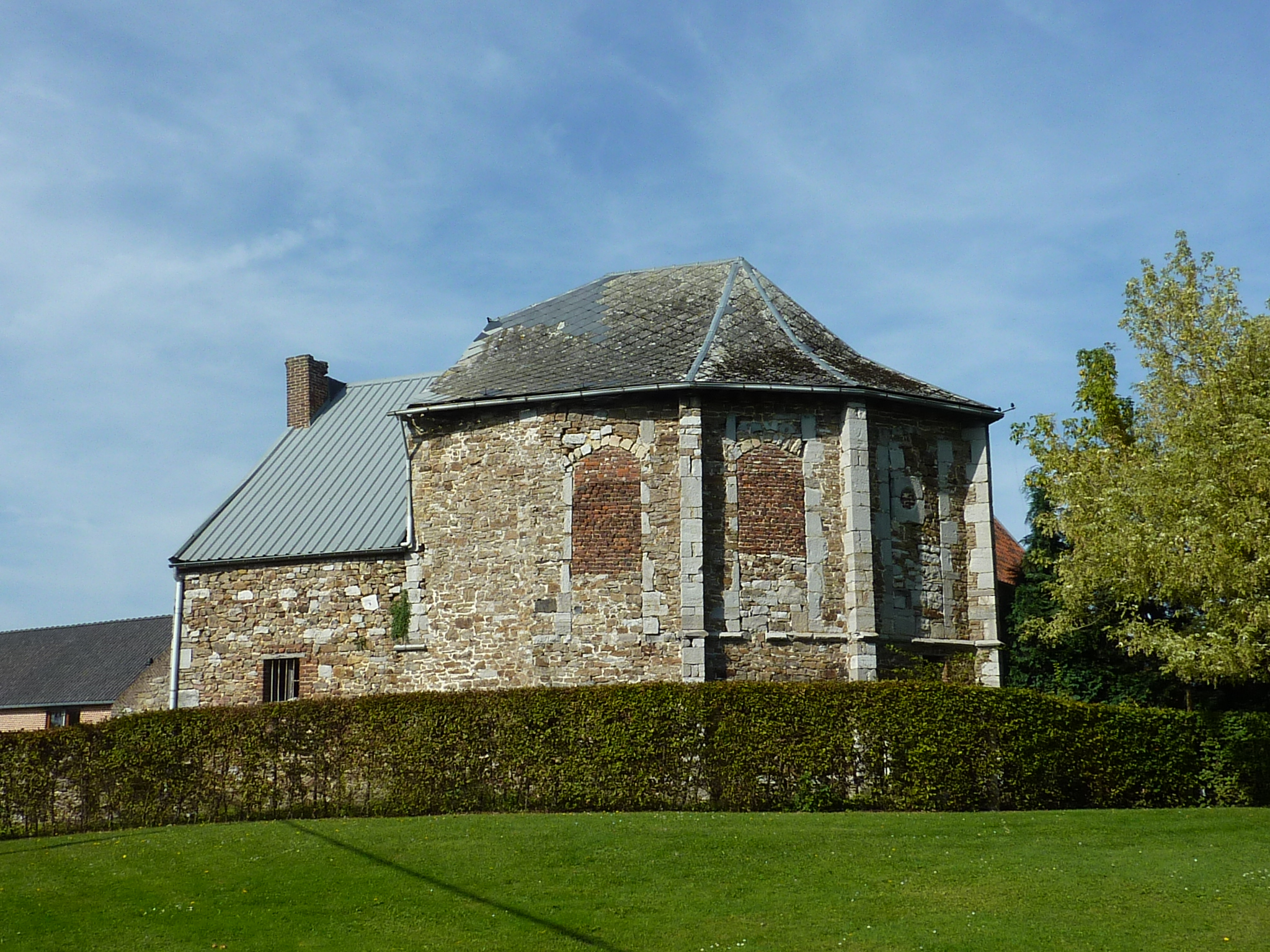
- Remains of the Knights Templar commandery, Haneffe

- Location within Belgium Location within Europe
- Coordinates: 50°38′20″N 05°19′13″E
- Country: Belgium
- Region: Wallonia
- Province: Liège
- Municipality: Donceel

Haneffe (French pronunciation: [anɛf]) is a village and district of the municipality of Donceel, located in the province of Liège in Wallonia, Belgium.

The village was mentioned as a fief in 1097. The Knights Templar established a commandery in the village, the remains of which still exists. After the dissolution of the Knights Templar, it was taken over by the Knights Hospitaller. Apart from the remains of the commandery, the village church and an adjacent fortified farm are located on the site of a medieval complex which consisted of an older church and fortification.
