= Las Ventas con Peña Aguilera =

Coordinates: 39.613°N 4.229°W

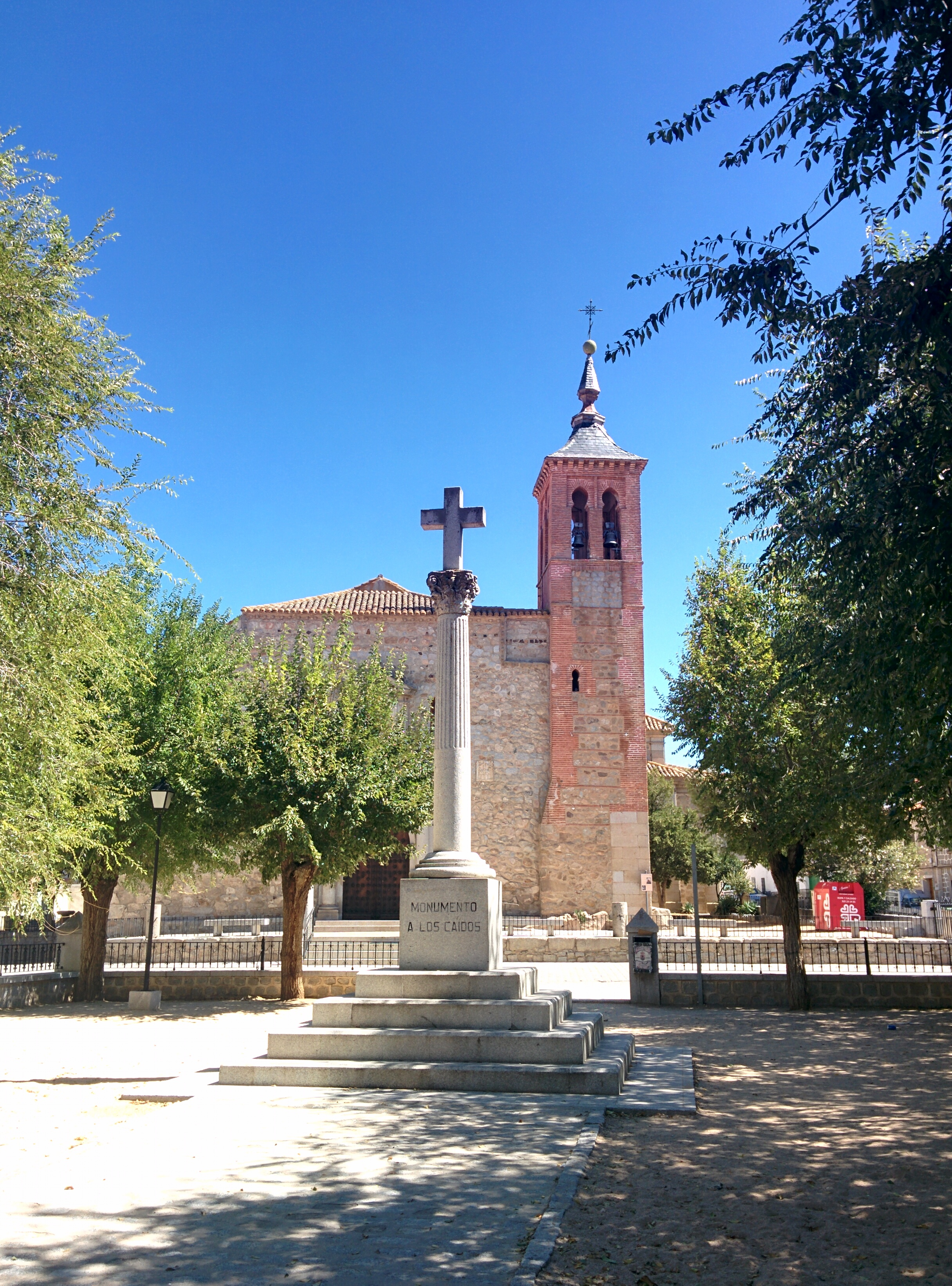

- Flag Coat of arms
- Interactive map of Las Ventas con Peña Aguilera
- Country: Spain
- Autonomous community: Castile-La Mancha
- Province: Toledo
- Municipality: Las Ventas con Peña Aguilera

Area
  - Total: 140.09 km^{2} (54.09 sq mi)
- Elevation: 792 m (2,598 ft)

Population (2025-01-01)
  - Total: 1,090
  - Density: 7.78/km^{2} (20.2/sq mi)
- Time zone: UTC+1 (CET)
  - Summer (DST): UTC+2 (CEST)

Las Ventas con Peña Aguilera is a municipality located in the province of Toledo, Castile-La Mancha, Spain. According to the 2006 census (INE), the municipality had a population of 1351 inhabitants. The municipality is located 35 km away from Toledo.

== History ==
There were originally two villages, Las Ventillas and Peña Aguilera. The name Ventas refers to the inns ("ventas" in Spanish) which accommodated travellers crossing the Montes de Toledo.

== Economy ==
The economy of the place is led by agriculture, crafts and the leather industry, mainly, it is normal to find shops related to leather goods.

Located near Cabañeros National Park and proximate to Toledo, this municipality promotes tourism centered on regional venison cuisine and leather craftsmanship.
