= Templar House, Toledo =

Coordinates: 39.8570°N 4.0207°W

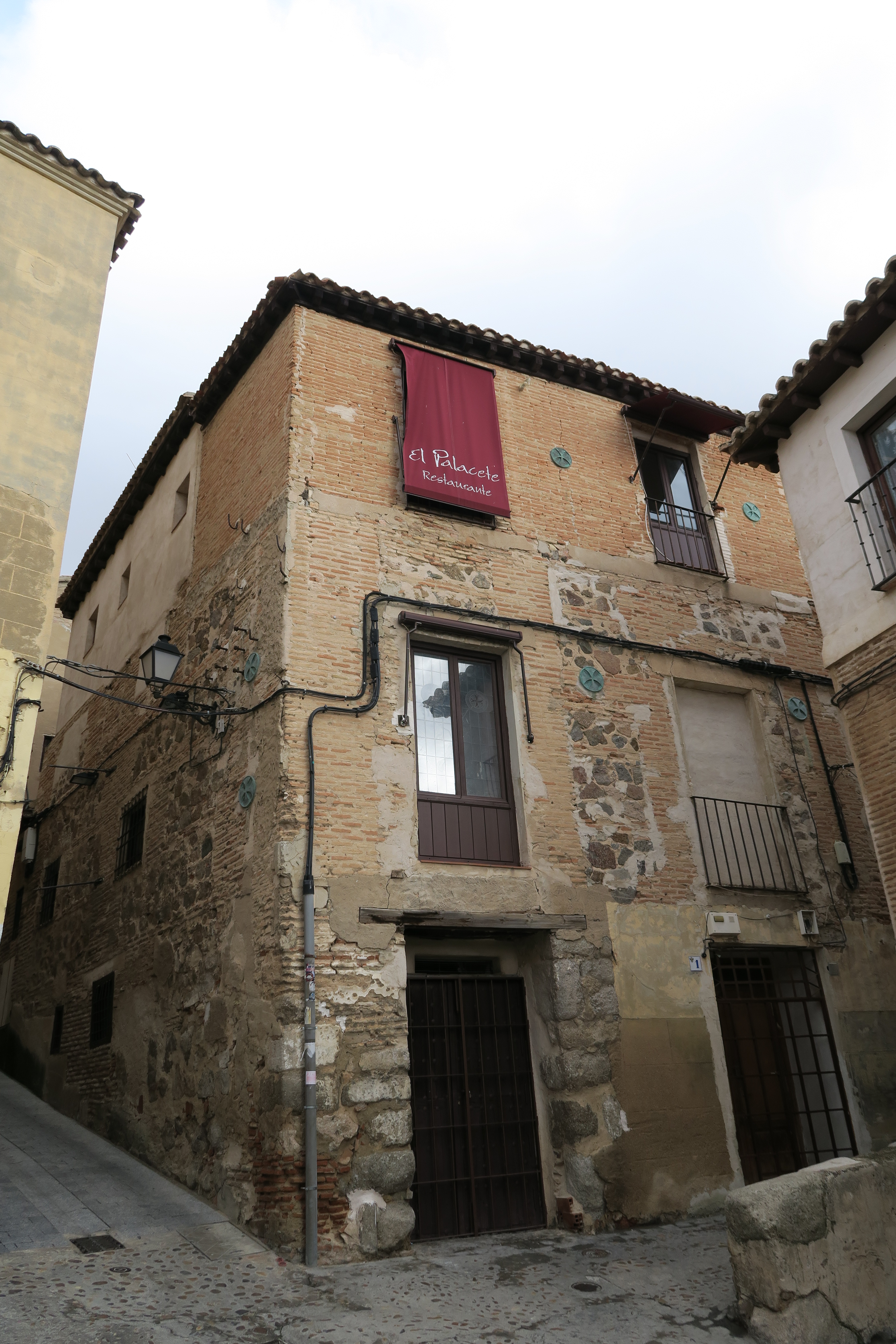
The Templar House

The Templar House in Toledo, is a residence in Castile-La Mancha, Spain. It was built and decorated between the years 1085 and 1114.

The property was once owned by the Knights Templar, and founds use as a guest house in the 14th century.

== Description ==
The most primitive elements of the whole are the remains of the hall of Caliphal time (10th century), located in the subsoil or basement, under the hall of the eastern wing. This hall has stucco walls and bicromo ornamentation, reminiscent of Mozarabic. It corresponds to an earlier state of the building, in which it would constitute the hall of the western wing of another courtyard located to its eastern side.

The ground floor is distributed around the courtyard. From the 11th–12th century the hall, the alcove and the upper chamber of the western wing are conserved, with its corresponding alfarje. It highlights the transformation of the entrance arch made of gemade of horseshoe taifa to have a Mudéjar yeseria, decorated with vegetal motifs.

In the hall of the southern wing, the most important modification consists of the suppression of the lower part of the facade, to realize in yeseria gable door, flanked by two lion protomes and framed by double-arched stone, of slightly pointed horseshoe, which has two medallions with Castilian emblems. The ensemble is framed by a rectangular ornament (arrabá) with kufic legend inscribed, from the end of the 12th century or the beginning of the 13th century.

In front, occupying space that originally belonged to another room, a raised porch was added, with a terrace on the deck, made up of two factory masons (originally also covered with yeseria); They support a complex framework of carpentry, which imitates a thick beam, in which suras III and XLVIII of the Quran are partially carved.
