= Donceel =

Municipality in Liège Province, Wallonia, Belgium

Donceel Doncél (Walloon)
- Municipality
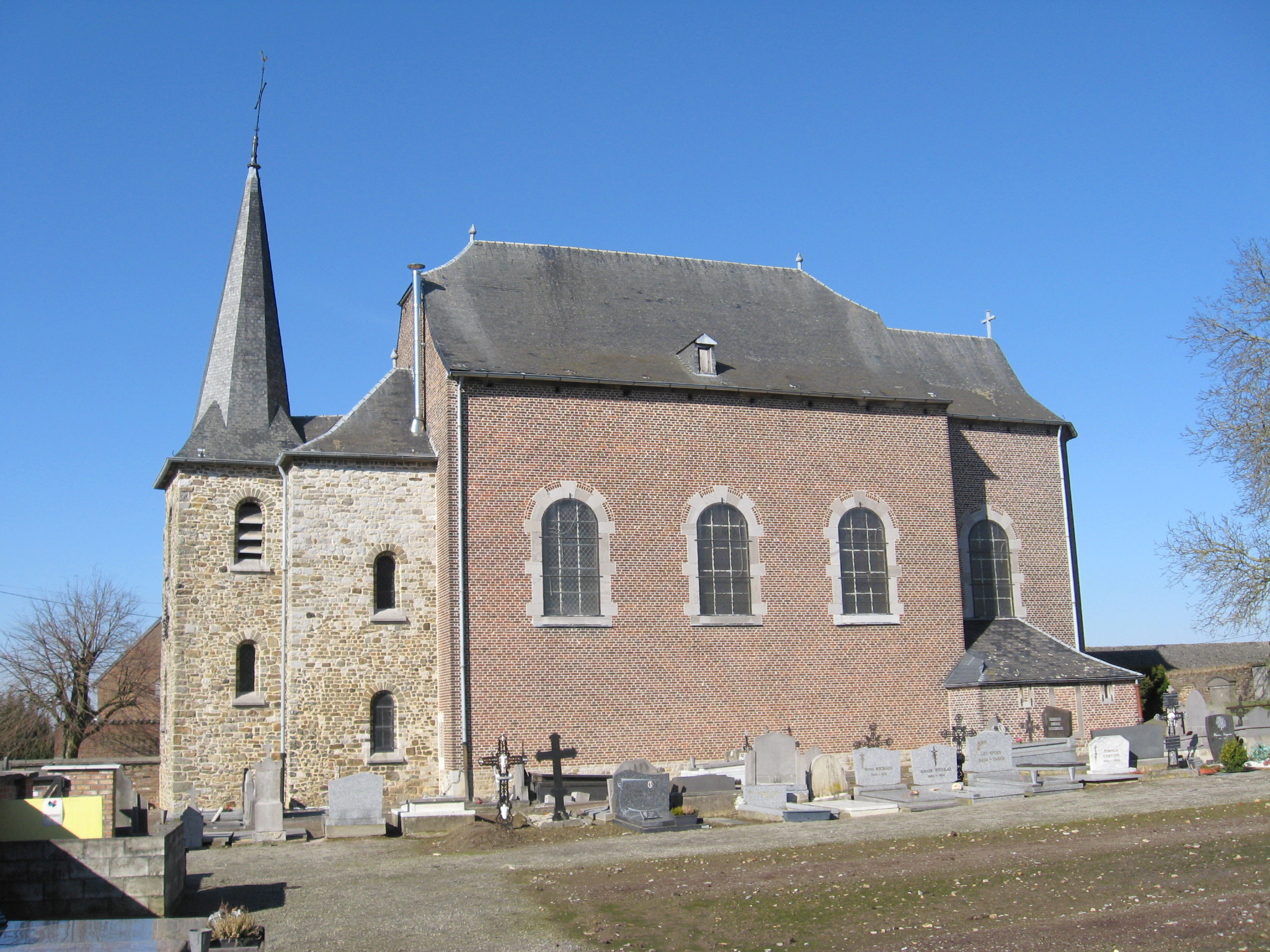
- Church of Saint-Cyr and Sainte Juliette

- Flag Coat of arms

- Location of Donceel in the province of Liège
- Interactive map of Donceel
- Location in Belgium
- Coordinates: 50°39′N 05°19′E
- Country: Belgium
- Community: French Community
- Region: Wallonia
- Province: Liège
- Arrondissement: Waremme

Government
  - Mayor: Philippe Mordant
  - Governing party: IC

Area
  - Total: 23.45 km^{2} (9.05 sq mi)

Population (2018-01-01)
  - Total: 3,048
  - Density: 130.0/km^{2} (336.6/sq mi)
- Postal codes: 4357
- NIS code: 64023
- Area codes: 04
- Website: www.donceel.be

Donceel (French pronunciation: [dɔ̃sɛl]; Walloon: Doncél) is a municipality of Wallonia located in the province of Liège, Belgium.

On January 1, 2006, Donceel had a total population of 2,828. The total area is 23.31 km^{2} which gives a population density of 121 inhabitants per km^{2}.

The municipality consists of the following districts: Donceel, Haneffe, Jeneffe, and Limont.

== Image gallery ==
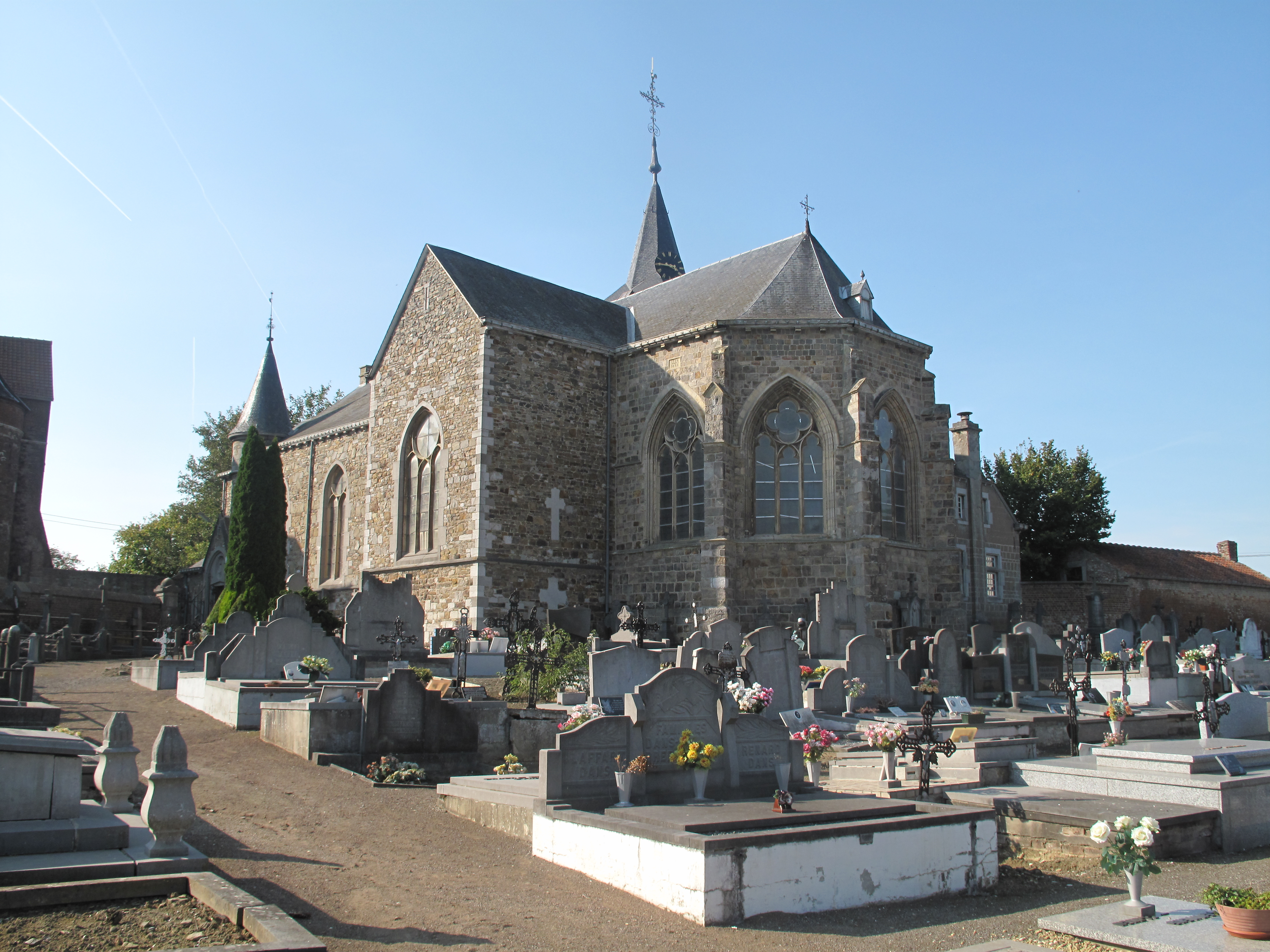
Haneffe, church

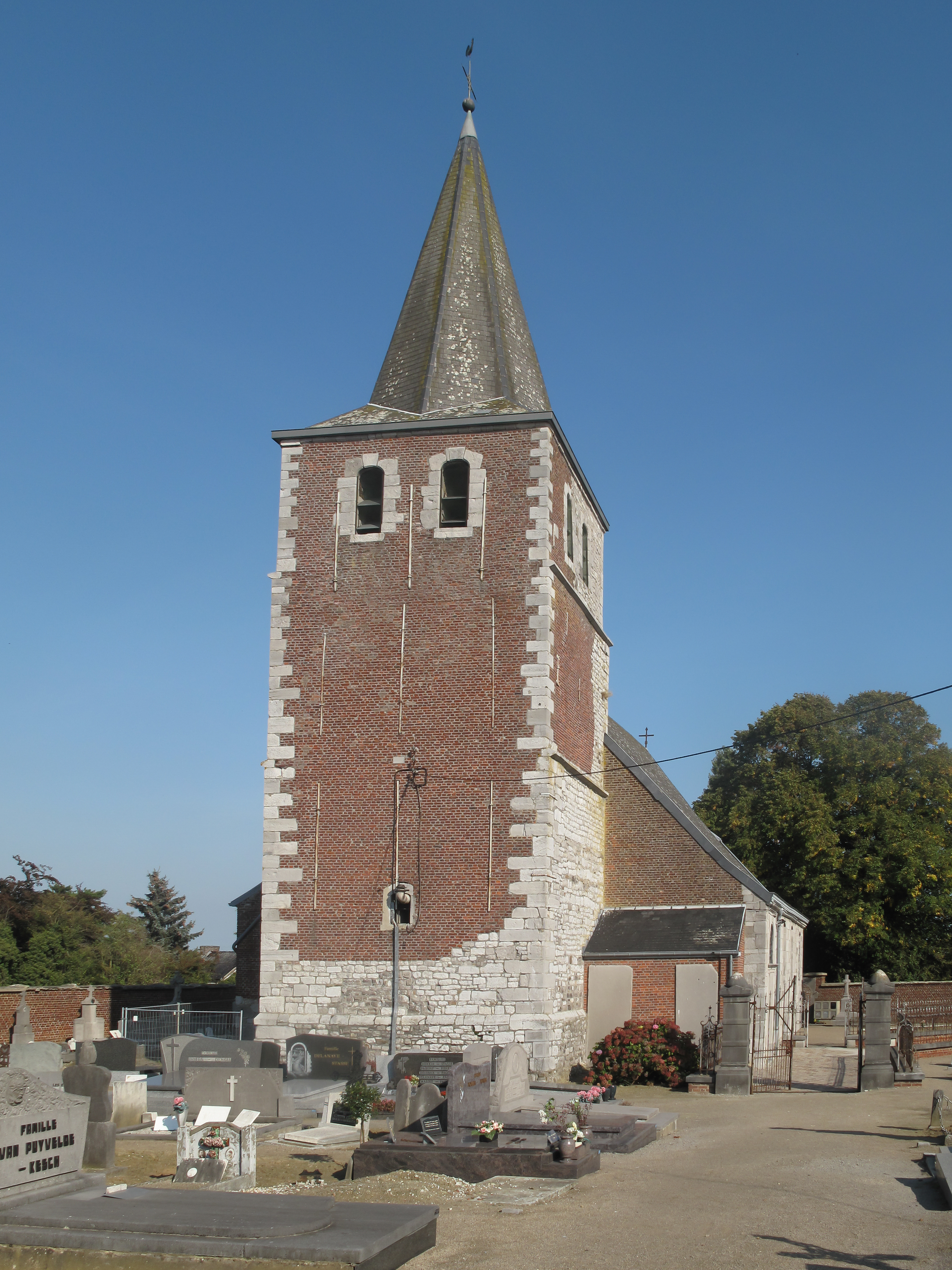
Jeneffe, church

== See also ==
- List of protected heritage sites in Donceel
