= Franco-Mongol alliance =

13th-century attempts at an alliance

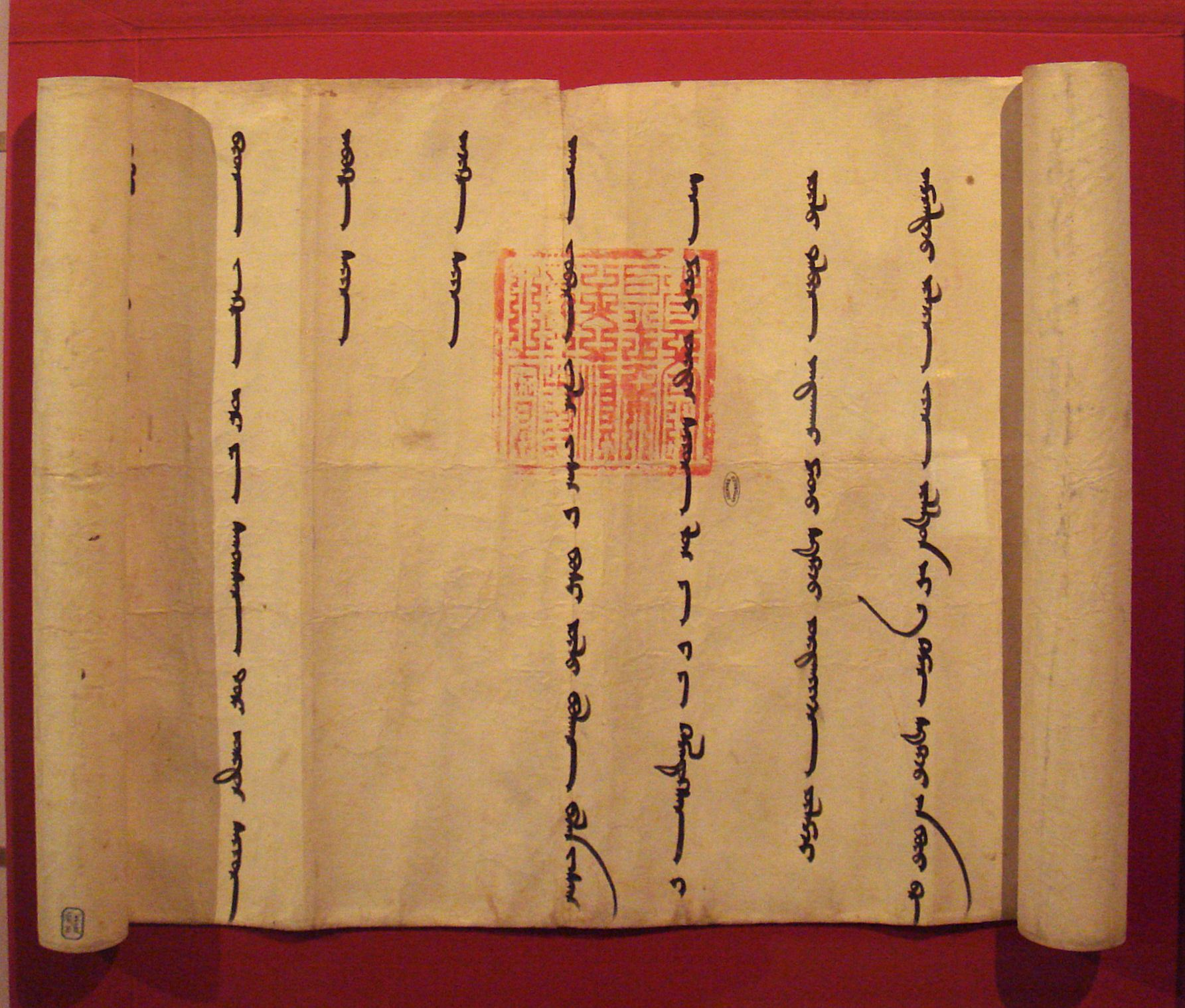
A 1305 letter from the Mongol Ilkhan Öljaitü to King Philip IV of France suggesting military collaboration, on a roll measuring 302 cm × 50 cm (9.91 ft × 1.64 ft)

Several attempts at a military alliance between the Frankish Crusaders and the Mongol Empire against the Islamic caliphates, their common enemy, were made by various leaders among them during the 13th century. Such an alliance might have seemed an obvious choice: the Mongols were already sympathetic to Christianity, given the presence of many influential Nestorian Christians in the Mongol court. The Franks in both Western Europe and the Levantine Crusader states were open to the idea of support from the East, in part owing to the long-running legend of Prester John, an Eastern king in an Eastern kingdom who many believed would one day come to the assistance of the Crusaders in the Holy Land. The Franks and Mongols also shared a common enemy in the caliphates. However, despite many messages, gifts, and emissaries over the course of several decades, the often-proposed alliance never came to fruition.

Contact between Europeans and Mongols began around 1220, with occasional messages from the papacy and European monarchs to Mongol leaders such as the Great Khan, and subsequently to the Ilkhans in Mongol-conquered Persia. Communications tended to follow a recurring pattern: the Europeans asked the Mongols to convert to Western Christianity, while the Mongols responded with demands for submission and tribute. The Mongols had already conquered many Christian and Muslim states in their advance across Asia, and after destroying the Nizaris of Alamut and the Muslim Abbasid and Ayyubid dynasties, for the next few generations fought the remaining Islamic power in the region, the Egyptian Mamluks. Hethum I, king of the Christian state of Cilician Armenia, had submitted to the Mongols in 1247, and strongly encouraged other monarchs to engage in a Christian–Mongol alliance, but was only able to persuade his son-in-law, Prince Bohemond VI of the Crusader state of Antioch, who submitted in 1260. Other Christian leaders such as the Crusaders of Acre were more mistrustful of the Mongols, perceiving them as the most significant threat in the region. The Barons of Acre therefore engaged in an unusual passive alliance with the Muslim Mamluks, allowing Egyptian forces to advance unopposed through Crusader territory to engage and defeat the Mongols at the pivotal Battle of Ain Jalut in 1260.

European attitudes began to change in the mid-1260s, from perceiving the Mongols as enemies to be feared, to potential allies against the Muslims. The Mongols sought to capitalize on this, promising a re-conquered Jerusalem to the Europeans in return for cooperation. Attempts to cement an alliance continued through negotiations with many leaders of the Mongol Ilkhanate in Persia, from its founder Hulagu through his descendants Abaqa, Arghun, Ghazan, and Öljaitü, but without success. The Mongols invaded Syria several times between 1281 and 1312, sometimes in attempts at joint operations with the Franks, but the considerable logistical difficulties involved meant that forces would arrive months apart, never able to coordinate activities in any effective way. The Mongol Empire eventually dissolved into civil war, and the Mamluks successfully recaptured all of Palestine and Syria from the Crusaders. After the fall of Acre in 1291, the remaining Crusaders retreated to the island of Cyprus. They made a final attempt to establish a bridgehead at the small island of Ruad off the coast of Tortosa, again in an attempt to coordinate military action with the Mongols, but the plan failed, and the Muslims responded by besieging the island. With the Fall of Ruad in 1302, the Crusaders lost their last foothold in the Holy Land.

Modern historians debate whether an alliance between the Franks and Mongols would have been successful in shifting the balance of power in the region, and if it would have been a wise choice on the part of the Europeans. Traditionally, the Mongols tended to see outside parties as either subjects or enemies, with little room in the middle for a concept such as allies.

== Background (1209–1244) ==
There had long been rumors and expectations among Western Europeans that a great Christian ally would come from the East. These rumors circulated as early as the First Crusade (1096–1099), and usually surged in popularity after the Crusaders lost a battle. A legend arose about a figure known as Prester John, who lived in far-off India, Central Asia, or perhaps even Ethiopia. This legend developed a life of its own, and some individuals who came from the East were greeted with expectations that they might be forces sent by the long-awaited Prester John. In 1210, news reached the West of the battles of the Mongol Kuchlug (d. 1218), leader of the largely Christian tribe of the Naimans. Kuchlug's forces had been battling the powerful Khwarezmian Empire, whose leader was the Muslim Muhammad II of Khwarezm. Rumors circulated in Europe that Kuchlug was the mythical Prester John, again battling the Muslims in the East.

During the Fifth Crusade (1213–1221), as the Christians were unsuccessfully laying siege to the Egyptian city of Damietta, the legend of Prester John became conflated with the reality of Genghis Khan's rapidly expanding empire. Mongol raiding parties were beginning to invade the eastern Islamic world in Transoxania and Persia in 1219–1221. Rumors circulated among the Crusaders that a "Christian king of the Indies", a King David who was either Prester John or one of his descendants, had been attacking Muslims in the East and was on his way to help the Christians in their crusades. In a letter dated June 20, 1221, Pope Honorius III even commented about "forces coming from the Far East to rescue the Holy Land".

After the division of the Mongol Empire in 1259, his empire was divided by his descendants into four sections or Khanates, which degenerated into civil war, although the Yuan emperors held the nominal title of khagan of the empire.

The northwestern Kipchak Khanate, known as the Golden Horde, expanded towards Europe, primarily via Hungary and Poland, while its leaders simultaneously opposed the rule of their cousins back at the Mongol capital. The southwestern section, known as the Ilkhanate, was under the leadership of Genghis Khan's grandson Hulagu. He continued to support his brother, the Great Khan, and was therefore at war with the Golden Horde, while at the same time continuing an advance towards Persia and the Holy Land.

== Papal overtures (1245–1248) ==
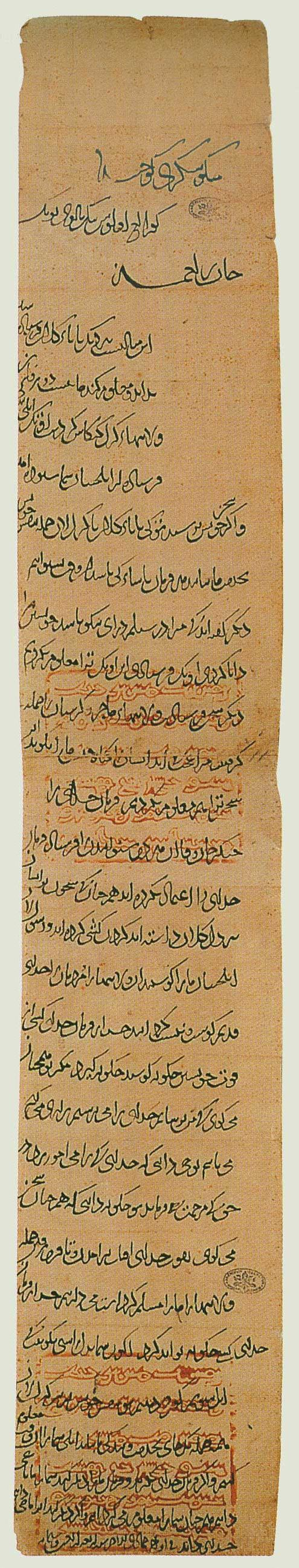
1246 letter from Güyük to Pope Innocent IV, written in Persian

The first official communications between Western Europe and the Mongol Empire occurred between Pope Innocent IV (fl. 1243–1254) and the Great Khans, via letters and envoys that were sent overland and could take years to arrive at their destination. The communications initiated what was to become a regular pattern in European–Mongol communications: the Europeans would ask the Mongols to convert to Christianity, and the Mongols would respond with demands for submission.

The Mongol invasion of Europe ended in 1242, in part because of the death of the Great Khan Ögedei, successor to Genghis Khan. When one Great Khan died, Mongols from all parts of the empire were recalled to the capital to decide who should be the next Great Khan. In the meantime, the Mongols' relentless march westward had displaced the Khawarizmi Turks, who themselves moved west, eventually allying with the Ayyubid Muslims in Egypt. Along the way, the Ayyubids took Jerusalem from the Christians in 1244. After the subsequent loss at the Battle of La Forbie, Christian kings began to prepare for a new crusade (the Seventh Crusade), declared by Pope Innocent IV in June 1245 at the First Council of Lyon. The loss of Jerusalem caused some Europeans to look to the Mongols as potential allies of Christendom, provided the Mongols could be converted to Western Christianity. In March 1245, Pope Innocent IV had issued multiple papal bulls, some of which were sent with an envoy, the Franciscan John of Plano Carpini, to the "Emperor of the Tartars". In a letter now called the Cum non solum, Pope Innocent expressed a desire for peace, and asked the Mongol ruler to become a Christian and to stop killing Christians. However, the new Great Khan Güyük, who had been installed at Karakorum in 1246, replied only with a demand for the submission of the pope, and a visit from the rulers of the West in homage to Mongol power:

You should say with a sincere heart: "I will submit and serve you." Thou thyself, at the head of all the Princes, come at once to serve and wait upon us! At that time I shall recognize your submission. If you do not observe God's command, and if you ignore my command, I shall know you as my enemy.

— Güyük Khan's letter to Pope Innocent IV, 1246

A second mission sent in 1245 by Pope Innocent was led by the Dominican Ascelin of Lombardia, who met with the Mongol commander Baiju near the Caspian Sea in 1247. Baiju, who had plans to capture Baghdad, welcomed the possibility of an alliance and sent a message to Rome via his envoys Aïbeg and Serkis. They then returned a year later with Pope Innocent's letter, Viam agnoscere veritatis, in which he appealed to the Mongols to "cease their menaces".

== Christian vassals ==
As the Mongols of the Ilkhanate continued to move towards the Holy Land, city after city fell to them. The typical Mongol pattern was to give a region one chance to surrender. If the target acquiesced, the Mongols absorbed the populace and warriors into their own Mongol army, which they would then use to further expand the empire. If a community did not surrender, the Mongols forcefully took the settlement or settlements and slaughtered everyone they found. Faced with the option of subjugation to or combat with the nearby Mongol horde, many communities chose the former, including some Christian realms.

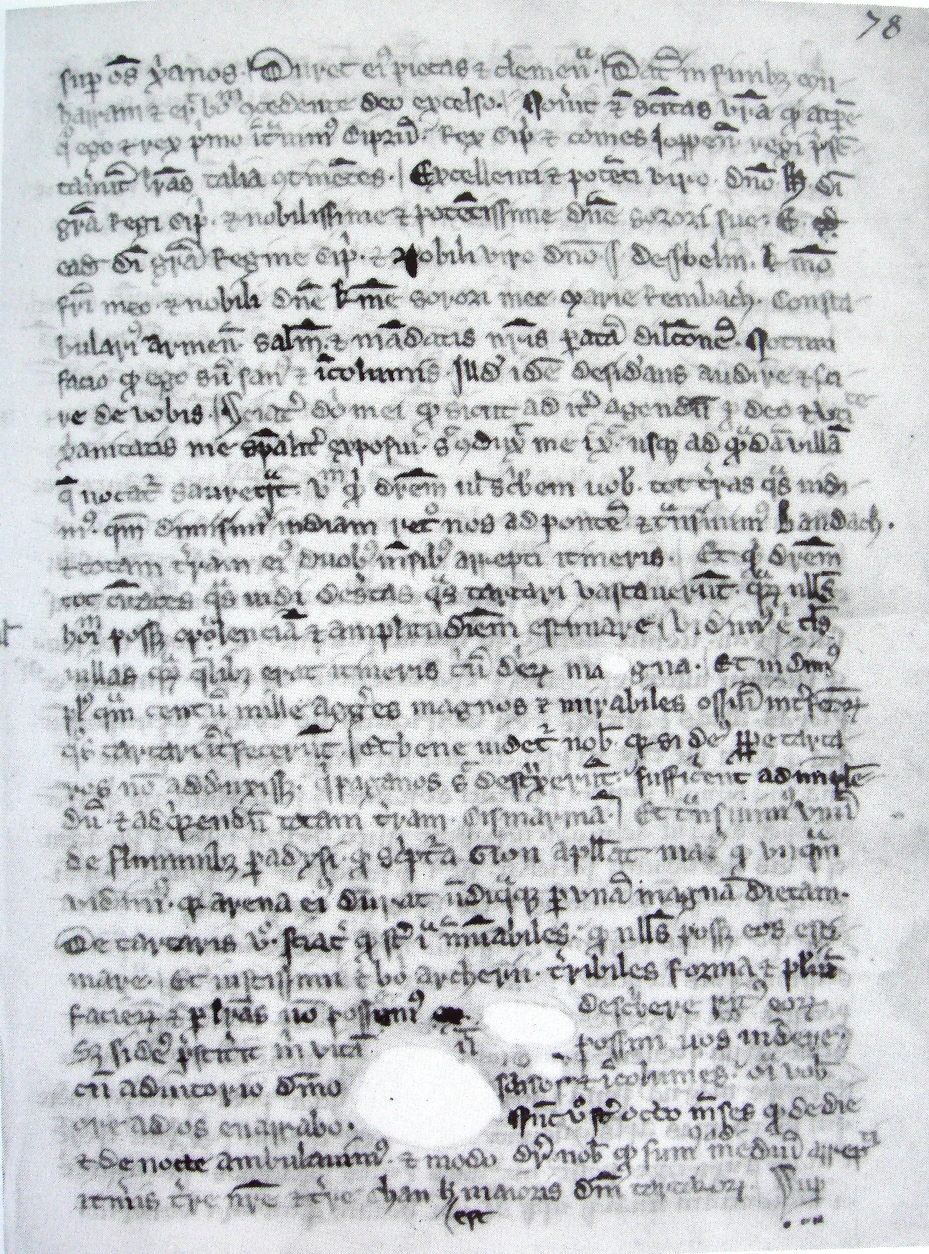
1248 letter from Sempad the Constable to Henry I of Cyprus and Jean d'Ibelin

Starting in 1220, the Kingdom of Georgia was repeatedly attacked, and in 1243 Queen Rusudan formally submitted to the Mongols, turning Georgia into a vassal state which then became a regular ally in the Mongol military conquests. Hethum I of Armenia submitted in 1247, and over the following years encouraged other monarchs to enter into a Christian-Mongol alliance. He sent his brother Sempad to the Mongol court in Karakorum, and Sempad's positive letters about the Mongols were influential in European circles.

=== Antioch ===
The Principality of Antioch was one of the earliest Crusader States, founded in 1098 during the First Crusade. At the time of the Mongol advance, it was under the rule of Bohemond VI. Under the influence of his father-in-law, Hethum I, Bohemond too submitted Antioch to Hulagu in 1260. A Mongol representative and a Mongol garrison were stationed in the capital city of Antioch, where they remained until the Principality was destroyed by the Mamluks in 1268. Bohemond was also required by the Mongols to accept the restoration of a Greek Orthodox patriarch, Euthymius, as a way of strengthening ties between the Mongols and the Byzantine Empire. In return for this loyalty, Hulagu awarded Bohemond all the Antiochene territories which had been lost to the Muslims in 1243. However, for his relations with the Mongols, Bohemond was also temporarily excommunicated by Jacques Pantaléon, the Latin Patriarch of Jerusalem, though this was lifted in 1263.

Around 1262 or 1263, the Mamluk leader Baibars attempted an attack on Antioch, but the principality was saved by Mongol intervention. In later years the Mongols were not able to offer as much support. In 1264–1265 the Mongols were able to attack only the frontier fort of al-Bira. In 1268 Baibars completely overran the rest of Antioch, ending the 170-year-old principality.

In 1271, Baibars sent a letter to Bohemond threatening him with total annihilation and taunting him for his alliance with the Mongols:

Our yellow flags have repelled your red flags, and the sound of the bells has been replaced by the call: "Allâh Akbar!" ... Warn your walls and your churches that soon our siege machinery will deal with them, your knights that soon our swords will invite themselves in their homes ... We will see then what use will be your alliance with Abagha.

— Letter from Baibars to Bohemond VI, 1271

Bohemond was left with no estates except the County of Tripoli, which was itself to fall to the Mamluks in 1289.

== Saint Louis and the Mongols ==
Louis IX of France had communications with the Mongols throughout his own crusades. During his first venture to Outremer, he was met on December 20, 1248 in Cyprus by two Mongol envoys, Nestorians from Mosul named David and Marc, who brought a letter from the Mongol commander in Persia, Eljigidei. The letter communicated a more conciliatory tone than previous Mongol demands for submission, and Eljigidei's envoys suggested that King Louis should land in Egypt while Eljigidei attacked Baghdad, as a way of preventing the Muslims of Egypt and those of Syria from joining forces. Louis responded by sending the emissary Andrew of Longjumeau to the Great Khan Güyük, but Güyük died from drink before the emissary arrived at his court. Güyük's widow Oghul Qaimish simply gave the emissary a gift and a condescending letter to take back to King Louis, instructing him to continue sending tributes each year.

Louis's campaign against Egypt did not go well. He captured Damietta, but lost his entire army at the Battle of Al Mansurah, and was himself captured by the Egyptians. His release was eventually negotiated in return for a ransom—some of which was a loan from the Knights Templar—and the surrender of the city of Damietta. A few years later, in 1253 he sought allies among both the Ismaili Order of Assassins and the Mongols. When he saw a letter from Hethum's brother, the Armenian noble Sempad, which spoke well of the Mongols, Louis dispatched the Franciscan William of Rubruck to the Mongol court. The Mongol leader Möngke replied in 1254 through a letter carried by William asking for the king's submission to Mongol authority.

Louis attempted a second crusade (the Eighth Crusade) in 1270. The Mongol Ilkhanate leader Abaqa wrote to Louis IX offering military support as soon as the Crusaders landed in Palestine, but Louis instead went to Tunis in modern Tunisia. His intention was evidently to first conquer Tunis, and then to move his troops along the coast to reach Alexandria in Egypt. The French historians Alain Demurger and Jean Richard suggest that this crusade may still have been an attempt at coordination with the Mongols, in that Louis may have attacked Tunis instead of Syria following a message from Abaqa that he would not be able to commit his forces in 1270, and asking to postpone the campaign to 1271. Envoys from the Byzantine emperor, the Armenians and the Mongols of Abaqa were present at Tunis, but events put a stop to plans for a continued crusade when Louis died of illness. According to legend, his last word was "Jerusalem".

== Relations with the Ilkhanate ==
=== Hulagu (1256–1265) ===
Hulagu Khan, a grandson of Genghis Khan, was an avowed shamanist, but was nevertheless very tolerant of Christianity. His mother Sorghaghtani Beki, his favorite wife Doquz Khatun, and several of his closest collaborators were Nestorian Christians. One of his most important generals, Kitbuqa, was a Nestorian Christian of the Naiman tribe.

In 1238, the European kings Louis IX of France and Edward I of England rejected the offer of the Nizari Imam Muhammad III of Alamut and the Abbasid caliph Al-Mustansir for a Muslim–Christian alliance against the Mongols. Military collaboration between the Mongols and their Christian vassals became substantial in 1258–1260.

==== Fall of Baghdad (1258) ====
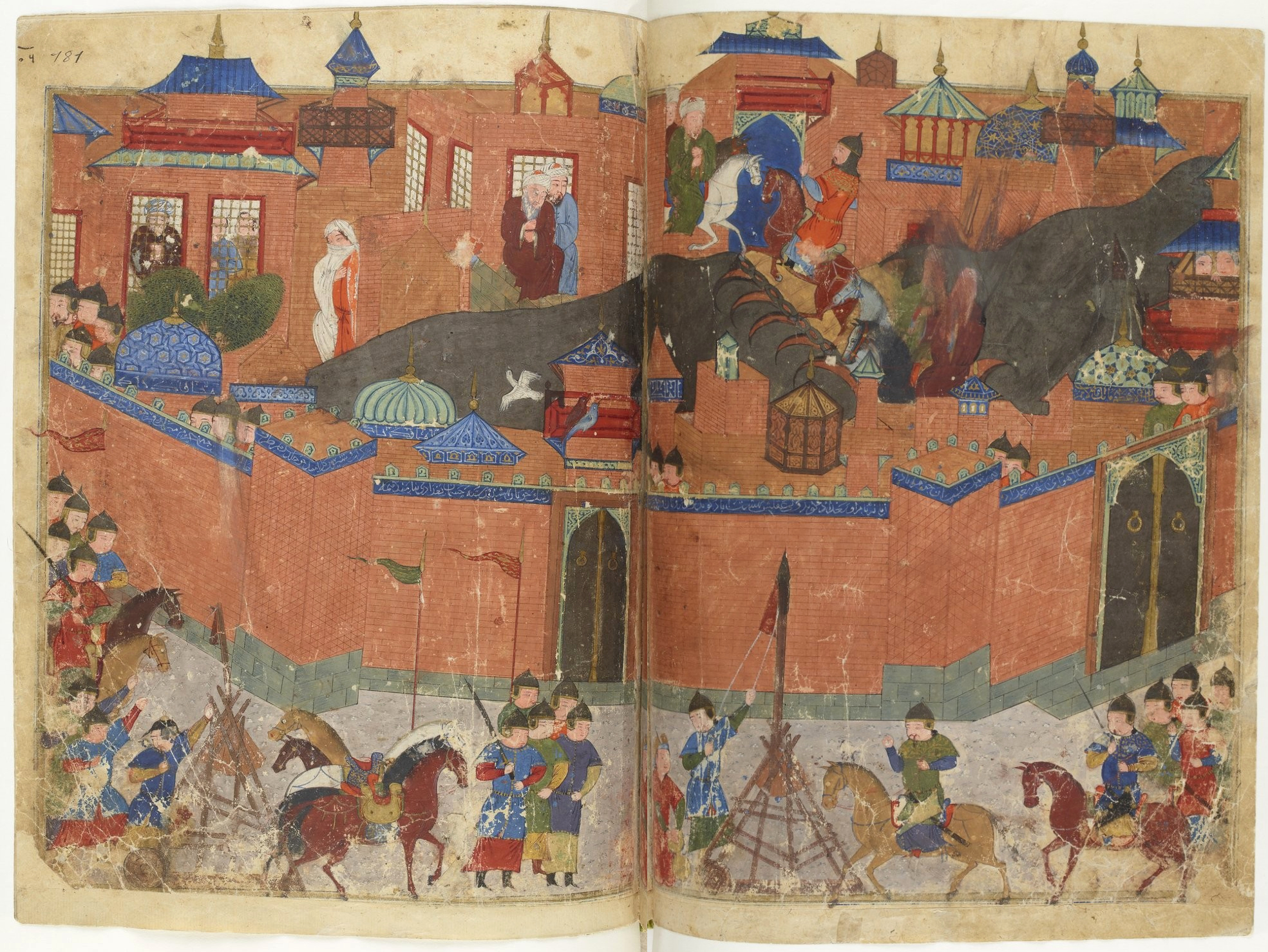
Mongol attack on Baghdad (1258)

The Abbasid Caliphate, founded by Abu al-‘Abbās ‘Abdu'llāh ibn Muhammad as-Saffāḥ, the great-great-grandson of Muhammad's uncle Abbas, in 749, had ruled northeastern Africa, Arabia, and the Near East, even though their rule had by 1258 shrunk to only southern and central Iraq. The Abbasids' seat of power for almost 500 years was Baghdad, a city considered to be the jewel of Islam and one of the largest and most powerful cities in the world. But under attack from the Mongols, the city fell on February 15, 1258. When Hulagu conquered the city, his army was allowed to pillage the city for a full week, in a calculated act designed to show the consequences of resisting Mongol power. The Christians of Baghdad were also spared, at the behest of Doquz Khatun.

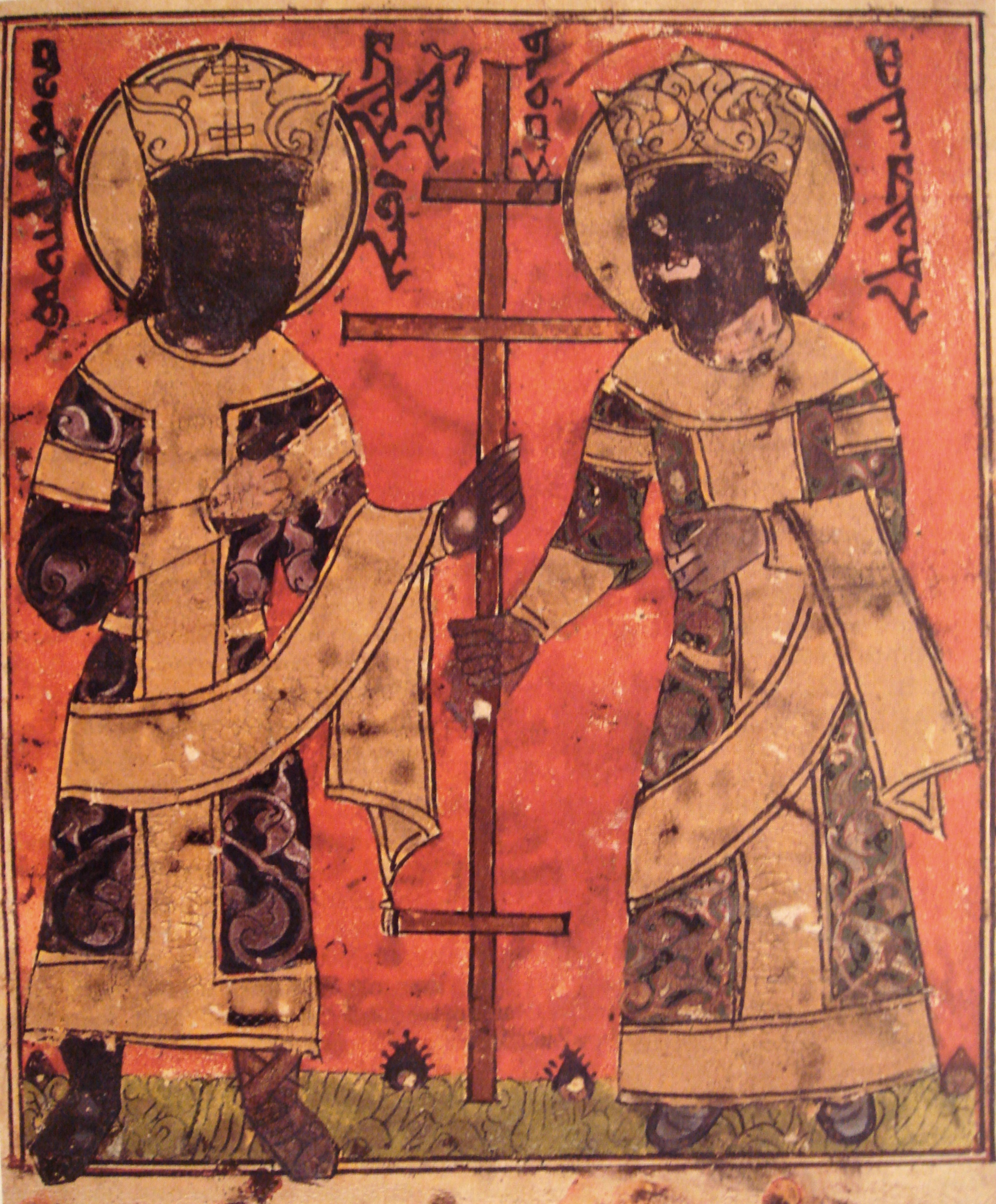
Hulagu and Queen Doquz Khatun depicted as the new "Constantine and Helen", in a Syriac Bible

For Asiatic Christians, the fall of Baghdad was cause for celebration. Hulagu and his Christian queen came to be considered as God's agents against the enemies of Christianity, and were compared to the influential 4th-century Christian Emperor Constantine the Great and his revered mother, Empress Helena, an icon of the Christian church. The Armenian historian Kyrakos of Gandzak praised the Mongol royal couple in texts for the Armenian Church, and Bar Hebraeus, a bishop of the Syriac Orthodox Church, also referred to them as a Constantine and Helena, writing of Hulagu that nothing could compare to the "king of kings" in "wisdom, high-mindedness, and splendid deeds".

==== Invasion of Syria (1260) ====
After Baghdad, in 1260 the Mongols with their Christian subjects conquered Muslim Syria, domain of the Ayyubid dynasty. They took together the city of Aleppo in January, and in March, the Mongols with the Armenians and the Franks of Antioch took Damascus, under the Christian Mongol general Kitbuqa. With both the Abbasid and Ayyubid dynasties destroyed, the Near East, as described by historian Steven Runciman, "was never again to dominate civilization." The last Ayyubid sultan An-Nasir Yusuf died shortly thereafter, and with the Islamic power centers of Baghdad and Damascus gone, the center of Islamic power transferred to the Egyptian Mamluks in Cairo. However, before the Mongols could continue their advance towards Egypt, they needed to withdraw because of the death of the Great Khan. Hulagu was needed back at the capital and took the bulk of his forces with him, leaving a small force under Kitbuqa to occupy Palestine during his absence. Mongol raiding parties were sent south into Palestine towards Egypt, with small Mongol garrisons of about 1,000 established in Gaza.

==== Battle of Ain Jalut ====
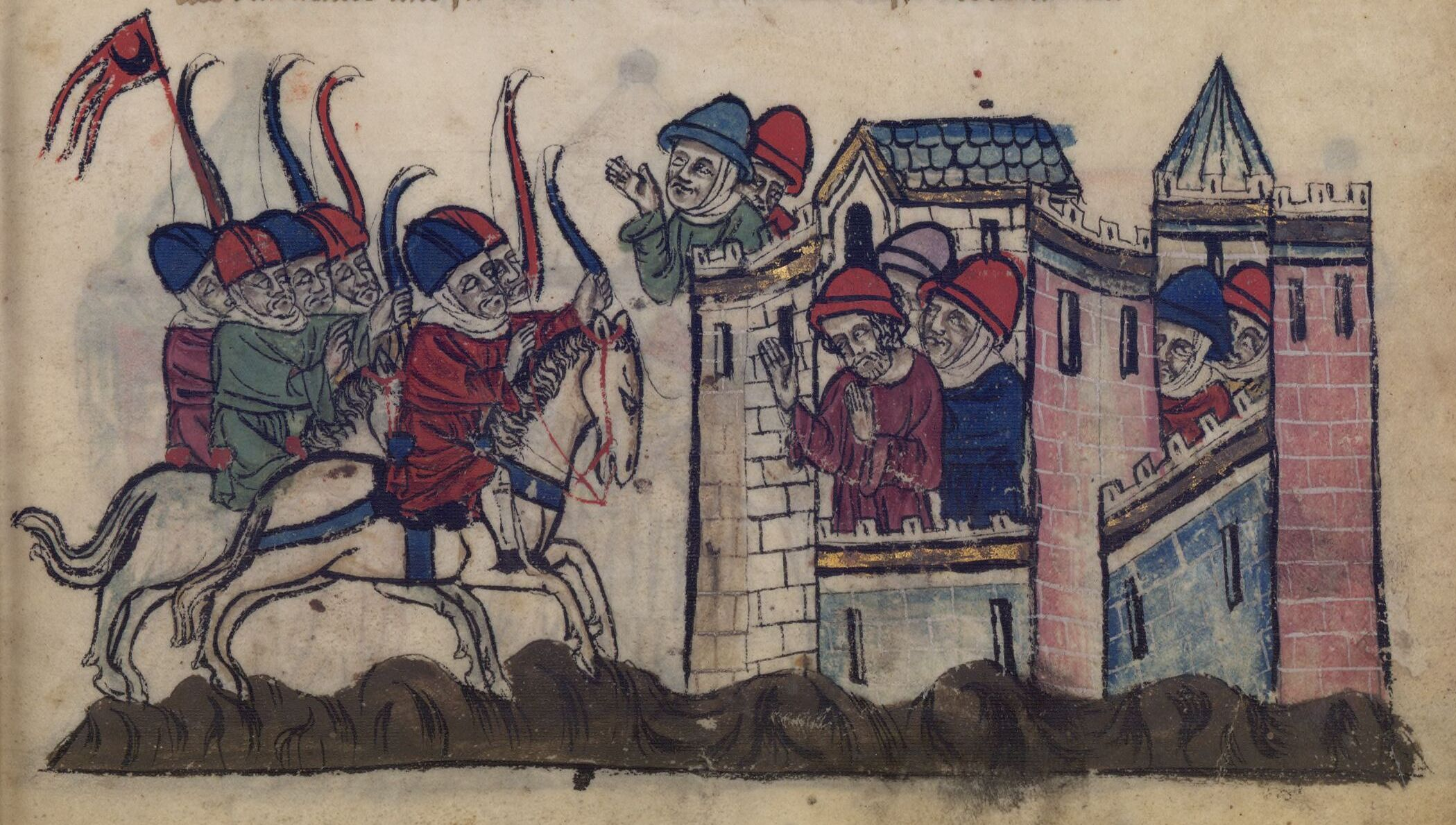
Kitbuqa besieging Sidon after his nephew's murder by Julian Grenier

Despite the cooperation between the Mongols and their Christian subjects in Antioch, other Christians in the Levant regarded the Mongol approach with unease. Jacques Pantaléon, the Patriarch of Jerusalem, saw the Mongols as a clear threat, and had written to the Pope to warn him about them in 1256. The Franks did, however, send the Dominican David of Ashby to the court of Hulagu in 1260. In Sidon, Julian Grenier, Lord of Sidon and Beaufort, described by his contemporaries as irresponsible and light-headed, took an opportunity to raid and plunder the area of the Beqaa Valley in Mongol territory. One of the Mongols killed was Kitbuqa's nephew, and in retaliation, Kitbuqa raided the city of Sidon. These events added to the level of distrust between the Mongols and the Crusader forces, whose own center of power was now in the coastal city of Acre.

The Franks of Acre did their best to maintain a position of cautious neutrality between the Mongols and the Mamluks. Despite their long history of enmity with the Mamluks, the Franks acknowledged that the Mongols were a greater threat, and after careful debate, chose to enter into a passive truce with their previous adversaries. The Franks allowed the Mamluk forces to move northward through Christian territory to engage the Mongols, in exchange for an agreement that the Franks could purchase any captured Mongol horses at a low price. The truce allowed the Mamluks to camp and re-supply near Acre, and engage the Mongols at Ain Jalut on September 3, 1260. The Mongol forces were already depleted due to their main force withdrawing, so with the passive assistance of the Franks, the Mamluks were able to achieve a decisive and historic victory over the Mongols. The remainder of the Mongol army retreated to Cilician Armenia, where they were received and re-equipped by Hethum I. Ain Jalut marked a major turning point in the history of the Mongols, as it was the first major battle that they had lost, and set the western border for what had seemed an unstoppable expansion of the Mongol Empire.

==== Papal communications ====
In the 1260s, a change occurred in the European perception of the Mongols, and they became regarded less as enemies, and more as potential allies in the fight against the Muslims. As recently as 1259, Pope Alexander IV had been encouraging a new crusade against the Mongols, and had been extremely disappointed in hearing that the monarchs of Antioch and Armenia had submitted to Mongol overlordship. Alexander had put the monarchs' cases on the agenda of his upcoming council, but died in 1261 just months before the council could be convened, and before the new crusade could be launched. For a new pope, the choice fell to Pantaléon, the same Patriarch of Jerusalem who had earlier been warning of the Mongol threat. He took the name Pope Urban IV, and tried to raise money for a new crusade.

On April 10, 1262, the Mongol leader Hulagu sent through John the Hungarian a new letter to King Louis IX of France, again offering an alliance. The letter explained that previously, the Mongols had been under the impression that the pope was the leader of the Christians, but now they realized that the true power rested with the French monarchy. The letter mentioned Hulagu's intention to capture Jerusalem for the benefit of the pope, and asked for Louis to send a fleet against Egypt. Hulagu promised the restoration of Jerusalem to the Christians, but also still insisted on Mongol sovereignty, in the Mongols' quest for conquering the world. It is unclear whether or not King Louis actually received the letter, but at some point it was transmitted to Pope Urban, who answered in a similar way as his predecessors. In his papal bull Exultavit cor nostrum, Urban congratulated Hulagu on his expression of goodwill towards the Christian faith, and encouraged him to convert to Christianity.

Historians dispute the exact meaning of Urban's actions. The mainstream view, exemplified by British historian Peter Jackson, holds that Urban still regarded the Mongols as enemies at this time. This perception began changing a few years later, during the pontificate of Pope Clement IV (1265–68), when the Mongols were seen more as potential allies. However, the French historian Jean Richard argues that Urban's act signaled a turning point in Mongol-European relations as early as 1263, after which the Mongols were considered as actual allies. Richard also argues that it was in response to this forming coalition between the Franks, Ilkhanid Mongols and Byzantines, that the Mongols of the Golden Horde allied with the Muslim Mamluks in return. However, the mainstream view of historians is that though there were many attempts at forming an alliance, the attempts proved unsuccessful.

=== Abaqa (1265–1282) ===
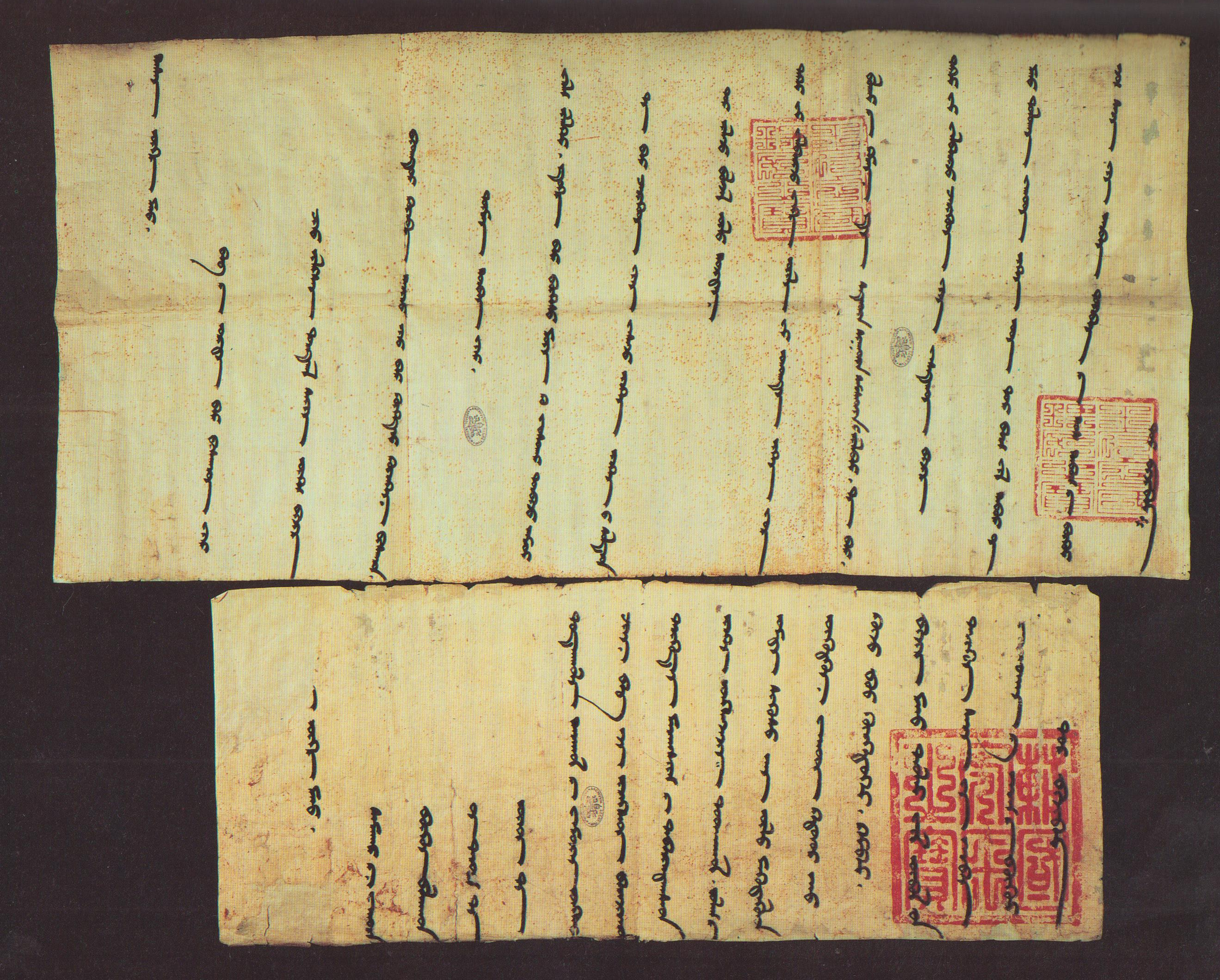
Top: Letter of Ghazan Khan to Pope Boniface VII, dispatched from Qos Qabuγ (Quš Qapuγ) in AH 701, corresponding to the Year of the Tiger (1302 CE). Bottom: Letter of Abaqa Khan to the Papal Court, dispatched from Aras in the Year of the Rabbit (1267 or 1279 CE).

Hulagu died in 1265, and was succeeded by Abaqa (1234–1282), who further pursued Western cooperation. Though a Buddhist, upon his succession he married Maria Palaiologina, an Eastern Orthodox Christian and the illegitimate daughter of the Byzantine Emperor Michael VIII Palaiologos. Abaqa corresponded with Pope Clement IV through 1267 and 1268, sending envoys to both Clement and King James I of Aragon. In a 1268 message to Clement, Abaqa promised to send troops to aid the Christians. It is unclear if this was what led to James's unsuccessful expedition to Acre in 1269. James initiated a small crusade, but a storm descended on his fleet as they attempted their crossing, forcing most of the ships to turn back. The crusade was ultimately handled by James's two sons Fernando Sanchez and Pedro Fernandez, who arrived in Acre in December 1269. Abaqa, despite his earlier promises of assistance, was in the process of facing another threat, an invasion in Khorasan by Mongols from Turkestan, and so could only commit a small force for the Holy Land, which did little but brandish the threat of an invasion along the Syrian frontier in October 1269. He raided as far as Harim and Afamiyaa in October, but retreated as soon as Baibars' forces advanced.

==== Edward I's crusade (1269–1274) ====
In 1269, the English Prince Edward (the future Edward I), inspired by tales of his great-uncle Richard I, and the second crusade of the French King Louis, started on a crusade of his own, the Ninth Crusade. The number of knights and retainers that accompanied Edward on the crusade was quite small, possibly around 230 knights, with a total complement of approximately 1,000 people, transported in a flotilla of 13 ships. Edward understood the value of an alliance with the Mongols, and upon his arrival in Acre on May 9, 1271, he immediately sent an embassy to the Mongol ruler Abaqa, requesting assistance. Abaqa answered positively to Edward's request, asking him to coordinate his activities with his general Samagar, whom he sent on an offensive against the Mamluks with 10,000 Mongols to join Edward's army. But Edward was able only to engage in some fairly ineffectual raids that did not actually achieve success in gaining new territory. For example, when he engaged in a raid into the Plain of Sharon, he proved unable to even take the small Mamluk fortress of Qaqun. However, Edward's military operations, limited though they were, were still of assistance in persuading the Mamluk leader Baibars to agree to a 10-year truce between the city of Acre and the Mamluks, signed in 1272. Edward's efforts were described by historian Reuven Amitai as "the nearest thing to real Mongol-Frankish military coordination that was ever to be achieved, by Edward or any other Frankish leader."

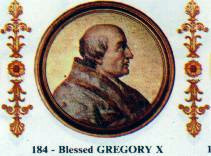
Pope Gregory X (1210–1276) promulgated a new crusade in liaison with the Mongols in 1274.

==== Council of Lyon (1274) ====
In 1274 Pope Gregory X convened the Second Council of Lyon. Abaqa sent a delegation of 13 to 16 Mongols to the council, which created a great stir, particularly when three of their members underwent a public baptism. Abaqa's Latin secretary Rychaldus delivered a report to the Council which outlined previous European-Ilkhanid relations under Abaqa's father, Hulagu, affirming that after Hulagu had welcomed Christian ambassadors to his court, he had agreed to exempt Latin Christians from taxes and charges, in exchange for their prayers for the Khan. According to Rychaldus, Hulagu had also prohibited the molestation of Frank establishments, and had committed to return Jerusalem to the Franks. Rychaldus assured the assembly that even after Hulagu's death, his son Abaqa was still determined to drive the Mamluks from Syria.

At the council, Pope Gregory promulgated a new crusade in liaison with the Mongols, putting in place a vast program in his "Constitutions for the zeal of the faith", with four main elements: imposing a new tax for three years, forbidding trade with Muslims, arranging the supply of ships by the Italian maritime republics, and the alliance of the West with both Byzantium and the Mongol Ilkhan Abaqa. Abaqa then sent another embassy, led by the Georgian Vassali brothers, to further notify Western leaders of military preparations. Gregory answered that his legates would accompany the crusade, and that they would be in charge of coordinating military operations with the Ilkhan.

However, the papal plans were not supported by the other European monarchs, who had lost enthusiasm for the Crusades. Only one western monarch attended the council, the elderly James I of Aragon, who could only offer a small force. There was fundraising for a new crusade, and plans were made, but never followed through. The projects essentially came to a halt with the death of Pope Gregory on January 10, 1276, and the money which had been raised to finance the expedition was instead distributed in Italy.

==== Invasion of Syria (1280–1281) ====
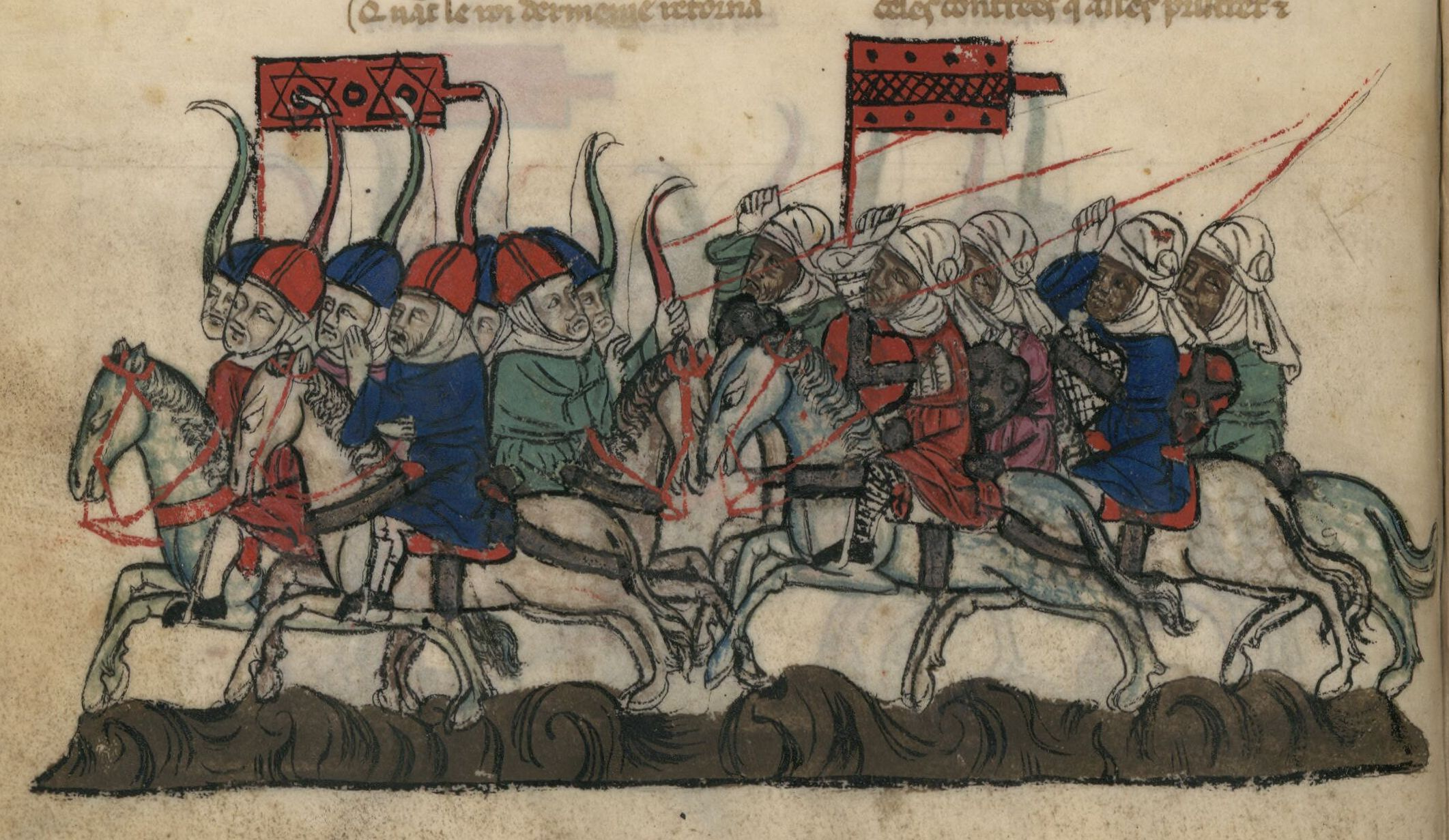
Defeat of the Mongols (left) at the 1281 Battle of Homs

Without support from the Europeans, some Franks in Outremer, particularly the Knights Hospitaller of the fortress of Marqab, and to some extent the Franks of Cyprus and Antioch, attempted to join in combined operations with the Mongols in 1280–1281. The death of the Egyptian leader Baibars in 1277 led to disorganization in the Muslim territories, making conditions ripe for a new action by other factions in the Holy Land. The Mongols seized the opportunity, organized a new invasion of Syria, and in September 1280 occupied Bagras and Darbsak, followed by Aleppo on October 20. The Mongol leader Abaqa, taking advantage of his momentum, sent envoys to Edward I of England, the Franks of Acre, Hugh III of Cyprus, and Bohemond VII of Tripoli (son of Bohemond VI), requesting their support for the campaign. But the Crusaders were not organized enough themselves to be of much help. In Acre, the Patriarch's Vicar replied that the city was suffering from hunger, and that the king of Jerusalem was already embroiled in another war. Local Knights Hospitaller from Marqab (in the area which had previously been Antioch/Tripoli) were able to make raids into the Beqaa Valley, as far as the Mamluk-held Krak des Chevaliers in 1280 and 1281. Hugh and Bohemond of Antioch mobilized their armies, but their forces were prevented from joining those of the Mongols by Baibars' successor, the new Egyptian Sultan Qalawun. He advanced north from Egypt in March 1281, positioned his own army between the Franks and Mongols, and then further divided the potential allies by renewing a truce with the Barons of Acre on May 3, 1281, extending it for another ten years and ten months (a truce he would later breach). He also renewed a second 10-year truce with Bohemond VII of Tripoli on July 16, 1281, and affirmed pilgrim access to Jerusalem.

In September 1281 the Mongols returned, with 19,000 of their own troops, plus 20,000 others including Armenians under Leo III, Georgians, and 200 Knights Hospitaller from Marqab, who sent a contingent even though the Franks of Acre had agreed a truce with the Mamluks. The Mongols and their auxiliary troops fought against the Mamluks at the Second Battle of Homs on October 30, 1281, but the encounter was indecisive, with the Sultan suffering heavy losses. In retaliation, Qalawun later besieged and captured the Hospitaller fortress of Marqab in 1285.

=== Arghun (1284–1291) ===
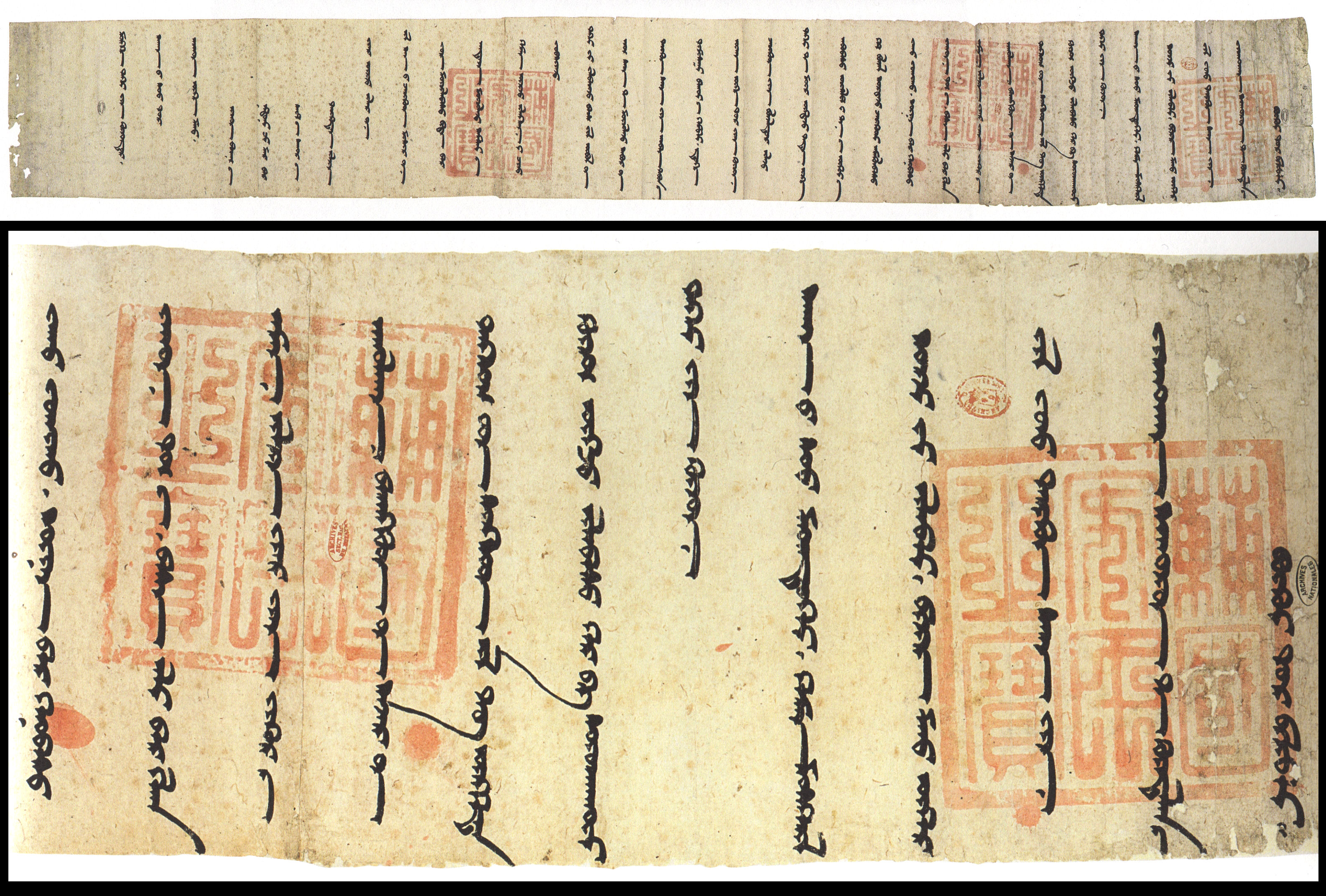
1289 letter of Arghun to Philip IV of France, in the Mongolian script, with detail of the introduction. The letter was conveyed to the French king by Buscarel of Gisolfe.

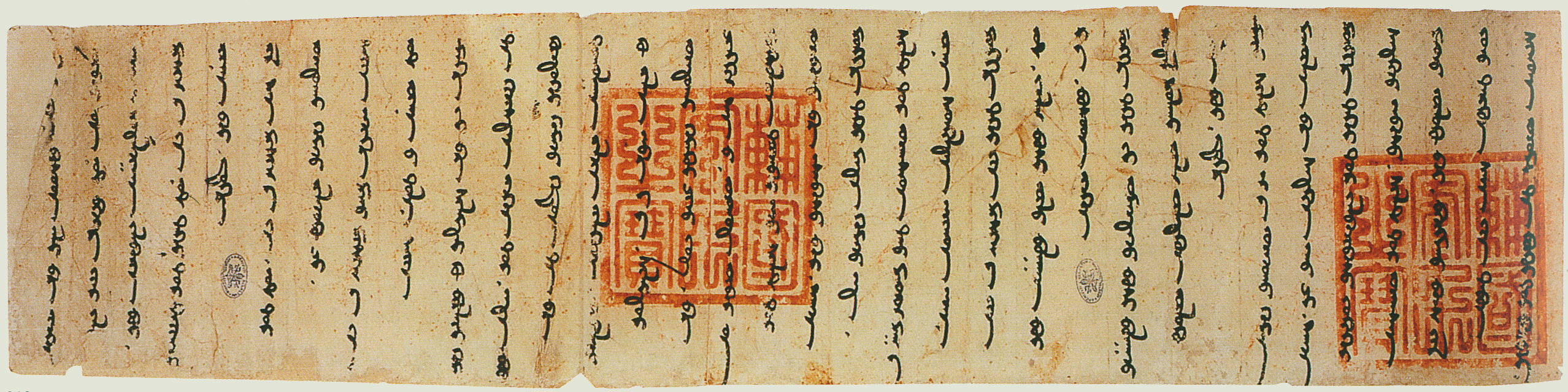
1290 letter from Arghun to Pope Nicholas IV.

Abaqa died in 1282 and was briefly replaced by his brother Tekuder, who had converted to Islam. Tekuder reversed Abaqa's policy of seeking an alliance with the Franks, offering instead an alliance to the Mamluk Sultan Qalawun, who continued his own advance, capturing the Hospitaller fortress of Margat in 1285, Lattakia in 1287, and the County of Tripoli in 1289. However, Tekuder's pro-Muslim stance was not popular, and in 1284, Abaqa's Buddhist son Arghun, with the support of Kublai Khan, led a revolt and had Tekuder executed. Arghun then revived the idea of an alliance with the West, and sent multiple envoys to Europe.

The first of Arghun's embassies was led by Isa Kelemechi, a Christian Assyrian interpreter who had been head of Kublai Khan's Office of Western Astronomy and sent to Greater Iran at the order of the Great Khan. The embassy was sent because the Great Khan Kublai (Qubilai) ordered Arghun to free Holy Land and protect Christians. Kelemechi met with Pope Honorius IV in 1285, offering to "remove" the Saracens (Muslims) and divide "the land of Sham, namely Egypt" with the Franks. The second embassy, and probably the most famous, was that of the elderly cleric Rabban Bar Sauma, who had been visiting the Ilkhanate during a remarkable pilgrimage from China to Jerusalem.

Through Bar Sauma and other later envoys, such as Buscarello de Ghizolfi, Arghun promised the European leaders that if Jerusalem were conquered, he would have himself baptized and would return Jerusalem to the Christians. Bar Sauma was greeted warmly by the European monarchs, but Western Europe was no longer as interested in the Crusades, and the mission to form an alliance was ultimately fruitless. England did respond by sending a representative, Geoffrey of Langley, who had been a member of Edward I's Crusade 20 years earlier, and was sent to the Mongol court as an ambassador in 1291.

==== Genoese shipmakers ====
Another link between Europe and the Mongols was attempted in 1290, when the Genoese endeavored to assist the Mongols with naval operations. The plan was to construct and man two galleys to attack Mamluk ships in the Red Sea, and operate a blockade of Egypt's trade with India. As the Genoese were traditional supporters of the Mamluks, this was a major shift in policy, apparently motivated by the attack of the Egyptian Sultan Qalawun on the Cilician Armenians in 1285. To build and man the fleet, a squadron of 800 Genoese carpenters, sailors and crossbowmen went to Baghdad, working on the Tigris. However, due to a feud between the Guelphs and Ghibellines, the Genoese soon degenerated into internal bickering, and killed each other in Basra, putting an end to the project. Genoa finally cancelled the agreement and signed a new treaty with the Mamluks instead.

All these attempts to mount a combined offensive between the Franks and Mongols were too little and too late. In May 1291, the city of Acre was conquered by the Egyptian Mamluks in the siege of Acre. When Pope Nicholas IV learned of this, he wrote to Arghun, again asking him to be baptized and to fight against the Mamluks. But Arghun had died on March 10, 1291, and Pope Nicholas died as well in March 1292, putting an end to their efforts towards combined action.

=== Ghazan (1295–1304) ===
After Arghun's death, he was followed in rapid succession by two brief and fairly ineffective leaders, one of whom only held power for a few months. Stability was restored when Arghun's son Ghazan took power in 1295, though to secure cooperation from other influential Mongols, he made a public conversion to Islam when he took the throne, marking a major turning point in the state religion of the Ilkhanate. Despite being an official Muslim, however, Ghazan remained tolerant of multiple religions, and worked to maintain good relations with his Christian vassal states such as Cilician Armenia and Georgia.

In 1299/1300, the Mongols engaged in battles for cities in Syria, and engaged in raids as far south as Gaza.

In 1299, he made the first of what were to be three attempts to invade Syria. As he launched his new invasion, he also sent letters to the Franks of Cyprus (Henry II, King of Cyprus; and the heads of the military orders), inviting them to come join him in his attack on the Mamluks in Syria. The Mongols successfully took the city of Aleppo, and were there joined by their vassal King Hethum II, whose forces participated in the rest of the offensive. The Mongols soundly defeated the Mamluks in the Battle of Wadi al-Khazandar, on December 23 or 24, 1299. This success in Syria led to wild rumors in Europe that the Mongols had successfully re-captured the Holy Land, and had even conquered the Mamluks in Egypt and were on a mission to conquer Tunisia in northern Africa. But in reality, Jerusalem had been neither taken nor even besieged. All that had been managed were some Mongol raids into Palestine in early 1300. The raids went as far as Gaza, passing through several towns, probably including Jerusalem. But when the Egyptians again advanced from Cairo in May, the Mongols retreated without resistance.

In July 1300, the Crusaders launched naval operations to press the advantage. A fleet of sixteen galleys with some smaller vessels was equipped in Cyprus, commanded by King Henry of Cyprus, accompanied by his brother Amalric, Lord of Tyre, the heads of the military orders, and Ghazan's ambassador "Chial" (Isol the Pisan). The ships left Famagusta on July 20, 1300, to raid the coasts of Egypt and Syria: Rosette, Alexandria, Acre, Tortosa, and Maraclea, before returning to Cyprus.

==== Ruad expedition ====
Ghazan announced that he would return by November 1300, and sent letters and ambassadors to the West so that they could prepare themselves. After their own naval raids, the Cypriots attempted a major operation to re-take the former Syrian Templar stronghold of Tortosa. They prepared the largest force they could muster at the time, approximately 600 men: 300 under Amalric, and similar contingents from the Templars and Hospitallers. In November 1300 they attempted to occupy Tortosa on the mainland, but were unable to gain control of the city. The Mongols were delayed, and the Cypriots moved offshore to the nearby island of Ruad to establish a base. The Mongols continued to be delayed, and the bulk of the Crusader forces returned to Cyprus, leaving only a garrison on Ruad. In February 1301, Ghazan's Mongols finally made a new advance into Syria. The force was commanded by the Mongol general Kutlushka, who was joined by Armenian troops, and Guy of Ibelin and John, lord of Giblet. But despite a force of 60,000, Kutluskha could do little else than engage in some raids around Syria, and then retreated.

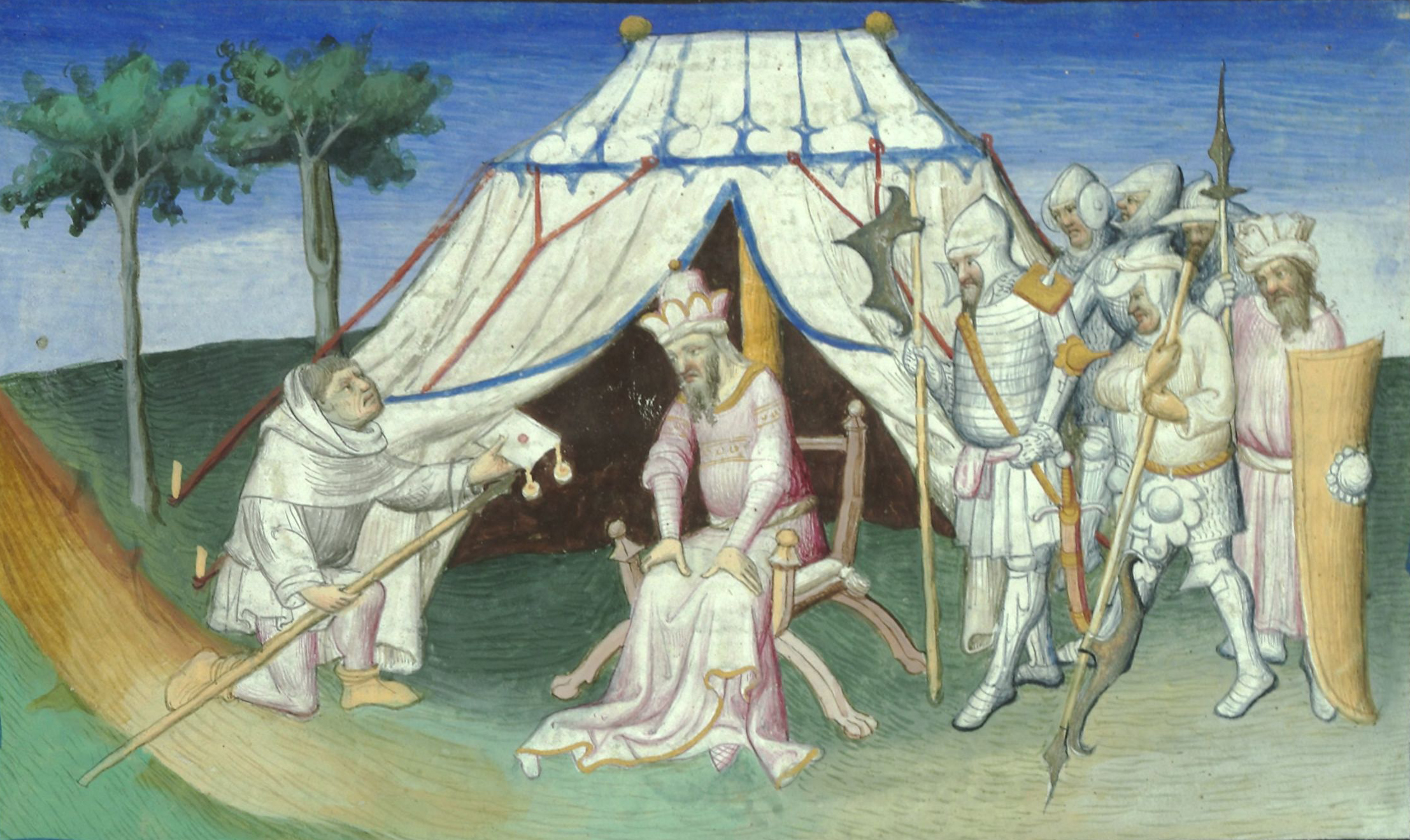
In a miniature from a 15th-century Travels of Marco Polo, Ghazan orders the King of Armenia Hethum II to accompany Kutlushka on the 1303 attack on Damascus.

Plans for combined operations between the Franks and the Mongols were again made for the following winter offensives, in 1301 and 1302. But in mid-1301 the island of Ruad was attacked by the Egyptian Mamluks. After a lengthy siege, the island surrendered in 1302. The Mamluks slaughtered many of the inhabitants, and captured the surviving Templars to send them to prison in Cairo. In late 1301, Ghazan sent letters to the pope asking him to send troops, priests, and peasants, to make the Holy Land a Frank state again.

In 1303, Ghazan sent another letter to Edward I, via Buscarello de Ghizolfi, who had also been an ambassador for Arghun. The letter reiterated their ancestor Hulagu's promise that the Ilkhans would give Jerusalem to the Franks in exchange for help against the Mamluks. That year, the Mongols again attempted to invade Syria, appearing in great strength (about 80,000) together with the Armenians. But they were again defeated at Homs on March 30, 1303, and at the decisive Battle of Shaqhab, south of Damascus, on April 21, 1303. It is considered to be the last major Mongol invasion of Syria. Ghazan died on May 10, 1304, and Frankish dreams of a rapid reconquest of the Holy Land were destroyed.

=== Oljeitu (1304–1316) ===
Oljeitu, also named Mohammad Khodabandeh, was great-grandson of Ilkhanate founder Hulagu, and brother and successor of Ghazan. In his youth he at first converted to Buddhism, and then later to Sunni Islam with his brother Ghazan, and changed his first name to the Islamic Muhammad. In April 1305, Oljeitu sent letters to Philip IV of France, Pope Clement V, and Edward I of England. As had his predecessors, Oljeitu offered a military collaboration between the Mongols and the Christian states of Europe, against the Mamluks. Various European states prepared a crusade, but were delayed. In the meantime Oljeitu launched a last campaign against the Mamluks (1312–1313), in which he was unsuccessful. A final settlement with the Mamluks would only be found when Oljeitu's son Abu Sa'id signed the Treaty of Aleppo in 1322.

== Last contacts ==
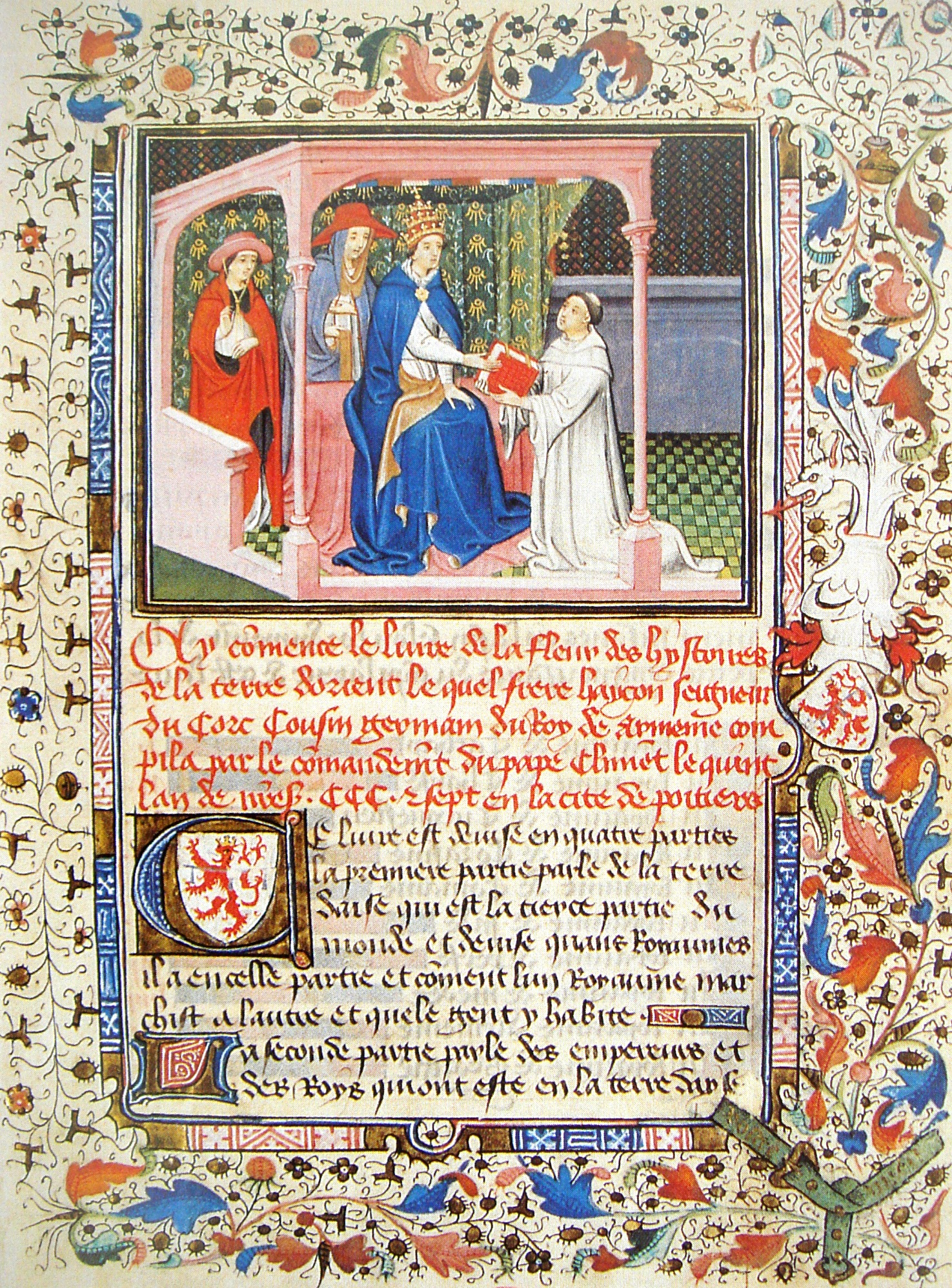
Hayton of Corycus presenting his report on the Mongols to Pope Clement V in 1307.

In the 14th century, diplomatic contact continued between the Franks and the Mongols, until the Ilkhanate dissolved in the 1330s, and the ravages of the Black Death in Europe caused contact with the East to be severed. A few marital alliances between Christian rulers and the Mongols of the Golden Horde continued, such as when the Byzantine emperor Andronicus II gave daughters in marriage to Toqta (d. 1312) and later to his successor Özbeg (1312–1341).

After Abu Sa'id, relations between Christian princes and the Ilkhanate became very sparse. Abu Sa'id died in 1335 with neither heir nor successor, and the Ilkhanate lost its status after his death, becoming a plethora of little kingdoms run by Mongols, Turks, and Persians.

In 1336, an embassy to the French Pope Benedict XII in Avignon was sent by Toghun Temür, the last Yuan emperor in Dadu. The embassy was led by two Genoese travelers in the service of the Mongol emperor, who carried letters representing that the Mongols had been eight years (since Archbishop John of Montecorvino's death) without a spiritual guide, and earnestly desired one. Pope Benedict appointed four ecclesiastics as his legates to the Khan's court. In 1338, a total of 50 ecclesiastics were sent by the pope to Peking, among them John of Marignolli, who returned to Avignon in 1353 with a letter from the Yuan emperor to Pope Innocent VI. But soon, the Han Chinese rose up and drove the Mongols out of China, establishing the Ming Dynasty in 1368.

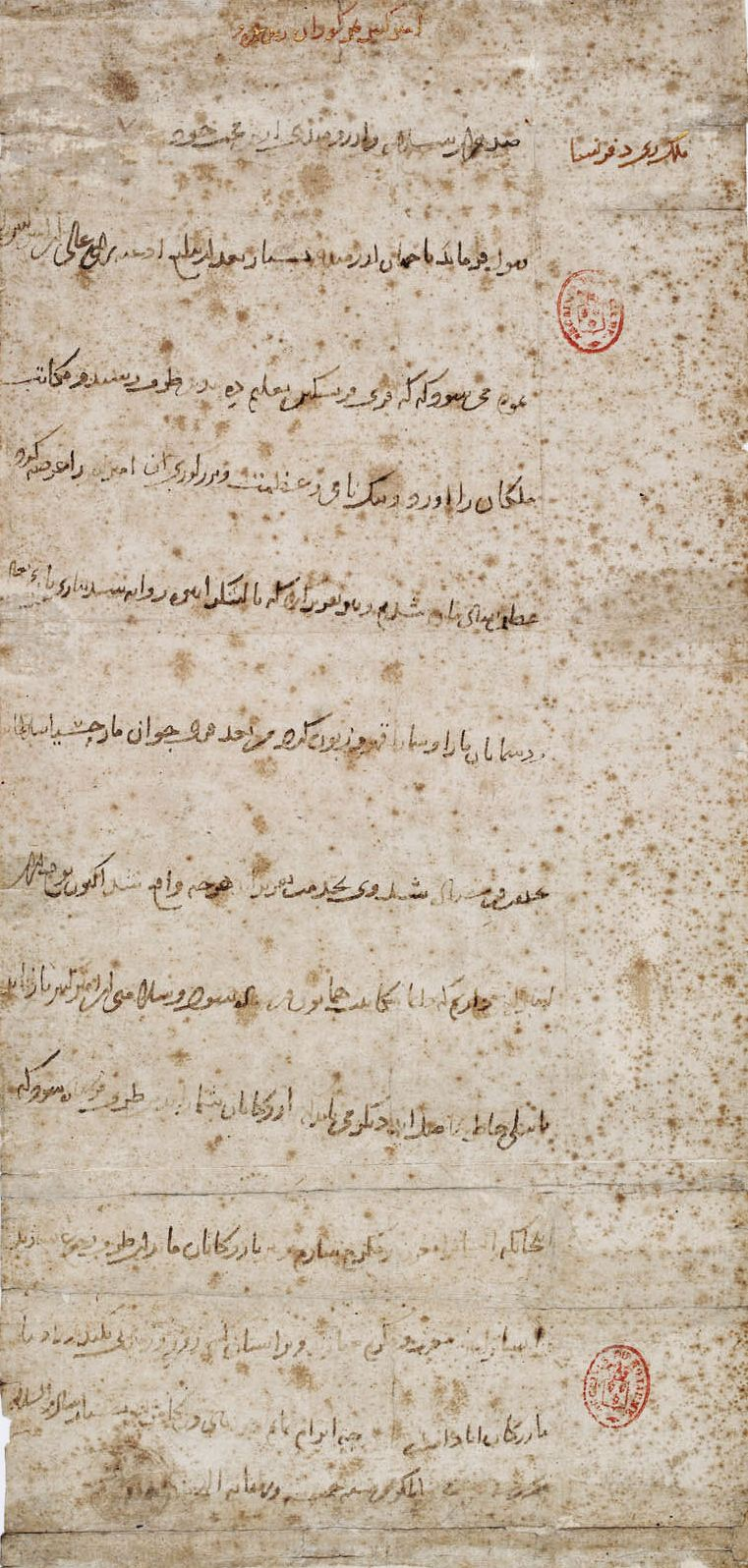
Letter of Timur to Charles VI of France, 1402.

In the early 15th century, Timur resumed relations with Europe, attempting to form an alliance against the Egyptian Mamluks and the Ottoman Empire, and engaged in communications with Charles VI of France and Henry III of Castile, but died in 1405.

=== Cultural contacts ===
In the cultural sphere, there were some Mongol elements in Western medieval art, especially in Italy, of which most surviving examples are from the 14th century, after the chance of a military alliance had faded. These included the depiction of textiles from the Mongol Empire and Mongol script in various contexts, the latter often anachronistic. Imports of textiles had a considerable influence on Italian textile design. Mongol military costume is sometimes worn by soldiers, typically those acting against Christian figures, as in martyrdoms or crucifixion scenes. These were perhaps copied from drawings made of Mongol envoys to Europe, or ones brought back from Outremer.

== Views from historians ==
Most historians describe the contacts between the Mongol Empire and the Western Europeans as a series of attempts, missed opportunities, and failed negotiations. Christopher Atwood, in the 2004 Encyclopedia of Mongolia and the Mongol Empire, summed up the relations between Western Europe and the Mongols: "Despite numerous envoys and the obvious logic of an alliance against mutual enemies, the papacy and the Crusaders never achieved the often-proposed alliance against Islam."

A few other historians argue there was an actual alliance, but do not agree on the details: Jean Richard wrote that an alliance began around 1263. Reuven Amitai stated that the closest thing to actual Mongol-Frankish military coordination was when Prince Edward of England attempted to coordinate activities with Abaga in 1271. Amitai also mentioned the other attempts towards cooperation, but said, "In none of these episodes, however, can we speak of Mongols and troops from the Frankish West being on the Syrian mainland at the same time." Timothy May described the alliance as having its peak at the Council of Lyon in 1274, but that it began to unravel in 1275 with the death of Bohemond, and May too admitted that the forces never engaged in joint operations. Alain Demurger, in his own book The Last Templar, said that an alliance was not sealed until 1300.

There also continues to be debate about whether or not an alliance would have been a wise idea, and whether the Crusaders at that point in history were even relevant to the Persian-Mongol conflict. The 20th-century historian Glenn Burger said, "The refusal of the Latin Christian states in the area to follow Hethum's example and adapt to changing conditions by allying themselves with the new Mongol empire must stand as one of the saddest of the many failures of Outremer." This was similar to the view of Steven Runciman, who argued, "Had the Mongol alliance been achieved and honestly implemented by the West, the existence of Outremer would almost certainly have been prolonged. The Mameluks would have been crippled if not destroyed; and the Ilkhanate of Persia would have survived as a power friendly to the Christians and the West". However, David Nicolle, describing the Mongols as "potential allies", said that early historians were writing from the benefit of hindsight, and that overall the major players were the Mamluks and the Mongols, with Christians just "pawns in a greater game."

== Reasons for failure ==
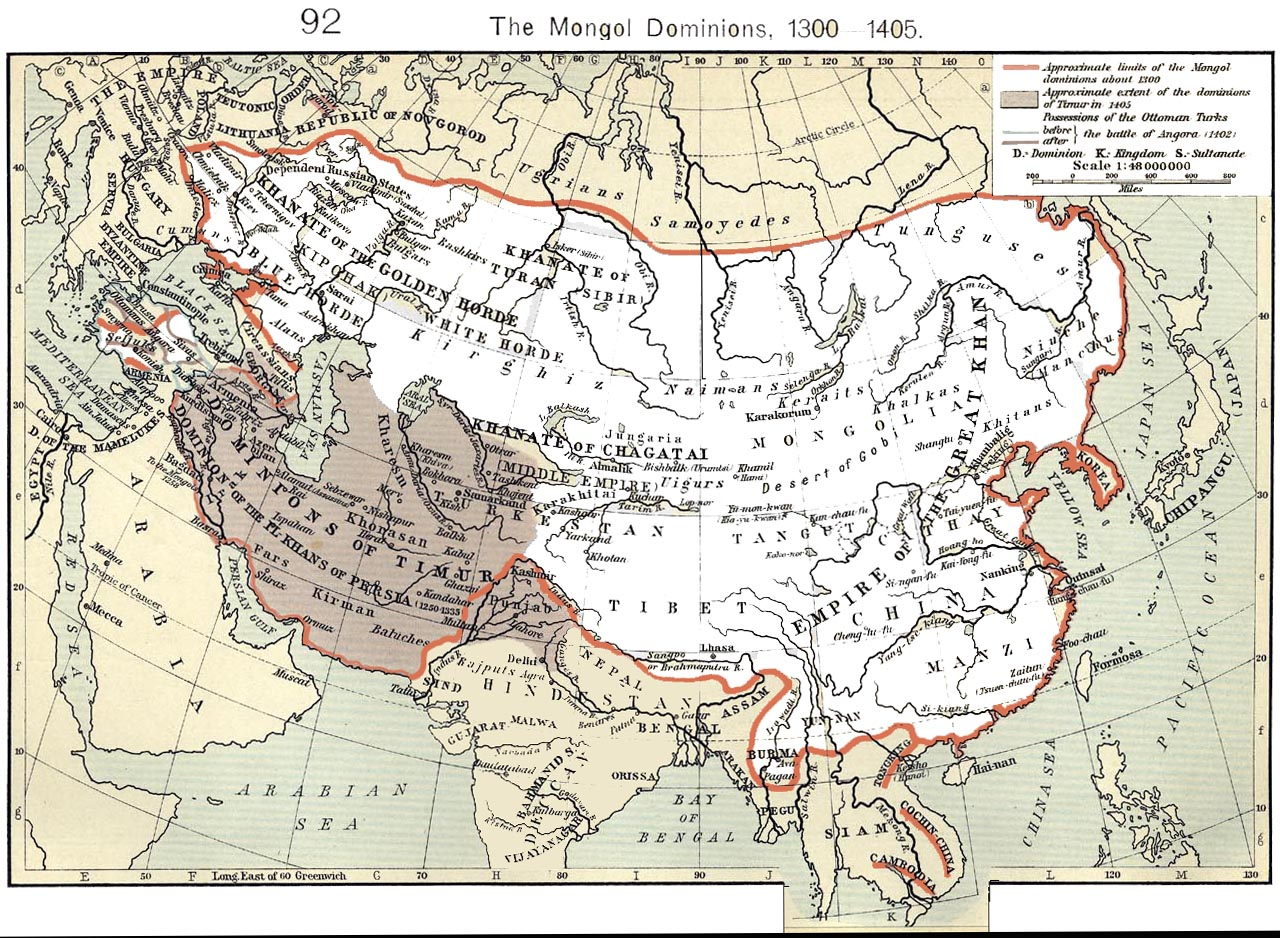
The Mongol Empire, ca. 1300. The gray area is the later Timurid empire. The geographic distance between the Ilkhanid Mongols, along with their Great Khan in Khanbalic, and the Europeans was large.

There has been much discussion among historians as to why the Franco-Mongol alliance never became a reality and why, despite all the diplomatic contacts, it stayed a chimera or fantasy. Many reasons have been proposed: one was that the Mongols at that stage in their empire were not entirely focused on expanding to the West. By the late 13th century, the Mongol leaders were several generations removed from the great Genghis Khan, and internal disruption was brewing. The original nomadic Mongols from the day of Genghis had become more settled, and had turned into administrators instead of conquerors. Battles were springing up that were Mongol against Mongol, which took troops away from the front in Syria. There was also confusion within Europe as to the differences between the Mongols of the Ilkhanate in the Holy Land, and the Mongols of the Golden Horde, who were attacking Hungary and Poland. Within the Mongol Empire, the Ilkhanids and the Golden Horde considered each other enemies, but it took time for Western observers to be able to distinguish between the different parts of the Mongol Empire. From the Mongol side, there were also concerns as to just how much clout the Franks could have brought to bear, especially as there was decreased interest in Europe in pursuing the Crusades. Court historians of Mongol Persia made no mention whatsoever of the communications between the Ilkhans and the Christian West, and barely mentioned the Franks at all. The communications were evidently not seen as important by the Mongols, and may have even been considered embarrassing. The Mongol leader Ghazan, a converted Muslim since 1295, might not have wanted to be perceived as trying to gain the assistance of infidels against his fellow Muslims in Egypt. When Mongol historians did make notes of foreign territories, the areas were usually categorized as either "enemies", "conquered", or "in rebellion". The Franks, in that context, were listed in the same category as the Egyptians, in that they were enemies to be conquered. The idea of "ally" was foreign to the Mongols.

Some European monarchs responded positively to Mongol inquiries, but became vague and evasive when asked to actually commit troops and resources. Logistics also became more complex – the Egyptian Mamluks were genuinely concerned about the threat of another wave of Crusader forces, so each time the Mamluks captured another castle or port, instead of occupying it, they systematically destroyed it so that it could never be used again. This both made it more difficult for the Crusaders to plan military operations, and increased the expense of those operations. Monarchs in Western Europe often vocally entertained the idea of going on crusade as a way of making an emotional appeal to their subjects, but would ultimately take years to prepare, sometimes never actually left for Outremer. Internal wars in Europe, such as the War of the Vespers, were also distracting attention, and making it less likely for European nobles to want to commit their military to the Crusades, when they were more needed at home.

The Europeans were also concerned about the long-term goals of the Mongols. Early Mongol diplomacy had been not a simple offer of cooperation, but straightforward demands for submission. It was only in later communications that Mongol diplomats started to adopt a more conciliatory tone; but they still used language that implied more command than entreaty. Even the Armenian historian Hayton of Corycus, the most enthusiastic advocate of Western-Mongol collaboration, freely admitted that the Mongol leadership was not inclined to listen to European advice. His recommendation was that even if working together, European armies and Mongol armies should avoid contact because of Mongol arrogance. European leaders were aware that the Mongols would not have been content to stop at the Holy Land, but were on a clear quest for world domination. If the Mongols had achieved a successful alliance with the West and destroyed the Mamluk Sultanate, they certainly would have eventually turned upon the Franks of Cyprus and the Byzantines. They also would have surely conquered Egypt, from which they could have continued an advance into Africa, where no strong state could have stood in their way until Morocco and the Islamic caliphates in the Maghreb.

Lastly, there was not much support among the general populace in Europe for a Mongol alliance. Writers in Europe were creating "recovery" literature with their ideas about how best to recover the Holy Land, but few mentioned the Mongols as a genuine possibility. In 1306, when Pope Clement V asked the leaders of the military orders, Jacques de Molay and Fulk de Villaret, to present their proposals for how the Crusades should proceed, neither of them factored in any kind of a Mongol alliance. A few later proposals talked briefly about the Mongols as being a force that could invade Syria and keep the Mamluks distracted, but not one that could be counted on for cooperation.

== See also ==
- France-Mongolia relations
