= Veritatis =

Veritatis may refer to:

- Veritatis Splendor, an encyclical by Pope John Paul II
- Viam agnoscere veritatis (disambiguation), a series of papal communications written by Pope Innocent IV to the Mongols
