= Simon of Saint-Quentin =

13th-century Dominican friar and diplomat

Simon of Saint-Quentin (fl. 1245-48) was a Dominican friar and diplomat who accompanied Ascelin of Lombardia on an embassy which Pope Innocent IV sent to the Mongols in 1245. Simon’s account of the mission, in its original form, is lost; but a large section has been preserved in Vincent of Beauvais’ Speculum Historiale, where nineteen chapters are expressly said to be ex libello fratris Simonis. The embassy of Ascelin and Simon proceeded to the camp of Baiju at Sitiens in Armenia, lying between the Aras River and Lake Sevan, fifty-nine days' journey from Acre.

The papal letters were translated into Persian, and thence into Mongolian, and so presented to Baiju; but the Tatars were greatly irritated by the haughtiness of the Dominicans, who implied that the pope was superior even to the Great Khan, and offered no presents, refused the customary reverences before Baiju, declined to go on to the imperial court, and made unseasonable attempts to convert their hosts. The Frankish visitors were accordingly lodged and treated with contempt: for nine weeks (June and July 1247) all answer to their letters was refused. Thrice Baiju even ordered their death. At last, on July 25, 1247, they were dismissed with the Noyan's reply, dated July 20. This reply complained of the high words of the Latin envoys, and commanded the pope to come in person and submit to the Master of all the Earth (the Mongol emperor).

The mission thus ended in complete failure; but, except for Carpini's, it was the earliest Catholic embassy which reached any Mongol court, and its information must have been valuable. It performed something at least of what should have been (but apparently was not) done by Lawrence of Portugal, who was commissioned as papal envoy to the Mongols of the south-west at the same time that Carpini was accredited to those of the north (1245).

See Vincent of Beauvais, Speculum historiale, book xxxii. (sometimes quoted as xxxi.), chaps. 26-29, 32, 34, 40-52, (cf. pp. 453 A-454 B in the Venice edition of 1591); besides these, several other chapters of the Speculum historiale probably contain material derived from Simon, e.g. bk. xxxi. (otherwise xxx.), chaps. 3, 4, 7, 8, 13, 32; and bk. xxx. (otherwise xxix.), chaps. 69, 71, 74-75, 78, 80.

== Works ==
Simon of Saint-Quentin: History of the Tartars Those sections of Simon’s text that were included in Vincent of Beauvais’ Speculum historiale translated into English and annotated by Stephen Pow, Tamás Kiss, Anna Romsics, Flora Ghazaryan. Published online in 2019; bilingual: English, Latin.

== See also ==
- Exploration of Asia
