= Viam agnoscere veritatis =

Viam agnoscere veritatis or Viam cognoscere veritatis ("That they know the way of truth"), refers to papal communications from Pope Innocent IV to the Mongols:

- Dei patris immensa, a letter sent March 5, 1245, carried by Lawrence of Portugal
- Cum non solum, a letter sent March 13, 1245, carried by John of Plano Carpini
- Viam agnoscere veritatis (1248), a letter sent November 1248, in reply to a Mongol communication, and probably carried by Mongol ambassadors Aybeg and Sarkis
