= Dei patris immensa =

1245 letter written by Pope Innocent IV

Dei patris immensa was a letter written by Pope Innocent IV to the Mongols (the Pope also wrote other letters to the Mongols, which are known as Cum non solum and Viam agnoscere veritatis). It was written on March 5, 1245, was an exposition of the Christian faith, and urged Mongols to accept baptism. It was intended to be carried by the Franciscan friar and papal envoy Laurentius of Portugal. However, nothing more is known about Laurentius' embassy, and it is possible that he never actually left.

== Naming ==
Ecclesiastical letters are generally named by modern scholars, according to their incipit, or beginning. This letter starts with similar language to the two other letters, Viam agnoscere veritatis and Cum non solum. The letter starts, "...regi et populo Tartarorum viam agnoscere veritatis. Dei patris inmensa benignitas humani generis casum, quod primi hominis culpa corruerat, ineffabili respiciens pietate..." It has been referred to by different names, such as "Dei patris inmensa", "Dei patris immensa", and "Verbum agnoscere" by different scholars, choosing different parts of the incipit to refer to it.

== See also ==
- Viam agnoscere veritatis (disambiguation)
