= Aïbeg and Serkis =

Aïbeg and Serkis, also Aibeg and Sergis or Aïbäg and Särgis, were two ambassadors sent by the Mongol ruler Baichu to Pope Innocent IV in 1247–1248. They were the first Mongol envoys to Europe.

Aïbeg ("Moon Prince") is thought to have been a Turcophone Christian, possibly Uighur, and Sergis (from the Roman and later Christian name "Sergius" or "Sarkis") a Nestorian Christian, probably Assyrian. Both were sent by Baichu, to accompany the 1245 embassy of the Dominican Ascelin of Lombardia back to Lyon, France, where the Pope was residing at the time. They stayed there for about a year.

Aïbeg and Serkis met with Innocent IV in 1248, and remitted to him a rather vexing letter from Baichu, expressing his difficulty in understanding the Pope's message, and asking for his submission:

"By the strength of the Khagan, the word of Prince Baichu. You Pope, know that your messengers came to visit us and brought to us your letters. They made strange discourses to us, and we do not know if you ordered them to utter these words, and if they did so of their own accord..."

— Letter from Baichu to Pope Innocent IV, 1248

As a reply to the letter from Baiju, Innocent IV remitted to the envoys the letter known as Viam agnoscere veritatis. According to historian Kenneth Setton, it "stated that Innocent IV had acted out of a sense of duty to let the true religion be known to the Mongols, and that he regretted the Mongols' perseverance in their errors and adjured them to cease their menaces." The Pope appealed to the Mongols to stop their killing of Christians, while indicating no further interest in continuing the dialogue.

Aïbeg and Serkis stayed at Lyon for about a year, before returning to the Mongol realm on November 22, 1248.

== See also ==
- Franco-Mongol alliance
