= Ascelin of Lombardy =

Dominican friar; explorer, & diplomat

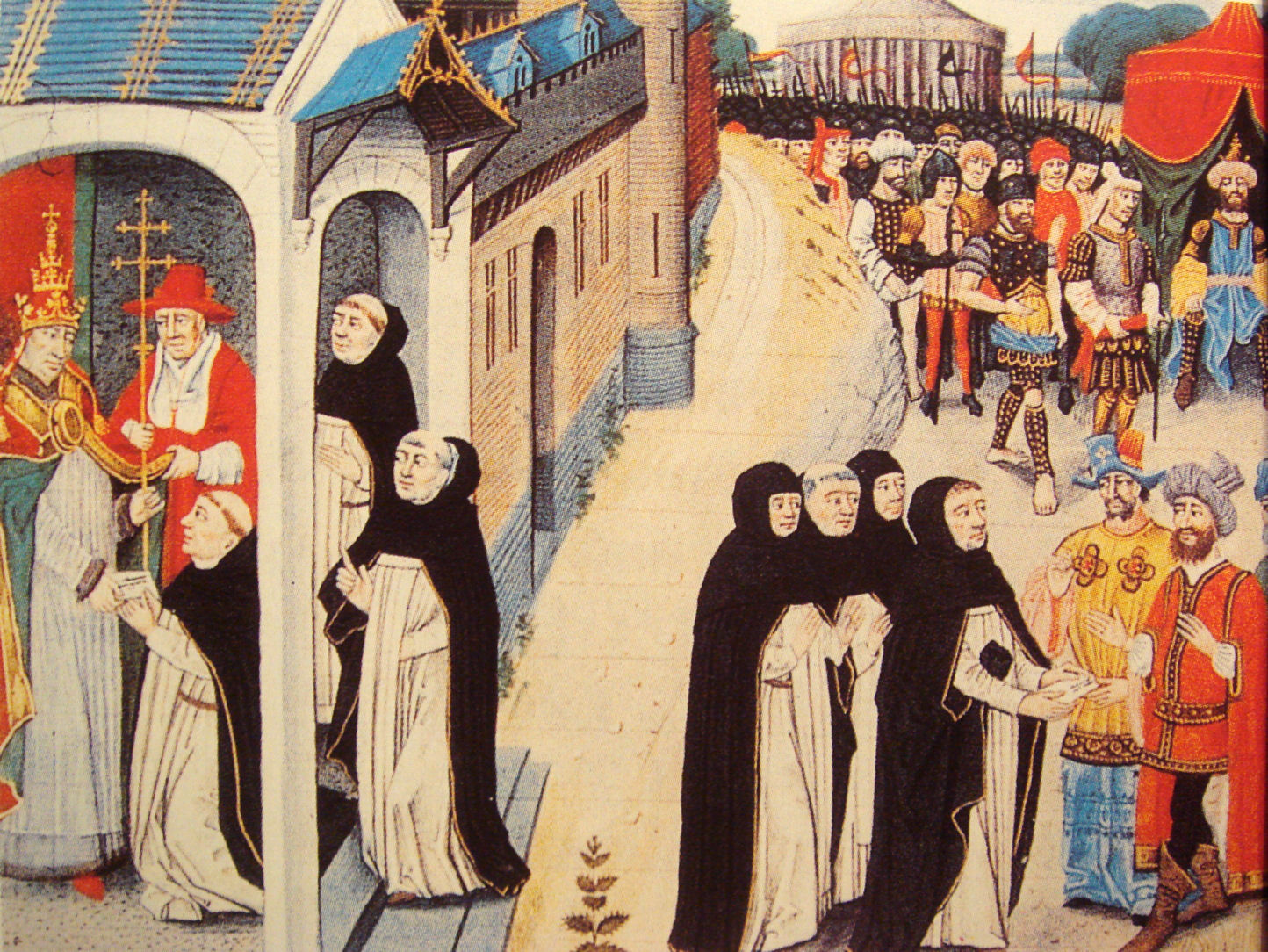
Ascelin of Lombardy receiving a letter from Pope Innocent IV, and remitting it to the Mongol general Baiju. From an illustrated copy of David Aubert's Chronique des empereurs.

Ascelin of Lombardy, also known as Nicolas Ascelin or Ascelin of Cremona, was a 13th-century Dominican friar whom Pope Innocent IV sent as an envoy to the Mongols in March 1245. Ascelin met with the Mongol ruler Baiju, and then returned to Europe with a message and Mongol envoys in 1248.

Prior to the First Council of Lyon in March 1245, Innocent IV dispatched four embassies to the Mongols, one of which included Ascelin. He was accompanied by Simon of St Quentin, who wrote the account of the mission in his Historia Tartarorum; two unknown men, Alberic and Alexander; and the Dominican friar Guichard of Cremone, who had already been stationed for 5 years in Tiflis. Ascelin met with the Mongol ruler Baiju at his camp in the valley of the Arax River in 1247.

Ascelin is generally described as stubborn and inflexible in character. He did not bring gifts to the Mongols, and refused to show them respect by genuflection unless they would accept baptism, thereby angering them to a considerable extent. The Mongols replied indignantly "that they couldn’t care about becoming Christians and dogs as they were, that the Pope was a dog, and that they were dogs themselves." Ascelin reportedly barely escaped death, owing only to the respect which the Mongols traditionally granted to envoys.

During his mission, he also met with Muslim princes such as the uncle of the prince of Aleppo, and the brother of the prince of Mossul, who were on their way to pay their own respects to the Khan. The princes invited Ascelin to travel further east with them to meet the Great Khan in Karakorum, Mongolia, but he declined the offer.

Ascelin carried Baiju's reply, a missive which demanded the submission of the Pope, back to Europe. He was accompanied by two Mongolian envoys, Aïbeg and Serkis, who traveled with him back to Lyon and met with Innocent in 1248. In response, the pope issued the papal bull Viam agnoscere veritatis, which appealed to the Mongols that they should stop killing Christians. The envoys returned to their realm with the pope's letter on November 22, 1248.

== See also ==
- André de Longjumeau
- Giovanni da Pian del Carpine
- Lawrence of Portugal
