= Lawrence of Portugal =

Franciscan friar and envoy sent to the Mongols in 1245

Lawrence of Portugal was a Franciscan friar and an envoy sent by Pope Innocent IV to the Mongols in 1245.

A letter survives in the Register of Innocent IV, dating Lawrence's departure from Lyon to 5 March 1245. The letter, published in Monumenta Germaniae Historica and usually referred to as Dei patris immensa, suggests that his mission was primarily religious in character. Lawrence was to have approached the Mongols from the Levant. Nothing is known of his fate, and the possibility remains that he never left.

A second Franciscan mission, led by Giovanni da Pian del Carpine, left Lyon on 16 April 1245 and arrived in the Mongol capital of Karakorum more than a year later.

== See also ==
- André de Longjumeau
- Ascelin of Lombardia
- Simon of St Quentin
