= Cum non solum =

1245 letter written by Pope Innocent IV

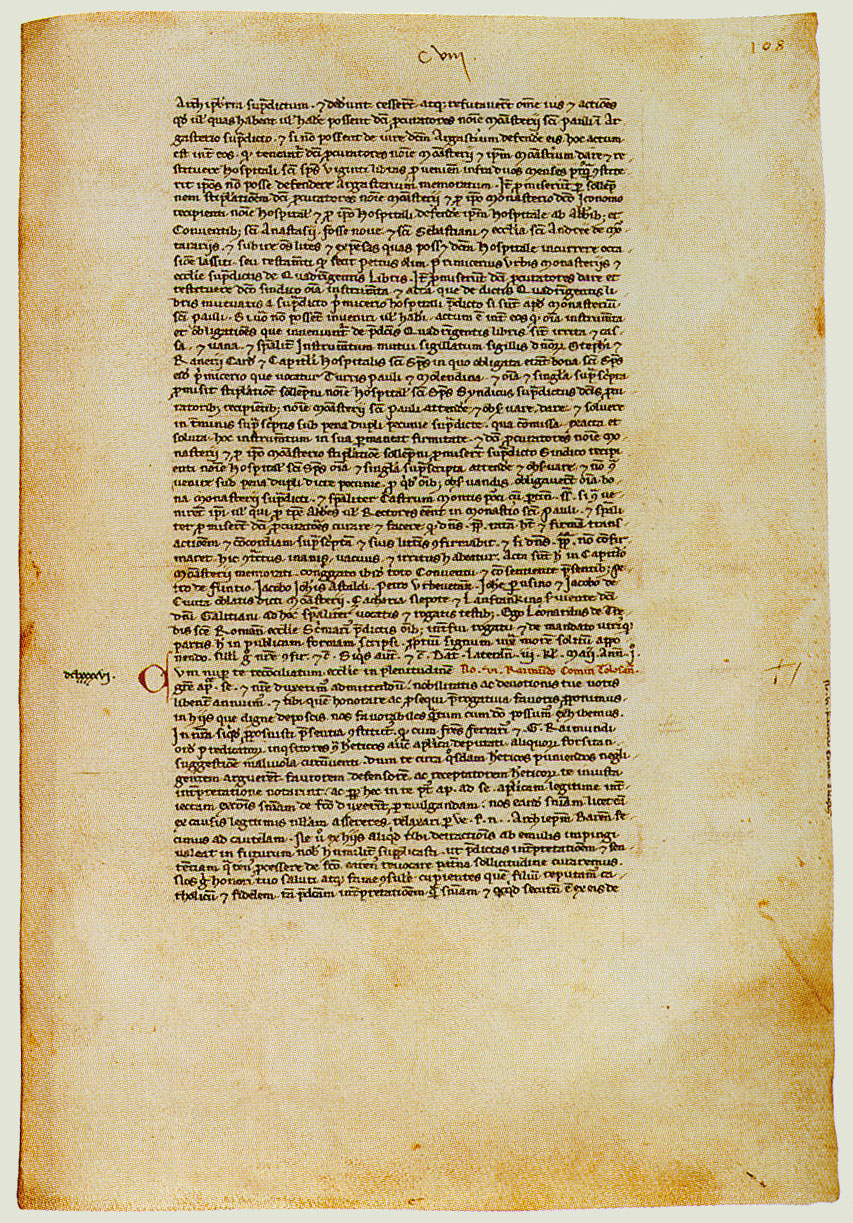
Letter written by Pope Innocent IV

Cum non solum was a letter written by Pope Innocent IV to the Mongols on March 13, 1245. In it, Pope Innocent appeals to the Mongols to desist from attacking Christians and other nations, and inquires as to the Mongols' future intentions. Innocent also expresses a desire for peace (possibly unaware that in the Mongol vocabulary, "peace" is a synonym for "subjection").

This message was carried by the Franciscan John of Plano Carpini, who successfully reached the Mongol capital of Karakorum, where he attended the election of the new Khan Güyük on August 24, 1246.

== Naming ==
Papal letters are generally named by modern scholars, according to their incipit, or beginning. This letter, Cum non solum ("And not only") starts with similar language to the two other letters, Viam agnoscere veritatis ("The way to recognize the truth") and Dei patris immensa ("God the Father is immense"). The letter starts, "...regi et populo Tartarorum viam agnoscere veritatis. Cum non solum homines verum etiam animalia irrationalia nec non ipsa mundialis elementa machine quadam nativi federis..."

== Reply from Güyük Khan to Pope Innocent IV ==
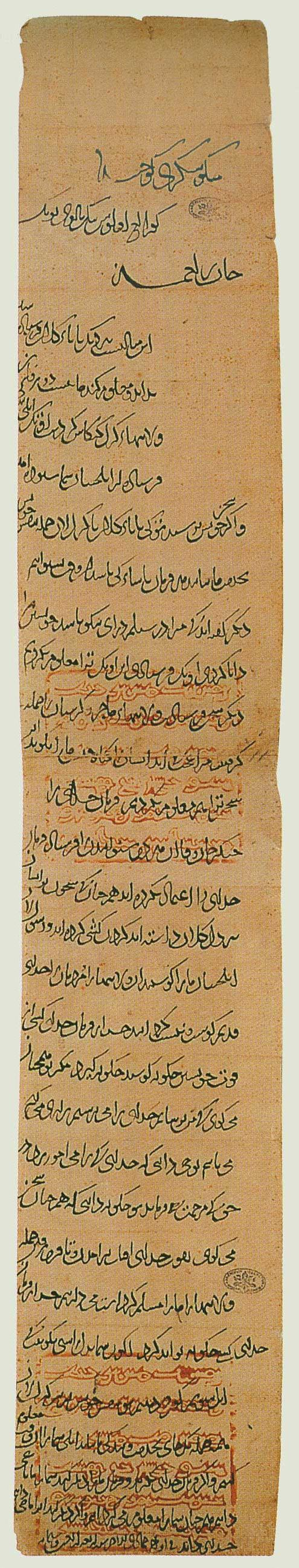
Güyük Khan demanding Pope Innocent IV's submission.

In 1246, Güyük Khan, ruler of the Mongol Empire, sent a letter in reply to Pope Innocent IV, demanding his submission. The letter was in Persian, and Turkic which was used for the preamble.

The preamble reads as follows:

M(ä)ngü t(ä)ngri küč(ü)nde
kür (u)l(u)γ ulus n(u)ng Taluï nung
xan y(a)rl(ï)γ(ï)m(ï)z.

Translation:

"We, by the power of the eternal heaven, Khan of the great Ulus, Our command."

The letter sent by Güyük, who had little understanding of faraway Europe or the Pope's significance in it, other than that the Pope was sending a message from an area that the Mongols had not yet conquered, demanded the Pope's submission, and a visit from the rulers of the West in homage to Mongol power:

"You must say with a sincere heart: "We will be your subjects; we will give you our strength". You must in person come with your kings, all together, without exception, to render us service and pay us homage. Only then will we acknowledge your submission. And if you do not follow the order of God, and go against our orders, we will know you as our enemy."

— Letter from Güyük to Pope Innocent IV, 1246.

== See also ==
- Franco-Mongol alliance

== Bibliography ==
- Brand-Pierach, Sandra, Ungläubige im Kirchenrecht, Text of the letter p. 174
- Dawson, Christopher (1980), Mission to Asia, University of Toronto Press in association with the Medieval Academy of America, ISBN 0-8020-6436-1, English translation of text of the letter
- Jackson, Peter (2005), The Mongols and the West, 1221-1410, Pearson Education, ISBN 0-582-36896-0
- Roux, Jean-Paul, Histoire de l'Empire Mongol, 1993, Fayard, ISBN 2-213-03164-9
- Setton, Kenneth Meyer, A History of the Crusades
- MGH Epp. Saec. XIII, Volume 2, pp. 72–75 (original source documents)
- Grousset, René, Histoire des Croisades, III, Tempus, 2006 edition, ISBN 2-262-02569-X
- Rachewiltz, I, Papal Envoys to the Great Khans, Stanford University Press, 1971.
- Runciman, Steven, History of the Crusades, III, Penguin Books, 2002 edition, ISBN 0-14-013705-X
