= Viam agnoscere veritatis (1248) =

Letter from Pope Innocent IV to convert the Mongols

Viam agnoscere veritatis is the name of a letter written by Pope Innocent IV to the Mongols. It was written on November 22, 1248, and was Pope Innocent's reply to a message from Mongol commander Baiju. Innocent IV had previously sent two letters to the Mongols in 1245, Cum non solum and Dei patris immensa.

The letter was probably transmitted from the Pope via Mongol envoys Aïbeg and Serkis, was dated November 22, 1248, and was the Pope's reply to a letter from Baiju. Modern scholars have generally named papal letters according to their incipit, or beginning. Some historians refer to this letter as "Viam agnoscere veritatis" and some as "Viam cognoscere veritatis" (both "agnoscere" and "cognoscere" are Latin for "to know"). According to historian Denis Sinor, the letter "stated that Innocent IV had acted out of a sense of duty to let the true religion be known to the Mongols, and that he regretted the Mongols' perseverance in their errors and adjured them to cease their menaces."

"Better that you humble yourself before [Christ], face to face, and recognize His great forbearance, Who for so long has endured your destructive actions: that in waiting obligingly, you may be turned from errors to truth, and be able to fear Him, lest He provoked for too long a time should threaten you with the lash of His anger, since you do not recognize His omnipotence."

— Excerpt of letter from Pope Innocent IV to Baiju, 1248.
