= Pope Innocent IV =

Head of the Catholic Church from 1243 to 1254

- Bishop of Rome
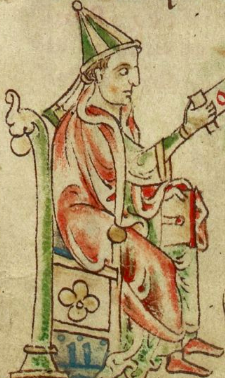
- Innocent IV excommunicating emperor Frederick II at the Council of Lyon, 13th century
- Church: Catholic Church
- Papacy began: 25 June 1243
- Papacy ended: 7 December 1254
- Predecessor: Celestine IV
- Successor: Alexander IV
- Previous post: Cardinal-Priest of San Lorenzo in Lucina (1227–1243)

Orders
- Consecration: 28 June 1243
- Created cardinal: 18 September 1227 by Gregory IX

Personal details
- Born: Sinibaldo Fieschi c. 1195 Genoa or Manarola, Republic of Genoa
- Died: 7 December 1254 (aged 58–59) Naples, Kingdom of Sicily
- Coat of arms

Pope Innocent IV (Latin: Innocentius IV; c. 1195 – 7 December 1254), born Sinibaldo Fieschi, was head of the Catholic Church and ruler of the Papal States from 25 June 1243 to his death in 1254.

Fieschi was born in Genoa and studied at the universities of Parma and Bologna. He was considered in his own day and by posterity as a fine canonist. On the strength of this reputation, he was called to the Roman Curia by Pope Honorius III. Pope Gregory IX made him a cardinal and appointed him governor of the Ancona in 1235. Fieschi was elected pope in 1243 and took the name Innocent IV. He inherited an ongoing dispute over lands seized by the Holy Roman Emperor, and the following year he traveled to France to escape imperial plots against him in Rome. He returned to Rome in 1250 after the death of the Emperor Frederick II.

On 15 May 1252 he promulgated the bull Ad extirpanda authorizing torture against heretics, equated with ordinary criminals.

== Early life ==
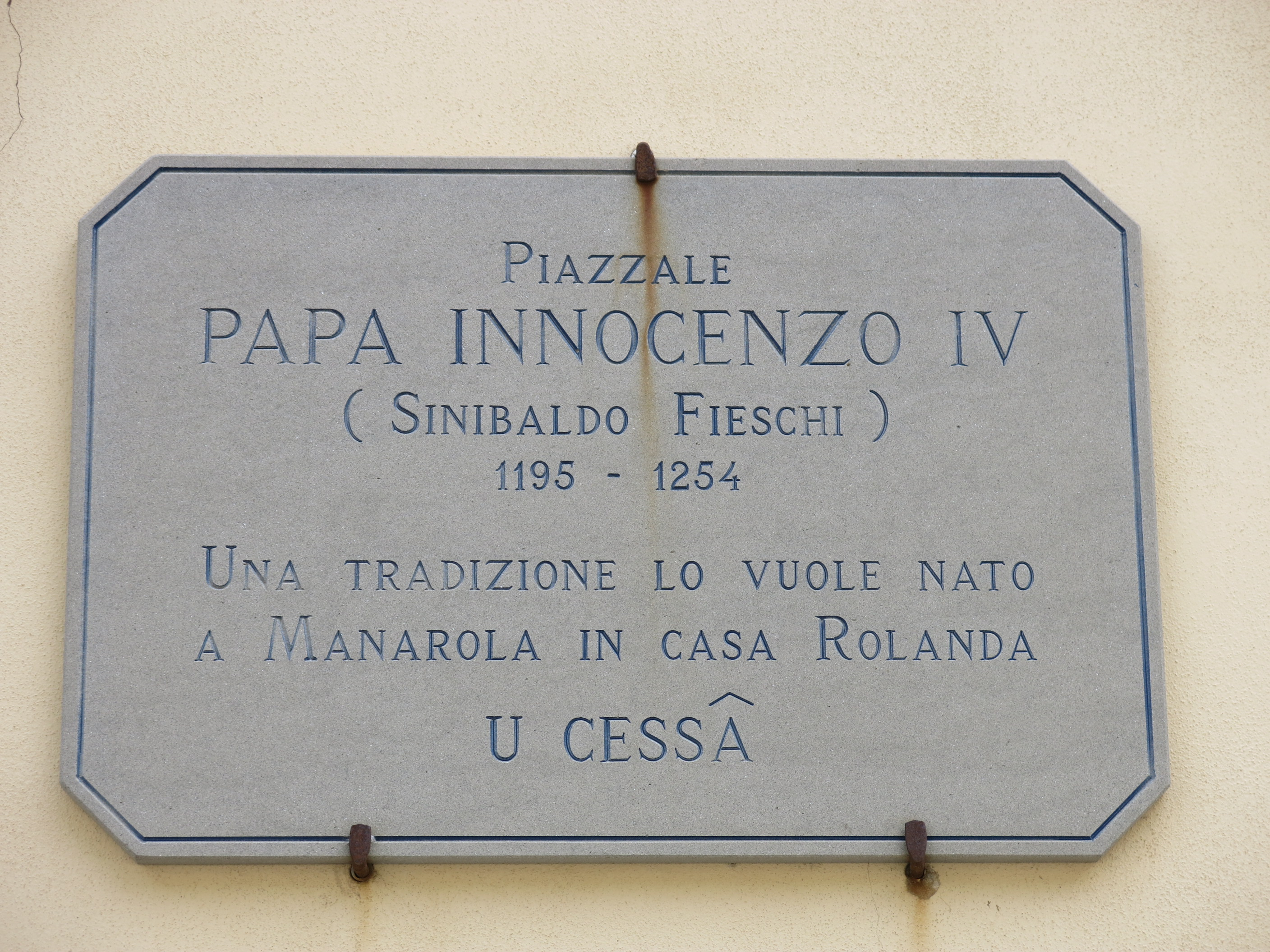
Square in Manarola named for Innocent IV

Born in Genoa (although some sources say Manarola) in an unknown year, Sinibaldo was the son of Beatrice Grillo and Ugo Fieschi, Count of Lavagna. The Fieschi were a noble merchant family of Liguria. Sinibaldo received his education at the universities of Parma and Bologna and may have taught canon law, for a time, at Bologna. The fact is disputed, though, as others pointed out, there is no documentary evidence of his teaching position. From 1216 to 1227 he was a canon of the Cathedral of Parma. He was considered one of the best canonists of his time, He wrote the Apparatus in quinque libros decretalium, a commentary on papal decrees. He was called to serve Pope Honorius III in the Roman Curia where he rapidly rose through the hierarchy. He was Auditor causarum, from 11 November 1226 to 30 May 1227. He was then quickly promoted to the office of Vice-Chancellor of the Holy Roman Church (from 31 May to 23 September 1227), though he retained the office and the title for a time after he was named Cardinal.

== Cardinal ==
While vice-Chancellor, Fieschi was soon created Cardinal-Priest of San Lorenzo in Lucina on 18 September 1227 by Pope Gregory IX (1227–1241). He later served as papal governor of the March of Ancona, from 17 October 1235 until 1240.

Sources from the 17th century onwards reported that he became Bishop of Albenga in 1235, but later sources disputed this claim. There is no attestation of this in any of the contemporary sources while there is evidence that the see of Albenga was occupied by a certain Bishop Simon from 1230 until 1255.

Innocent's immediate predecessor was Pope Celestine IV, elected on 25 October 1241, whose reign lasted only fifteen days. The events of Innocent IV's pontificate are therefore inextricably linked to the policies dominating the reigns of popes Innocent III, Honorius III and Gregory IX.

Gregory IX had demanded the return of lands belonging to the Papal States which had been seized by the Emperor Frederick II. The Pope had called a general council to seek the deposing of the emperor with the support of Europe's Church leaders. However, hoping to intimidate the Curia, Frederick had seized two cardinals traveling to the council. Being incarcerated, the two missed the conclave which quickly elected Celestine IV. The conclave reconvened after Celestine's death split into factions supporting contrasting policies about how to treat the Emperor.

== New pope, same emperor ==
After a year and a half of contentious debate and coercion, the papal conclave finally reached a unanimous decision. The choice fell upon Cardinal Sinibaldo de' Fieschi, who very reluctantly accepted election as Pope on 25 June 1243, taking the name of Innocent IV. As a cardinal, Sinibaldo had been on friendly terms with Frederick, even after the latter's excommunication. The Emperor greatly admired the cardinal's wisdom, having enjoyed discussions with him from time to time.

Following the election, the witty Frederick remarked that he had lost the friendship of a cardinal but gained the enmity of a pope.

His jest notwithstanding, Frederick's letter to the new pontiff was respectful, offering congratulations to the new Pope and wishing him success. It also expressed hope for an amicable settlement of the differences between the empire and the papacy. Negotiations began shortly afterwards but were not successful. Innocent refused to back down from his demands and Frederick refused to acquiesce. The dispute continued mostly about the restitution of Lombardy to the Patrimony of St Peter.

The Emperor's machinations aroused a good deal of anti-papal feelings in Italy, particularly in the Papal States, and imperial agents encouraged plots against papal rule. Realizing he was becoming increasingly unsafe in Rome, Innocent IV secretly and hurriedly withdrew, fleeing Rome on 7 June 1244. Traveling in disguise, he made his way to Sutri and then to the port of Civitavecchia, and from there to Genoa, his birthplace, where he arrived on 7 July. On 5 October, he fled from there to France, where he was joyously welcomed. Making his way to Lyon, where he arrived on 29 November 1244, Innocent was greeted cordially by the magistrates of the city.

Innocent was now safe and out of the reach of Frederick II. In a sermon on 27 December 1244, he summoned as many bishops as could get to Lyon (140 bishops eventually came) to attend what became the 13th General (Ecumenical) Council of the Church, the first to be held in Lyon. The bishops met for three public sessions: 28 June, 5 July, and 17 July 1245. Their principal purpose was to win over the Emperor Frederick II.

== First Council of Lyon ==
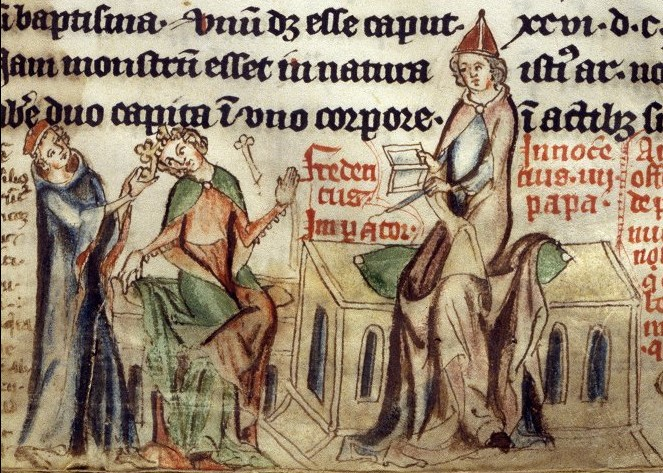
14th-century miniature depicting the excommunication of Emperor Frederick II by Pope Innocent IV

The First Council of Lyon of 1245 had the fewest participants of any previous General Council. However, three patriarchs and the Latin emperor of Constantinople attended, along with about 150 bishops, most of them prelates from France and Spain. They came quickly, and Innocent could rely on their help. Bishops from the rest of Europe outside Spain and France feared retribution from Frederick, while many other bishops were prevented from attending either by the invasions of the Mongols (Tartars) in the Far East or Muslim incursions in the Middle East. The bishop of Belgorod in Russia, Peter, attended and provided information on the Mongols via the Tractatus de ortu Tartarorum.

During the session, Frederick II's position was defended by Taddeo of Suessa, who renewed in his master's name all the promises made before, but refused to give the guarantees the pope demanded. The council ended on 17 July with the fathers solemnly deposing and excommunicating the Emperor, while absolving all his subjects from their allegiance.

== After Lyon ==
The council's acts inflamed the political conflict across Europe. The tension subsided only with Frederick's death in December 1250: this removed the threat to Innocent's life and allowed his return to Italy. He departed Lyon on 19 April 1251 and arrived in Genoa on 18 May. On 1 July, he was in Milan, accompanied by only three cardinals and the Latin Patriarch of Constantinople. He stayed there until mid-September, when he began an inspection tour of Lombardy, heading for Bologna. On 5 November he reached Perugia. From 1251 to 1253 the Pope stayed at Perugia until it was safe for him to bring the papal court back to Rome. He finally saw Rome again in the first week of October 1253. He left Rome on 27 April 1254, for Assisi and then Anagni. He immediately dealt with the succession to the possessions of Frederick II, both as German Emperor and as King of Sicily. In both instances, Innocent continued Pope Gregory IX's policy of opposition to the Hohenstaufen, supporting whatever opposing party could be found. This policy embroiled Italy in one conflict after another for the next three decades. Innocent IV himself, following the papal army which was seeking to destroy Frederick's son Manfred, died in Naples on 7 December 1254.

While in Perugia, on 15 May 1252, Innocent IV issued the papal bull Ad extirpanda, composed of thirty-eight 'laws'. He advised civil authorities in Italy to treat heretics as criminals, and authorized torture as long as it was done "without killing them or breaking their arms or legs" to compel disclosures, "as thieves and robbers of material goods are made to accuse their accomplices and confess the crimes they have committed."

Innocent IV (1243–1254) was probably the first pope who used personal arms.

== Ruler of princes and kings ==
As Innocent III had before him, Innocent IV saw himself as the Vicar of Christ, whose power was above earthly kings. Innocent, therefore, had no objection to intervening in purely secular matters. He appointed Afonso III administrator of Portugal, and lent his protection to Ottokar, the son of the King of Bohemia. The Pope even sided with King Henry III against both nobles and bishops of England, despite the king's harassment of Edmund Rich, the Archbishop of Canterbury and Primate of All England, and the royal policy of having the income of a vacant bishopric or benefice delivered to the royal coffers, rather than handed over to a papal Administrator (usually a member of the Curia) or a Papal collector of revenue, or delivered directly to the Pope.

In the case of the Mongols, too, Innocent maintained that he, as Vicar of Christ, could make non-Christians accept his dominion and even exact punishment should they violate the non-God centred commands of the Ten Commandments. This policy was held more in theory than in practice and was eventually repudiated centuries later.

== Northern Crusades ==
Shortly after Innocent IV's election to the papacy, the Teutonic Order sought his consent for the suppression of the Prussian rebellion and for their struggle against the Lithuanians. In response the Pope issued on 23 September 1243 the papal bull Qui iustis causis, authorizing crusades in Livonia and Prussia. The bull was reissued by Innocent and his successors in October 1243, March 1256, August 1256 and August 1257.

== Vicar of Christ ==
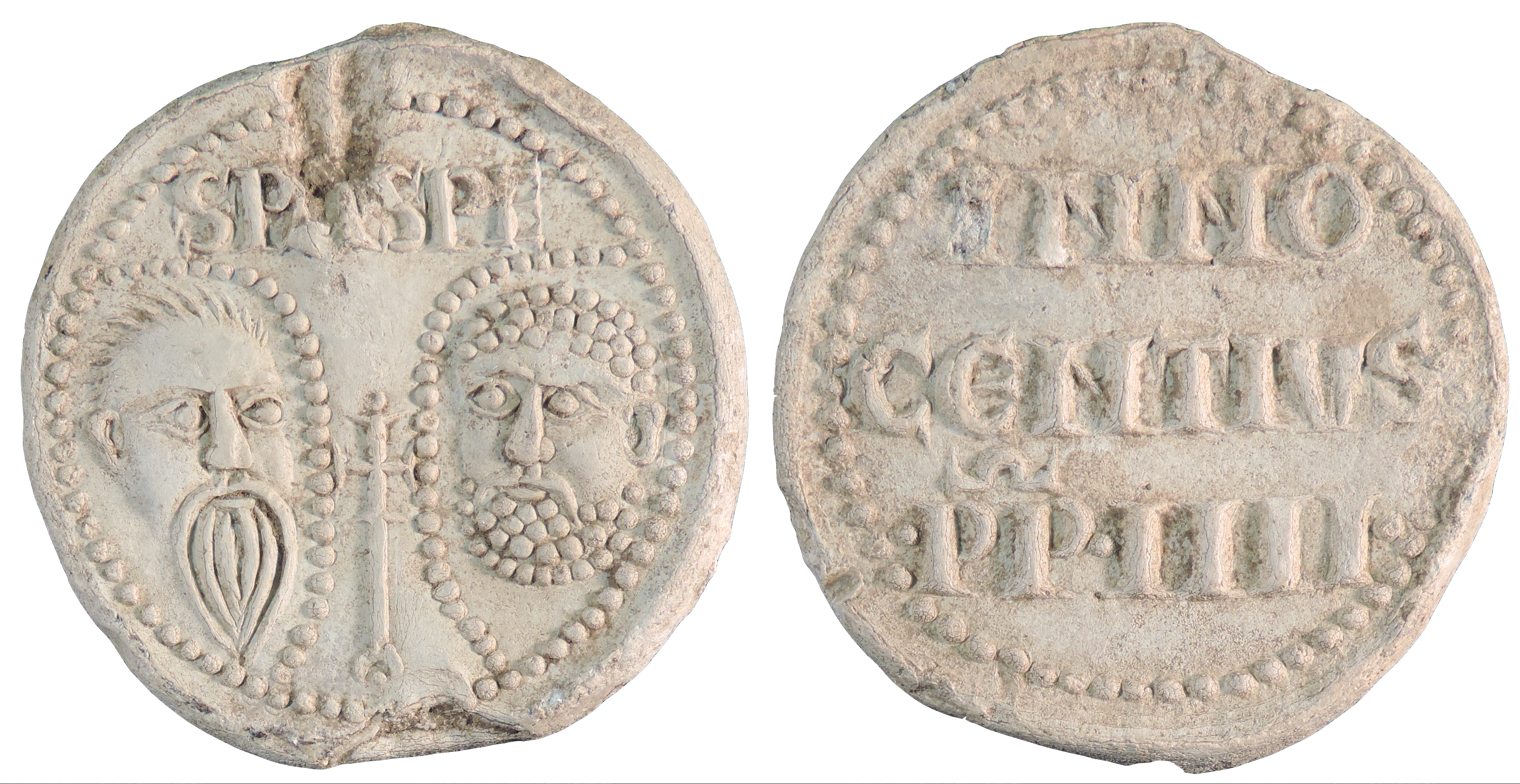
Papal bulla of Innocent IV

The papal preoccupation with imperial matters and secular princes caused other matters to suffer. On the one hand, the internal governance of the Papal States was neglected. Taxation increased in proportion to the discontent of the inhabitants. On the other hand, the spiritual condition of the Church raised concerns. Innocent attempted to give attention to the latter through a number of interventions.

=== Canonizations ===
In 1246 Edmund Rich, former Archbishop of Canterbury (died 1240), was declared a saint. In 1250 Innocent similarly proclaimed the pious Queen Margaret (died 1093), wife of King Malcolm III of Scotland, a saint. The Dominican priest Peter of Verona, martyred by Albigensian heretics in 1252, was canonized, as was Stanislaus of Szczepanów, the Polish Archbishop of Cracow, both in 1253.

=== The new Orders ===
In August 1253, after much worry about the order's insistence on absolute poverty, Innocent finally approved the rule of the Second Order of the Franciscans, the Poor Clares nuns, founded by St. Clare of Assisi, the friend of St. Francis.

=== The concept of Persona ficta ===
Innocent IV is often credited with helping to create the idea of legal personality, persona ficta as it was originally written, which has led to the idea of corporate personhood. At the time, this allowed monasteries, universities and other bodies to act as a single legal entity, facilitating continuity in their corporate existence. Monks and friars pledged individually to poverty could be part nonetheless of an organization that could own infrastructure. Such institutions, as "fictive persons", could not be excommunicated or considered guilty of delict, that is, negligence to action that is not contractually required. This meant that punishment of individuals within an organization would reflect less on the organization itself than if the person running such an organization was said to own it rather than be a constituent of it, and hence the concept was meant to provide institutional stability.

== Compromise on the Talmud ==
Possibly prompted by the persistence of heretical movements such as the Albigensians, an earlier pope, Gregory IX (1227–1241), had issued letters on 9 June 1239, ordering all the bishops of France to confiscate all Talmuds in the possession of the Jews. Agents were to raid each synagogue on the first Saturday of Lent 1240, and seize the books, placing them in the custody of the Dominicans or the Franciscans. The Bishop of Paris was ordered to see to it that copies of the Pope's mandate reached all the bishops of France, England, Aragon, Navarre, Castile and León, and Portugal. On 20 June 1239, there was another letter, addressed to the Bishop of Paris, the Prior of the Dominicans and the Minister of the Franciscans, calling for the burning of all copies of the Talmud, and any obstructionists were to be visited with ecclesiastical censures. On the same day, the Pope wrote to the King of Portugal ordering him to see to it that all copies of the Talmud be seized and turned over to the Dominicans or Franciscans. On account of these letters, King Louis IX of France held a trial in Paris in 1240, which ultimately found the Talmud guilty of 35 alleged charges; 24 cartloads of copies of the Talmud were burned.

Initially, Innocent IV continued Gregory IX's policy. In a letter of 9 May 1244, he wrote to King Louis IX, ordering the Talmud and any books with Talmudic glosses to be examined by the Regent Doctors of the University of Paris, and if condemned by them, to be burned. However, an argument was presented that this policy was a negation of the Church's traditional stance of tolerance toward Judaism. On 5 July 1247, Pope Innocent wrote to the Bishops of France and of Germany to say that because both ecclesiastics and lay persons were lawlessly plundering the property of the Jews, and stating that at Eastertime they sacrificed and ate the hearts of little children, the bishops should see to it that the Jews not be attacked or molested for these or other reasons. That same year 1247, in a letter of 2 August to Louis IX, the Pope reversed his stance on the Talmud, ordering that the Talmud should be censored rather than burned. Despite opposition from figures such as Odo of Châteauroux, Cardinal Bishop of Tusculum and former Chancellor of the University of Paris, Innocent IV's policy was nonetheless continued by subsequent popes.

== Relations with the Jews ==
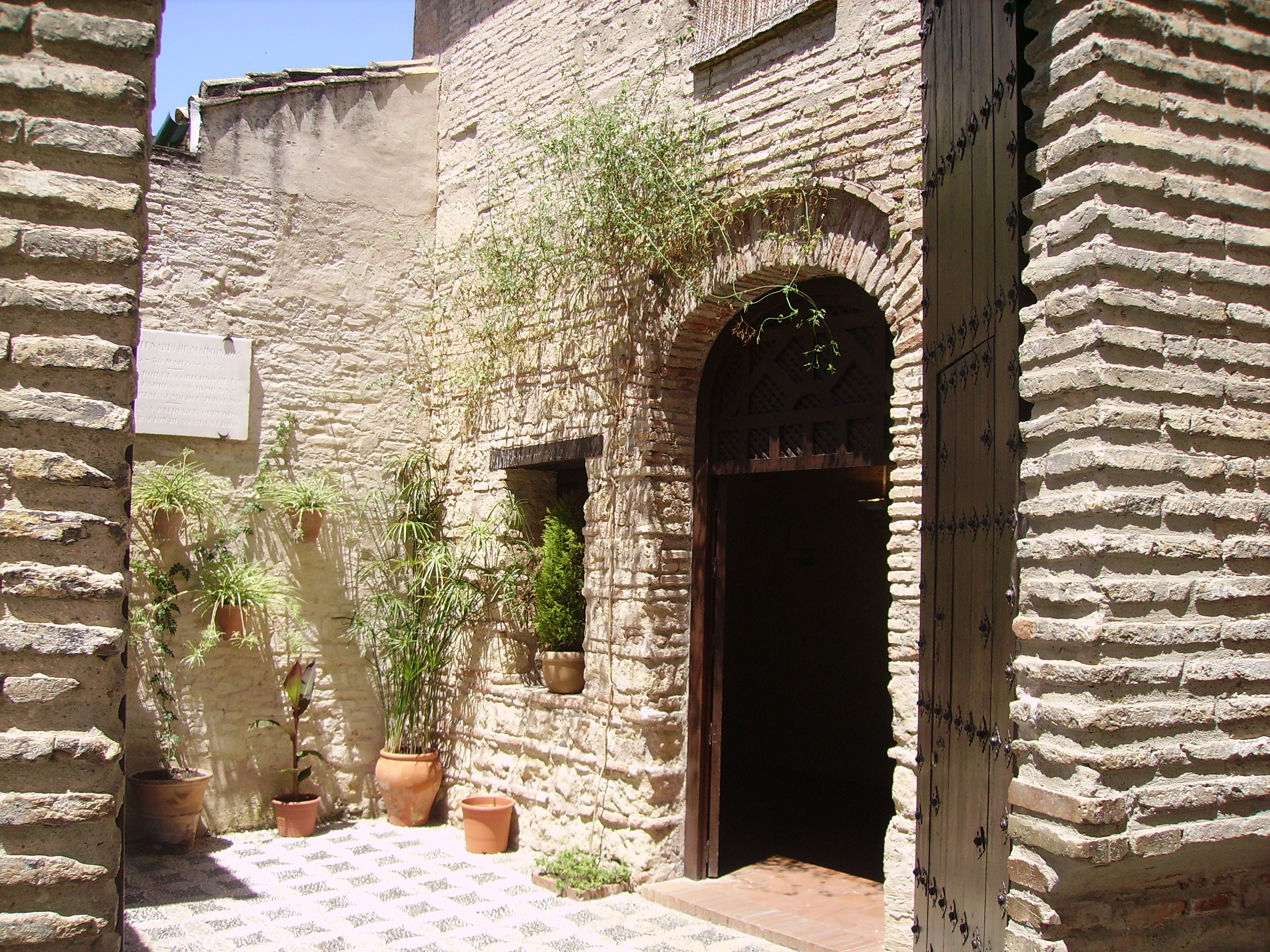
The courtyard of Córdoba Synagogue.

Innocent claimed that additionally to the duty of the pope to protect all Christians, this also applied to all Jews. As such, he re-issued the Sicut Iudaeis, also in response to allegations of ritual murder against the Jews of Vienne, but he could not stop local persecutions.

In April 1250 (5 Iyar), Innocent IV ordered the Bishop of Córdoba to take action against the Jews who were building a synagogue whose height was not acceptable to the local clergy. Documents from the reign of Pope Innocent IV recorded resentment toward a prominent new congregational synagogue:

The Jews of Cordoba are rashly presuming to build a new synagogue of unnecessary height thereby scandalizing faithful Christians, wherefore ... we command [you] ... to enforce the authority of your office against the Jews in this regard....

== Diplomatic relations ==
=== Relations with the Portuguese ===
Innocent IV was responsible for the eventual deposition of King Sancho II of Portugal at the request of his brother Afonso (later King Afonso III of Portugal). One of the arguments he used against Sancho II in the Bull Grandi non immerito was Sancho's status as a minor upon inheriting the throne from his father Afonso II.

=== Contacts with the Mongols ===
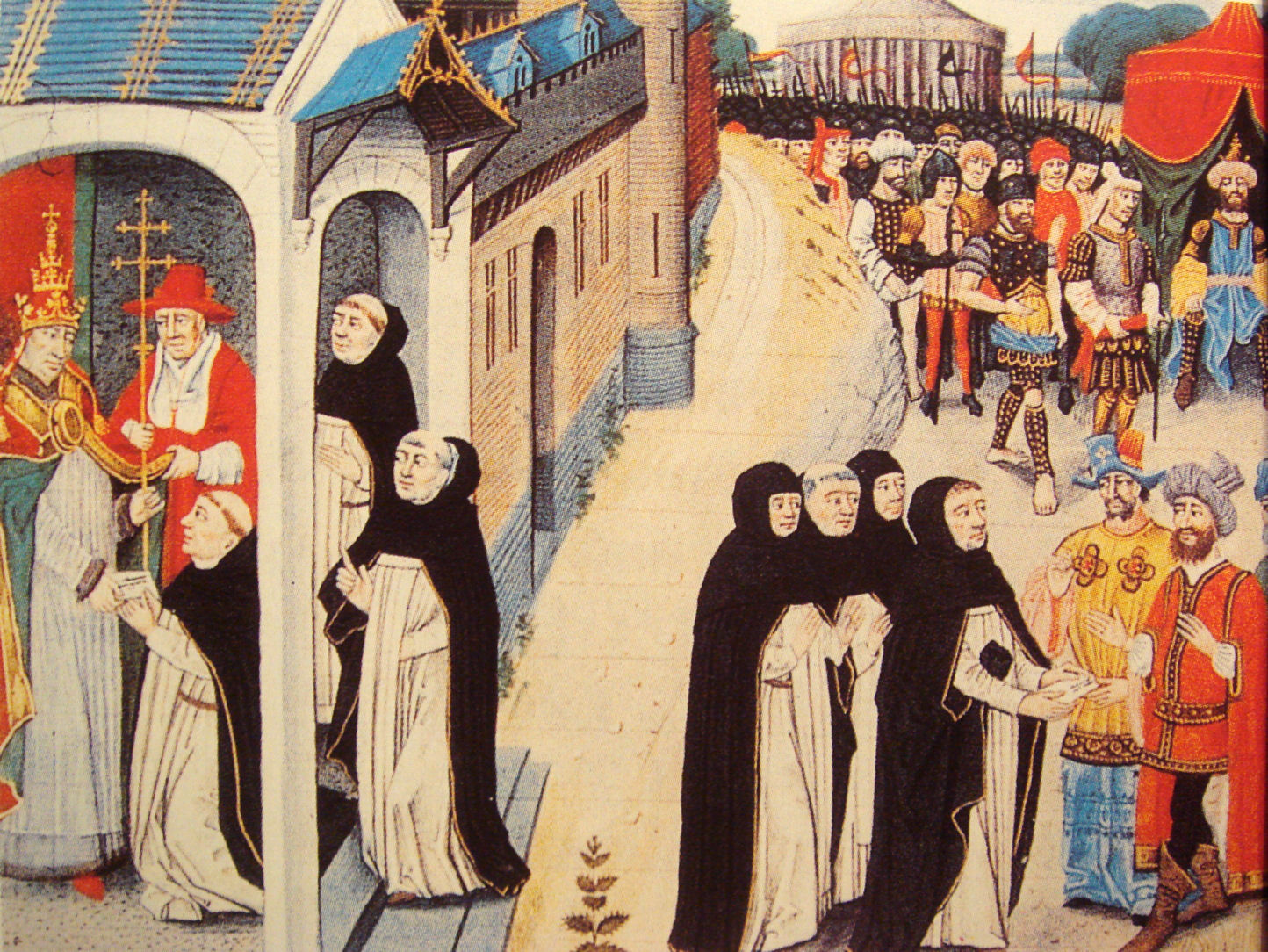
Ascelin of Lombardia receiving a letter from Pope Innocent IV, and remitting it to the Mongol general Baiju

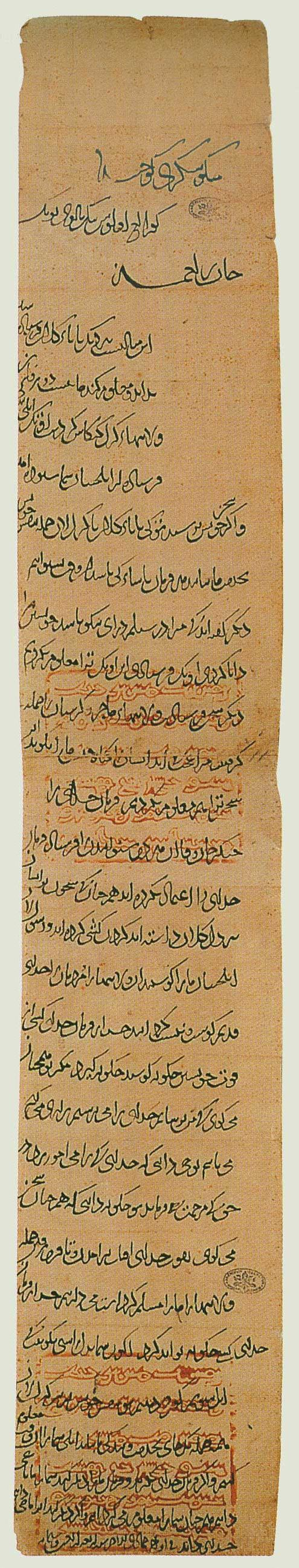
The 1246 letter of Güyük to Pope Innocent IV

The warlike tendencies of the Mongols also concerned the Pope, and in 1245, he issued bulls and sent a papal nuncio in the person of Giovanni da Pian del Carpine (accompanied by Benedict the Pole) to the "Emperor of the Tartars". The message asked the Mongol ruler to become a Christian and stop his aggression against Europe. The Khan Güyük replied in 1246 in a letter written in Persian mixed Turkic that is still preserved in the Vatican Library, demanding the submission of the Pope and the other rulers of Europe.

In 1245 Innocent had sent another mission, through another route, led by Ascelin of Lombardia, also bearing letters. The mission met with the Mongol ruler Baichu near the Caspian Sea in 1247. The reply of Baichu was in accordance with that of Güyük, but it was accompanied by two Mongolian envoys to the Papal seat in Lyon, Aïbeg and Serkis. In the letter, Guyuk demanded that the Pope appear in person at the Mongol imperial headquarters, Karakorum, so that "we might cause him to hear every command that there is of the jasaq". In 1248 the envoys met with Innocent, who again issued an appeal to the Mongols to stop their killing of Christians.

Innocent IV would also send other missions to the Mongols in 1245, including that of André de Longjumeau and the possibly aborted mission of Laurent de Portugal.

== Later politics ==
Despite other concerns, the later years of Innocent's life were largely directed to political schemes for encompassing the overthrow of Manfred of Sicily, the natural son of Frederick II, whom the towns and the nobility had for the most part received as his father's successor. Innocent aimed to incorporate the whole Kingdom of Sicily into the Papal States, but he lacked the necessary economic and political power. Therefore, after a failed agreement with Charles of Anjou, he invested Edmund Crouchback, the nine-year-old son of King Henry III of England, with that kingdom on 14 May 1254.

In the same year, Innocent excommunicated Frederick II's other son, Conrad IV, King of Germany, but the latter died a few days after the investiture of Edmund. Innocent spent the spring of 1254 in Assisi and then, at the beginning of June, moved to Anagni, where he awaited Manfred's reaction to the event, especially considering that Conrad's heir, Conradin, had been entrusted to Papal tutelage by King Conrad's testament. Manfred submitted, although probably only to gain time and counter the menace from Edmund, and accepted the title of papal vicar for southern Italy. Innocent could therefore enjoy a moment in which he was the acknowledged sovereign, in theory at least, of most of the peninsula. Innocent overplayed his hand, however, by accepting the fealty of the city of Amalfi directly to the Papacy instead of to the Kingdom of Sicily on 23 October. Manfred immediately, on 26 October, fled from Teano, where he had established his headquarters, and headed to Lucera to rejoin his Saracen troops.

Manfred had not lost his nerve, and organized resistance to papal aggression. Supported by his faithful Saracen troops, he began using military force to make rebellious barons and towns submit to his authority as Regent for his nephew.

== Final conflict ==
Realizing that Manfred had no intention of submitting to the Papacy or to anyone else, Innocent and his papal army headed south from his summer residence at Anagni on 8 October, intending to confront Manfred's forces. On 27 October 1254 the Pope entered the city of Naples. It was there, on a sick bed, that Innocent heard of Manfred's victory at Foggia on 2 December against the Papal forces, led by the new Papal Legate, Cardinal Guglielmo Fieschi, the Pope's nephew. The tidings are said to have precipitated Pope Innocent's death on 7 December 1254 in Naples. From triumph to disaster had taken only a few months.

Shortly after Innocent's election as pope, his nephew Opizzo had been appointed Latin Patriarch of Antioch. In December 1251 Innocent IV himself appointed another nephew, Ottobuono, Cardinal Deacon of S. Andriano. Ottobuono was subsequently elected Pope Adrian V in 1276.

Upon his death, Innocent IV was succeeded by Pope Alexander IV (Rinaldo de' Conti).

== See also ==
- Fieschi family
- List of popes
- Cardinals created by Innocent IV
- The clash between the Church and the Empire

Catholic Church titles
Preceded by Celestine IV	Pope; 1243–54	Succeeded by Alexander IV
