= Seventh Crusade =

Religious crusade in Egypt from 1248 to 1254

- Part of the Crusades
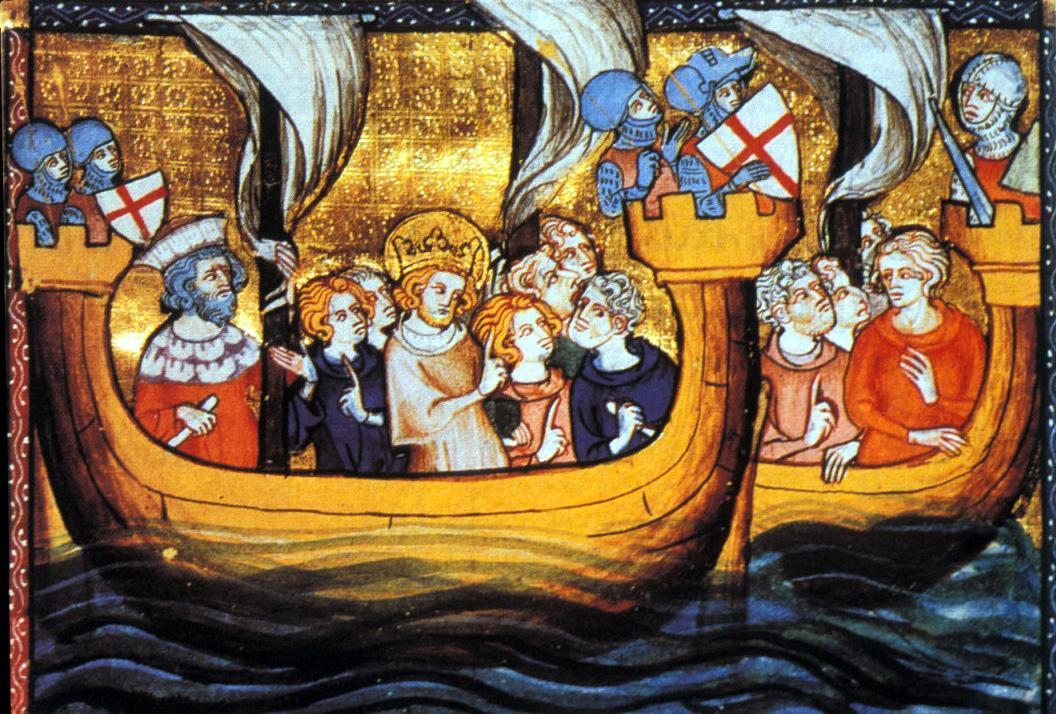
- Louis IX during the Seventh Crusade
Date	1248–1254
Location	Egypt
Result	Ayyubid victory
Territorial changes	Status quo ante bellum

Belligerents
Kingdom of France; Kingdom of England; Latin Empire of Constantinople • Principality of Achaea; Kingdom of Cyprus; Kingdom of Jerusalem; Knights Templar; Knights Hospitaller; Teutonic Order	Ayyubid Sultanate of Egypt: Bahri Mamluks

Commanders and leaders
Louis IX of France (POW); Alphonse of Poitiers; Charles I of Anjou (POW); William of Villehardouin; Robert I of Artois †; Guillaume de Sonnac †; Renaud de Vichiers; Theobald II of Navarre; John II of Soissons (POW); John of Ibelin; Hugh XI of Lusignan †; Hugh IV, Duke of Burgundy (POW); Raoul II of Coucy †; Jean de Ronay †; William Longespée †; Patrick II, Earl of Dunbar †	As-Salih Ayyub #; Turan Shah; Shajar al-Durr; Faris ad-Din Aktai; Qutuz; Fakhr ad-Din †; Aybak; Baybars

Strength
15,000 infantry 2,400–2,800 knights 5,000 crossbowmen	12,000 men 800–1,000 elite Mamluks

Casualties and losses
Heavy: Christian armies destroyed or captured.; Louis IX captured.	Heavy: Muslim armies destroyed in battles fought.

The Seventh Crusade (1248–1254) was the first of the two crusades led by Louis IX of France. Also known as the Crusade of Louis IX to the Holy Land, it aimed to reclaim the Holy Land by attacking the Ayyubid Sultanate, the main Islamic power in the Near East. The crusade was conducted in response to setbacks in the Kingdom of Jerusalem, beginning with the loss of the Holy City in 1244, and was preached by Pope Innocent IV in conjunction with a crusade against Emperor Frederick II, Baltic rebellions and Mongol incursions. After initial success, the crusade ended in defeat, with most of the army – including the king – captured by the Egyptians.

Following his release, Louis stayed in the Holy Land for four years, doing what he could towards the re-establishment of the kingdom. The struggle between the papacy and Holy Roman Empire paralyzed Europe, with few answering Louis' calls for help following his capture and ransoming. The one answer was the Shepherds’ Crusade, started to rescue the king and meeting with disaster. In 1254, Louis returned to France having concluded some important treaties. The second of Louis' crusades was his equally unsuccessful 1270 expedition to Tunis, the Eighth Crusade, where he died of dysentery shortly after the campaign landed.

== Background ==
In the years that followed the Barons' Crusade, the Kingdom of Jerusalem and the Ayyubid dynasty were both beset by internal strife that ultimately proved disastrous for both. The loss of Jerusalem and defeat at Gaza in 1244 ultimately marked the collapse of Christian military power in the Holy Land and led to the rise of the Mamluk sultanate. It is against this backdrop that Louis IX of France and pope Innocent IV began the Seventh Crusade to recover Jerusalem.

=== Jerusalem from 1241 to 1244 ===
The Barons' Crusade ended in 1241 with the Kingdom of Jerusalem at its largest since 1187 after the negotiations made by Theobald I of Navarre. When Richard of Cornwall completed his negotiations with the Muslims, he then secured the support of the influential family of John of Ibelin, the Old Lord of Beirut. Holy Roman Emperor Frederick II had been crowned as king in March 1229, and the Ibelins agreed to accept him as regent as long as Simon de Montfort were appointed bailli until Conrad II of Jerusalem was of age and could receive the kingdom. When Richard returned home on 3 May 1241, the kingdom, still based at Acre, seemed to be restored, but suffered from rejection of Frederick and general lack of any central authority.

While waiting for Frederick's answer to Richard's proposal, the barons kept the claim of Alice of Champagne in reserve. Richard Filangieri remained in Tyre while the various barons returned to their fiefs in Syria and Cyprus, and Philip of Montfort, lord of Tyre, remained in Acre. The Templars, unsatisfied with the treaty with Egypt, besieged the Hospitallers at Acre and Hebron in 1241, who, under grand master Pierre de Vieille-Brioude, had supported the treaty. An-Nasir Dā'ūd, a Hospitaller ally, responded by attacking Christian pilgrims and merchants. Taking revenge, the Templars sacked Nablus on 30 October 1242, burning the mosque and killing the native Christians. The Muslims were not unreasonable in their belief that peace with the Franks was impossible.

Some Hospitallers joined with Filangieri in a plot to turn Acre over to the imperialists. The Templars, Philip of Montfort, the Genoese and Venetians put an end to the coup attempt. The main body of Hospitallers, conducting military action at al-Marqab against Aleppo, returned and de Vieille-Brioude disavowed the plot. The city remained under Ibelin control, while Filangieri was recalled to Italy. On 5 June 1243, the High Court ruled that Alice and her current husband Ralph of Nesle were entitled to rule Jerusalem as regents for Conrad II until he could come to the kingdom. Tyre remained occupied by Richard's brother Lothair Filangieri. When Richard was forced back to the harbor by a storm, fell into the hands of the barons and Lothair had to surrender the citadel at Tyre on 10 July 1243 to save him. Balian of Ibelin was appointed royal custodian of Tyre and the lordship was eventually assigned to Philip of Montfort. Jerusalem was essentially a feudal republic administered by the most powerful barons.

After the recovery of Jerusalem and much of Galilee, the kingdom was unable to sufficiently reorganize to counter the threats from the Ayyubids and Mongols. The quarrels between imperialist followers of Frederick II and the Ibelins, between the Templars and Hospitallers, and Acre versus Tyre left the kingdom almost defenseless. The defeat of the imperialists left the Templars in a strong position, negotiating a treaty in 1243 with a coalition of the rulers of Homs, Kerak, and Damascus against Egypt that eased tensions and restored Temple Mount to the order. Grand master Armand de Périgord triumphantly reported the return of the Templars to their original home to the pope. While the treaty promised to enhance Frankish security in Syria, but would prove toothless in light of the impending onslaught.

=== The Ayyubids and the loss of Jerusalem ===
Since the death of the sultan al-Kamil in 1238, the political situation in Egypt and the Levant was chaotic, stoked by rivalries between his sons. In early 1240, while making ready to invade Egypt, as-Salih Ayyub, the eldest son, was informed that his half-brother Al-Adil II, then sultan, was being held prisoner by his own soldiers. He was invited to come at once and assume the sultanate. In June 1240, he made a triumphal entry into Cairo and assumed rule of the dynasty. Once installed in Cairo, as-Salih was far from secure, as the dynasty and associated Kurdish clans had divided loyalties. Within Egypt, a powerful faction of emirs were conspiring to depose him and replace him with his uncle, as-Salih Ismail, who had regained control of Damascus. As-Salih took refuge in the Cairo citadel, no longer trusting even the once-loyal emirs who had brought him to power. Kipchak mercenaries became available following the Mongol invasion in central Asia and soon formed the core of his army known as Mamluks. Before the end of the Seventh Crusade, the Mamluks would eventually overthrow the Ayyubid dynasty and take power on their own.

Beginning in 1240, a Central Asian tribe known as the Khwarezmians attacked the territories of Aleppo and would within four years decimate the Levant. Lacking strong leadership since the death of Jalal al-Din Mangburni, they were essentially freebooters operating as a mercenary band. They defeated the Aleppine army of al-Mu'azzam Tūrān-shāh, son of Saladin, near B'zaah on 11 November 1240, before taking Manbij. The emir of Homs, al-Mansur Ibrahim newly installed after the death of his father al-Mujahid, brought forces to bear, eventually defeating the Khwarezmians near Edessa on 6 January 1241, sharing the spoils with Badr al-Din Lu'lu', emir of Damascus. The army of Aleppo then combined with a Seljuk force led by Kaykhusraw II to defeat an Ayyubid army led by as-Salih's son and deputy al-Muazzam Turanshah at Amida. The Khwarezmians then allied with al-Muzaffar Ghazi to mount a counterattack, and were defeated at al-Majdal in August 1242. Kaykhusraw II was then dealt a crushing defeat by the Mongols at the Battle of Köse Dağ in June 1243, threatening the whole of Mesopotamia.

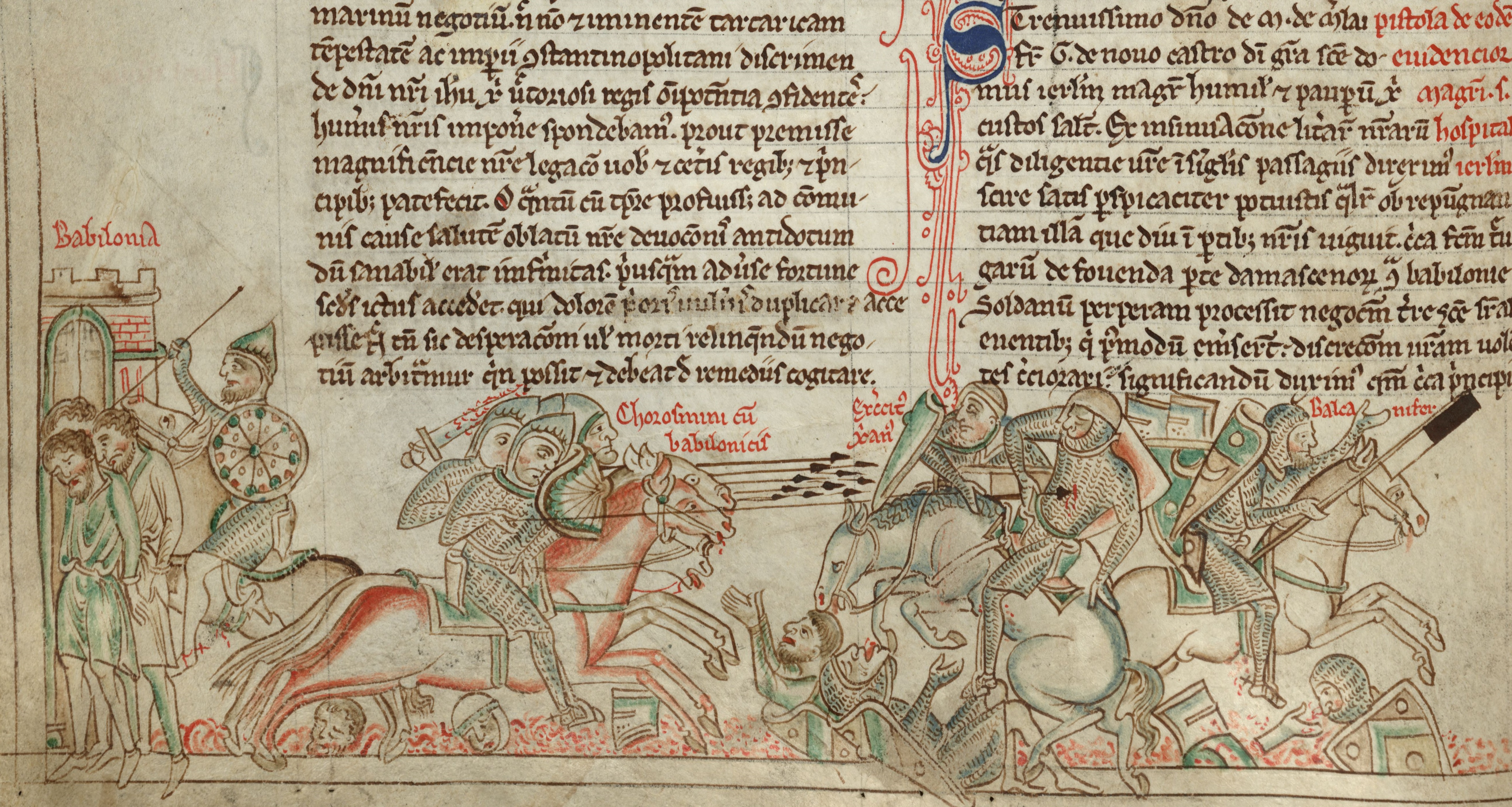
Battle of La Forbie, from Chronica Majora by Matthew Paris

At as-Salih's invitation, the Khwarezmian army advanced through Syria and Palestine and, in the Siege of Jerusalem of 15 July 1244, destroyed the Holy City. The city's citadel, the Tower of David, surrendered on 23 August 1244, and the Christian population of the city was expelled or massacred. Later that year as-Salih, again allied to the Khwarezmians, confronted as-Salih Ismail, now allied with the Crusaders, at Gaza in the Battle of La Forbie, marking the collapse of Christian power in the Holy Land. In 1245, as-Salih captured Damascus, and was awarded the title of sultan by the caliph al-Musta'sim in Baghdad. In 1246, he assessed that his Khwarezmian allies were dangerously uncontrollable, so he turned on them and defeated them near Homs, killing their leaders and dispersing the remnants throughout Syria and Palestine. Three years later when the Crusade began, as-Salih was away fighting his uncle in Syria and quickly returned to Egypt where he died on 22 November 1249.

=== The military orders ===
The treaty of 1243 with the Ayyubids did not keep the peace for long, but the military orders in the kingdom united to fight at Hirbiya in what is sometimes called the Battle of La Forbie, sometimes known as the Battle of Gaza, from 17 to 18 October 1244. Here the Crusaders, led by Walter IV of Brienne, and a Damascene army met the Egyptian and Khwarezmian armies. In what was to be the final major battle between the Franks and Muslims, 5000 Crusaders died and 800 were taken prisoner. Among the dead were Armand de Périgord, Grand Master of the Temple, and Peter II of Sargines, archbishop of Tyre. Taken prisoner were Guillaume de Chateauneuf, Grand Master of the Hospitaller, and the commander Walter IV of Brienne. Only 33 Templars, 27 Hospitallers, and three Teutonic Knights survived, escaping to Ascalon along with Philip of Montfort and Latin patriarch Robert of Nantes. Jean de Ronay, in an acting capacity for the Hospitallers, and Guillaume de Sonnac, Armand's successor, would go on the support the Seventh Crusade. Both arrived in the Holy Land after the 1244 defeats. Hugues de Revel, lord of Krak des Chevaliers from 1243 to 1248, would become de Chateauneuf's permanent successor in 1258.

=== Louis IX of France ===
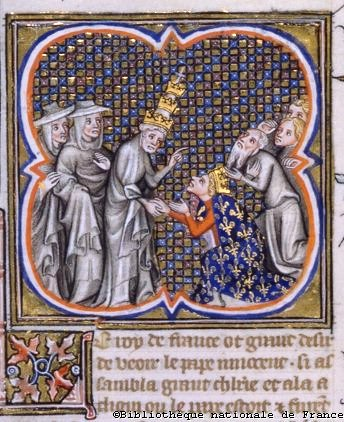
Innocent IV with Louis IX at Cluny

At the end of 1244, Louis IX of France was stricken with a severe malarial infection. Near death, he vowed that if he recovered he would set out for a crusade. His life was spared, and as soon as his health permitted him, he took the cross and immediately began preparations. The crusade that Louis would lead has been described as "perhaps the only expedition since the days of Godfrey of Bouillon that deserved the name of a Holy War." He had already been much distressed by the plight of John of Brienne during the siege of Constantinople of 1235, and dispatched a mission led by the Dominican André de Longjumeau to acquire Holy relics, including the Crown of Thorns, parts of the True Cross, the Holy Lance, and the Holy Sponge. The Sainte-Chapelle in Paris was begun by Louis to hold and display his sacred objects in a large reliquary. (The reliquary and associated vessels were melted down during the French Revolution. The crown is currently in the Louvre, saved from the 2019 fire at Notre-Dame de Paris.) Papal blessing for the Crusade would come later.

=== Innocent IV ===
Innocent IV became pope on 25 June 1243, facing both religious and political crusades. At that time, the papacy was engaged in a feud with emperor Frederick II, then under excommunication. Frederick was at first pleased with his election, but it was soon clear that Innocent intended to carry on his predecessors' traditions. Fearing a plan to kidnap him, Innocent IV left Rome in March 1244, pursued by the emperor's cavalry, travelling to Lyons. He wrote to Louis IX, asking for asylum, which was cautiously refused. In exile, the pope presided over First Council of Lyon in 1245. The council directed a new crusade under the command of Louis IX, who had already taken the cross, with the objective of reconquering the Holy Land. With Rome under siege by Frederick, that year the pope also issued his Ad Apostolicae Dignitatis Apicem, formally renewing the sentence of excommunication on the emperor, and declared him deposed from the imperial throne and that of Naples.

From Gregory IX, Innocent IV inherited a Prussian Crusade targeting the Orthodox Russians. Innocent was also the first to seriously face the challenge posed by the Mongol incursion into Europe in the course of 1241. After Lyons, Innocent sent envoys to the Mongols (see below) who also negotiated with Russian princes over church union with Rome. As both Daniel Romanovich of Galicia-Volhynia and Yaroslav II, grand prince of Vladimir, seemed to respond positively, the pope abandoned the idea of an alliance with the Mongols and aimed instead to form a grand alliance with the Russians to counter the Mongol threat. In January 1248, Innocent joined with Heinrich von Hohenlohe, Grand Master of the Teutonic Order, in warning Daniel and Yaroslav's son Alexander Nevsky of impending Mongol attacks on Christianity and to unite under papal protection in the defense against the invaders. Both Russian princes accepted the proposal. Eventually, all eastern European rulers still not under Mongol domination had now joined Innocent's alliance, however short-lived. In September 1243, he issued the bull Qui iustis causis, authorizing further Northern Crusades.

Innocent IV was determined in his goal of the destruction of Frederick II. The attempts undertaken by Louis IX to bring about peace were of no avail. In 1249 the pope ordered a crusade to be preached against Frederick II, and after the emperor's death in December 1250, he continued the struggle against Conrad IV of Germany and his half-brother Manfred of Sicily with unrelenting severity. The crown of Sicily had devolved upon the Holy See after the deposition of Frederick II, and Innocent first offered it to Richard of Cornwall and Edmund Crouchback, brother and son of Henry III of England. After the death of Conrad IV in May 1254, the pope finally recognized the hereditary claims of Conrad's two-year-old son Conradin. Manfred also submitted, but soon revolted and defeated the papal troops at the Battle of Foggia on 2 December 1254. Innocent IV died a few days later.

=== Negotiations with the Mongols ===
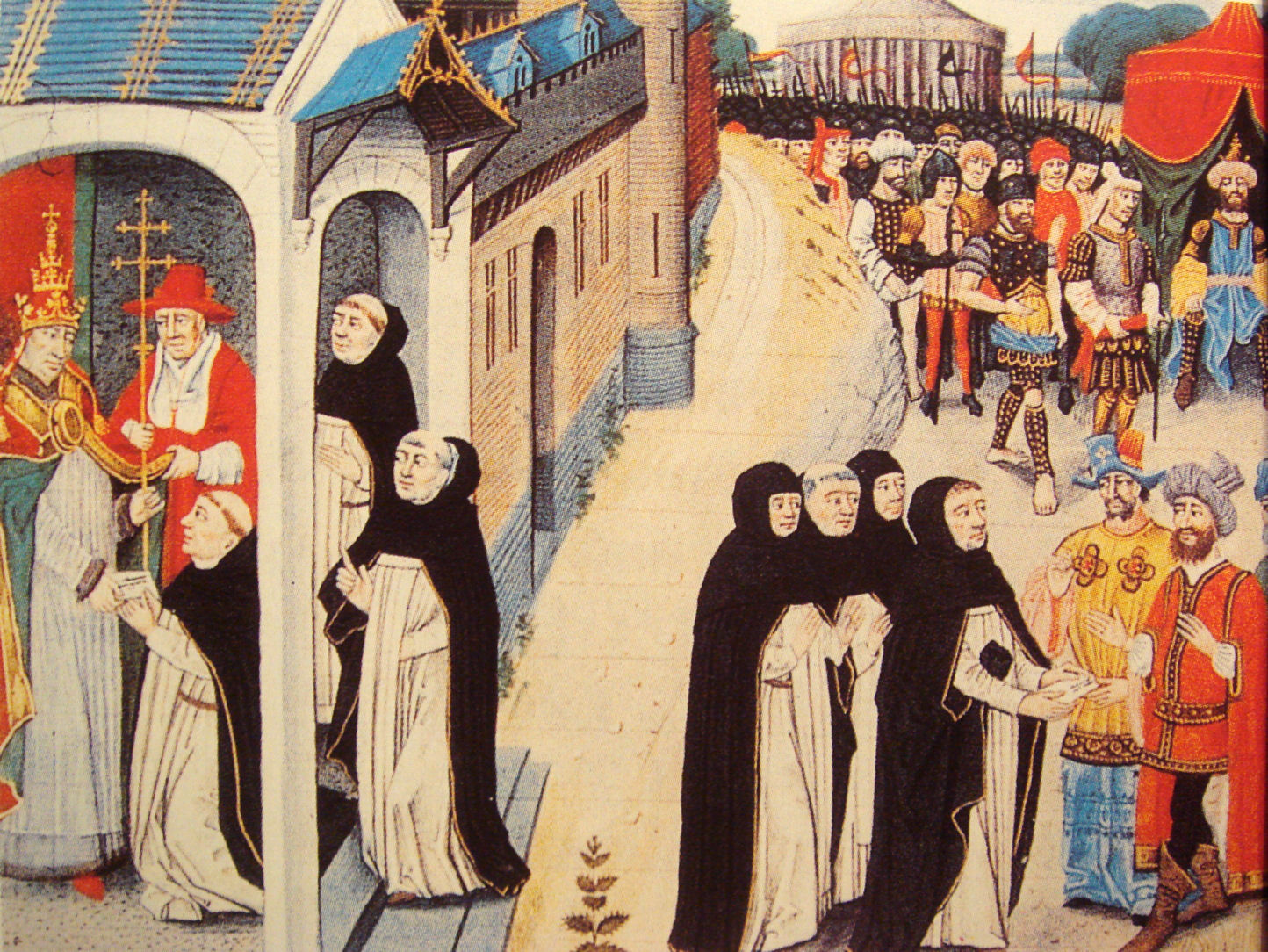
Ascelin of Lombardy with the Mongol general Baiju.

In 1245, Innocent IV supplemented efforts in the Holy Land and Baltics by sending two embassies to Mongolia to the court of the Great Khan, beginning the attempts at a Franco-Mongol alliance. The first was led by the Franciscan John of Plano Carpini, traveling across Russia and Central Asia to Karakorum. In August 1246, he witnessed a Kuriltayi that elevated Güyük Khan to power. Güyük, after receiving the pope's request for him to accept Christianity, demanded that the pope acknowledge his suzerainty and to come to pay him homage. Upon his return at the end of 1247, John reported to Rome that the Mongols were only out for conquest. His second embassy was the Dominican Ascelin of Lombardy who travelled to meet the Mongol general Baiju Noyan at Tabriz in May 1247. Baiju and Ascelin discussed an alliance against the Ayyubids. He planned to attack Baghdad, and it would suit him to have the Syrians distracted by a crusade of the Franks. He sent his envoys, Aïbeg and Serkis, with Ascelin to Rome causing the hopes of the West rise again. In November 1248, they returned to Baiju with no further action on the proposed alliance.

== Preparations ==
In 1244, the peace of the previous decade was quickly swept away, negating prospects that appeared brighter than at any time since the late 12th century. Most of the Frankish gains in southern Palestine were lost, with Ascalon falling in 1247. The disaster in the East threw the survival of the Kingdom of Jerusalem into doubt. Pleas for help were dispatched to the West. Louis IX of France had taken the cross after his near-fatal illness, and it remained unclear whether he received the cross for its mystical healing properties, a belief widely held by contemporaries, or as a token of gratitude after hovering between life and death. The driving motive behind the French king's commitment lay in his own personality, piety and ambition. Despite apparently strong initial opposition from his mother and other members of his entourage, Louis stuck to his decision, repeating his vow when he recovered and persuading his brothers and those in his court to follow suit.

=== Recruiting ===
Louis had taken the cross from William of Auvergne, bishop of Paris, without prior papal authorization. Beside his ecclesiastical role, William was an expert on Arabic affairs and may have doubted the wisdom of the king's decision. Regardless of the maternal, episcopal and political opposition, Louis pressed ahead with the idea that his Crusade was a personal and spiritual rite of passage.

Within two months, the papal bull was issued, with preaching of the Crusade authorized. Odo of Châteauroux, cardinal-bishop of Frascati, began preaching in France, legitimizing regional preachers and collecting funds. Odo had been deeply involved in the crusading movement for decades, having personally preached the cross against the Albigensian heretics in 1226, against the Mongols around 1240, and, later, against the Muslims in the Holy Land through Louis' second Crusade. As cardinal he masterminded the propaganda campaign for Louis’ first Crusade and accompanied the king to the East as papal legate. While the plight of the Holy Land and French national pride was stressed in their pleas, preachers had also to spell out how the faithful could contribute, in person, with money or through prayer.

The preaching campaign of 1245–1248 did not go smoothly. Odo had to balance the call to the Holy Land with the war against Frederick II. The French government deliberately associated Louis' Crusade with the suppression of the rebellion at the Siege of Montségur in 1244, the final carryover from the Albigensian Crusade. The rebels were induced to take the cross as a symbol of loyalty to the Capetians. Other competing crusades included the Prussian Crusade, a Livonian Crusade against the Curonians, and a proposed crusade to protect Constantinople from Nicaea.

Recruitment in the French court was slow to develop. Louis’ youngest brother Alphonse of Poitiers, taking the cross in 1245, had his army ready only in the spring of 1249. In northern France, men were still joining up into 1250, and the other brothers, Charles I of Anjou and Robert I of Artois, also joined. Recruitment was concentrated in the kingdom of France, Burgundy, Lorraine and the Low Countries between the Meuse and the Rhine. In 1248, Louis was unsuccessful in convincing Haakon IV of Norway to join him as commander of the Crusader fleet. Apart from the king and his brothers, there were loyalists including crusading veterans Hugh IV of Burgundy, Peter Maulcerc, and his vassal Raoul de Soissons, with rebels including Raymond VII of Toulouse and his father-in-law Hugh X of Lusignan. Recruits came from across the kingdom, from Flanders and Brittany to Poitou, the Bourbonnais and Languedoc. From Brittany, it appears that practically all the major landowners participated. Theobald of Champagne declined to join, but the Champenois provided 1,000 men. Early in 1247, Crusaders at Châteaudun had formed a confratria to purchase materials and ships, providing funding for those who went to fight, and to collect donations by non-crucesignati. Indulgences were granted and often misused. By 1246, after numerous incidents, crucesignati were no longer permitted to avoid lawsuits involving fiefs and pledges. Many were indulging in theft, murder and rape, causing the pope to order bishops not to protect such miscreants, crusade privileges notwithstanding.

=== English participation ===
Henry III of England, defeated by Louis IX in 1242 at Taillebourg, did not want to get involved in a French war. He denied entry to Galeran, Bishop of Beirut, who had sailed from Acre on behalf of Latin patriarch Robert of Nantes. His mission was to tell the princes of the West that reinforcements must be sent if the whole kingdom were not to perish. Robert had been present at La Forbie, barely escaping, and later sent a relic of the Holy Blood to Henry III in an ultimately unsuccessful attempt to convince him to go on crusade. Henry did sign a truce promising not to attack French lands during the Crusade, and a small force of Englishmen, led by William Longespée, also took the cross. English chronicler Matthew Paris assisted Louis IX in his attempt to recruit Haakon IV and wrote of the Crusade in his Chronica Majora but did not travel to the Holy Land.

=== Financing the Crusade ===
Louis’ expenses on the Crusade came to over 1.5 million livres tournois (l.t.), six times his annual revenues, with the bill for troops running at 1000 l.t. a day. Louis was largely able to cover this from sources other than his ordinary revenues. From 1248, Jewish moneylenders were expelled from the kingdom, their property confiscated, representing the king's anti-Jewish policies and prejudices. Some 80 towns from across France raised over 70,000 l.t. in 1248, a figure matched by contributions from Normandy. Louis’ taxation of towns was not unprecedented, as royal towns had helped pay for the Second Crusade led by his great-grandfather, Louis VII of France.

The bulk of Louis’ funding was money derived primarily from vow redemptions and clerical taxation. Redemptions were systematically being offered and collected. The pope expressed concerns the conditions for redemption were too lax and the rates accepted too low, with the potential for speculation and fraud, causing him to impose an audit. As to clerical taxation, a tax of a twentieth was authorized and the French clergy offered a tenth over five years. The distraction of the anti-Hohenstaufen crusade (against Frederick II) and the view of the Holy Land venture as a French crusade reduced international contributions, the English and German churches remaining on the sidelines. Individual commanders, including the king's brothers, received grants, and also raised funds from their own lands. However, the bulk of crusade funds and clerical taxes probably found their way into the royal coffers. With the increased income for the king's own demesne, this centralized system of financing the expedition gave Louis unprecedented control over his main followers.

=== Jean de Joinville ===
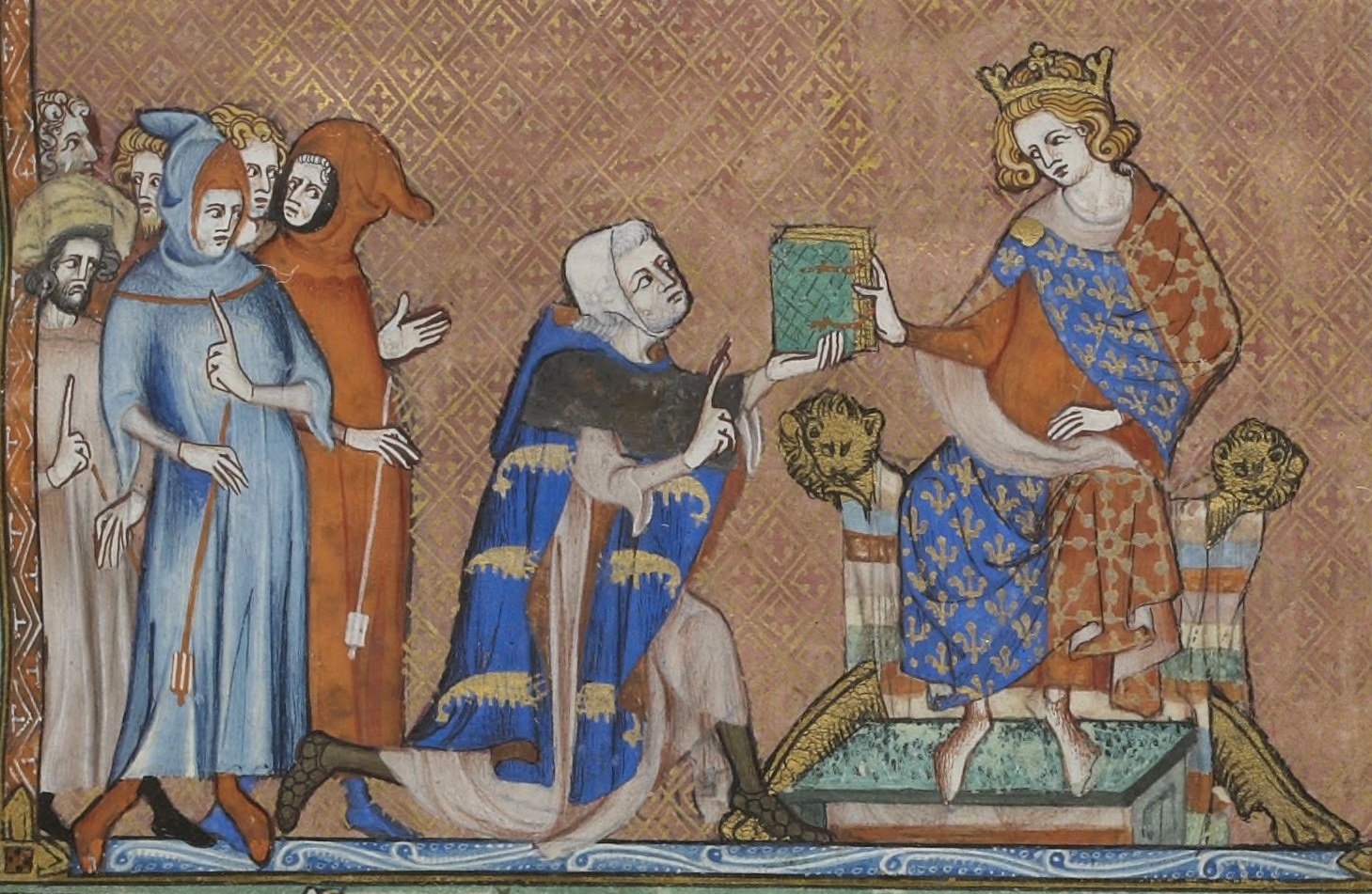
Jean de Joinville presenting his book Life of Saint Louis to Louis X of France, miniature, 1330s.

In October 1245, Louis gathered his barons to receive their agreement and support for the Crusade. The next year, he held another such gathering in Paris of noblemen to swear fealty to his children in the event of his not returning from the Crusade. One of those summoned was Jean de Joinville-sur-Marne, seneschal of Champagne, whose account is the most detailed personal description of any crusade. Joinville was from a crusading family. His grandfather had died on the Third Crusade, two uncles had joined the Fourth Crusade, one dying, and his father Simon of Joinville had fought in the Albigensian Crusade and in Egypt with his cousin John of Brienne during the Fifth Crusade. Refusing to swear fealty to Louis in 1248, Jean embarked from Marseilles with a company of twenty knights. Despite mortgaging his lands, his funds were gone by the time he reached Cyprus. His retinue became mutinous, forcing Jean to enter the king's service, in return for which he received an immediate grant. This pattern of debt rescued by Louis' aid was widespread, involving even substantial lords such as the royal brother Alphonse, Guy of Flanders and Guy V of Forez.

=== Transportation and supplies ===
The core of the expedition lay in the ships that Louis had hired, sixteen from Genoa and twenty from Marseille. The contracts drawn up in 1246 specified delivery at Aigues-Mortes, a small port with a shallow harbour that had recently become part of the royal demesne, requiring significant upgrading. Guglielmo Boccanegra served as Genoese consul at the port through 1249, later serving as paymaster for the Crusade in Acre. The force of 10,000 strong that sailed with Louis in late August 1248 was of comparable size with that of Richard I of England in April 1191. Others took alternate routes. Jean de Joinville and Raymond VII of Toulouse (who died before he could depart) contracted with shippers at Marseilles. Hugh I of Blois, who also died before setting out from Inverness, while one of the transports for Raymond's force had to come to Marseilles from the Atlantic coast via the Straits of Gibraltar, a delay that kept the count in port for the winter 1248–1249. Alphonse of Poitiers, running out of money, sailed East in 1249. By the time Louis reached Cyprus, the designated muster point, his agents had spent two years stockpiling vast quantities of food. Other supplies were either purchased in Cyprus or shipped with the army from France. By hiring, paying, buying or manufacturing, Louis appeared determined to leave as little as possible to fate or chance.

=== Political and diplomatic environment ===
Louis' preparations had taken three years. Extraordinary taxes, including on the clergy, were levied to pay for the expedition. The governing of France in his absence needed to be settled, and Louis' mother Blanche was entrusted once more with the regency. The foreign problems were many. Henry III of England had to be trusted to keep the peace. The Venetians, already annoyed at yet another Crusade that might interrupt their commercial arrangements with Egypt, were made still more hostile when Louis utilized ships from Genoa and Marseilles.The situation with emperor Frederick II was unusually thorny. Louis had earned Frederick's gratitude by his neutrality in the quarrel between the papacy and the empire, but had threatened intervention when Frederick proposed an attack on the pope at Lyons. Frederick was the father of the king of Jerusalem, Conrad II of Jerusalem, without whose permission Louis had no right to enter the country. Complicating the situation, when French envoys informed Frederick of the progress of the Crusade, he passed the information on to the sultan as-Salih Ayyub.

== The expedition to Egypt ==
Map of Seventh Crusade

The Seventh Crusade formally began on 12 August 1248 when Louis IX left from Paris. His entourage included his wife, consort queen of France Margaret of Provence, two of the king's brother, Charles I of Anjou with his wife, Beatrice of Provence, sister of Margaret, and Robert I of Artois. The youngest brother of Louis Alphonse of Poitiers with his wife Joan of Toulouse, departed the next year. The king's retinue included his cousins and vassals, Hugh IV of Burgundy and Peter Maulcerc, who were considered veterans due to their participation in the Barons' Crusade; the seigneur and vassal Hugh XI of Lusignan; Jean de Joinville with his cousin John, Count of Saarbrücken; and Olivier de Termes, who was veteran of the Albigensian Crusade. Some of them embarked at Aigues-Mortes, others at Marseilles. An English detachment was led by William Longespée, grandson of Henry II of England, who took his mistress Ida de Tosny (not the rumoured Fair Rosamond) along, followed close behind. The rest of the English lords who had pledged to join the crusade were kept back by Henry III with papal help. The Scottish lords that joined were Patrick II of Dunbar and Stewart of Dundonald.

=== The Crusade begins ===
By the time the preparations for the Crusade were reaching finalisation, Louis was progressing towards the port of Aigues Mortes in a markedly religious royal procession. The king's departure saw a climactic series of ceremonies that culminated in the consecration of the Sainte Chapelle. This, the palace's chapel, was built as the actual reliquary container housing his newly acquired collection of Holy relics from the Passion that Baldwin II, the Latin emperor of Constantinople, had sent him. The king of France with his crusade was attempting to fill in the vacated position of the par excellence leader of Christendom, an eventuality that happened due to the friction between the emperor Frederick II and pope Gregory IX, leading the latter to excommunicate the former. Louis was embarking on the Crusade in his royal capacity as leader, not least as a personal commitment that rendered him a penitent. Before leaving Paris, Louis went to the Abbey of St. Denis where he received the Oriflamme which was considered to be the insignia of the pilgrim. From there he then marched to Notre Dame dressed as a penitent where he heard the mass. After that he continued barefoot to the Abbey of St. Antoine. Even after he had left Paris, Louis was still being dressed as a pilgrim in public appearances. At Lyons, he met with Innocent IV and from there he travelled towards the Mediterranean, dispensing justice as he went. He was the first French king to visit the region since his father in 1226. On 25 August, Louis set sail to his first destination the town of Limassol in Lusignan Cyprus.

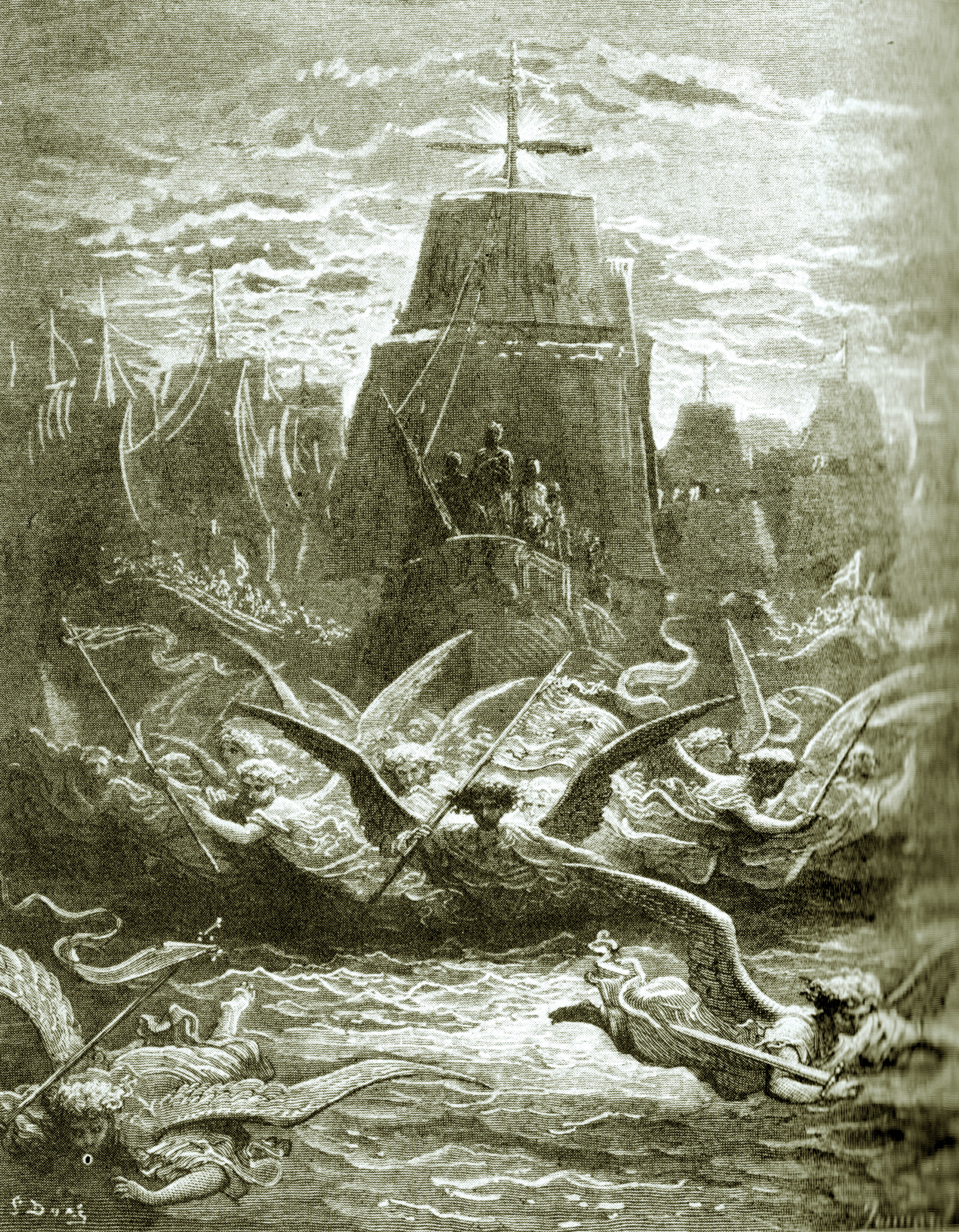
Engraving representing the departure from Aigues-Mortes of King Louis IX for the crusade (by Gustave Doré)

=== Interlude in Cyprus ===
Louis IX arrived in Cyprus on 17 September 1248 and landed the next day accompanied by his queen, her sister, and his chamberlain Jean Pierre Sarrasin (John the Saracen). Sarrasin wrote an extensive letter, quoted in the Rothelin, apropos of their voyage at sea, an experience of some good 22 days. After a discourse by Rothelin's anonymous author on the perils of sea travel and authentic or legendary Roman history, the work returns to Sarrasin's letter for the events occurring through 1250. After arriving in Cyprus, the royal party had a long wait for their forces to assemble. The delay was costly, as many men were lost to diseases, including John of Montfort, son of a crusader, Peter of Vendôme, John I of Dreux, and Archambaud IX of Bourbon, grandson of a veteran of the Third Crusade. Robert VII of Béthune was among those who died en route to Cyprus. Similarly costly were, however, the limited funding some of his vassals had who then required royal support. As the troops for the Crusade gathered in Cyprus, they were well received by Henry I of Cyprus. The nobles from France were supplemented by those from Acre, among whom were Jean de Ronay and Guillaume de Sonnac. The two eldest sons of John of Brienne, Alsonso of Brienne and Louis of Brienne, also joined and outlived the Crusade. John of Ibelin, nephew to the Old Lord of Beirut, joined later in 1249. When the plan of the campaign was discussed, it was agreed that Egypt was the objective. It was the richest and most vulnerable province of the Ayyubids and many remembered how the sultan's father, al-Kamil had been willing to exchange Jerusalem itself for Damietta in the Fifth Crusade.

Louis wanted to start operations at once but was deterred from the grand masters and Syrian barons. The winter storms would soon begin and the coast of the delta of Nile would be too dangerous to reach. In addition, they hoped to persuade the king to intervene in the Ayyubid affairs. The Franks also missed an opportunity as the sultan as-Salih Ayyub had taken his army to fight an-Nasir Yusuf, emir of Aleppo, at Homs. The Templars had already entered into negotiations with the sultan suggesting that territorial concessions would be met with Frankish intervention. Louis wanted to have nothing to do with scheming or excelling at diplomacy, he had come to fight the Muslims. He ordered Guillaume de Sonnac to break the negotiations off and sent a list of demands to the sultan. The sultan's response was equally diplomatic.

While the king would not negotiate with Muslims, he did so with the Mongols following the precedent of the pope. In December 1248, two Nestorians, called Mark and David, arrived at Nicosia. They were sent by the Mongol general Eljigidei Noyan, the commissioner of the Great Khan at Mosul, bringing a letter expressing the Mongols’ sympathy for Christianity. Louis responded by sending the Arabic-speaking André de Longjumeau to meet with the general. He carried with him a chapel, relics for its altar and other presents. From Eljigidei's camp, de Longjumeau sent on to Mongolia. On his arrival at Karakorum, he found that Güyük, with whom the pope had negotiated, had died, with his widow Oghul Qaimish now as regent. She regarded the king's gifts as the tribute due to her and declined sending a large expedition to the West. De Longjumeau returned in 1252 with a patronizing letter thanking her vassal Louis for his attentions, requesting that similar gifts each year. Apparently shocked by this response, Louis still hoped to achieve an eventual Mongol alliance.

Before coming to Cyprus, Louis had collected food and weapons for the army on the island, but his commissariat had not expected to have to feed so many. By spring, it was practical to sail against Egypt and Louis called on local Italian merchants for their ships. The Venetians disapproved of the endeavour and were unwilling to help due to their open war against the Genoese and their allies the Pisans in Acre, let alone to Louis' alliance with the Genoese. John of Ibelin, son of the Old Lord and now ruler of Arsuf, managed to secure a truce for three years, and by the end of May the ships were provided. In the meantime, Louis received many callers while at Nicosia. Hethoum of Armenia sent him gifts. Bohemond V of Antioch requested several hundred archers to protect his principality from brigands, which were provided. Maria of Brienne came to beg for help for the Latin empire being threatened by John III Ducas Vatatzes, the emperor of Nicaea. Her pleas were refused as the Crusade against the infidel took precedence. Loyalist Hugh IV of Burgundy had spent the winter in Achaea and convinced their ruler William of Villehardouin to join the Crusade. He arrived with ships and Frankish soldiers from the Morea, to remain for the duration.

=== The Crusaders at Damietta ===
The sultan as-Salih Ayyub had spent the winter at Damascus, trying to finish the conquest of Homs before the Franks invaded. He had expected them to land in Syria, and realizing that the objective was instead Egypt, the siege was lifted and he ordered his armies to follow him to Cairo. He was stricken with tuberculosis and could no longer lead his men in person and turned to his aged vizier Fakhr ad-Din ibn as-Shaikh, who had negotiated with Frederick II during the Sixth Crusade, to command the army. He sent stores of munitions to Damietta and garrisoned it with the Bedouin tribesmen of the Banū Kinana, known for their courage. He monitored the coming conflict from his camp at the village of Ashmun al-Rumman, to the east of the main branch of the Nile. Fakhr ad-Din was supported by Qutuz, later to become the sultan. (See a map of the area here.)

On 13 May 1249, a fleet of one hundred and twenty large transport vessels was assembled and the army began its embarkation. A storm scattered the ships a few days later and the king finally set sail on 30 May, arriving off Damietta on 4 June 1249. Only a quarter of his contingent sailed with him, the rest made their way independently to the Egyptian coast. Aboard his flagship the Montjoie, Louis' advisers urged delay of disembarking till the rest of the fleet units' arrival, but he refused. At dawn of 5 June, the landing and subsequent Siege of Damietta began. There was a fierce battle at the edge of the sea led by the king. Under John of Ibelin of the knights of France and Outremer prevailed against their Muslims adversaries. At nightfall, Fakhr ad-Din withdrew over a bridge of boats to Damietta, only to find the population in panic and the garrison wavering, leading him to evacuate the city. All the Muslim civilians fled with him, with the Kinana following, but not before setting the bazaars to fire. His orders to destroy the bridge of boats were not observed, allowing for the Crusaders entrance to the city. The latter had received news from its Christian population that Damietta was then undefended. Guillaume de Sonnac wrote of how on the morning after the battle, Damietta had been seized with only one Crusader casualty.

The rapid capture of Damietta was unexpected, but the Nile floods would soon pin down the Crusaders. Louis, knowing the experience of the first Battle of Mansurah in 1221 during the Fifth Crusade, would not advance before the river flowed. He was also waiting for the arrival of the reinforcements under his brother Alphonse. In the meantime, Damietta once again transformed into a Frankish city. The Amr Ibn al-A'as Mosque became the cathedral, where Louis' son would later be baptized, and Gilles of Saumur was made archbishop. The Genoese and Pisans were rewarded for their services, and so were the Venetians repenting their hostility. The native Coptic Miaphysites were given justice by the king, welcoming his rule. Queen Margaret and the rest of the ladies of the Crusade were summoned from Acre. Louis also welcomed his ally the Latin emperor, Baldwin II of Constantinople, who being in dire need of monies had sold him the Passion relics. Throughout the summer months Damietta became briefly the capital of Outremer. The inaction brought to the soldiers along with the humid heat of the Delta demoralization. Food shortage followed disease outbreak in the camp.

The loss of Damietta again shocked the Muslim world, and, like his father thirty years ago, as-Salih Ayyub offered to trade Damietta for Jerusalem. The offer was rejected as Louis refused to negotiate with an infidel. Meanwhile, those responsible for the loss of the city were punished, with the Kinana emirs executed and Fakhr ad-Din and his Mamluk commanders disgraced. There was talk of a coup, but Fakhr ad-Din having stopped them saved him face for his loyalty to the dynasty. Troops were rushed up to Mansurah, built by al-Kamil on the site of his victory over the Crusaders of 1221. The dying as-Salih Ayyub was carried there in a litter to organize the army. Bedouins conducted guerrilla operations around the walls of Damietta, killing any Frank that strayed outside. The Franks erected dykes and dug ditches to protect the city.

Nile delta

=== Advancement towards Mansurah ===
The Nile waters receded at the end of October 1249, and Alphonse arrived with the reinforcements from France. It was time to advance on Cairo. Peter Maulcerc and the Syrian barons proposed an alternate attack on Alexandria, surprise the Egyptians and control the Mediterranean littoral of Egypt. But Louis’ other brother Robert I of Artois opposed the operation along with the king and, on 20 November 1249, the Frankish army set out from Damietta to Mansurah. A garrison was left to guard the city where the queen and the patriarch Robert of Nantes remained.

Louis' timing of the move was fortuitous. As-Salih Ayyub died on 23 November 1249 after having his leg amputated in an attempt to save his life from a serious abscess. As-Salih did not trust his son al-Muazzam Turanshah and had kept him at a safe distance from Egypt in Hasankeyf. As-Salih's widow, Shajar al-Durr managed to conceal the news of her husband's death, confiding only in the chief eunuch Jamal ad-Din Mohsen and the commander Fakhr ad-Din. She forged a document under his signature which appointed Turanshah as heir and Fakhr ad-Din as viceroy. Mamluk commander Faris ad-Din Aktai was sent to return Turanshah home. (Turanshah's rule would be brief. His mother married al-Malik al-Muizz Aybak, who served as Mamluk ruler of Egypt, as regent to al-Ashraf Musa and later as sultan.) When as-Salih's death was finally revealed, the sultana and viceroy were firmly in charge. But the Franks were encouraged by the news and believed that this government would soon collapse.

The route taken by the Crusaders from Damietta was crossed by numerous canals and branches of the Nile. The largest was the al-Bahr as-Saghit (Ushmum canal), which left the main river just below Mansurah and ran past Ashmun al-Rumman to Lake Manzala, isolating the island of Damietta. Fakhr ad-Din kept the bulk of his forces behind the al-Bahr as-Saghir, and sent his cavalry to harass the Franks as they crossed the canals. There was a battle near Fariskur on 7 December 1249, where the Egyptian cavalry was stopped, and the Templars, against all orders, pursued those retreating. On 14 December, Louis reached the village of Barāmūn, just ten miles to the north of their objective, and the next week encamped on the river banks opposite to Mansurah. On 29 December, Bishop Hugh of Clermont died.

=== Battle of Mansurah ===
For six weeks, the armies of the West and Egypt faced each other on opposite sides of the canal, leading to second Battle of Mansurah that would end on 11 February 1250 with an Ayyubid victory. The Egyptians attempted to attack the Franks in the rear was stopped by Charles I of Anjou. Louis had ordered construction to bridge the waterway, but the resultant enemy bombardment, including the use of Greek fire, caused the work to be abandoned. At one point, an Egyptian Copt came to the camp and offered to reveal the location of a ford across the canal. At the dawn of 8 February, the Crusaders set out across the ford. The king led the advancing army while Hugh IV of Burgundy and Renaud de Vichiers remained to guard the camp. The vanguard was led by Robert I of Artois and supported by the Templars and the English contingent. He was under orders not to attack until directed by the king. Once Robert and his force had crossed the river, he feared that the element of surprise would be lost unless he took the offensive. Despite opposition, Robert attacked the Egyptian camp. The Egyptians were unprepared, still beginning their day, when the Frankish cavalry arrived. The Muslims were slaughtered looking for their weapons, the survivors fleeing to Mansurah. Fakhr ad-Din had just left his bath when he heard the attack, leaping on his horse to ride into the battle. He was cut down by Templar knights.

Having taken the Egyptian camp, Robert's commanders Guillaume de Chateauneuf and William Longespée again cautioned him to wait for the main army to arrive. Determined to finish off the Egyptian army, Robert denounced the Templars and the English as cowards and charged toward the fleeing Egyptians. Although Fakhr ad-Din was dead, his commanders, Qutuz and Rukn ad-Din Baibars, both whom later became Mamluk sultans, restored order to the Egyptians. Strategically placing soldiers in the town, he allowed the Frankish cavalry through the open gate and the Egyptians attacked them from the sidestreets. The horses could not turn in the narrow spaces and were thrown into confusion. The few knights that escaped on foot to the river drowned in its waters. The Templars fell fighting, with only five out of 290 surviving. Among the survivors were the Templar master Guillaume de Sonnac, losing an eye, Humbert V de Beaujeu, constable of France, John II of Soissons, and the duke of Brittany, Peter Maulcerc. Counted with the dead were the king's brother Robert I of Artois, William Longespée and most of his English followers, Peter of Courtenay, and Raoul II of Coucy. The survivors hurried to warn the king.

Upon hearing of the battle at the Egyptian camp, Louis drew up his front line to meet an attack, and sent the engineers to make a bridge over the stream. The crossbowmen had been left on the far side to cover the crossing, and now needed to be brought over on a pontoon nearing completion. The Mamluks soon charged out of the town towards his lines. Keeping his force in reserve while the enemy poured arrows into their ranks, Louis ordered a counterattack as soon as their ammunition ran short. The cavalries of the two sides fought back and forth while trying tried to hinder the building of the pontoon. The pontoon was soon finished and the bowmen crossed over, and the Egyptians retired back into the city. Louis had his victory, but a cost of the loss of much of his force and their commanders, including his younger brother. But the victory would be short-lived.

=== Disaster at Fariskur ===
The situation that Louis found himself in was reminiscent of that of the Fifth Crusade when the Crusader army that had captured Damietta was eventually forced to retreat. He would likely suffer the same fate unless the Egyptians would offer him acceptable terms. On 11 February 1250, the Egyptians attacked again, supported by reinforcements from the south, engaging the Franks in battle. Charles I of Anjou and the Syrian and Cypriot barons at the left held their ground, but the remnants of the Templars and the French nobles at the right wavered, to be rescued by the king. Templar master Guillaume de Sonnac, who had lost an eye at Mansurah, lost the other and died from it. Acting Hospitaller master Jean de Ronay was also killed. Alphonse of Poitiers, guarding the camp was encircled and was rescued by the camp followers. At nightfall, the Muslims gave up the assault and returned to town.

For eight weeks, Louis waited at the Crusader camp, hoping the leadership problem in Cairo would work to his advantage. Instead, on 28 February 1250, Turanshah arrived from Damascus where he had been proclaimed sultan following his father's death. His arrival was the impetus for a new Egyptian offensive. A squadron of light boats were made and transported by camel to the lower portion of the Nile. There they began to intercept the boats that brought food from Damietta, capturing more than eighty Frankish ships. On 16 March 1250 alone, a convoy of thirty-two were lost at one fell swoop. The Franks were quickly beset by famine and disease, including dysentery and typhoid.

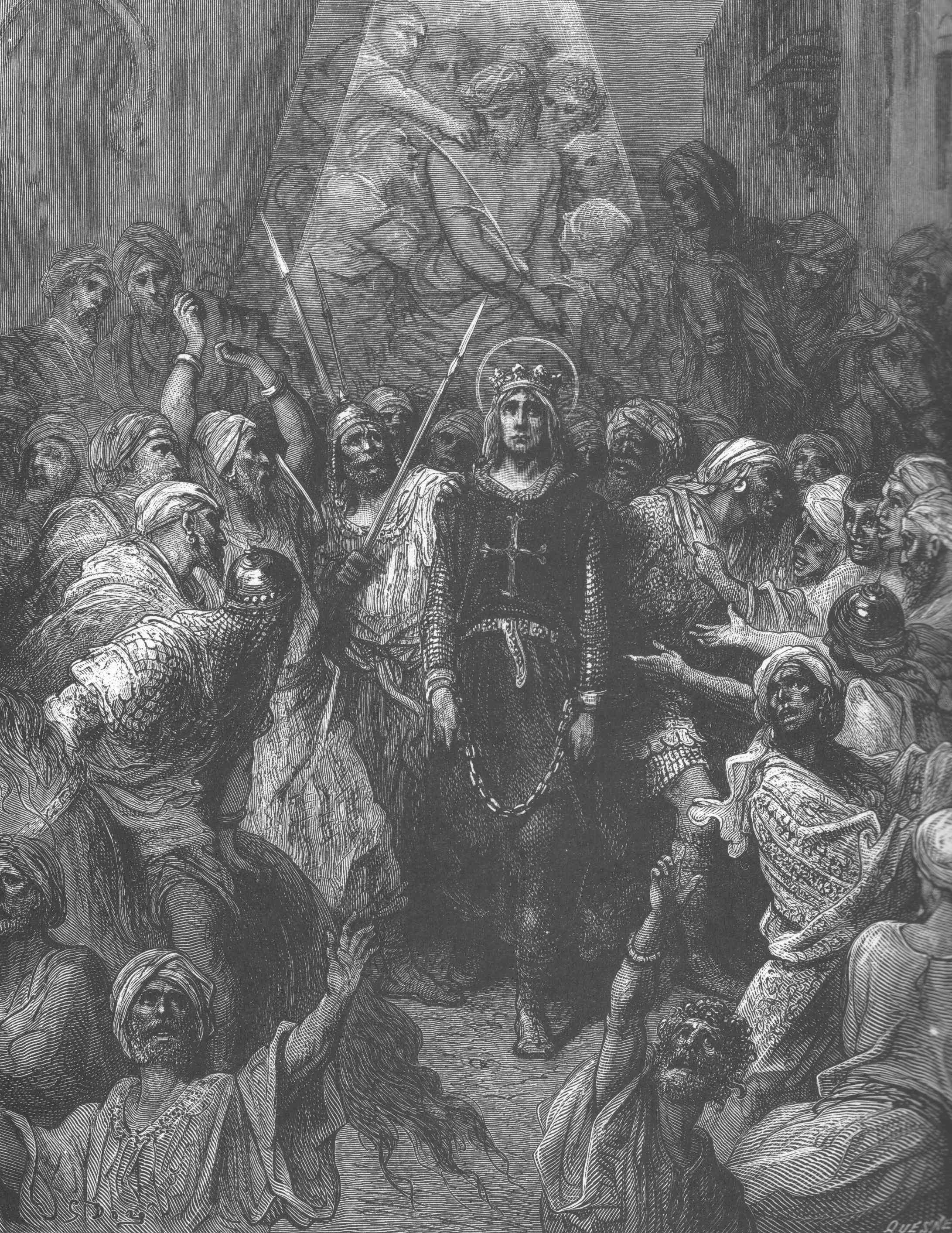
Louis IX being taken prisoner at the Battle of Fariskur (Gustave Doré)

The Battle of Fariskur fought on 6 April 1250 would be the decisive defeat of Louis' army. Louis knew that the army must be extricated to Damietta and began negotiations, offering Turanshah the exchange of Damietta for Jerusalem. The Egyptians realized his disadvantageous position and rejected the offer. In planning their retreat, Louis' officers urged him to go immediately to Damietta. He refused to leave his men. It was decided that the sick should be sent by boat down the Nile and the able-bodied should march along the road by which they had come. They departed on the morning of 5 April, and the painful journey began, with the king in the rear and the Egyptians in pursuit. The Franks managed to get across the al-Bahr as-Saghit, but neglected to destroy the pontoon behind them. The Egyptians crossed over and began attacking the Franks from all sides. Their attacks were repulsed and the Franks moved slowly on, with Louis falling ill that night. The next day, the Muslims surrounded the army at the town of Fariskur, 10 miles southwest of Damietta, and attacked in full force. Hugh XI of Lusignan was among the dead. To the sick and weary soldiers, it was clear that the end had come. Geoffrey of Sergines, commander of the royal bodyguard, sheltered the king at nearby Sharamsah. On 6 April, Louis' surrender was negotiated directly with the sultan by Philip of Montfort. The king and his entourage were taken in chains to Mansurah and his whole army was rounded up and led into captivity. The ships conveying the sick to Damietta were surrounded and captured. The Egyptian victory was total. An agonized Templar knight lamented:

Rage and sorrow are seated in my heart ... so firmly that I scarce dare to stay alive. It seems that God wishes to support the Turks to our loss ... ah, lord God ... alas, the realm of the East has lost so much that it will never be able to rise up again. They will make a Mosque of Holy Mary's convent, and since the theft pleases her Son, who should weep at this, we are forced to comply as well ... Anyone who wishes to fight the Turks is mad, for Jesus Christ does not fight them any more. They have conquered, they will conquer. For every day they drive us down, knowing that God, who was awake, sleeps now, and Muhammad waxes powerful.

=== Louis' captivity and release ===
The Egyptians were surprised by the large number of prisoners taken, estimated by the sultan himself at 30,000, certainly an exaggeration, but likely most of Louis' force. Unable to guard all of them, the infirm were executed immediately, and every day several hundred were decapitated, by order of the sultan. Louis was moved to a private residence in Mansurah and the Crusader leaders were kept together in a larger prison. While they were threatened with death, their value for ransom allowed them to stay alive. Jean de Joinville, on-board one of the captured ships, saved his life by claiming to be the king's cousin. It was later revealed that he was actually the emperor's cousin, which served him well as the prestige of Frederick II among the Egyptians was a plus. When Louis was ordered by the sultan to cede not only Damietta but all the Frankish lands in Syria, he noted that they did not belong to him, but rather to Conrad IV of Germany, the emperor's son. The demand was quickly dropped. The final terms exacted from Louis were harsh. He was to ransom himself by the surrender of Damietta and his army by the payment of a million bezants (later reduced to 800,000). After the terms were agreed to, the king and the barons were taken down the river to Fariskur, where the sultan had taken residence. There they would go on to Damietta, the city to be handed over on 30 April 1250.

That the bargain could be made at all was due in large part to the queen. When Louis began his march on Mansurah, Margaret of Provence was in the later stages of pregnancy and their son John Tristan, the child of sorrow, was born on 8 April, three days after the news came of the surrender of the army. At the same time, she learned that the Pisans and Genoese were planning to evacuate Damietta due to lack of food. She knew that Damietta could not hold without the Italians and she summoned their leaders. If Damietta were to be abandoned, there would be nothing to offer towards the release of her husband. She proposed buying all the food in the city and distributing at an enormous cost, and they agreed to stay, boosting the morale of the city. Soon thereafter, she was moved to Acre, while the Latin patriarch Robert of Nantes went under safe-conduct to complete the arrangements for the ransom with the sultan.

Robert arrived there to find Turanshah dead, murdered on 2 May 1250 in a coup instigated by his stepmother Shajar al-Durr and led by Baibars. Aybak became commander after Turanshah's assassination, later marrying his widow. His safe-conduct guaranteed by Turanshah was viewed as valueless and treated him as a prisoner. Some Mamluks brandished their swords before the king and the captive barons, still covered with the executed sultan's blood. But, in the end, the Egyptians confirmed the agreed-upon terms. When Louis was asked to swear that he would renounce Christ if he failed in his bargain, he refused. On 6 May, Geoffrey of Sergines handed Damietta over to the Muslim vanguard. The king and the nobles were later brought there and Louis set about finding money for the first installment of the ransom, at first coming up short. Until the remainder could be found, the Egyptians held back releasing the king's brother Alphonse. The Templars, known to have a large supply of money, finally agreed to provide what was required. Louis and the barons set sail for Acre, where they arrived on 12 May 1250 after a stormy voyage. Many wounded soldiers had been left behind at Damietta, and contrary to their promise, the Muslims massacred them all.

=== Aftermath of the Egyptian campaign ===
The Seventh Crusade would not end for another four years, but there would be no further battles. In Acre, Louis pursued the release of his imprisoned army and attempted to bring order to an increasingly chaotic Outremer. Louis was the last of the Crusader leaders to actually reach the shores of the eastern Mediterranean, and his failure was keenly felt in the West as well as the Holy Land and Muslim world. When the extent of the disaster reached mainland Europe, unrest in Venice and other Italian cities was reported. France plunged into a sort of public mourning. For many, the grief was immediate and personal; for lost those lost in battle or in captivity. In France reactions took a more aggressive turn, which revealed the extent of popular disenchantment.

The death of Turanshah essentially ended the Ayyubid dynasty begun by Saladin. Shajar al-Durr was not accepted by the Abbasid caliph al-Musta'sim in Baghdad. Shajar, who had married her commander Aybak, then abdicated and passed the throne to her husband. Aybak's formal rule ended after just five days. The Bahri Mamluks that essentially controlled Egypt at this point installed as sultan the 6-year-old al-Ashraf Musa. Nevertheless, the actual power in Egypt was still exercised by Aybak, who had returned to his position of atabeg. Egypt would remain a Mamluk sultanate through 1517.

Henry III of England took the Cross with many of his subjects in the spring of 1250 but convinced the pope to postpone any expedition. Louis’ brothers refused to send help from France where public opinion was indignant but disillusioned. The French nobles contented themselves with bitter comments against the pope who preferred to preach a crusade against the Christian Imperialists rather than to send help to those who were struggling against the infidel. On 13 December 1250, Frederick II, who remained respected in Muslim circles, died in Italy. His son Conrad II of Jerusalem lacked the emperor's prestige but inherited the pope's crusade against his father. Blanche of Castile went so far as to confiscate the property of any royal vassal who responded to the appeal of Innocent IV for a crusade against Conrad in 1251. But neither she nor her advisers ventured to send reinforcements to the East.

== The Shepherds' Crusade ==
The Shepherds’ Crusade (Crucesignatio pastorellorum) of 1251 was a popular crusade of poor shepherds and peasants from the Low Countries and northern France who set out with the objective of aiding the captive Louis IX and rescuing the Holy Land from the infidels. After his release from the Egyptians, Louis sent his brothers to France to obtain relief and his mother Blanche of Castile, acting as regent, endeavoured in vain to find reinforcements as neither the noblemen nor the clergy would help. At this juncture the citizens rose up, announcing that they would go to the king's rescue. At Eastertime 1251, a mysterious person known as the Le Maître de Hongrie (Master of Hungary) began to preach a crusade to the shepherds in the north of France, always holding a map supposedly given to him by the Virgin Mary. He drew large crowds and allowed them to take the cross without papal authorization.

The movement spread rapidly and soon an army of the Pastoureaux of nearly 60,000 men was formed, carrying a banner on which was depicted the Blessed Virgin appearing to the Master of Hungary. The army soon showed themselves hostile to the clergy, especially to the Dominicans, whom they accused of having induced the king to go to the Holy Land. A host of less-than-desirable men and women soon joined their ranks, and with growing audacity attacked clerics and preached against the bishops and even the pope. Blanche imagined that she could send the Pastoureaux to the relief of her son, and met with the master, providing him with gifts. Emboldened, the Pastoureaux entered Paris with predictable mayhem. After Paris, they divided into several armies which spread terror across France. Blanche finally realized that she had been mistaken and commanded the royal officers to arrest and destroy them. A troop of citizens pursued and halted them near Villeneuve-sur-Cher. The Master of Hungary was slain, together with a large number of his followers, ending one of the most curious of the popular movements.

== Louis at Acre, 1250–1254 ==
After his arrival at Acre, Louis reviewed his future plans. His mother had urged his speedy return to France given unrest among the populace and other urgent problems. But he felt that he should stay. His disastrous crusade had destroyed both the French and Outremer armies. It was also his duty to remain at hand until the last of the prisoners in Egypt was released. On 3 July he publicly announced his decision to stay. A letter was sent to the nobles of France telling of his decision and asking for reinforcements for the Crusade. He had felt bitterly the failure of his great effort with the loss of thousands of lives.

=== De facto ruler of the kingdom ===
The king's brothers and the leading nobles of the Crusade sailed from Acre in mid-July, leaving an army of about 1400 men in the Holy Land. The queen remained with the king and their son John Tristan; she gave birth to another son, Peter, in 1251 and a daughter, Blanche, in 1253. He was the de facto ruler of the kingdom, especially after Frederick's death, even though the throne was legitimately that of Conrad IV of Germany, who would never now come to the East. The regency had passed from Alice of Champagne to her son Henry I of Cyprus. He had, in turn, nominated his cousin John of Arsuf as bailli, who handed over the government to Louis. He was far more successful in handling the citizens of Outremer than Frederick had been. He successfully resolved the Antiochean crisis after the death of Bohemond V of Antioch on 17 January 1252. Bohemond VI of Antioch, aged fifteen, succeeded at the principality under the regency of his mother Lucia of Segni, who handed the governing to her Italian relatives. Bohemond VI, knowing of his mother's unpopularity petitioned the pope, with Louis’ approval, to come of age a few months before the legal date. Innocent IV agreed and Bohemond was knighted by the king at Acre, with Lucienne removed from power. At the same time Louis completed the reconciliation of Antioch and Armenia, erasing previous bad relations with Hethum I of Armenia. In 1254, on Louis’ suggestion, Bohemond VI married the Armenian king's daughter Sibylla, essentially becoming a vassal of his father-in-law's and getting the Armenians to share in the protection of Antioch.

Henry I of Cyprus died on 18 January 1253, leaving as heir his son, Hugh II of Cyprus, only a few months old. His widow, Plaisance of Antioch, claimed the regency of both Cyprus and of Jerusalem. The barons of Outremer required her attendance in person before they would recognize regency and John of Arsuf, remained meanwhile as bailli, and Plaisance would eventually marrying his son Balian of Arsuf. But, in reality, Louis continued to administer the government.

=== Negotiations for the prisoners ===
His experience in Egypt, tempered by his current lack of an armed force, led him to consider diplomatic relations with the Muslims. The time was favorable for diplomacy as the Mamluk takeover in Egypt was not well received in Syria, with their strong loyalties to the Ayyubids. Following Turanshah's death, an-Nasir Yusuf conducted a friendly takeover of Damascus on 9 July 1250. The resultant rivalry between Cairo and Damascus served Louis well with both eager for aid from the Franks. Shortly after he arrived at Acre, Louis received an embassy from an-Nasir Yusuf, but he remained noncommittal. An Acre-Damascene alliance might be strategically preferable, but he had to consider that men that were still imprisoned in Egypt.

The Damascene army of an-Nasir Yusuf invaded Egypt and encountered the Egyptian army under Aybak on 2 February 1251 near Zagazig. The Syrians were at first successful, but one of their regiments of Mamluks deserted in the midst of the battle. Yusuf, not known for his courage, fled back to Damascus. Mamluk power in Egypt was saved, but the Ayyubids still held Palestine and Syria. When Yusuf contacted Acre proposing that he might trade Jerusalem in return for Frankish help, Louis sent an embassy to Cairo under John of Valenciennes warning Aybak that unless the question of the Frankish prisoners was soon settled he would ally himself with Damascus. His ploy succeeded in securing the release of some 3000 captives, including Hospitaller master Guillaume de Chateauneuf, taken in 1244 at Gaza, in exchange for 300 Muslim prisoners. Louis then demanded the release of all remaining prisoners remaining without payment of the second installment of his ransom. Aybek, realizing that Louis' envoy was visiting Damascus, consented in return for a military alliance against Yusuf. He further promised the return of the pre-1187 kingdom as far east as the Jordan. Louis accepted the offer and the prisoners were released in March 1252. The Templars stubbornly refused to break off relations with Damascus and Louis was forced to rebuke them publicly and demand an apology.

When an-Nasir Yusuf learned of the treaty, he deployed his troops between the two now-allies, in Gaza. Louis moved his troops to Jaffa but the Mamluks failed to advance out of Egypt. For a year, the Syrians and the Franks remained deadlocked, neither wishing a battle. In the meantime, Louis repaired the fortifications of Jaffa as had done for those of Acre, Haifa and Caesarea. Early in 1253, Yusuf asked Baghdad to mediate between him and the Mamluks. Al-Musta'sim wished to unite the Muslim world against the Mongols, and he asked Aybak to accept Damascus’ terms. Aybak was recognized as sultan of Egypt and allowed to annex most of Palestine. The peace was signed in April 1253 and the previous arrangement with the Franks, including return of kingdom territory, was long forgotten. Nonetheless, neither Muslim leader showed any further desire for war with the Franks.

=== The Assassins and the Mongols ===
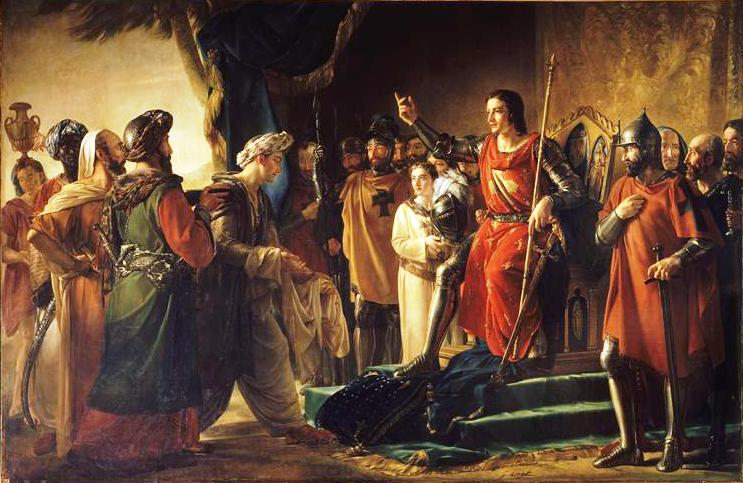
Saint Louis receiving the envoy of the Old Man of the Mountain. Painting by Georges Rouget in 1819.

There was no support from the West for a continued Crusade and in his search for foreign allies, Louis looked to two unlikely sources: the Assassins and the Mongols. The chief da'i of the Assassins in Syria was Radi ad-Din Abu'l-Ma'āli. After the Franks' disaster at Damietta, Radi brazenly demanded from Acre compensation for their neutrality and, in particular, to be released from their tribute paid to the Hospitallers. He was rebuffed and next pragmatically sent a humbler embassy, bringing gifts for the king, and requesting a close alliance. Louis, learning of the hostility of the Isma'ili sect towards the more orthodox Sunni Muslims, encouraged their advances and a pact of mutual defense was concluded. Louis’ main diplomatic initiative was to secure the friendship of the Mongols, an enemy of the Assassins. Early in 1253, Louis learned that a Mongol prince, Sartaq, son of Batu Khan, had been converted to Christianity. He immediately sent a contingent led by the Dominican William of Rubruck to urge Sartaq to come to the aid of his fellow Christians in Syria. But it was not within the power of such a junior Mongol prince to conclude such an alliance and no further contract would occur prior to Louis' departure from the Holy Land.

=== Louis returns home ===
While the Dominicans journeyed further into Asia to the court of Möngke Khan, Louis decided to return home. His mother had died on 27 November 1252, and her death was quickly followed by disarray in his kingdom. Henry III again began to make trouble, despite his oath to go on crusade, and he would not support his bishops whom Innocent IV had charged with preaching the crusade. Civil unrest was rampant, with the War of the Flemish Succession and many of the vassals of France growing restive. Louis’ duty was to his own kingdom in France and he prepared to return home. He and his family sailed from Acre on 24 April 1254. His boat was nearly wrecked off the coast of Cyprus and later was nearly destroyed by fire. In July, the royal party landed at Hyeres, in the territory of the king's brother, Charles I of Anjou. The Seventh Crusade was over, again having accomplished nothing but the loss of lives and treasure.

== Aftermath ==
The Seventh Crusade had involved Outremer in a terrible military catastrophe. Although Louis' four years at Acre did much to repair the damage, the loss of manpower would never be recovered. His coming to the East had been simultaneously unfortunate and necessary, but his departure brought the risk of immediate harm. He left behind him as his representative Geoffrey of Sergines as seneschal to the kingdom. The bailli of the kingdom was now John of Ibelin, Count of Jaffa and Ascalon, who had succeeded his cousin John of Arsuf. The latter John was likely in Cyprus, advising Plaisance, legal regent of both kingdoms. The death of Conrad II of Jerusalem on 21 May 1254 resulted in his two-year-old son Conradin becoming the king of Jerusalem, albeit nominally. As one of his last official acts, Louis arranged a multi-year truce with Damascus beginning 21 February 1254, as an-Nasir Yusuf was justifyably concerned about the Mongol peril and had no wish for war with the Franks. Aybak of Egypt also wished to avoid war and in 1255 made a ten years’ truce with the Franks. Jaffa was expressly excluded from the truce, as the sultan wished to secure it as a port for his Palestinian province. The frontier between the parties were subject to constant raids and counter-raids. In January 1256, the Franks captured a large caravan of pack animals. When the Mamluk governor of Jerusalem led an expedition in March to punish the raiders, he was defeated and killed. Aybak made a new treaty with Damascus, again with the caliph's mediation, ceding Palestine. Both Muslim powers renewed their truces with the Franks, to last ten years and to cover the territory of Jaffa.

The Ayyubid dynasty would essentially end with the Siege of Aleppo from 18 to 24 January 1260 in which the Mongols completed their invasion of the Levant. Later that year, on 3 September 1260, the Mamluks defeated the Mongols at the Battle of Ain Jalut, halting the advance of the Ilkhanate. As the Mamluk dynasty grew in power under Baibars, Louis IX petitioned Clement IV, elected pope in 1265, to go on yet another expedition, the Eighth Crusade.

== Participants ==
A partial list of those that participated in the Seventh Crusade can be found in the category collections of Christians of the Seventh Crusade and Muslims of the Seventh Crusade.

== Literary response ==
The failure of the Seventh Crusade engendered several poetic responses from the Occitan troubadours. Austorc d'Aorlhac, composing shortly after the Crusade, was surprised that God would allow Louis IX to be defeated, but not surprised that some Christians would therefore convert to Islam.

In a later poem, D'un sirventes m'es gran voluntatz preza, Bernart de Rovenac attacks both James I of Aragon and Henry III of England for neglecting to defend their fiefs that the rei que conquer Suria ( the king who conquered Syria) had possessed. The rei que conquer Suria is a mocking reference to Louis, who was still in Syria in 1254 when Bernart was writing, probably in hopes that the English and Aragonese kings would take advantage of the French monarch's absence.

Raoul de Soissons, a trouvère who travelled with the Crusader force wrote several chanson dedicated to Charles I of Anjou. However, Bertran d'Alamanon criticized Charles' neglect of Provence in favor of crusading. He wrote one of his last works, which bemoans Christendom's decline overseas, between the Seventh and Eighth Crusades, c.1260–1265.

== Primary sources ==
The 19th-century French work Recueil des historiens des croisades (RHC) documents several of the original narrative sources of the Seventh Crusade from Latin and Arabic authors. The documents are presented in their original language with French translations. A complete bibliography can be found in The Routledge Companion to the Crusades. See also Crusade Texts in Translation and Selected Sources: The Crusades, in Fordham University's Internet Medieval Sourcebook.

The primary Western sources of the Seventh Crusade, including eyewitness accounts, are as follows.

- Life of Saint Louis, by Jean de Joinville (1224–1317), a French chronicler who accompanied Louis IX of France.
- Memoirs of the Crusades. Translation by British biographer Frank Marzials, consisting of the chronicle De la Conquête de Constantinople of Geoffrey of Villehardouin and Joinville's Life of Saint Louis.
- Rothelin Continuation of William of Tyre's work. In RHC Historiens occidentaux, Volume 2.2, with a modern translation by Janet Shirley.
- Roman des rois (Romance of Kings) by Primat of Saint-Denis.
- Chronica Majora, by English historian Matthew Paris.
- Lettres françaises du XIIIe siècle. Letters from the crusade by Jean Pierre Sarrasin, chamberlain to Louis IX of France.
- Ystoria Mongalorum, by Italian explorer and diplomat John of Plano Carpini (Giovanni da Pian del Carpine).

The Arabic sources of the Seventh Crusade include the following.

- The Concise History of Humanity, by Abu al-Fida. Summarized in RHC Historiens orientaux, Volume 3.1
- Kitāb al-Khiṭaṭ al-Maqrīzīyah, by al-Maqrizi. Portions on the Seventh Crusade excerpted in the Internet History Sourcebook and in Chronicles of the Crusades.
- History of the Ayyubit and Mameluke Rulers, by al-Maqrizi.
- Al-Nujūm al-Zāhirah fī Mulūk Miṣr wa-al-Qāhirah, by Ibn Taghri.

== See also ==
- Crusader states
- Eighth Crusade – also launched against Egypt in 1270 by Louis IX
- Kingdom of Jerusalem
- Jean de Joinville – an account of the life of Louis IX and the logistics of the Seventh Crusade
- 1248 in France

== Bibliography ==
- Archer, Thomas Andrew (1904). The Crusades: The Story of the Latin Kingdom of Jerusalem. Putnam.
- Asbridge, Thomas (2012). The Crusades: The War for the Holy Land. Simon & Schuster. ISBN 978-1-84983-688-3.
- Barber, Malcolm (2012). The New Knighthood. A History of the Order of the Temple. Cambridge University Press. ISBN 978-1107604735.
- Bartlett, W. B. (2007). The Last Crusade: The Seventh Crusade and the Final Battle for the Holy Land. Tempus. ISBN 9780752443898.
- Bohn, Henry G. (1848). Chronicles of the Crusades. Bohn's antiquarian library. H. G. Bohn, London.
- Carolus-Barré, Louis (1976). Septième centenaire de la mort de Saint Louis. Actes des Colloques de Royaumont et de Paris.
- Cazel, Fred A. Jr. (1969). Financing the Crusades (PDF). A History of the Crusades (Setton), Volume VI. Archived from the original (PDF) on 26 March 2023.
- Dawson, Christopher (1955). The Mongol Mission: Narratives and Letters of the Franciscan Missionaries in Mongolia and China in the Thirteenth and Fourteenth Centuries. Sheed and Ward. ISBN 9780758139252.
- Delaville Le Roulx, Joseph (1904). Les Hospitaliers en Terre Sainte et à Chypre (1100–1310). E. Leroux, Paris.
- Fulton, Michael S. (2018). Artillery in the Era of the Crusades. Brill Publications. ISBN 9789004349452.
- Furber, Elizabeth Chapin (1969). The Kingdom of Cyprus, 1191–1291 (PDF). A History of the Crusades (Setton), Volume II. Archived from the original (PDF) on 26 March 2023.
- Gibb, H. A. R. (1969). The Aiyūbids (PDF). A History of the Crusades (Setton), Volume II. Archived from the original (PDF) on 10 June 2022.
- Hamilton, Bernard (1980). The Latin Church in the Crusader States: The Secular Church. Variorum Publications. ISBN 978-0860780724.
- Hardwicke, Mary Nickerson (1969). The Crusader States, 1192–1243 (PDF). A History of the Crusades (Setton), Volume II. Archived from the original (PDF) on 28 March 2024.
- Howarth, Stephen (1982). Knights Templar. Marboro Books, New York. ISBN 9780002164528.
- Humphreys, R. Stephen (1977). From Saladin to the Mongols: The Ayyubids of Damascus, 1193–1260. State University of New York. ISBN 978-0873952637.
- Irwin, Robert (1986). The Middle East in the Middle Ages: The Early Mamluk Sultanate, 1250–1382. Southern Illinois University Press. ISBN 9781597400480.
- Jackson, Peter (2007). The Seventh Crusade, 1244–1254: Sources and Documents. Ashgate. ISBN 9780754669234.
- Jordan, William (1979). Louis IX and the Challenge of the Crusade: A Study in Rulership. Princeton University Press. ISBN 9780691635453.
- Keen, Maurice (1999). Medieval Warfare. Oxford University Press. ISBN 9780198206392.
- Lane-Poole, Stanley (1901). History of Egypt in the Middle Ages. A History of Egypt; v. 6. Methuen, London. ISBN 9780790532042.
- Lapina, Elizabeth (2017). "Crusades, Memory and Visual Culture: Representations of the Miracle of Intervention of Saints in Battle". In Megan Cassidy-Welch (ed.). Remembering the Crusades and Crusading. Routledge. pp. 49–72.
- Lock, Peter (2006). The Routledge Companion to the Crusades. Routledge. doi:10.4324/9780203389638. ISBN 0-415-39312-4.
- Maalouf, Amin (2006). The Crusades through Arab Eyes. Saqi Books. ISBN 9780863560231.
- Maier, Christoph T. (1998). Preaching the Crusades: Mendicant Friars and the Cross in the Thirteenth Century. Cambridge University Press. ISBN 0-521-45246-5.
- Marzials, Frank (1908). Memoirs of the Crusades. Everyman's library. History; no. 333. J. M. Dent, London.
- Murray, Alan V. (2006). The Crusades – An Encyclopedia. ABC-CLIO. ISBN 978-1-57607-862-4. Archived from the original on 26 March 2023.
- Oman, Charles (1924). A History of the Art of War in the Middle Ages. Metheun.
- Perry, Guy (2018). The Briennes: The Rise and Fall of a Champenois Dynasty in the Age of the Crusades, c. 950–1356. Cambridge University Press. ISBN 978-1107196902.
- Phillips, Jonathan (2009). Holy Warriors: A Modern History of the Crusades. Random House. ISBN 9780224079372.
- Richard, Jean C. (1992). Saint Louis, Crusader King of France. Cambridge University Press. ISBN 9780521381567.
- Richard, Jean C. (1999). The Crusades, c. 1071 – c. 1291. Cambridge University Press. ISBN 978-0-521-62566-1.
- Riley-Smith, Jonathan (1973). The Feudal Nobility and the Kingdom of Jerusalem, 1174–1277. Macmillan. ISBN 978-0333063798.
- Roux, Jean-Paul (1993). Histoire de l'Empire mongol. Fayard. ISBN 9782213031644.
- Runciman, Steven (1954). A History of the Crusades, Volume Three: The Kingdom of Acre and the Later Crusades. Cambridge University Press. ISBN 9780521347723.
- Runciman, Steven (1969). The Crusader States, 1243–1291 (PDF). A History of the Crusades (Setton), Vol. II. Archived from the original (PDF) on 18 October 2021.
- Setton, Kenneth M. (1969). A History of the Crusades. University of Wisconsin Press.
- Shirley, Janet (1999). Crusader Syria in the Thirteenth Century: The Rothelin Continuation of the History of William of Tyre with Part of the Eracles. Routledge. ISBN 9781032180229.
- Smith, Caroline (2006). Crusading in the Age of Joinville. Ashgate Publishing. ISBN 978-0754653639.
- Strayer, Joseph (1969). The Crusades of Louis IX (PDF). A History of the Crusades (Setton), Volume II. Archived from the original (PDF) on 7 December 2021.
- Tyerman, Christopher (1996). England and the Crusades, 1095–1588. University of Chicago Press. ISBN 0-226-82012-2.
- Tyerman, Christopher (2006). God's War: A New History of the Crusades. Belknap Press. ISBN 978-0-674-02387-1.
- Whalen, Brett Edward (2019). The Two Powers: The Papacy, the Empire, and the Struggle for Sovereignty in the Thirteenth Century. University of Pennsylvania Press. ISBN 978-0812250862.
- Wolff, Robert Lee (1969). The Latin Empire of Constantinople, 1204–1312 (PDF). A History of the Crusades (Setton), Vol. II. Archived from the original (PDF) on 26 March 2023.
- Ziyādaẗ, Muḥammad Muṣṭafā (1969). The Mamluk Sultans to 1293 (PDF). A History of the Crusades (Setton), Vol. II. Archived from the original (PDF) on 14 June 2020.
- Jackson, Peter (2007). The Seventh Crusade, 1244–1254: Sources and Documents. Ashgate Publishing. ISBN 978-0-7546-6923-4.
- Morton, Nicholas (2009). The Teutonic Knights in the Holy Land, 1190-1291 (PDF). Boydell Press. ISBN 978-1-843834779.
- Heath, Ian (1978). Armies and Enemies of the Crusades 1096-1291. Wargames Research Group. ISBN 978-0-904417081.
