= 1249 in France =

- Decades: 1220s; 1230s; 1240s; 1250s; 1260s
- See also: History of France; Timeline of French history; List of years in France

1249 in France included the following events in French history:

== Siege of Damietta ==
The Siege of Damietta took place in 1249 and was a victory for the Seventh Crusaders.
