= William of Sonnac =

Grand Master of the Knights Templar

Grand Master of the Knights Templar
- In office 1247–1250
- Preceded by: Richard de Bures
- Succeeded by: Renaud de Vichiers

Personal details
- Born: Rouergue, France
- Died: 6 April 1250 Faraskur, Egypt

Military service
- Allegiance: Knights Templar
- Battles/wars: Seventh Crusade; Siege of Damietta; Battle of Mansurah; Battle of Fariskur †

William of Sonnac (French: Guillaume; died 6 April 1250) was Grand Master of the Knights Templar from 1247 to 1250.

== Personal life ==
William was born to a noble family in the French region of Rouergue. No date of birth survives for the grand master. He was described by Matthew Paris as "a discreet and circumspect man, who was also skilled and experienced in the affairs of war".

William was an established member of the order before his election as grand master. He was the preceptor of Aquitaine in France for the Templars and arrived in the Holy Land around autumn of 1247, finding "the remnants of the Kingdom of Jerusalem in a precarious state. Grand Master Armand de Périgord had been taken prisoner at the Battle of La Forbie in 1244, and after negotiations for his release failed two years later, William was proposed as a replacement. Before his first year in the East was out, he was the order's new leader.

== Military record ==
=== The Seventh Crusade ===
William's tenure was a particularly violent one. By 1247, the Christians had lost power bases in Tiberias, Mount Tabor, Belvoir and Ascalon. This prompted a fresh campaign from King Louis IX of France, who landed at Limassol, Cyprus on 17 September 1248. William sailed from Acre to meet him and make preparations. Shortly after, the new grand master received an emir from Sultan As-Salih Ayyub, offering the crusaders a peace deal. William related this to the French king, who ordered him to cease any negotiations without gaining Royal permission first. This ensured the new campaign would be concluded with violence, not diplomacy.

=== The Siege Of Damietta ===
On 5 June 1249, the French crusader army, combined with William and his Templar knights, attempted to land in Egypt. They targeted Damietta, just as the Fifth Crusade had years earlier. Fighting on the Egyptian beaches was heavy and the King fought in waist-high water alongside the troops. After a prolonged battle, the Muslims were forced to retreat, leaving the city almost undefended. The next day, William wrote to Robert of Sandford, telling how on the morning after the battle, Damietta had been seized with only one crusader casualty.

At the end of November, William and King Louis began their march to Cairo, via Mansurah.

=== Battle of Mansurah ===
William's next engagement was at the Battle of Mansurah, for the city containing the area's defensive force, the last obstacle to central Egypt. The Muslims had been protected by the swollen Nile, but on 8 February 1250, a local Bedouin showed them where they could cross. William, Robert I of Artois, the king's brother and William II Longespee, leader of the English troops, launched an assault on the Muslim force without the main Frankish army. Taken by surprise, the Egyptians quickly retreated from the riverbank into the city and the Count foolishly gave chase, outnumbered and with no back-up from the bulk of the French forces.

John of Joinville claimed that the Count meant to follow on his own and that the rest of the raiding party did so as to not look cowardly. The Templars "thought that they would be dishonored if they allowed the Count to go before them". However, another source, Matthew Paris, reported that William was forced into the assault by the Count. Robert was "bellowing and swearing disgracefully as is the French custom", and blaming the Templars and other religious orders for causing the real downfall of the Kingdom. Disgusted, William returned to his men and prepared to chase down the numerically superior enemy.

Whatever the fact, the three commanders charged into Mansurah with tired men and no reinforcements and were quickly drawn into heavy fighting. Completely surrounded, "like an island in the sea", William refused to surrender and his Templars fought to the last man. Earl Longespee was killed in the fighting, and the Count either fell in combat or drowned fleeing to safety. William's escape from the city would make him a famous warrior, when many had considered him more suited to diplomacy. With heavy wounds, only one eye and two remaining knights of the original 280, he fought through the Egyptian army and out of the city, where he found the main Frankish army. He refused to rest and after receiving medical attention he returned and helped repulse a Muslim raiding party.

=== Battle of Fariskur ===
The Christian forces camped outside the city and were under constant attack. A major assault was launched by the Muslims on 6 April and William joined the Frankish charge to meet the enemy. He fought along the riverbank until he was finally overwhelmed by the attackers. Blinded fully by a second injury to the head, he was hacked down and killed by Muslim troops.

Next to the troops of Walter of Châtillon was brother Sonnac, Master of the Templars, with those few brothers that had survived Tuesday's battle. He had built a defence in front of him with the Saracen engines which we had captured. When the Saracens came to attack him, they threw Greek fire onto the barrier he had made; and the fire caught easily, for the Templars had put a large quantity of deal planks there. And you should know that the Turks did not wait for the fire to burn itself out, but rushed upon the Templars among the scorching flames. And in this battle, Brother William (Guillaume), Master of the Templars, lost an eye; and he had lost the other on the previous Shrove Tuesday; and that Lord died as a consequence, may God absolve him! And you should know that there was at least an acre of land behind the Templars, which was so covered with arrows fired by the Saracens, that none of the ground could be seen

His death and the capture of Louis IX marked an end to the seventh crusade. He was succeeded as grand master by Renaud de Vichiers.

== Chronicler ==
William was the first grand master to formally record the intricacies of the Templar hierarchy. He added this to existing archives, codified them and stored them in a safe place so that the order would have accurate records in future years. It is certainly ironic that, for a man responsible for creating the order's most in-depth records, there is no indication of when he was born.

== In fiction ==
William is a prominent character in Crusades, a graphic novel by Izu, Alex Nikolavitch, and Zhang Xiaoyu, published by Les Humanoïdes Associés, in which he is shown as a power hungry plotter.

Religious titles
Preceded by Richard de Bures	Grand Master of the Knights Templar; 1247–1250	Succeeded by Renaud de Vichiers
