= Simeon Rabban Ata =

Simeon, called Rabban Ata, was a high representative of Syriac Christianity in the 13th century. He was apparently a monk from the Far East and had been put in charge by the Khan of protecting Christians.

Simeon Rabban Ata was nominated as a sort of high-commissioner in charge of Christian affairs in Iran by Ogodei, and confirmed in this role by the Khan Guyuk. He is also described as the Nestorian "visitor" to the Near East, who was in charge of Christian affairs in South-West Asia. Simeon met Chormagan equipped with considerable powers so that freedom of faith could be respected in Iran, a policy which effectively protected Christianity in an Islamic land. Simeon was praised by Christians in the Mongol Empire, and seems to have been in charge of establishing Christian churches in the realm:

"He brought them a lot of relief, saving them from death and servitude. He built churches where previously even pronouncing the name of Christ was forbidden, especially in Tabriz and Nakhichevan (...) where he raised crosses. Even the generals offered him presents"

— Kirakos Gandzaketsi.

He played an important role in establishing exchanges with the Mongols, and visited the Mongol court in 1235–1240. He also had the role of an intermediary between Eastern and Western Christianity, and was able to write advice to the Pope: he even suggested him that he should make peace with Frederick II, Holy Roman Emperor. Simeon is also known to have sent to the Pope a libellus which he had brought from “the country of Sin”. He was also an intermediary in the efforts at unifying the Eastern and Western churches: he transmitted to the Pope a profession of faith by the Jacobite patriarch Ignatius II in 1247, and gave to André de Longjumeau a letter in which the primacy of Rome was being recognized.

Simeon met and had conversations with André de Longjumeau and Ascelin on the way to their missions to the Mongol realm in 1245, in the city of Tabriz.

His accounts were reported by Vincent de Beauvais in his Speculum Historiale. The Armenian historian Kirakos Gandzaketsi wrote an apology about him and his role in establishing relations with the Mongols.
