= André de Montbard =

Fifth Grand Master of the Knights Templar

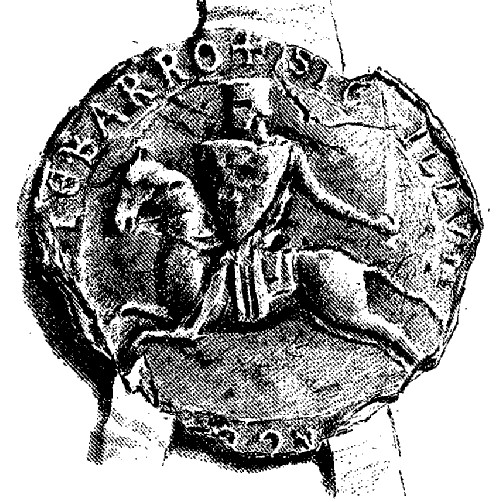

5th Grand Master of the Knights Templar
- In office 1153–1156
- Preceded by: Bernard de Tremelay
- Succeeded by: Bertrand de Blanchefort

Personal details
- Born: 5 November c. 1097 Burgundy
- Died: 17 January 1156 Jerusalem, Kingdom of Jerusalem

Military service
- Allegiance: Knights Templar
- Years of service: 1129–1156
- Rank: Seneschal (before 1153); Grand Master (1153–1156)
- Battles/wars: Siege of Ascalon

Coat of arms of André de Montbard

André de Montbard (5 November c. 1097 – 17 January 1156) was the fifth Grand Master of the Knights Templar and also one of the founders of the Order.

The Montbard family came from the high nobility in Burgundy, and André was an uncle of St. Bernard of Clairvaux, being a half-brother of Bernard's mother Aleth de Montbard. She had married Tescelin Sorus, a knight, the father of Bernard. He entered the Order in 1129 and went to Palestine, where he quickly rose to the rank of seneschal, deputy and second-in-command to the Grand Master. After the Siege of Ascalon on 22 August 1153, André was elected Grand Master to replace Bernard de Tremelay, who had been killed during an assault on the city on 16 August.

He died on 17 January 1156, in Jerusalem and was succeeded by Bertrand de Blanchefort.

== Notes ==
Religious titles
Preceded by Bernard de Tremelay	Grand Master of the Knights Templar; 1153–1156	Succeeded by Bertrand de Blanchefort
