= Bertrand de Blanchefort =

6th Grand Master of the Knights Templar (c. 1109–1169)

6th Grand Master of the Knights Templar
- In office 1157–1169
- Preceded by: André de Montbard
- Succeeded by: Philip of Nablus

Personal details
- Born: c. 1109
- Died: 13 January 1169

Military service
- Allegiance: Knights Templar
- Battles/wars: Battle of Lake Huleh; Crusader invasion of Egypt

Bertrand de Blanchefort (or Blanquefort), (c. 1109 – 13 January 1169) was the sixth Grand Master of the Knights Templar, from 1156 until his death in 1169. He is known as a great reformer of the order.

== Personal life ==
He was born around 1109, although no exact date is recorded. The Obituary at Reims gives his death as 2 January 1169. He was the youngest of a family of boys, the children of Lord Godfrey de Blanchefort of Guyenne. He trained in combat from a young age, but during his time as Grand Master, placed more emphasis on reform and negotiation. This helped to foster the Templars image as guardians, not brutes.

== Military record ==
His earliest action as Grand Master was with Baldwin III of Jerusalem, with whom he fought against Nur ad-Din Zangi. However, he was taken prisoner after King Baldwin was defeated at Banyas in 1157. The defeat allowed an ambush to be set for Blanchefort, who had dismissed his Frankish soldiers after battle ceased. He was held in captivity for three years in Aleppo before being released to Byzantine emperor Manuel I Comnenus when the emperor made peace with Nur ad-Din.

Bertrand accompanied King Amalric I during the expedition against Egypt in 1163. The expedition ended in failure, despite the considerable numbers the Christians could draw upon. Bertrand refused to participate in a second expedition in 1168, as heavy losses were almost certain. He was succeeded by Philip of Milly.

== Reform ==
Blanchefort petitioned the Pope to use the title, "Master by Grace of God", which fitted the Templar's position as rising stars in the church, a favor which Rome gladly granted. His internal reforms were more important however. He wrote the "Retraits", which established structure within the order. This meant knights had clearer roles and protocols. He also established checks within the leaderships of the order, which stopped future Grand Masters deciding the direction of the Templars, without the backing of the knights. His work on creating negotiating roles within the order is also worth noting. After the failed expedition to Egypt, it was the Templars that helped draw up a peace treaty.

== In popular culture ==
From the 1960s onwards it has erroneously been asserted that Bertrand de Blanchefort was related to a family of the same name located near Rennes-le-Château This erroneous assertion was first discredited in France in 1984.

== Notes ==
Religious titles
Preceded by André de Montbard	Grand Master of the Knights Templar; 1156–1169	Succeeded by Philippe de Milly
