= Bernard de Tremelay =

Fourth Grand Master of the Knights Templar

4th Grand Master of the Knights Templar
- In office 1152–1153
- Preceded by: Everard des Barres
- Succeeded by: André de Montbard

Personal details
- Born: Unknown Saint-Claude, France
- Died: 16 August 1153 Ascalon, Fatimid Caliphate

Military service
- Allegiance: Knights Templar
- Battles/wars: Siege of Ascalon †

Bernard de Tramelay (died 16 August 1153) was the fourth Grand Master of the Knights Templar, serving from 1152 until his death at the Siege of Ascalon.

== Early life and career ==
He was born in the castle of Tramelay near Saint-Claude in the Jura. According to Du Cange, he succeeded a certain Hugues as Master of the Temple, although this Hugues is otherwise unknown. He was elected Grand Master in 1152, after the abdication of Everard des Barres, who had retired to the monastery at Clairvaux in France following the Second Crusade. King Baldwin III of Jerusalem granted him the ruined city of Gaza, which Bernard rebuilt for the Templars.

== Siege of Ascalon ==
In 1153 the Templars participated in the Battle of Ascalon, a fortress at that time controlled by Fatimid Egypt. The Templars constructed a siege tower, which was burned down by the Egyptian soldiers inside Ascalon. The wind caught the flames and part of the walls of Ascalon burned down as well.

According to William of Tyre, knights of the Order rushed through the breach without Baldwin's knowledge while Bernard prevented other crusaders from following, as he did not want to share the spoils of the city with the king. Bernard and about forty of his Templars were killed by the larger Egyptian garrison. Their bodies were displayed on the ramparts and their heads were sent to the sultan. Other more modern accounts say that William of Tyre's version may have been distorted, since it may have been based on the defensive accounts given by the army's commanders as to why they did not follow the Templars into the breach.

In yet another differing account by a Damascene chronicler in the city, the breach of the wall is mentioned as a precursor to the fall of the city; he makes no mention of the incident with the Templars. Regardless of which account is believed, Bernard was killed and beheaded during the fighting. A few days later, Baldwin captured the fortress; shortly thereafter, the Templars elected André de Montbard as their Grand Master.

== Sources ==
- Barber, Malcolm (1994). The New Knighthood. Cambridge: Cambridge University Press. ISBN 978-1-107-60473-5.

Religious titles
| Preceded by Everard des Barres | Grand Master of the Knights Templar; 1151–1153 | Succeeded by André de Montbard |
