= Bernart de Rovenac =

French troubadour and poet

Bernart de Rovenac, Rovenhac, or Roenach (fl. 1242–1261) was a Languedocian troubadour. Four of his sirventes have been preserved. The attitude ubiquitous in his poetry is perhaps best expressed by these lines: Aital guerra m'agrada mas que platz, / non tals treguas ont om si'enganatz ("Thus war would please me more than peace, / nor such truces wherein men lie").

Bernart hailed from Rovenac in the modern Aude. He is first attested in early 1242, when he composed a poem, Ja no vuelh do mi esnenda, concerning a local uprising against King Louis IX in Languedoc. In it he attacks both James I of Aragon and Henry III of England for not coming to the aid of their vassals and makes a play on James' Occitan name, Jacme: Jacme (i.e. jac-me) quar trop vol jazer, meaning that it is appropriate his name is "James (i.e. "Going-to-bed"), because he wants to lie down too much." This piece was written in Limós near Rovenac, as a line of the tornada indicates.

In a slightly later poem, D'un sirventes m'es gran voluntatz preza, Bernart attacks amdos los reis ("both the kings") for neglecting lor fieus ("their fiefs") that the rei que conquer Suria ("king who conquered Syria") has possessed. The two kings are James and Henry and "the king who conquered Syria" is a mocking reference to Louis, whose Seventh Crusade ended in defeat and capture at the Battle of Mansurah (1250). Louis was still captive in Syria (1254) when Bernart wrote in hopes that the two kings would take advantage of the French monarch's absence.

Because of his political poetry, Bernart was very unpopular with the Aragonese court, though he may have travelled into Castile and certainly had a high opinion of Alfonso X of Castile. In 1259–60 he joined the revolt led by Ramon Folc V de Cardona against James of Aragon, which occasion a meg-sirventes (half-sirventes) no longer extant but mentioned in the poem Can aug en cort critz e mazans e brutz by Cerverí de Girona (towards the end of 1259). Bernart's response to Cerverí's criticism that he was nought but a jongleur, if he made one, has not survived. Cerverí, like Bernart, was patronised by Ramon Folc, but unlike Bernart he became a court poet to the Aragonese kings. Professional jealousy may have been involved in his spat with En Roenach, for he certainly remained on good terms with Ramon Folc.

The only piece of Bernart's work that cannot be dated with precision is Una sirventesca, written sometimes between 1241 and 1253. It is a sirventes joglaresc, that is, a sirventes making fun of a jongleur, in this case named Rainier. The metre is highly artificial and the last two lines of each cobla are a refranh (refrain). Cerverí copied it in his Ta mal ne fay sala, the second aniversari for Ramon Folc V (died 1276). Bernart was both an influence on and a competitor with Cerverí, whose career began at the time Bernart's ended.

Bernart's last sirventes was occasioned by the execution of Guillem Ramon II d'Òdena in 1261. Guillem's testament, in which he confesses his guilt and crimes, is dated to 14 January and his execution must have taken place shortly after that date. He was convicted of breaking the truce signed between the Crown and the barons and drowned at sea between Sitges and Cubelles by the infante Peter. Bernart wrote an attack on Peter, whom he compares to executioner who masks his face, in Belh m'es quan vei pels vergiers e pels pratz. It was composed in the same metre as Cerverí's Can aug. Scholars have dated it to 1224 and 1274–5, but its context leaves it beyond doubt that it was composed in 1261.

== Sources ==
- Riquer, Martín de. Los trovadores: historia literaria y textos. 3 vol. Barcelona: Planeta, 1975.
- Snow, Joseph T. "The Iberian Peninsula." A Handbook of the Troubadours edd. F. R. P. Akehurst and Judith M. Davis. Berkeley: University of California Press, 1995. ISBN 0-520-07976-0.
