= Richard de Bures =

- Coat of arms of Richard de Bures

17th Grand Master of the Knights Templar
- In office 1245–1247
- Preceded by: Armand de Périgord
- Succeeded by: Guillaume de Sonnac

Personal details
- Born: Unknown
- Died: May 1247

Richard de Bures (? – May 1247) may have been seventeenth Grand Master of the Knights Templar, from 1245 to 1247, although many sources make no mention of him. It is possible he simply acted as a Master during Périgord's captivity.

Religious titles
Preceded by Armand de Lavoie	Grand Master of the Knights Templar; 1245–1247	Succeeded by Guillaume de Sonnac
