= Thomas Bérard =

20th Grand Master of the Knights Templar

- Coat of arms of Thomas Bérard

20th Grand Master of the Knights Templar
- In office 1256–1273
- Preceded by: Renaud de Vichiers
- Succeeded by: Guillaume de Beaujeu

Personal details
- Born: Unknown
- Died: 25 March 1273

Thomas Bérard (also Béraud or Bérault), (? – 25 March 1273) was the 20th Grand Master of the Knights Templar, from 1256 to 1273.

He wrote several letters to the King Henry III of England describing the miserable situation in the Holy Land. He initiated cooperation with other two military orders since there had been much rivalry among them before. This was agreed upon by their Grand Masters: Hugues de Revel of Hospitaliers and Anno von Sangershausen of Teutonic Knights.

In 1266 the large Templar fortress of Safed was besieged by Egyptian Mameluks under Baibars, the new Sultan of Cairo, after a failed attempt to conquer Pilgrim's Castle. It appears that the fortress garrison was betrayed by a hired Syrian soldier. All Templars (and Hospitallers) were beheaded after they refused to convert to Islam. Other fortresses fell next, among them Beaufort, only recently acquired by the Templars. Also, the city of Antioch fell to Baibars and was never again held by Christian forces. The fall of Antioch left Templar fortresses in the Amanus Mountains easily accessible to attackers. Gaston, an immensely strong fortification on the road to Syria, was defended only by a small Templar garrison. Nevertheless, they decided to hold the fortress, but were betrayed by one of the brothers. Meanwhile, the Grand Master Thomas Bérard sent a messenger carrying an order to retreat to La Roche Guillaume. In February 1271, he ordered the surrender of Chastel Blanc with permission to retreat to Tortosa. In June, Montfort, the last inland fortification of Christians in the Holy Land, was yielded.

Bérard sent messages to the pope asking for help, and the pope responded by calling for an Eighth Crusade, which never arrived. After the loss of Crac des Chevaliers by the Hospitallers in 1271 a ten-year truce was agreed between the Christians and the Muslims.

According to "The Chronicle of the Templar of Tyre", Bérard died on 25 March 1273.

Preceded by Renaud de Vichiers	Grand Master of the Knights Templar; 1256–1273	Succeeded by Guillaume de Beaujeu
