= Everard des Barres =

Third Grand Master of the Knights Templa

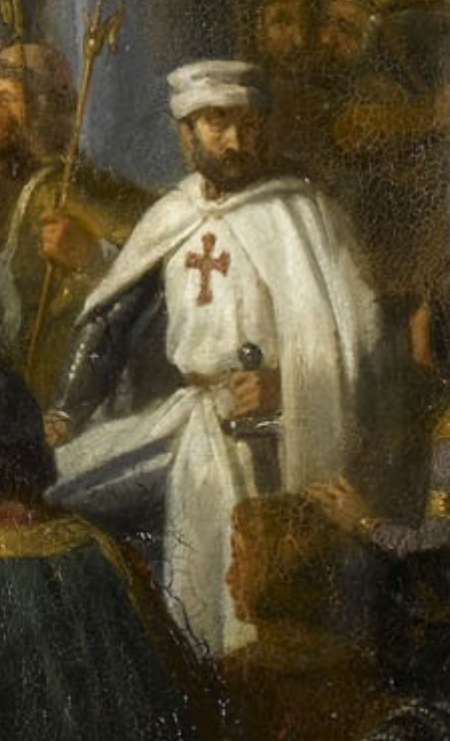
- Everard des Barres, during the assembly of the crusaders at Ptolemais in 1148. 1839 depiction by Charles-Alexandre Debacq

3rd Grand Master of the Knights Templar
- In office 1147–1152
- Preceded by: Robert de Craon
- Succeeded by: Bernard de Tremelay

Personal details
- Born: Unknown
- Died: after 1176

Military service
- Allegiance: Knights Templar
- Battles/wars: Second Crusade; Siege of Damascus

Everard des Barres (also Eberhard von Barres or Eberhard De Bären) (died after 1176) was the third Grand Master of the Knights Templar from 1147 to 1152.

Everard was Master of the Templars in France and accompanied Louis VII of France on the Second Crusade. In 1147, he was one of the three ambassadors that negotiated the passage of the Crusader army through the Byzantine Empire with Emperor Manuel I Komnenos. Upon the death of Robert de Craon in 1149, he was elected Grand Master of the Templar Order. His election was clearly influenced by the connection he had with Louis VII, since the Order needed to exploit those contacts and resources within France to maintain its military presence in the Holy Land. Everard later saved Louis during a battle with the Seljuk Turks in Pisidia.

According to the chronicler Odo of Deuil, Everard was extremely pious and valiant. He seems to have had a strong influence on Louis. During the crusade, in May 1148, Louis asked for his assistance securing a loan from the Templars to continue funding the French campaign. After the failure of the crusade at the Siege of Damascus in 1148, Louis returned to France, followed by Everard, who was in charge of the king's treasury. Everard's Templars stayed behind and helped defend Jerusalem against a Turkish raid in 1149.

Back in France, Everard resigned in 1152 and became a monk at Clairvaux alongside Bernard of Clairvaux. He was succeeded by Bernard de Tremelay. He died some time after 1176.

== Bibliography ==
- Barber, Malcolm; Bate, Keith, eds. (2002). The Templars: Selected Sources. Manchester University Press.4
- Barber, Malcolm (2012). The New Knighthood: A History of the Order of the Temple. Cambridge University Press.
- Demurger, Alain (2008). Les Templiers, une chevalerie chrétienne au Moyen Âge (in French). Paris: Éditions du Seuil. ISBN 978-2-7578-1122-1.
- Jotischky, Andrew (2013). Crusading and the Crusader States. Routledge.
- Newman, Sharan (2007). The Real History Behind the Templars. Berkley Books.

Religious titles
| Preceded by Robert de Craon | Grand Master of the Knights Templar; 1147–1152 | Succeeded by Bernard de Tremelay |
