= 1248 in France =

- Decades: 1220s; 1230s; 1240s; 1250s; 1260s
- See also: History of France; Timeline of French history; List of years in France

1248 in France included the following events in French history:

== Seventh Crusade ==
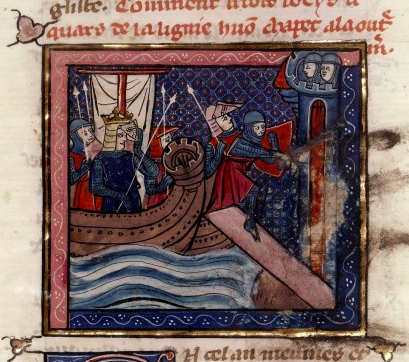
A picture of the Seventh Crusade

The Seventh Crusade, which was a part of the crusades, started in 1248 and continued until 1254 CE. It was an army led by the French king Louis IX. The military arrangement set out to conquer Egypt and take over Jerusalem. Even though there were some victories, in the end, the crusade was unsuccessful.

== Sainte-Chapelle ==
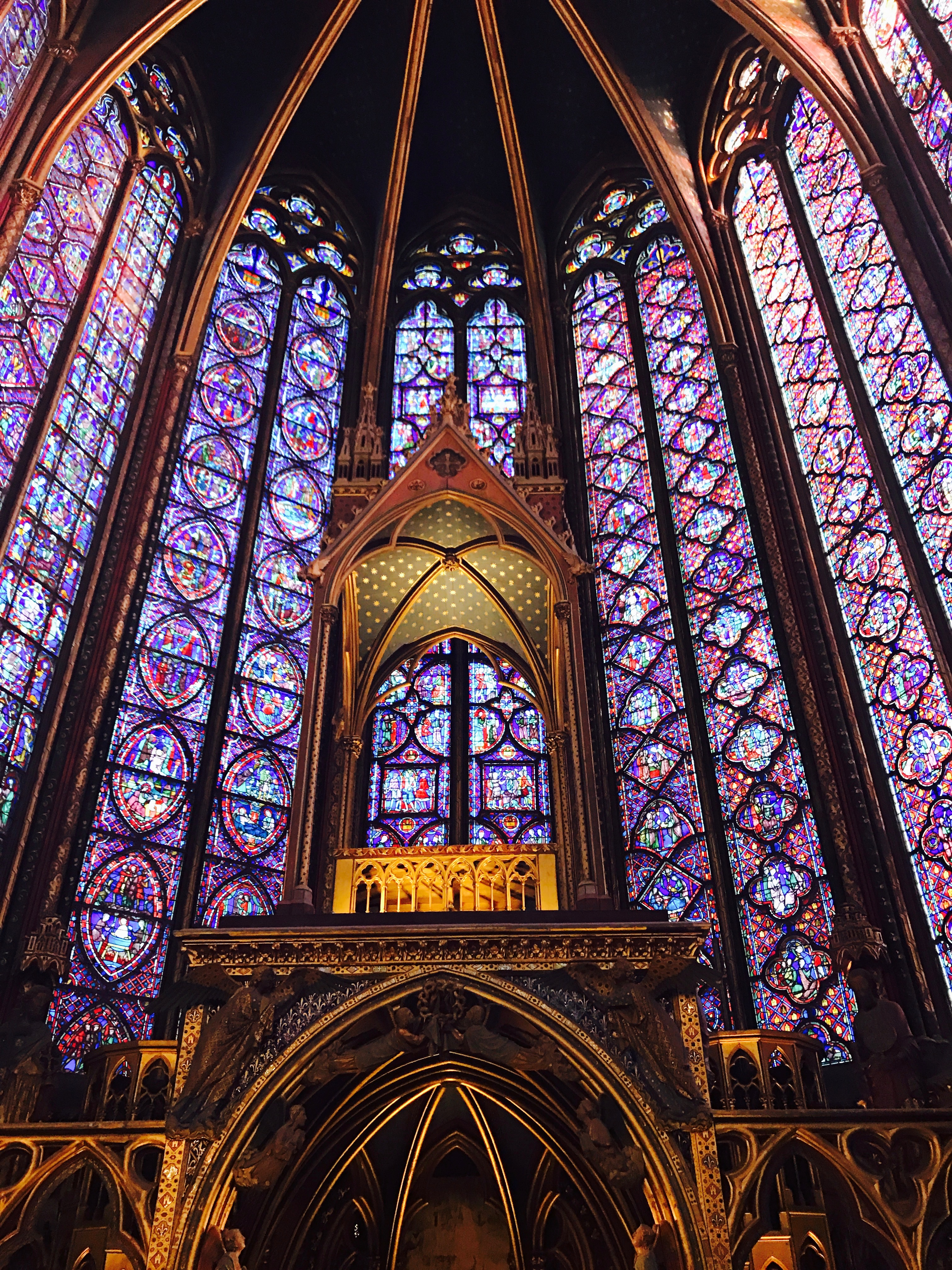
The Sainte-Chapelle

The Sainte-Chapelle is a royal chapel in Île de la Cité, Paris. It was completed in 1248. The lower area was for the workers of the palace, while the upper area was for King Louis IX's most valuable relics. During, the French Revolution all the rood screen, furniture, stalls, reliquaries, boxes, and all the regalia being stored in the Chapelle were destroyed. The only relic that survived was the Crown of Thorns.

== Births ==
- Otto IV, Count of Burgundy (born 1248)
- Robert II, Duke of Burgundy (born 1248)
- Blanche of Artois (born 1248)

== See also ==
- Kingdom of France
- Crusader states
- Kingdom of Jerusalem
- Jean de Joinville – an account of the life of Louis IX and the logistics of the Seventh Crusade
- French Gothic architecture
- List of historic churches in Paris
- List of tourist attractions in Paris
