= List of grand masters of the Knights Templar =

The grand master of the Knights Templar was the supreme commander of the holy order, starting with founder Hugues de Payens. Some held the office for life while others resigned the office to pass the rest of their life in monasteries or diplomacy. Grand masters often led their knights into battle on the front line and the numerous occupational hazards of battle made some tenures very short. Out of 23 grand masters at least four were killed in action.

Each country had its own master, and the masters reported to the grand master. He oversaw all of the operations of the order, including both the military operations in the Holy Land and Eastern Europe, and the financial and business dealings in the order's infrastructure of Western Europe. The grand master controlled the actions of the order but he was expected to act the same way as the rest of the knights. After Pope Innocent II issued the bull Omne datum optimum on behalf of the Templars in 1139, the grand master was obliged to answer only to him.

== List of grand masters ==
No.	Arms	Name	Time in office	Seat
1		Hugues de Payens	c. 1119–1136	Jerusalem (Kingdom of Jerusalem)
2		Robert de Craon	1136–1147	Jerusalem (Kingdom of Jerusalem)
3		Everard des Barres	1147–1151	Jerusalem (Kingdom of Jerusalem)
4		Bernard de Tremelay (KIA) (Note: Bernard de Tremelay was killed at the Siege of Ascalon.)	1151–1153	Jerusalem (Kingdom of Jerusalem)
5		André de Montbard	1153–1156	Jerusalem (Kingdom of Jerusalem)
6		Bertrand de Blanchefort	1156–1169	Jerusalem (Kingdom of Jerusalem)
7		Philip of Milly	1169–1171	Jerusalem (Kingdom of Jerusalem)
8		Odo of St Amand (POW) (Note: Odo of St Amand was captured at the Battle of Marj Ayyun.)	1171–1179	Jerusalem (Kingdom of Jerusalem)
9		Arnold of Torroja	1181–1184	Jerusalem (Kingdom of Jerusalem)
10		Gerard of Ridefort (KIA) (Note: Gerard of Ridefort was killed at the Siege of Acre.)	1185–1189	Acre (Kingdom of Jerusalem)
11		Robert of Sablé	1191–1193	Acre (Kingdom of Jerusalem)
12		Gilbert Horal	1193–1200	Acre (Kingdom of Jerusalem)
13		Philippe du Plessis	1201–1208	Acre (Kingdom of Jerusalem)
14		William of Chartres	1209–1218	Acre (Kingdom of Jerusalem)
15		Peire de Montagut	1218–1232	Acre (Kingdom of Jerusalem)
16		Armand de Périgord (KIA/POW) (Note: Armand de Périgord was either killed or captured at the Battle of La Forbie; authorities differ. Richard de Bures commanded the Templars until the election of Guillame de Sonnac; whether he was Grand Master is disputed.)	1232–1244	Acre (Kingdom of Jerusalem)
17		Richard de Bures	1245–1247	Acre (Kingdom of Jerusalem)
18		Guillaume de Sonnac (KIA) (Note: Guillaume de Sonnac was killed at the Battle of Fariskur.)	1247–1250	Acre (Kingdom of Jerusalem)
19		Renaud de Vichiers	1250–1256	Acre (Kingdom of Jerusalem)
20		Thomas Bérard	1256–1273	Acre (Kingdom of Jerusalem)
21		Guillaume de Beaujeu (KIA) (Note: Guillaume de Beaujeu was killed at the Siege of Acre.)	1273–1291	Acre (Kingdom of Jerusalem)
22		Thibaud Gaudin	1291–1292	Cyprus (Kingdom of Cyprus)
23		Jacques de Molay	1292–1312	Cyprus (Kingdom of Cyprus)

== See also ==
- Seal of the grand master of the Knights Templar
- List of Knights Templar
- List of grand masters of the Knights Hospitaller
- Grand Masters and Lieutenancies of the Order of the Holy Sepulchre
- Grand Master of the Teutonic Order
- Grand Master of the Order of Saint Lazarus

== Bibliography ==
- Burman, Edward (1990). The Templars: Knights of God. Rochester: Destiny Books. ISBN 978-0-89281-221-9.
