= André de Longjumeau =

13th-century French friar and diplomat

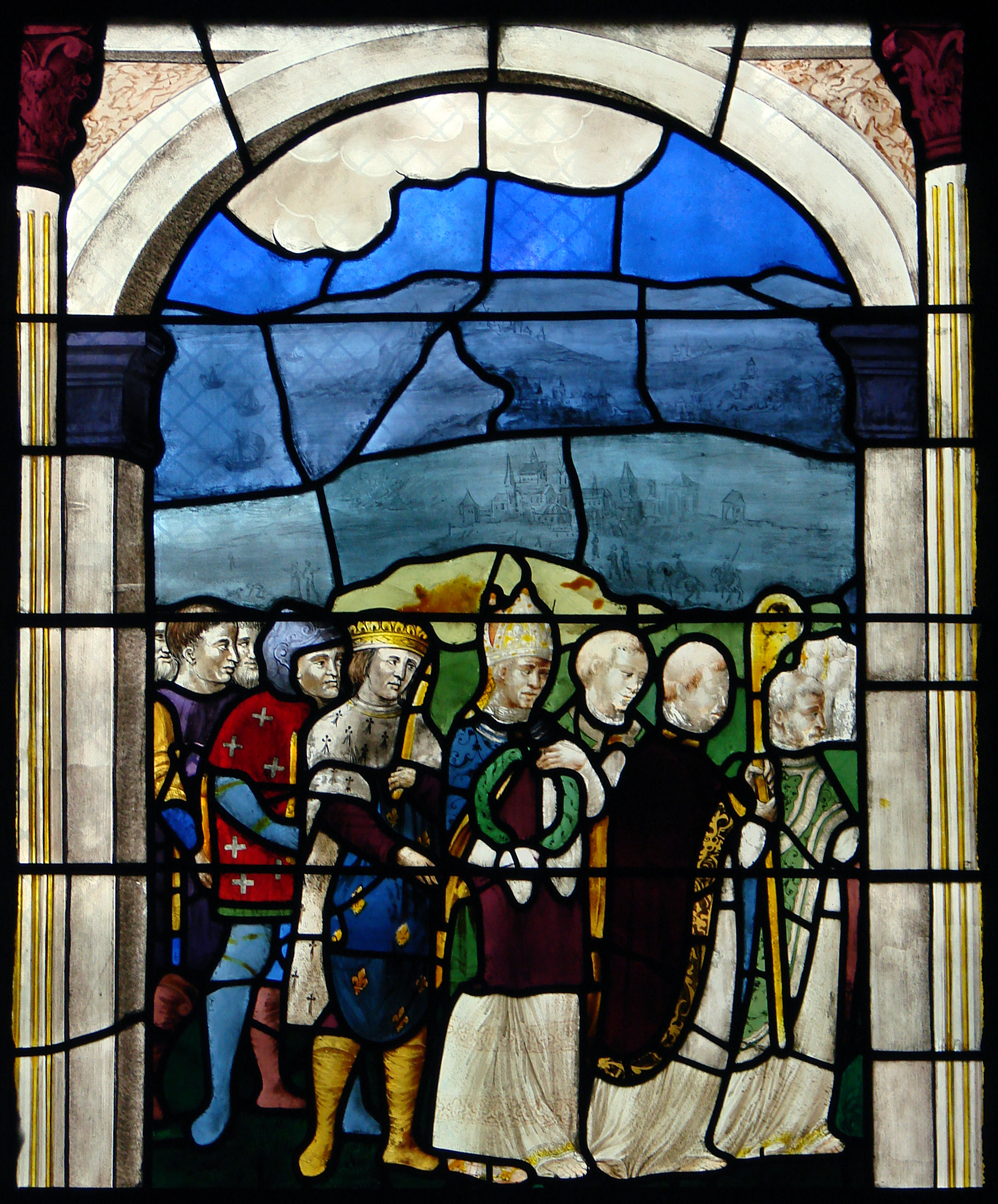
Procession with Saint Louis and a bishop carrying the Crown of thorns. Stained glass window from Moulins Cathedral.

André de Longjumeau (also known as Andrew of Longjumeau in English) was a French diplomat and Dominican missionary and one of the most active Occidental diplomats in the East in the 13th century. He led two embassies to the Mongols: the first carried letters from Pope Innocent IV and the second bore gifts and letters from Louis IX of France to Güyük Khan. Well acquainted with the Middle East, he spoke Arabic and "Chaldean" (thought to be either Syriac or Persian).

== Mission for the holy Crown of Thorns ==
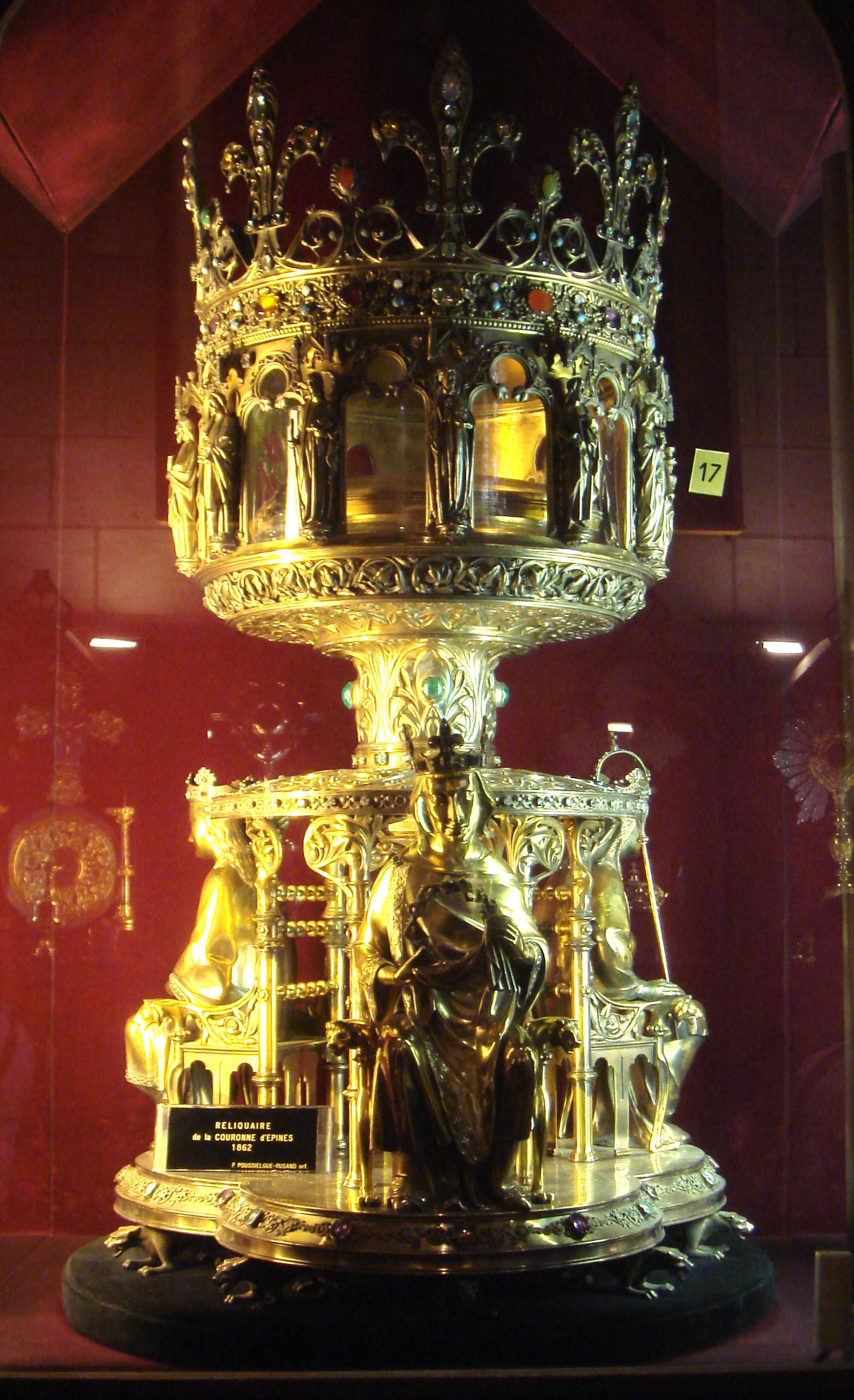
André went to Constantinople to obtain the crown of thorns bought by Louis IX from Baldwin II, Latin Emperor. It is preserved today in a 19th-century reliquary, in Notre-Dame de Paris.

André's first mission to the East was when he was asked by the French king Louis IX to go to Constantinople to obtain the crown of thorns that had been sold to him by the Latin emperor Baldwin II in 1238, who was anxious to obtain support for his empire. André was accompanied on this mission by a Dominican friar, brother Jacques.

== Papal mission to the Mongols (1245–1247) ==
André of Longjumeau led one of four missions dispatched to the Mongols by Pope Innocent IV. He left Lyon in the spring of 1245 for the Levant. He visited Muslim principalities in Syria and representatives of the Church of the East and Syriac Orthodox Church in Seljuk Persia, finally delivering the papal correspondence to a Mongol general near Tabriz. In Tabriz, André de Longjumeau met with a monk from the Far East named Simeon Rabban Ata, who had been put in charge by the Khan of protecting Christians in the Middle East.

== Second mission to the Mongols (1249–1251) ==
At the Mongol camp near Kars, André had met a certain David, who in December 1248 appeared at the court of King Louis IX of France, who was preparing his armies in the allied Kingdom of Cyprus. André, who was now with the French King, interpreted David's words as a real or pretended offer of alliance from the Mongol general Eljigidei, and a proposal of a joint attack on Ayyubid Syria. In reply to this, the French sovereign dispatched André as his ambassador to Güyük Khan. Longjumeau went with his brother Jacques (also a Dominican) and several others – John Goderiche, John of Carcassonne, Herbert "Le Sommelier", Gerbert of Sens, Robert (a clerk), a certain William, and an unnamed clerk of Poissy.

The party set out on 16 February 1249, with letters from King Louis and the papal legate, and lavish presents, including a chapel tent lined with scarlet cloth and embroidered with sacred pictures. From Cyprus they went to the port of Antioch in Syria, and thence traveled for a year to the Khan's court, going ten leagues (55.56 kilometers) per day. Their route led them through Persia, along the southern and eastern shores of the Caspian Sea, and certainly through Taraz, north-east of Tashkent.

Upon arrival at the supreme Mongol court – either that on the Emil River (near Lake Alakol and the present Russo-Chinese frontier in the Altai Mountains), or more probably at or near Karakorum itself, southwest of Lake Baikal – André found Güyük Khan dead, poisoned, as the envoy supposed, by Batu Khan's agents. The regent Oghul Qaimish, Güyük Khan's widow (the "Camus" of William of Rubruck), seems to have received him with presents and a dismissive letter for Louis IX. It is certain that before the friar had left "Tartary", Möngke, Güyük's successor, had been elected khagan.

André's report to his sovereign, whom he rejoined in 1251 at Caesarea Palaestina, appears to have been a mixture of history and fable; the latter affects his narrative of the Mongols' rise to greatness, and the struggles of their leader Genghis Khan with the mythical Prester John, and in the supposed location of the Mongols' homeland, close to the prison of Gog and Magog. On the other hand, the envoy's account of Mongol customs is fairly accurate, and his statements about Mongol Christianity and its prosperity, though perhaps exaggerated (e.g. as to the 800 chapels on wheels in the nomadic host) are likely factual.

Mounds of bones marked his road, witnesses of devastations that other historians record in detail. He found Christian prisoners from Germany in the heart of "Tartary" at Taraz and was compelled to observe the ceremony of passing between two fires, as a bringer of gifts to a dead Genghis Khan, gifts which were treated by the Mongols as evidence of submission. This insulting behavior, and the language of the letter with which André reappeared, marked the mission a failure: King Louis, says Jean de Joinville, "se repenti fort" ("felt very sorry").

== Death ==
The date and location of André's death is unknown.

We only know of André through references in other writers: see especially William of Rubruck's in Recueil de voyages, iv. (Paris, 1839), pp. 261, 265, 279, 296, 310, 353, 363, 370; Joinville, ed. Francisque Michel (1858, etc.), pp. 142, etc.; Jean Pierre Sarrasin, in same vol., pp. 254–235; William of Nangis in Recueil des historiens des Gaules, xx. 359–367; Rémusat, Mémoires sur les relations politiques des princes chrétiens… avec les… Mongols (1822, etc.), p. 52.

== See also ==
- Giovanni da Pian del Carpine
- Lawrence of Portugal
- Ascelin of Lombardy
- Simon of Saint-Quentin
- Chronology of European exploration of Asia
- Franco-Mongol alliance
