= Siege of Damietta (1249) =

Part of the Seventh Crusade

Coordinates: 31.4167°N 31.8167°E

- Part of Seventh Crusade
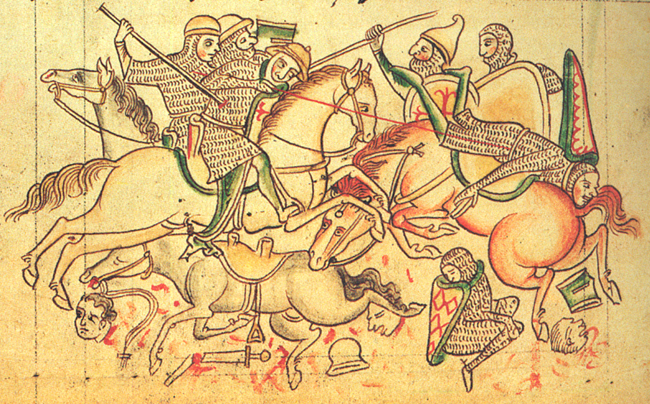
- Miniature from the Chronica Majora by Matthew Paris (c. 1255)
Date	6 June 1249
Location	Damietta, Ayyubid Sultanate
Result	Crusader victory

Belligerents
Kingdom of France; Knights Templar; Knights Hospitaller	Ayyubid Sultanate

Commanders and leaders
Louis IX of France; Guillaume de Sonnac; Jean de Ronay	Emir Fahreddin

Strength
15,000 (including 3,000 knights); 36 ships	Unknown

Casualties and losses
Unknown	Unknown; 24 trebuchets captured

The siege of Damietta occurred in 1249 and was part of the Seventh Crusade.

Louis IX of France landed at Damietta in 1249. Egypt would, Louis thought, provide a base from which to attack Jerusalem, and its wealth and supply of grain would keep the crusaders fed and equipped.

On 6 June Damietta was taken with little resistance from the Egyptians, who withdrew further up the Nile. Louis was able to build a stockade for the whole crusade camp with the wood from 24 captured Egyptian trebuchets. The flooding of the Nile had not been taken into account, however, and it soon grounded Louis and his army at Damietta for six months, where the knights sat back and enjoyed the spoils of war. Louis ignored the agreement made during the Fifth Crusade that Damietta should be given to the Kingdom of Jerusalem, now a rump state in Acre, but he did set up an archbishop there (Gilles of Saumur, under the authority of the Latin Patriarch of Jerusalem, Robert of Nantes) and used the city as a base to direct military operations against the Muslims of Syria.
