= David and Mark =

David and Marc were two Eastern Christians who were sent as ambassadors to the French king Louis IX by the Mongols in 1248. David is also known by his Arab name Saif al-Din Muzaffar Dawaud. David and Marc were first met by André de Longjumeau in 1245 in Tabriz, during his mission to the Mongol realm.

== Embassy to King Louis ==
Little is known about the envoys except for their mission. In 1248, the two men were sent by the Mongol general Eljigidei, acting on behalf of the Khan Güyük, to meet with Louis IX on Cyprus. King Louis had arrived on the island on 17 November 1248, making preparation for his Crusade. The two envoys met with him on 20 December. The speed of their arrival is perhaps because they had been informed of Louis’ journey beforehand, as he had left from Aigues-Mortes on 25 August 1248. They claimed they had received the information from the sultan of Mossoul. The envoys also met with the Papal legate Eudes de Chateauroux.

The two envoys brought with them a missive to Louis from Khan Güyük. This letter contrasted with earlier Mongol letters, which had been filled with contempt and demands for submission. However, Güyük's letter called Louis "the great king" ("maximus rex"), and wished him the best for his battles against the Muslims. Güyük also asked Louis to respect all the Christian faiths present in the Orient:

”The king of the world demands (...) that there should not be, by the grace of God, any segregation between the Latins, the Greeks, the Armenians, the Nestorians, the Jacobites, and all those who honour the cross; all of them are one and the same to our eyes. Therefore we also ask to the magnificent king that he make no difference between them as well.”

— Letter from Güyük to King Louis, 1248.

David and Marc claimed that Güyük had been converted to Christianity with 18 other princes by "Bishop Malassias" and that Eljigedei had already been Christian for a long time.

After celebrating Christmas together, David and Marc had a final interview with the king on 25 January 1249. They left on the 26th, together with the seven French envoys led by King Louis' envoy, André de Longjumeau. The group included two other Dominican friars, Jean de Carcassonne and Andre’s brother Guillaume de Longjumeau; two clerks Jehanz Godriche and Robert de Poissy; and two officers Gilbert de Sens and Herberz le Sommelierz. A more or less independent clerk named Theodule d’Acre would also join the group, and later visit Karakorum. They carried rich presents from the king of France to the Mongol ruler: a scarlet tent-chapel with an embroidered scene of the life of Christ, and precious parcels of the cross of Jesus Christ.

From Antioch or Saint-Jean d'Acre to Central Asia, the group is known to have travelled under a Mongol guard using the "admirably organized" Mongol imperial post.

== See also ==
- Christianity among the Mongols
