= Renaud de Vichiers =

Christian crusader

- Coat of arms of Renaud de Vichiers

19th Grand Master of the Knights Templar
- In office 1250–1256
- Preceded by: Guillaume de Sonnac
- Succeeded by: Thomas Bérard

Personal details
- Born: Unknown
- Died: 20 January 1256

Seal of Regnaud de Vichy

Renaud (Reginald) de Vichiers (? – 20 January 1256) was the 19th Grand Master of the Knights Templar from 1250 to 1256.

He joined the Knights Templar and was appointed Preceptor of Saint-Jean-d'Acre in 1240 and Master of France from 1242 to 1249.

He was a supporter and comrade-in-arms of Louis IX of France, who helped him be elected Grand Master in place of Guillaume de Sonnac, killed in Egypt at the Battle of Al Mansurah, February 11, 1250. He shortly quarreled with Louis, though, over a diplomatic mission of Hugues de Jouy, the Templar Marshal, to Damascus. In 1252, Hugues was banished from the Kingdom of Jerusalem.

In 1252, Renaud de Vichiers retired to a monastery where he stayed until his death on 20 January 1256.

== Notes ==
Preceded by Guillaume de Sonnac	Grand Master of the Knights Templar; 1250–1256	Succeeded by Thomas Bérard
