= Internet History Sourcebooks Project =

- Creators: Paul Halsall (editor); Jerome S. Arkenberg (contributing editor)
- Website: sourcebooks.fordham.edu
- Launched: 1996
- Current status: online

The Internet History Sourcebooks Project is located at the Fordham University History Department and Center for Medieval Studies. It is a web site with modern, medieval and ancient primary source documents, maps, secondary sources, bibliographies, images and music. Paul Halsall is the editor, with Jerome S. Arkenberg as the contributing editor. It was first created in 1996, and is used extensively by teachers as an alternative to textbooks.

== Internet Medieval Sourcebook ==
The Internet Medieval Sourcebook or IMS is a web site with Medieval source documents, maps, secondary sources, bibliographies, images and music. It is located at the Fordham University Center for Medieval Studies.

A large number of the documents on IMS are older copyright-expired translations from the 19th and early 20th century. However, IMS also has a section of "recently translated texts" which have been translated just for IMS. In fact, IMS claims it "contains more newly-translated texts than any available published collection of medieval sources."

== Internet Ancient Sourcebook ==
The Internet Ancient History Sourcebook is one of the three main sourcebooks of the Internet History Sourcebooks Project (IHSP), alongside the Medieval and Modern sourcebooks. Created in 1996 by Paul Halsall and hosted by Fordham University, it is a collection of public-domain and copy-permitted primary texts for the study of ancient history, organised into chronological, regional and thematic sections such as "Human Origins", "Mesopotamia", "Egypt", "Greece", "Rome", "Late Antiquity", "Christian Origins" and "Legal Texts".A review published by the Roy Rosenzweig Center for History and New Media at George Mason University described the site as containing more than a thousand files, over half of them drawn from Greek and Roman authors and about a quarter from Mesopotamian and Egyptian sources, with Persian, Hebrew, Indian, Chinese and Japanese material also represented. Because Halsall relied heavily on public-domain material, most translations are at least 75 years old; the review judged them serviceable for classroom use but noted that newer translations carry updated introductions and scholarly notes, and that some long single-file texts are harder to navigate than the topical extracts. The site also includes a "Studying Ancient History" section on primary-source criticism and historiography, and permits copying for individual and classroom use but not commercial distribution.

== Internet Modern Sourcebook ==
The Internet Modern History Sourcebook is intended to serve the needs of teachers and students in college survey courses in modern European history and American history, as well as in modern Western Civilization and World Cultures.

== Other Sourcebooks ==
In addition to the large collections in the Medieval, Ancient, and Modern Sourcebooks, the Internet History Sourcebooks Project also includes Sourcebooks on African, East Asian, Global, Indian, Islamic, Jewish, Lesbian and Gay, Science, and Women's History.
