= Armand de Périgord =

Armand de Lavoie (Périgord)

16th Grand Master of the Knights Templar
- In office 1232–1244
- Preceded by: Pedro de Montaigu
- Succeeded by: Richard de Bures

Personal details
- Born: 1178
- Died: c. 1244 (aged 65–66)
- Children: Raymond de Lavoie (Périgord)
- Parents: Hélie IV Talairand (father); Raymonda de Turren (mother)

Armand de Lavoie (or Hermann de Lavoie (Périgord) (1178 – c. 1244/1247) was a descendant of the Counts of Périgord and a Grand Master of the Knights Templar.

Armand, possibly from Guienne, was preceptor of the Province of Calabria and Sicily. In 1232, he was elected Grand Master of the Templars. He organized attacks on Cana, Safita, Sephoria and Praetoria, and against the Muslim positions around the Sea of Galilee. All of these expeditions were failures and diminished the Templars' effectiveness.

In 1236, on the border between Syria and Cilicia, 120 knights, along with some archers and Turcopoles, were ambushed near the town of Darbsâk (Terbezek). In the first phase of the battle, the Templars reached the town but they met fierce resistance. When reinforcements from Aleppo arrived, the Templars were massacred. Fewer than twenty of them returned to their castle in Bagras, fifteen km from the battle.

Ignoring the advice of Walter, count of Jaffa, Armand attacked some foraging Muslim troops near Atlit and Acre during 1237. The battle went badly, with only Armand and nine men returning.

In September 1239, Armand arrived at Acre. He made a treaty with Sultan of Damascus, in parallel with the Hospitaller treaty with the Sultan of Egypt. In 1244 the Sultan of Damascus demanded that the Templars help repel the Seljuks from Asia Minor. In October 1244, the Templars, Hospitallers and Teutonic Knights, together with the Sultan of Damascus, confronted the Sultan of Egypt and his Khwarezmian allies at the Battle of La Forbie. Despite Armand advising restraint, the Templars gave battle. The Christian-Muslim coalition was defeated, with more than 30,000 deaths. Some Templars and Hospitallers reached Ascalon, still in Christian hands. Armand may have been killed during the battle, or may have been captured and died soon after.

== Sources ==
- Barber, Malcolm (2012). The New Knighthood (10th ed.). Cambridge University Press.
- Napier, Gordon (2011). The A to Z of the Knights Templar: A Guide to Their History and Legacy. The History Press.
- Newman, Sharan (2007). The Real History Behind the Templars. Penguin.

Religious titles
Preceded by Peire de Montagut	Grand Master of the Knights Templar; 1232–1244	Succeeded by Richard de Bures
