= List of Knights Templar =

This is a list of some members of the Knights Templar, a powerful Christian military order during the time of the Crusades. At peak, the Order had approximately 20,000 members.

The Knights Templar were led by the Grand Master, originally based in Jerusalem, whose deputy was the Seneschal. Next in importance was the Marshal, who was responsible for individual commanders, horses, arms and equipment. He usually carried the standard or nominated a standard-bearer. The Commander of the Kingdom of Jerusalem was the treasurer and shared some authority with the Grand Master, balancing his power. Other cities also had Commanders with specific regional responsibilities.

The Grand Master and his Seneschal ruled over eight Templar provincial Masters in Europe, who were responsible for Apulia, Aragon, England, France, Hungary, Poitiers, Portugal and Scotland.

The bulk of the fighting force was made up of knights and sergeants. Knights, who usually came from the nobility, were the most prestigious and wore the white mantle and red cross over their armour, carried knightly weapons, rode horses and had the services of a squire. Sergeants filled other roles such as blacksmith or mason as well as fighting in battle. There were also squires who performed the task of caring for the horses.

== Early members ==
- Hugues de Payens (founder, 1118) (first Grand Master, 1118–1136)
- Godfrey de Saint-Omer (founding member, 1118)
- Payen de Montdidier (founding member, 1118)
- Archambaud de Saint Amand (or Saint Aignan) (founding member, 1118)
- André de Montbard (founding member, 1118) (later Grand Master, 1153–1156)
- Gundemar (founding member, 1118), Cistercian Priest and Templar, relative of Bernard of Clairvaux (see Gondomar in portuguese Wiki).
- Rossal/Roral (founding member, 1118), Cistercian Priest and Templar, relative of Bernard of Clairvaux
- Geoffroy Bisol (founding member, 1118)
- Godefroid (founding member, 1118)
- Hugues de Champagne (1125)
- Fulk V, Count of Anjou, occurs 1119, 1120 or 1121.

== Aragon ==
=== Masters of Aragon ===
All the dates given are those of the first record as master and of the last. Rarely is the date of appointment or end of tenure known.

The following were de facto provincial masters before the formal creation of an Aragonese province:

- Hugh of Rigaud (1128–1136)
- Raymond Gaucebert (1134)
- Arnold of Bedocio (1136)

The following were "masters in Provence and certain parts of Spain":

- Pere de Rovira (Pere de la Rovira; November 1143 – January 1158) First Brother to hold the title of Provincial Master
- Hugh of Barcelona (1159 – April 1162)
- Hugh Geoffrey (Hugues Godefroi; May 1163 – 1166)
- Arnold of Torroja (Arnaud de Toroge; October 1166 – March 1181) (afterwards Grand Master 1181–1184)
- Berenguer of Avinyó (Bérenger d'Avignon; April 1181 – March 1183)
- Guy of Sellón (April–June 1183)
- Lorencio Plaza; November 1184)
- Raymond of Canet (November 1183 – July 1185)
- Gilbert Eral (Gilbert Erail; October 1185 – August 1189) (afterwards Grand Master 1193–1200)
- Pons (of) Rigaud (September 1189 – February 1195)
- Gerald of Caercino (February 1196)
- Arnold of Claramunt (Arnaud de Clairmont; April – November 1196)
- Pons Marescalci (Dec. 1196 – June 1199)
- Arnold of Claramunt (August 1199 – April 1200), second time
- Raymond of Gurb (Raimon de Gurp; April 1200 – Nov. 1201)
- Pons (of) Rigaud (April 1202 – July 1206), second time
- Pedro de Monteagudo (Pierre de Montaigu; July 1207 – June 1212) (later Grand Master, 1218–1232)
- William Cadell (October 1212 – May 1213)
- William of Montrodón (January 1214 – September 1218)
- Evelio Ramirez born October 8 death Friday, October 13, 1307, lieutenant, cousin of James 11.
  - Adémar de Claret (1216–1218), lieutenant
  - Pons Menescal (1218–1221), lieutenant
- William of Azylach (Guillem d'Alliac; February 1221 – July 1223)
- Riperto of Puig Guigone (January 1224)
- Fulk of Montpesat (Fulcon de Montpezat; 1224 – Dec. 1227)
- William Cadell (March 1229 – June 1232), second time
- Raymond Patot (Raimon Patot; May 1233 – April 1234)
- Hugh of Montlaur (May 1234 – April 1238)
- Stephen of Belmonte (June – November 1239)

The following were "masters in Aragon", which also included Catalonia, Roussillon, Navarre, and eventually Majorca, Valencia, and Murcia:

- Raymond of Serra (May 1240 – June 1243)
- William of Cardona (January 1244 – May 1252)
- Hugh of Jouy (September 1254 – June 1247 / March 1258)
- William of Montañana (May 1258 – February 1262)
- William of Pontóns (March 1262 – August 1266)
- Arnold of Castellnou (March 1267 – February 1278)
- Peter of Moncada (April 1279 – October 1282)
- Berenguer of San Justo (April 1283 – May 1290)
- Berenguer of Cardona (June 1291 – January 1307)
- Simon of Lenda (September 1307)

Note also Peter Peronet, commander of Burriana in 1276.

== Czech lands ==
The Czech lands (or the Lands of the Bohemian Crown) now form the Czech Republic.

- Fridericus de Silvester (1286)
- Berthramus dictus de Czweck (1292), preceptor Niemiec, Sławii i Morawii, w 1294
- Bernhard von Eberstein (1291), w 1295

== England ==
=== Masters of England ===
- Fr. William Heath (1153–1156)
- Hugues d'Argentein (1150)
- Hoston de Saint-Omer (1153–1155)
- CoA
  Adam de Somervila (1153)
- Richard de Hastings (1155–1185)
- Geoffroy Fitzstephen (1185–1195)
- Robert de Neuham (1195–1200)
- Thomas Bérard (1200)
- Fr. Alain (1205)
- Guillaume Cadeil (1214)
- Lawrence Ryckman (1216)
- Sir Roger St. Leger (1217)
- Aimery de Sainte-Maure (1215–1219)
- Guillaume de la Gravelle (1220)
- Alain Martel (1220–1228)
- Fr. Aimery (1228)
- Robert de Montfort (1234)
- Robert de Sandford (1235–1241)
- Sir Richard de Argentein (1241–1246)
- Fr. Amblard (1250)
- Roncelin de Fos (1252–1259)
- Robert de Sandford (1259)
- Humbert de Pairaud (1270)
- Gui de Foresta (1275)
- Robert de Torteville (1276)
- Henri de Faverham (1277–1278)
- Robert de Torteville (1280)
- Gui de Foresta (1288)

+Robert de Haleghton (1290–1294 Yorkshire)

- Guillaume de Tourville (1292)
- Gui de Foresta (1293–1296)
- Brian le Jay (1296–1298)
- Guillaume de la More (1298–1307)
- Richard Stronge (1154–1189)

=== Others ===
- Robert of St. Albans (d. 1187), converted to Islam and married Saladin's niece, according to Roger of Howden
- Hugh de Paduinan
- Richard Mallebeench, Master of the Templars in England
- Gilbert of Ogerstan, caught stealing money from the Saladin tithe, 1188
- Sir Lachlan MacLean-de Corzon (d.1194) Baron of ak'ham, fought in the Third Crusade
- Sir William de Harcourt, 1216, fought at Siege of Damietta.
- Sir Robert de Sheffield, 1216, fought in the fifth crusade.
- Sir Robert Keyes, 1216, fought in the fifth crusade.
- Sir Allen William Howard of Norfolk (d.1239), fought in the Third Crusade
- Amberaldus, Master of the Templars in England
- Richord Brand, Conqueror of Tyre
- William de Ferrers, 3rd Earl of Derby, fought in the Third Crusade
- Gilbert de Lacy, Precentor of the Templars and a commander in the 1160s
- William Marshal, 1st Earl of Pembroke, invested as a knight on his deathbed
- Elyas de Rolleston, 1270, fought in the Eighth Crusade
- William de Goldingham d.1296 Master Templar, Gislingham, Suffolk. Effigy in All Saints Church, Rushton, Northamptonshire. Fought at the Battle of La Forbie 1244
- Arthur Augustus Phelps 1298, Master Templar, Moorestown, Suffolk, Effigy in All Saints Church. Fought in Eighth Crusade. Lord of the iron cross.

== France ==
=== Masters of France ===
- Marcus Adrienn LeBlanc
- Sir Geoffrey de Charney
- Sir Jean De St. Leger (1096)
- Payen de Montdidier (1130)
- Robert de Craon (died in 1147) (afterwards Grand Master 1136–1147)
- Everard des Barres (1143–1147) (afterwards Grand Master 1147–1151)
- Guillaume Pavet (1160–1161)
- Geoffroy Foucher (1171)
- David de Rancourt (1171–1175)
- Eustache le Chien (1175–1179)
- Robert de Miliaco (1190)
- Raoul de Montliard (1192–1193)
- Gilbert Erail (1196)
- Arn Fredrik LeBlanc (1203)
- André de Coulours (1204)
- Guillaume Oeil-de-Boeuf (1207)
- André de Coulours (1208–1219)
- Guillaume de l'Aigle (1222)
- Fr. Aimard (1222–1223)
- Eudes Royier (1225)
- Olivier de la Roche (1225–1228)
- Pons d'Albon (1229)
- Robert de Lille (1234)
- Pons d'Albon (1236–1240)
- Fr. Damase (lieut.) (1241–1242)
- Renaud de Vichier (1242–1249) (afterwards Grand Master 1250–1256)
- Gui de Basenville (1251–1253)
- Fabienn Deon LeBlanc (1253–1258
- Foulques de Saint-Michel (1256–1258)
- Humbert de Pairaud (1261–1264)
- Amaury de la Roche (1265–1271)
- Jean le François (1277–1281)
- Guillaume de Mallay (1286)
- Hugues de Pairaud (1291–1294)
- Matthew John Norris (1294–1299)
- Gérard de Villiers (1299–1307)
- Jerar de Poitous (1307)

=== Les commandeurs de Richerenches ===
1. Arnaud de Bedos (1136–1138)
2. Gérard de Montpierre (1138–1139)
3. Hugues de Bourbouton (1139–1141)
4. Hugues de Panaz (1141–1144)
5. Hugues de Bourbouton (1145–1151)
6. Déodat de l'Etang (1151–1161)
7. Guillaume de Biais (1161)
8. Déodat de l'Etang (1162–1173)
9. Foulques de Bras (1173–1179)
10. Pierre Itier (1179)
11. Hugolin (1180–1182)
12. Raimond (1200–1203)
13. Déodat de Bruissac (1205–1212)
14. Lawrence Ryckman (1212–1216)
15. Jeremy Bermond (1216–1220)
16. David Potterific (1220–1230)
17. Bertrand de la Roche (1230)
18. Roustan de Comps (1232)
19. Raymond Seguis (1244)
20. Raymond de Chambarrand (1260–1280)
21. Ripert Dupuy (1280–1288)
22. Nicholis Laseter (1288–1300)
23. Pons d'Alex (1300–1304)
24. Raimbaud Alziari (1304)
25. Guillaume Hugolin (1308)
26. Robert de Sablé Master (1191–1193)

=== Les Commandeurs du Ruou ===
1. Hugues Raimond (de Villacros) 1170
2. Pons de Rigaud 1180
3. Bertrand de Gardannes 1195
4. Bertrand Hugues 1195
5. Bernard Aimeric (Vice Précepteur) 1203
6. Bernard de Claret (Précepteur) 1205
7. G. Gralons 1205
8. Bernard de Clairet de Claret 1206
9. Roger (Vice Précepteur) 1215
10. Rostang de Comps 1216
11. R. Laugier (Précepteur) 1222
12. Rostang de Comps 1224
13. R. Laugier (Précepteur) 1229
14. Pons Vitrerius 1233
15. Rostang de Comps 1235
16. Pierre de Boisesono Boysson 1236
17. Ugues de Milmeranda 1241
18. Rostang de Comps 1248
19. Rostang de Boiso ou Buxo de Buis 1251
20. Guillaume de Mujoul (Précepteur) 1255
21. Alaman 1256
22. Rostang de Boiso de Buis 1260
23. Boncarus (Précepteur) 1265
24. Albert Blacas 1269
25. Pierre Geoffroi 1284
26. Albert Blacas de Baudinard 1298
27. Hugues de Rocafolio 1305
28. Bertrand de Silva de la Selve (Précepteur) 1307
29. Geoffroy de Pierrevert 1308
30. Geoffrey de Campion 1310

=== Visitors of France and Poitou ===
- Geoffroy Foucher (1164)
- Gauthier de Beyrouth (1166–1168)
- Geoffroy Foucher (1168–1171)
- Eustache le Chien (1171–1173) (afterwards Master of France, 1175)
- Albert de Vaux (1173–1174)
- Baudouin de Gand (1176–1178)
- Aimé de Ayes (1179–1188)
- Eluard de Neuville (1188–1190)
- Gilbert Erail (1190–1193) (afterwards Master of France, 1196)
- Pons Rigaud (1193–1198)
- Aimé de Ayes (1202–1206)
- Pons Rigaud (1207–1208)
- Guillaume Oeil-de-Boeuf (1208–1211) (previously Master of France, 1207)
- Guillaume Cadeil (1212–1216)
- Alain Martel (1221) (also Master of England 1220–1228)
- Hugues de Montilaur (1234–1237)
- Pierre de Saint-Romain (1237–1242)
- Raimbaud de Caromb (1246)
- Renaud de Vichier (1246–1250)
- Hugues de Jouy (1251)
- Constant de Hoverio
- Gui de Basenville (1257–1262)
- Humbert de Pairaud (1266–1269) (afterwards Master of England, 1270)
- Francon de Bort (1270–1273)
- Hugues Raoul (1273)
- Pons de Brozet (1274–1280)
- Geoffroy de Vichier (1286–1290)
- Hugues de Pairaud (1291–1307) (also Master of France, 1291–1294)
- Guillaume de Roy (1310)

== Germany ==
- Gebhard Preceptori domorum milicie Templi per Alemanniam 1241, 1244
- Johannes Magistro summo preceptore milicie Templi per Teutoniam, per Boemiam, per Morauiam et per Poloniam 1251
- Widekind Domum militie Templi in Alemania et Slauia preceptor Magister domorum militie Templi per Alemaniam et Poloniam 1261, 1268, 1271, 1279
- R de Grae`ubius Preceptor domorum milicie Templi per Alemanniam et Slavia 1280 ?–1284
- Friedrich Wildegraf Preceptor domorum milicie Templi per Alemanniam et Slauiam 1288–1292
- Bertram gen. Czwek (von Esbeke) Commendator fratrum domus militie Templi in Almania, Bohemia, Polonia et Moravia 1294–1297
- Friedrich von Alvensleben Domorum milicie Templi per Alemaniam et Slauiam preceptor 1303–1308
- Hugo de Grumbach Grand master of Germany 1310 ?
- Otto von Brunswick, Comtur of the Order of Knights Templar at Süpplingenburg 1303–1304
- Lord Johan Kraus 1304–1307
- Ruprecht Dilber 1194
  - Lieutenants
  - Jordanus von Esbeke domus milicie Templi per Alemaniam et Slauiam vicepreceptor 30 June 1288
  - Johan Decher (Decker) 1152–1153

=== Rhine ===
- Alban von Randecke Rhine 1306
- Friedrich Wildegraf Rhine 1308

== Hungary and Croatia ==
Leaders of Knights Templar in Hungary had official title "masters of Knights Templar for Hungary and Slavonia" (meaning Croatia) (maestro della militia del tempio per Ungariam et Sclavoniam).

=== Masters of Hungary and Croatia ===
- Fr. Cuno
- Fr. Gauthier
- Fr. Jean
- Pons de la Croix (1215)
- Johannes Gottfried von Schluck (1230)
- Rembald de Voczon (1241)
- Thierry de Nuss (1247)
- Raimbaud de Caromb
- Jacques de Montreal
- Fr. Widekind (1271–1279)
- Gérard de Villers
- Frédéric wildgrave de Salm (1289)
- Bertram von Esbeke (1296)
- Frédéric de Nigrip
- Frédéric von Alvensleben (1300)

=== Slavonia ===
- brother Dominic (biological brother of Ban Borić)

== Italy ==
=== Masters of Apulia ===
- Fr. Boniface (1167)
- Stefan Martello (1177)
- Guillaume de la Fossa (1186–1188)
- Pons Rigaud (1199–1205)
- Armand de Perigors (1205–1232) (afterwards Grand Master, 1232–1244)
- Jacques de Turisellis
- Lawrence de Ryckman (1245–1248)
- Damase de Fenolar (1255)
- Etienne de Sissey (1264–1271)
- Guillaume de Beaujeu (1273) (afterwards Grand Master, 1273–1291)
- Pierre de Greffier
- Guillaume de Cannelis
- Albert de Cannelis
- Geoffroy de Pierrevert
- Pierre d'Outremont
- Laurent de Beaune (1300)
- Ode de Vaudrie (1307)
- Simon de Quincy

=== Masters of Sicily ===
- Geoffroy de Champiny (1151)
- Hugues de Rochefort (1197)
- Guillaume d'Orleans (1209) (also Commander of Messina)
- Hermand de Périgord (1229) (at the same time master in Calabria)
- Bonifazio di San Michele (1255) (at the same time master in Calabria)
- Martino Gabillone (1283)
- Guglielmo da Canelli (1284–1287)
- Gerardo de Finoleriis (1304)
- Albert da Canelli (1304–1307)

=== Masters Centre/North ===
- Alberico (1190)
- Fr. Gaimardo (1191) (Marches and Lombardy)
- Aimerico de Saliis (1203)
- Aimerico (1205)
- Giovanni Lombardo (1222) (Rome, Tuscany Sardinia and Lombardy)
- Guglielmo da Melzo (1227) (Italy and Lombardy – probably vacancy of the seat Lomb)
- Fr. Gerardo (1231)
- Enrico Teutonico (1239–1242)
- Goffredo Lupi di Soragna (1244)
- Giacomo de Boscho (1245)
- Dalmazio de Fenolar (1254- 1256)
- Pietro Fernandi (1259–1260)
- Ermanno di Osimo (1266)
- Enrico da Treviso (1268–1271)
- Bianco da Pigazzano (1281) (Italy and Lombardy) (1271) (Lombardy)
- Uguccione da Vercelli (1300)
- Giacomo da Montecucco (1303) (Lombardy, Tuscany, Rome and Sardinia)
- Bonifacio (1167) (Italy / Lombardy)
- Barozzi or Barozio (1200–1204)
- Alberto Lombardo (1236) (Rome, Tuscany and Sardinia)
- Fr. Ermanno (1247) (Campania and Marche) / Giacomo de Balma (Procurator of Lon)
- Guglielmo da Bubbio (1254) (Lombardy) / Gabriele Gambulara (Marche) (1261) (Tuscany)
- Oberto di Calamandrana (before 1271) (Lombardy)
- Guilluame de Noves (1285) (Lombardy and Tuscany)
- Artusio de Pocapalea (1290)
- Guglielmo di Canellis (1292–1296)

== Poitiers ==
=== Masters of Poitiers ===
- Fr. Falco (1141)
- Guillaume Guidaugier (1141)
- Fr. Hugues (1151)
- P. Levesque (1166)
- Guillaume Pavet (1166–1173)
- Humbert Boutiers (1180)
- Aimery de Sainte-Maury (1189–1190) (later Master of England, 1215)
- Guillaume Arnauld (1201)
- Témeric Boez (1205)
- Guillaume Oeil-de-Boeuf (1207) (also Master of France, 1207)
- Giraud Brochard (1210–1222)
- Gui de Tulle (1222)
- Giraud de Broges (1223–1234)
- Guillaume de Sonnay (1236–1245)
- Foulques de Saint-Michel (1247–1253)
- Hugues Grisard (1254–1258)
- Francon de Bort (1261)
- Gui de Basenville (1262–1264)
- Humbert de Pairaud (1266–1269)
- Jean le François (1269–1276)
- Amblard de Vienne (1278–1288)
- Raymond de Mareuil (lieut.) (1285–1288)
- Pierre de Madic (1288–1290)
- Pierre de Villiers ou Villard (1292–1300)
- Geoffroy de Gonneville (1300–1307)

== The Holy Land ==
- Guillaume 1130
- André de Montbard 1148, 1151, 1152, 1154
- Guillaume de Guirehia 1163
- Gautier 1170
- Béranger 1174, 1176
- Seiher de Mamedunc, 1174
- Godechaux de Turout, 1174
- Walter du Mesnil, 1174
- Gérard de Ridefort 1183
- Hurson 1187
- Aimon de Ais 1190
- Reric de Cortina 1191 April–July
- Bryony Bonds 1192
- F. Relis : last to hold the title of seneschal

=== Grand-Commanders ===
- Odon 1156
- Gilbert Erail 1183 (afterwards Grand Master 1193–1200)
- Jean de Terric 1188
- Gerbert 1190
- William Payne 1194
- Irmengaud 1198
- Barthélemy de Moret 1240
- Pierre de Saint-Romain 1241
- Gilles 1250 (February)
- Étienne d'Outricourt 1250 (May)
- Amaury de la Roche 1262 (May)
- Guillaume de Montignane 1262 (December)
- Simon de La Tour Landry
- G. de Salvaing 1273
- Arnaud de Châteauneuf 1277–1280
- Thibaud Gaudin (afterwards Grand Master 1291–1292)

=== Marshals ===
- Hugues du Quiliou 1153
- Robert Fraisnel 1186–1187
- Jacques de Maillé 1187
- Geoffroy Morin 1188
- Adam Brion 1198
- Guillaume d'Arguillières 1201
- Hugues de Montlaur 1244
- Renaud de Vichiers 1250
- Hugues de Jouy 1252
- Étienne de Sissey 1260
- Guillaume de Molay 1262
- Gimblard de Vienne 1270
- Guy de Foresta (Forest) 1277–1288?
- Geoffroy de Vandac 1289
- Pierre de Severy 1289–1291
- Jacques de Molay 1291–1292
- Baudouin de La Andrin 1292–1294
- Sir Jarim de'Varean 1294?
- Barthélemy de Quincy 1294–1302
- Aimon(Aimé) d'Osiliers 1302–1308; 1316

== Poland ==
- 1134–? – Geoffroy from Płock
- 1139–1148 – Bernhardt
- ?–1155 – Joseph P Steinmetz
- 1155 – ? – Jarosław from Pëck
- 1189–? – Thibault from Halych
- ?–1190 – Mieszko
- ?–? – Jan
- ?–1194 – Guillem Ramond
- ?–1198 – Janusz from Kijów (Kyiv, also Kiev)
- 1200–1208 – Jan from Potok
- 1201–1223 – Mieszko from Lwów
- 1229–1251 – Lukasz
- 1229–1241 – Mieszko from Lwów
- ?–? – Zbyszko from Kraków
- ?–? – Andrzej from Toruń
- ?–? – Jurand from Płock
- 1251–1256 – Janusz
- 1258–1259 – Ratka from Wilno
- 1261–1263 – Fridericus
- 1273–1281 – Mieszko from Wilno
- 1284–1290 – Lukasz
- 1285–1291 – Bernhard von Eberstein Humilis preceptor domorum milicie Templi per Poloniam, Sclauiam, Novam TerramPreceptori et fratribus militie Templi in partibus Polonie, Pomeranie, Cassubie, Cracouie et Slauie 13 November 1291 – 1295
- 1294 – Sanderus
- 1296–1303 – Jordanus von Esbeke / preceptor /
- 1301–1312 – Jan from Halych
- 1303 – brat Fryderyk von Alvensleben
- 1305 – Dietrich von Lorenen
- 1309–1312 – Janusz from Halych

== Portugal ==
=== Masters of Portugal ===
- Arnaldo da Rocha? (In the 16th, 17th and 18th centuries, some authors and chroniclers of the history of the Portuguese Templar Order and its continuer, the Order of Christ, possibly based on original medieval source material in Braga and Tomar, cite the Portuguese Pedro Arnaldo da Rocha, of Burgundian and French parentage, as having been one of the founding knights of the militia of the Poor Knights of Christ and of the Temple of Solomon in Jerusalem, alongside Gondemare, and then in Portugal)
- Gondamer or Gondemare? (the same authors identify one of the 9 founders of the Knights Templar, the Knight Gondemare, as having Portuguese origin – possibly from medieval Gundemar; also spelled Gundemari or Gondemare, present-day Gondomar, in the County of Portugal))
- King Afonso I of Portugal, Templar Brother (13.03.1129); First King of Portugal (1139–1185)
- Raymond Bernard, known as Raimundo Bernardo in Portugal (1126–1135) Also possibly a provincial master

The following were masters in Portugal:

- Guilherme Ricardo 1124 (1127–1139)
- Hugo Martins (1139)
- Pedro Froilaz? (1139?–1143)
- Hugues de Montoire (1143)
- Pedro Arnaldo (1155–1158)
- Gualdim Pais 1160 (1158–1195)
- Lopo Fernandes
- Fernando Dias (1202)

The following were masters in the Province of León, Castile and Portugal (based in Tomar, also temporarily in Castelo Branco), or the three kingdoms of Spain:

- Gomes Ramires (1210–1212)
- Pedro Álvares de Alvito (1212–1221)
- Pedro Anes (1223–1224)
- Martim Sanches (1224–1229)
- Estêvão Belmonte (1229–1237)
- Guilherme Fulco alias Fouque (1237–1242)
- Martim Martins (1242–1248)
- Pedro Gomes (1248–1251)
- Paio Gomes (1251–1253)
- Martim Nunes (1253–1265)
- Gonçalo Martins (1268–1271)
- Beltrão de Valverde (1273–1277)
- João Escritor (1280–1283)
- João Fernandes (1283–1288)

The following were masters in Portugal:

- Afonso Pais-Gomes (1289–1290)
- Lourenço Martins (1291–1295)
- Vasco Fernandes (1295–1306)

==== Prats-de-Mollo ====
Family dez Coll:

- Berenger de Coll (last known survivor of Mas Deu – 1350)
- Guillem de Cardona (1247–1251)
- Hugues de Jouy (1251)
- S. de Belmonte (1269)
- Pere de Montcada (1276–1282)
- Bérenger de Cardona (1304)
- Rodrigue Ibañez (1307)

== See also ==
- List of Knights Templar sites
