= Molay =

Molay may refer to:

Persons

- Jacques de Molay (c. 1240–1314), the last Grand Master of the Knights Templar, who fought in Syria
- Mulay or Molay, Mongol general circa 1300 who was active in Syria and Palestine

Places

- Molay, Jura, a commune in the French department of Jura
- Molay, Haute-Saône, a commune in the French department of Haute-Saône
- Môlay, a commune in the French department of Yonne
- Le Molay-Littry, a commune in the French department of Calvados

Organizations

- DeMolay International, social fraternity sponsored by Freemasons
