= Grand Master of the Knights =

Grand Master of the Knights may refer to:

- List of grand masters of the Knights Hospitaller
- List of grand masters of the Knights Templar
- List of Knights Templar
- Grand Master of the Teutonic Order
