= Gilbert Horal =

Grand Master of the Knights Templar

- Coat of arms of Gilbert Horal

12th Grand Master of the Knights Templar
- In office 1193–1200
- Preceded by: Robert IV of Sablé
- Succeeded by: Philippe du Plessis

Personal details
- Born: Unknown Kingdom of Aragon
- Died: December 1200

Military service
- Allegiance: Knights Templar
- Rank: Grand Master
- Battles/wars: Reconquista

Gilbert Horal or Erail (died December 1200) was the 12th Grand Master of the Knights Templar from 1193 to 1200.

== Personal details ==
Gilbert Horal was born an Aragonese (from the Kingdom of Aragon in modern-day Spain), and entered the Templars at a young age. He stayed in the provinces of Provence and Aragon, where he took part in the battles of the Reconquista on the Iberian Peninsula, and became Grand Master of the province until 1190. Then he became the Grand Preceptor of France, and in 1193, after the death of Robert de Sablé, he became Grand Master of the Order. In 1194, Pope Celestine III gave the Templars more privileges.

Horal was known for wanting peace between the Christians and the Muslims, committing himself to making sure that Christians respected the treaty of Jaffa. Some disagreed and thought that this showed treason and collusion with the enemy.

During his leadership, the quarrel between the Templars and Hospitaliers increased. The two orders engaged in combat against each other over the possessions of castles. The arbitration of Pope Innocent III was in favor of the Hospitaliers because the Pope could not forgive the Templars for making the agreements that they had with Malek-Adel, brother of Saladin.

Another of Gilbert Horal's accomplishments was that he took the time to organize and consolidate the possessions of the Templars in France and Apulia. In Spain, the Templars took an active part in the Reconquista, and in 1196 were given the fortress of Alfambra by Alfonso II of Aragon as a reward for their efforts in the battles. He died in 1200, shortly before the beginning of the Fourth Crusade.

== See also ==
- History of the Knights Templar
- List of Knights Templar

Religious titles
Preceded by Robert de Sablé	Grand Master of the Knights Templar; 1193–1200	Succeeded by Philippe du Plessis
