= Geoffroi de Charney =

French Knight Templar (d. 1314)

The beaucéant (standard) was half white and half black to which a red cross was added by Eugenius III with its legend Non Nobis Domine, from first verse of Psalm 115.

Geoffroi de Charney, (Note: The first name was sometimes spelled Geoffrey, surname sometimes spelled de Charnay and de Charny.) also known as Guy d'Auvergne, (died 11 or 18 March 1314) was preceptor of Normandy for the Knights Templar. In 1307 de Charny was arrested, along with the entire Order of Knights Templar in France, and in 1314 was burned at the stake.

== Early life ==
Not much is known about de Charney's early life. He was accepted into the Order of Knights Templar at a young age by Amaury de la Roche, Preceptor of France. Present at the ceremony was Jean le Franceys, the preceptor of Pédenac.

== Persecution of the Templars ==
The Order of the Templars was originally created to protect pilgrims on the road to Jerusalem. The Templars' mission was then expanded to fight in the Crusades.

The persecution of the Templars began in France as a plan by King Philip IV, with the complicity of Pope Clement V. On 13 October 1307, the King ordered an arrest of all Templars in France. On 22 November 1307 Clement V, under pressure from the King, issued the papal decree Pastoralis praceminentiae that ordered all Christian monarchs to arrest any Templars and confiscate their lands in the name of the Pope and the Church. Though the order went out to England, Iberia, Germany, Italy and Cyprus, Templar Grand Master Jacques de Molay, Geoffrey de Charney and many other Templars were in France, and under the orders of the French king, were arrested and tortured until they confessed to the crimes of which they were accused.

In 1307, the Pope sent two cardinals to interview Jacques de Molay and Hugues de Pairaud, who recanted their confessions and told the other Templars to do the same. Two other Templars, Pierre de Bologna and Renaud de Provins, also tried to convince other Templars to recant their confessions and by early May 1310, close to six hundred did so. Pierre de Bologna was never seen again and Renaud de Provins was later sentenced to life imprisonment.

=== Initial charges ===
Geoffroi de Charney and the other Templars in France were arrested on 13 October 1307. Many charges were leveled against them; they were notably similar to those directed at other enemies of Philip, such as heresy, sodomy and blasphemy.

There were initially five charges lodged against the Templars:

- The first was renouncing Christ and spitting on the cross during initiation into the Order.
- The second was that the initiate was allegedly stripped and thrice kissed by the preceptor, on his navel, posterior and mouth.
- The third was telling the neophyte (novice) that unnatural lust was lawful and indulged in commonly.
- The fourth was that the cord worn by the neophyte day and night was "consecrated" by wrapping it around an idol in the form of a human head with a great beard, and that this idol was adored in all chapters.
- The fifth was that the priests of the order did not consecrate the host in celebrating Mass.

Many of these charges were also made against Pope Boniface VIII before his capture, escape and eventual death shortly in 1303. Philip's agents pursued these charges as they had been successful against other enemies of the King. On 12 August 1308, the charges were increased, with one specifically stating that the Templars worshipped an idol made of a cat and a head with three faces. The lists of articles 86 to 127 would add many other charges.

=== Recantation and death of Templar leaders in France ===
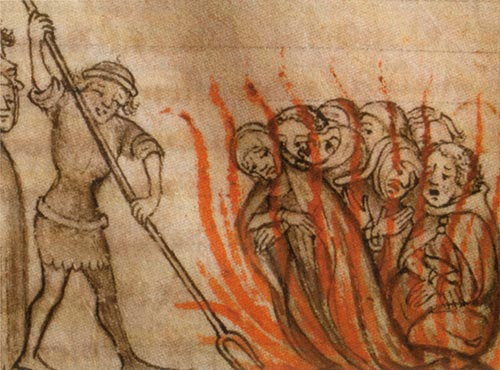
Templars being burned at the stake.

Eventually King Philip's Inquisitors succeeded in making Jacques de Molay confess to the charges. On 18 March 1314, de Molay and de Charney recanted their confessions, stating they were innocent of the charges and they were only guilty of betraying their Order by confessing under duress to something they did not do. They were immediately found guilty of being relapsed heretics, for which the punishment was death. This effectively silenced the other Templars. Philip continued to pressure and threaten the Pope to officially disband the Order, which culminated in 1314 with the public execution by burning of leader Jacques de Molay and Geoffroi de Charney.

== Death ==
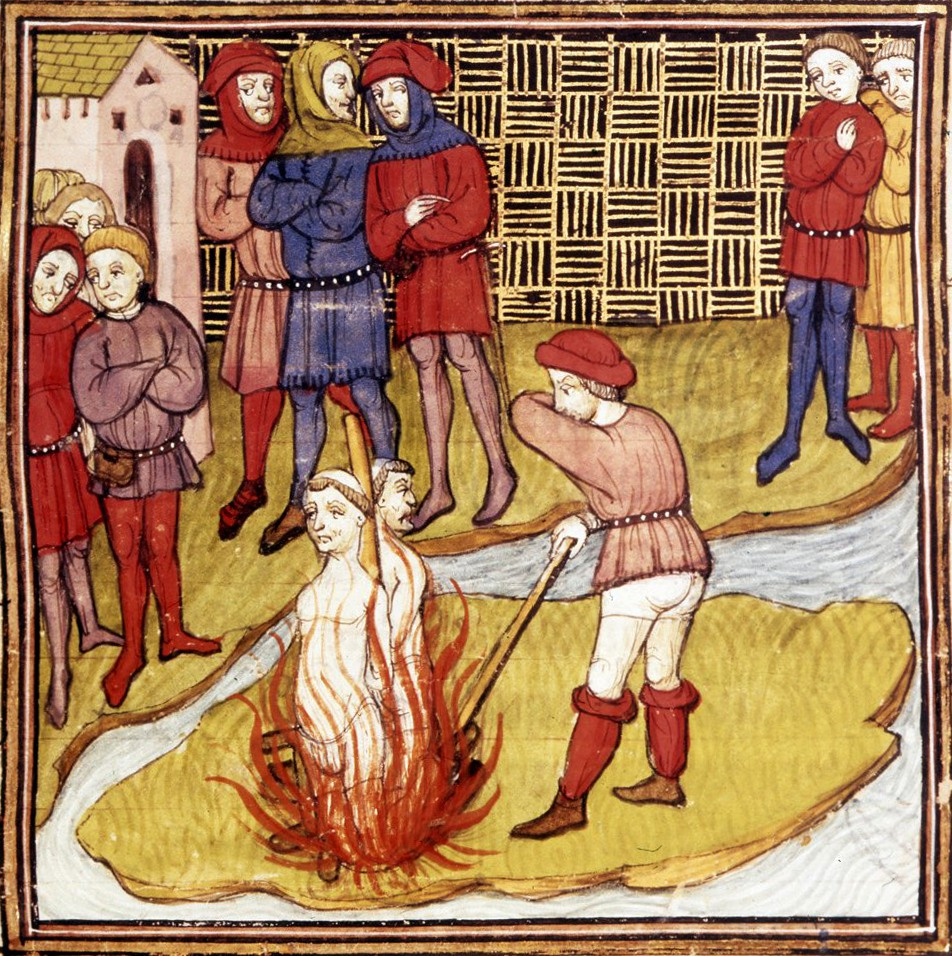
The Burning of the Templars at Paris. Original owned by the British Library

His exact day of death is disputed by scholars. One source records his death as follows: The cardinals dallied with their duty until 19 March 1314, when, on a scaffold in front of Notre Dame, de Molay, Geoffroi de Charney, Master of Normandy, Hugues de Peraud, referred to as a visitor of France, and Godefroi de Gonneville, Master of Aquitaine, were brought forth from the jail in which for nearly seven years they had lain, to receive the sentence agreed upon by the cardinals, in conjunction with the Archbishop of Sens and some other prelates whom they had called in. Considering the offences which the culprits had confessed and confirmed, the penalty imposed was in accordance with the rule—that of perpetual imprisonment. The affair was supposed to be concluded when, to the dismay of the prelates and wonderment of the assembled crowd, de Molay and Geoffroi de Charney arose. They had been guilty, they said, not of the crimes imputed to them, but of basely betraying their Order to save their own lives. It was pure and holy; the charges were fictitious and the confessions false. Hastily the cardinals delivered them to the Prevot of Paris, and retired to deliberate on this unexpected contingency, but they were saved all trouble. When the news was carried to Philippe he was furious. The King was furious and they were both pronounced relapsed heretics to be burned without a further hearing; the facts were notorious and no formal judgment by the papal commission need be waited for. That same day, by sunset, a pile was erected on a small island in the Seine, the Ile des Juifs, near the palace garden. There de Molay and de Charney were slowly burned to death, refusing all offers of pardon for retraction, and bearing their torment with a composure which won for them the reputation of martyrs among the people, who reverently collected their ashes as relics.

== Legacy and the "curse" ==
Little more than a month later, Clement V died from a disease thought to have been lupus, and eight months later Philip IV was killed at the age of forty-six in a hunting accident. Their deaths gave rise to the legend that de Molay had cited them before the tribunal of God. Such stories became legend. Even in distant Germany, Philippe's death was spoken of as retribution for his destruction of the Templars, and Clement was described as shedding tears of remorse on his death-bed for three great crimes, the poisoning of Henry VII, Holy Roman Emperor and the ruin of the Templars and the Beguines.

Author Malcolm Barber has researched this legend and concluded that it originates from La Chronique métrique attribuée à Geffroi de Paris (ed. A. Divèrres, Strasbourg, 1956, pages 5711-5742). Geoffrey of Paris was "apparently an eye-witness, who describes Molay as showing no sign of fear and, significantly, as telling those present that God would avenge their deaths".

This series of events forms the basis of Les Rois maudits (The Accursed Kings), a series of historical novels written by Maurice Druon between 1955 and 1977, in which Charney is a supporting character. The novels were also adapted into two French television miniseries in 1972 and 2005.
