= Philippe du Plessis =

13th Grand Master of the Knights Templar

- Coat of arms of Philippe du Plessis

13th Grand Master of the Knights Templar
- In office 1201–1208
- Preceded by: Gilbert Horal
- Succeeded by: Guillaume de Chartres

Personal details
- Born: 1165
- Died: 12 November 1209 (aged 43–44)

Philippe du Plessis (1165 – 12 November 1209) was the 13th Grand Master of the Knights Templar. He was born in the fortress of Plessis-Macé, Anjou, France. In 1189 he joined the Third Crusade as a simple knight, and discovered the Order of the Temple in Palestine. After the death of Gilbert Horal he became Grand Master. He helped uphold the treaty between Saladin and Richard I. In the renewal of this treaty in 1208 he suggested that the Teutonic Order and Hospitallers should make a new peace treaty offer with Malek-Adel. The accord was criticised by Pope Innocent III.

There were few military actions during his rule; the Fourth Crusade never arrived in the Holy Land. The King of Armenia was in opposition to the Knights regarding the Gastein stronghold. The Templars were initially expelled from Armenia, but the pope intervened in the dispute.

Relations with the Hospitaliers were tense. During his rule the Order of the Temple reached its greatest height in Europe.

His name is last documented in 1209.

Religious titles
Preceded by Gilbert Horal	Grand Master of the Knights Templar; 1201–1208	Succeeded by Guillaume de Chartres
