= Humbert de Pairaud =

Humbert de Pairaud was a dignitary of the Knights Templar in France and England from 1261 to 1275. He came from a noble family from Forez an old French province. He was installed as the commander of Ponthieu in 1257, master of the province of France (1261 and 1265), master of England and of Aquitaine between 1266 and 1271, and in the same period was the Visitor of France and England. Under his leadership, the following individuals were received into the Templars:

- Hugues de Pairaud, his nephew (1263)
- Jacques de Molay (1265)
