= Geoffroy Morin =

Marshal of the Knights Templar

Geoffroy Morin (died 1189) was Marshal of the Knights Templar during the mastership of Gerard of Ridefort.

== Biography ==
Geoffroy was probably from Thérouanne in the County of Flanders. The date of his departure for the Holy Land and his entry into the Order of the Temple are unknown. From 1187, he was appointed as Commander of the Order in Tyre. Then he was appointed Marshal of the Order by Gerard of Ridefort, probably in 1188 after the release of the Master of the Order, taken prisoner by the Muslims during the Battle of Hattin.

In 1189, he took part in the Siege of Acre, where he died alongside Gerard of Ridefort and eighteen other Templars. According to a contemporary poem, he died carrying the Baucent.

== Sources ==
- Burgtorf, Jochen (2008). The Central Convent of Hospitallers and Templars : History, Organization, and Personnel (1099/1120-1310). Brill. ISBN 978-90-04-16660-8.
- Grousset, René (1939). L'épopée des Croisades (in French).
- Guillaume-Rey, Emmanuel (1888). L'ordre du Temple en Syrie et à Chypre, les Templiers en Terre Sainte (in French). Revue de Champagne et de Brie.
