= Simon de Quincy =

Knight of the Knights Templar (1260–1307)

Grand Master of the Knights Templar
- In office 1280–1307

Personal details
- Born: 1260
- Died: 1307 Barletta,Italy
- Parent: Talairand (father)

Simon de Quincy (1260–1307) held the position of Grand Preceptor of the Kingdom of Sicily, one of the highest offices within the Templar Order in the Mediterranean region. Between 1284 and 1291, Simon de Quincy served as the Preceptor of the Domus of Prunay in France. In the early 1300s, he was Magister in Marseille. In 1304, he became Preceptor of Apulia, with his headquarters located in the Templar house just outside the urban walls of Barletta.

== Death and burial ==
Simon de Quincy died in Barletta on June 1307 and was buried in the Church of San Leonardo. His tomb was found in 1970 in Barletta, during some building excavations. Today it is preserved in the Civic Museum.
