= Robert of Milly =

Robert of Milly (French: Robert de Milly, Latin: Robertus de Miliaco; flourished 1161–1238) was the chamberlain (camerarius) of the County of Champagne from 1167 until his retirement in 1222. He was a Knight Templar and a patron of the order.

The first record of Robert is his witnessing a document in 1161. He was probably at least sixteen years old at the time. He soon obtained the office of chamberlain. He was not always the exclusive holder of the office, the functions of which are somewhat obscure. It has been likened to a treasurer, the count's personal financial manager or even a minister of the county's finances.

In 1190, Robert joined the Third Crusade. In preparation he donated ten arpents of land and a family of serfs at Trilbardou to the Templars of Moisy and in exchange he was taken into the order as a confrater (lay brother), his mother was to be commemorated at Moisy and his sister Amelia and her husband, Manasses, were to receive spiritual benefits from the Templars. This donation was made on the condition that he die without heirs, yet by 1203 he had two daughters. He must have renewed the gift, for the Templars eventually built a house at Trilbardou. He also leased some meadows at Orgeval to the Templars of Coulommiers for an annual rent of ten measures of grain, a fact confirmed by Count Theobald III of Champagne in a charter 1198. He also leased the mills of Montceaux to the Templars, sparking a dispute with the monks of Montier-la-Celle, which was not settled until 1216. In 1227, for forty sous, he exempted the Templars from rent for the grange at Champfleury, near Montceaux.

In 1203, Robert gave six pounds in annual tolls to the Oratory of the Paraclete. The donation was earmarked for the benefit of his daughters, who were living there, for the duration of their lives. In 1205, he was with the court of the child count, Theobald IV. In 1213, as a veteran of the Crusade, he was questioned concerning the legality of the marriage of Isabella I of Jerusalem to Count Henry II of Champagne, since she had previously been married to Lord Humphrey IV of Toron—who was still alive—and to the late Margrave Conrad of Montferrat.

In 1214, following the Battle of Bouvines, he served as a guarantor for the release of a prisoner taken by the French king, Philip Augustus, even though the knights of Champagne had fought on the French side at the battle. At that time, Robert held the rank of a banneret. This rank, coupled with his high position in witness lists, indicate an unusually high profile for a chamberlain. In 1221, on the eve of his retirement from public life, he signed a document recognising that the office of chamberlain was not hereditary. He was still living in 1238, and was almost certainly in his nineties.

== Sources ==
- Benton, John F. (1959). The Court of Champagne Under Henry the Liberal and Countess Marie (PhD diss.). Princeton University.
- Evergates, Theodore (2016). Henry the Liberal: Count of Champagne, 1127–1181. Philadelphia: University of Pennsylvania Press.
- Hill, Erica (1999). "Lineage Interests and Nonreproductive Strategies". Human Nature. 10 (2): 109–34. doi:10.1007/s12110-999-1011-z. PMID 26196139. S2CID 25726658.
- Schenk, Jochen (2012). Templar Families: Landowning Families and the Order of the Temple in France, c. 1120–1307. Cambridge: Cambridge University Press.
