= Molay, Haute-Saône =

Molay
- Commune
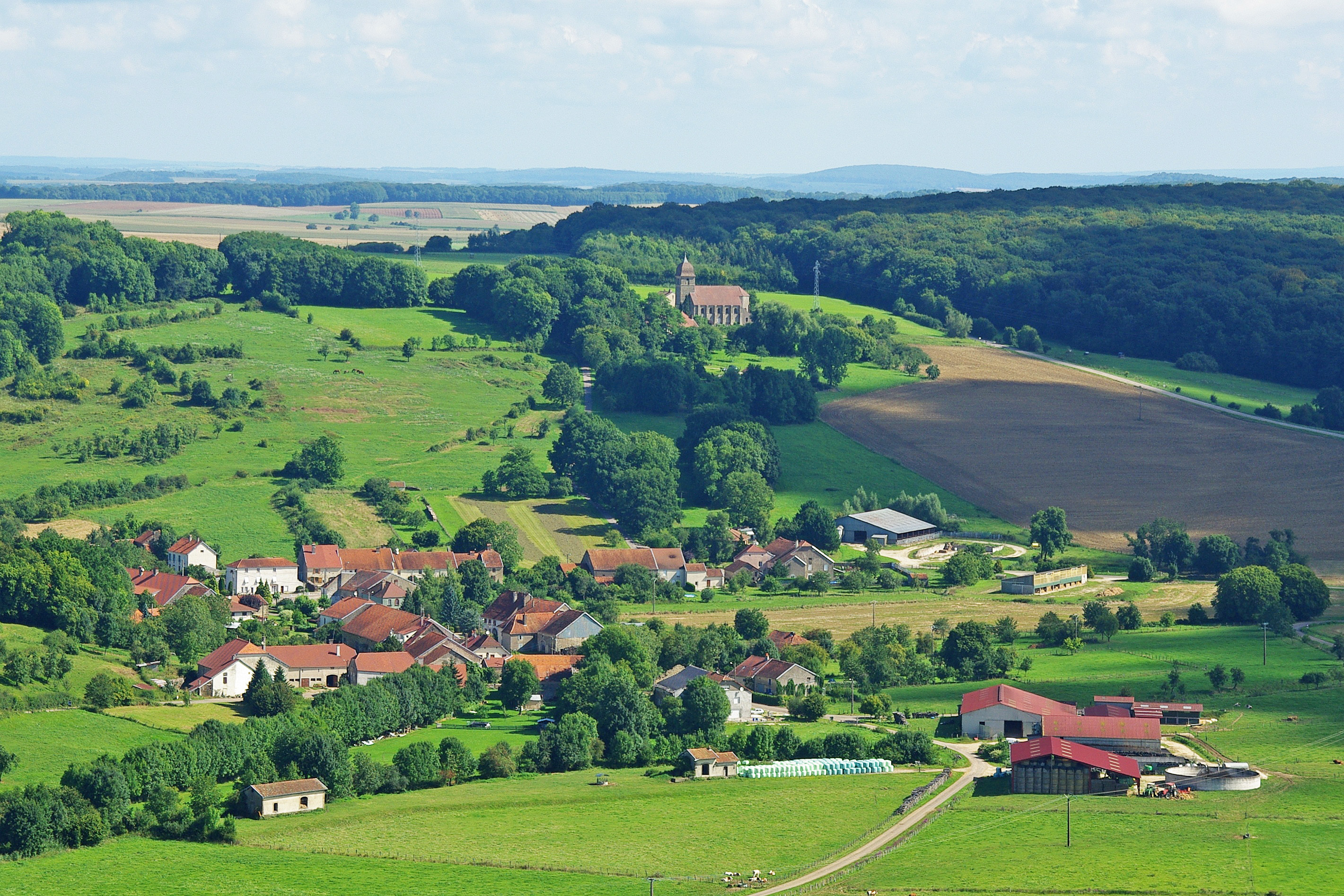
- A general view of Molay

- Coat of arms
- Location of Molay
- Location within France Location within Bourgogne-Franche-Comté
- Coordinates: 47°43′58″N 5°44′31″E
- Country: France
- Region: Bourgogne-Franche-Comté
- Department: Haute-Saône
- Arrondissement: Vesoul
- Canton: Jussey

Government
  - Mayor (2020–2026): Pascal Doussot
- Area^{1}: 7.66 km^{2} (2.96 sq mi)
- Highest elevation: 426 m (1,398 ft)
- Lowest elevation: 254 m (833 ft)
- Population (2023): 66
  - Density: 8.6/km^{2} (22/sq mi)
- Time zone: UTC+01:00 (CET)
  - Summer (DST): UTC+02:00 (CEST)
- INSEE/Postal code: 70350 /70120
- ^{1} French Land Register data, which excludes lakes, ponds, glaciers > 1 km^{2} (0.386 sq mi or 247 acres) and river estuaries.

Molay (French pronunciation: [mɔlɛ]) is a commune in the Haute-Saône department in the region of Bourgogne-Franche-Comté in eastern France.

== Notable people ==
- Jacques de Molay, last Grand Master of the Knights Templar, was born in Molay.

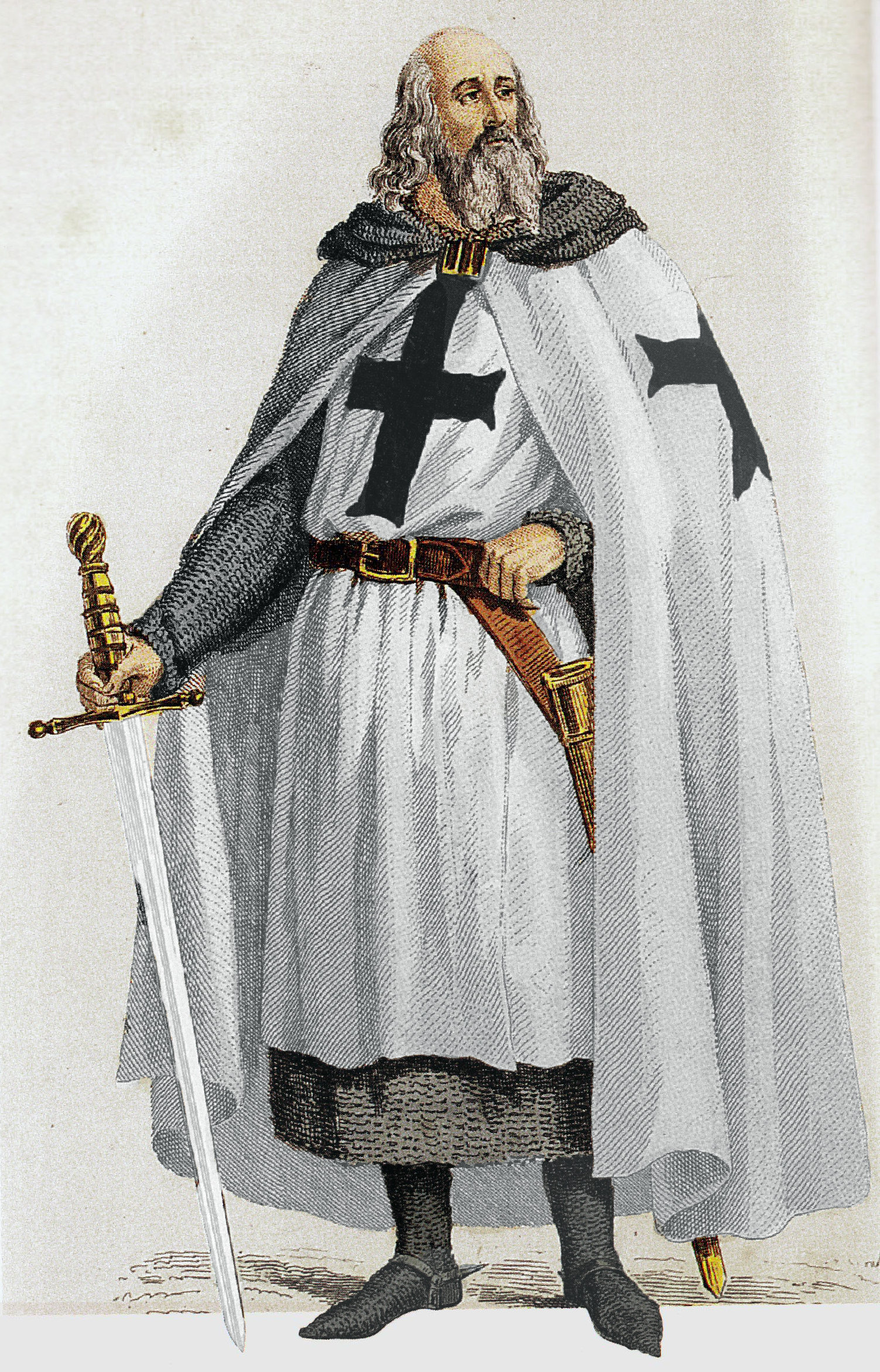

== See also ==
- Communes of the Haute-Saône department
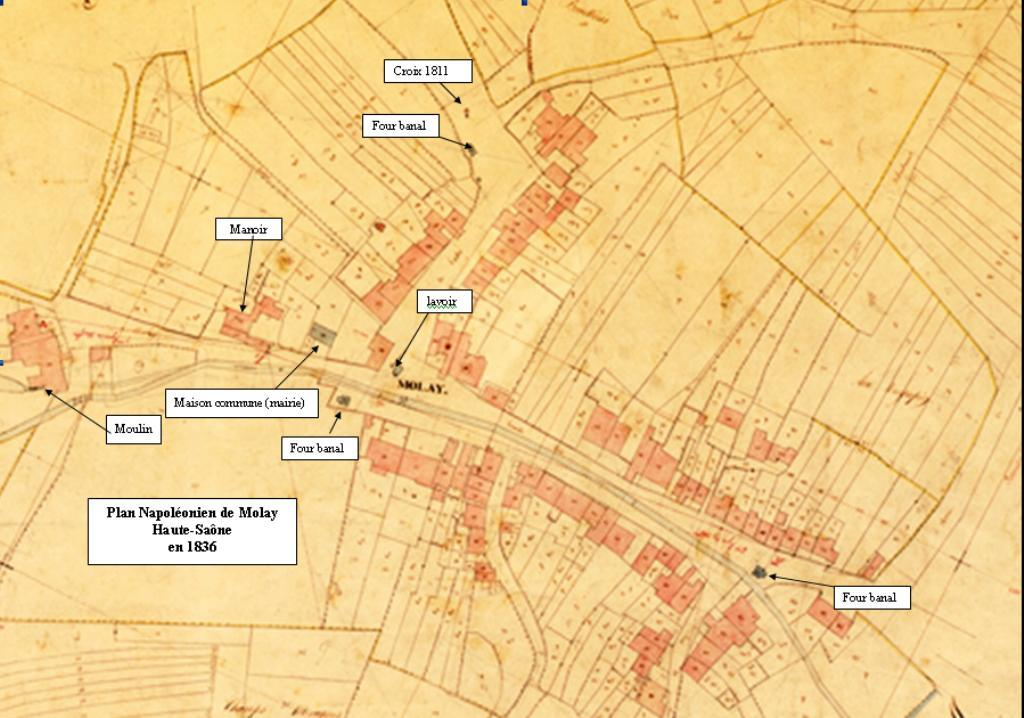
1836 Molay

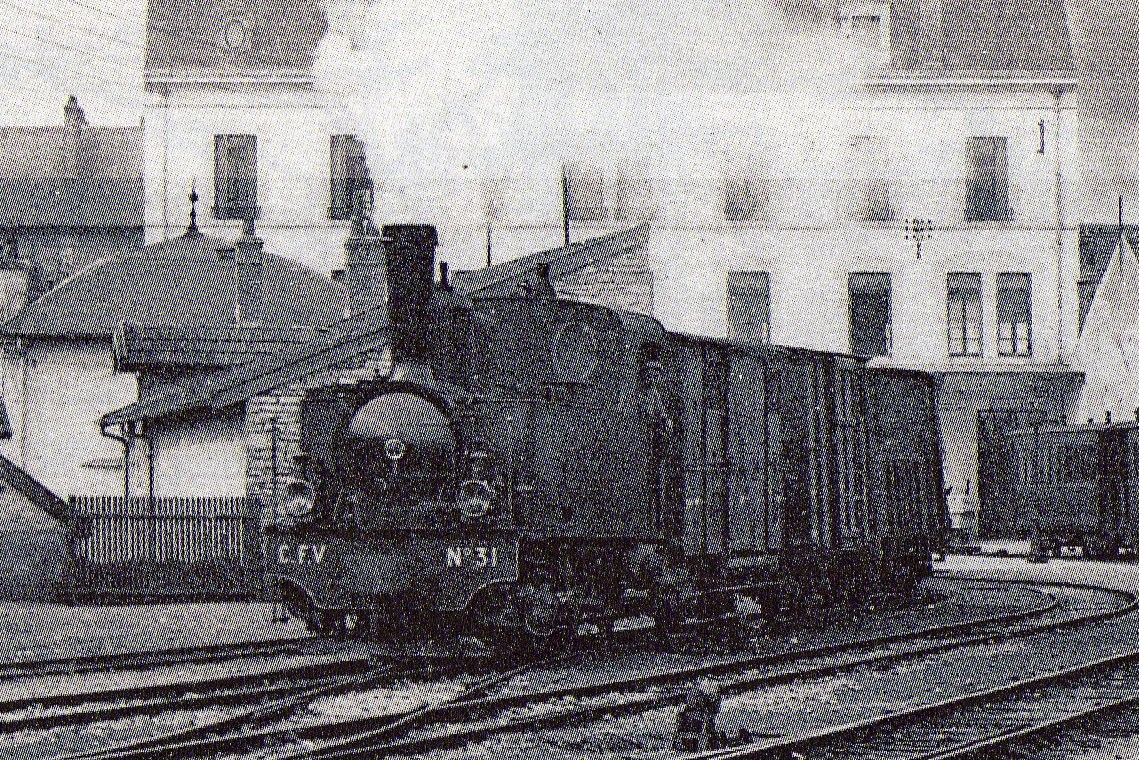
1910 Vesoul Molay.

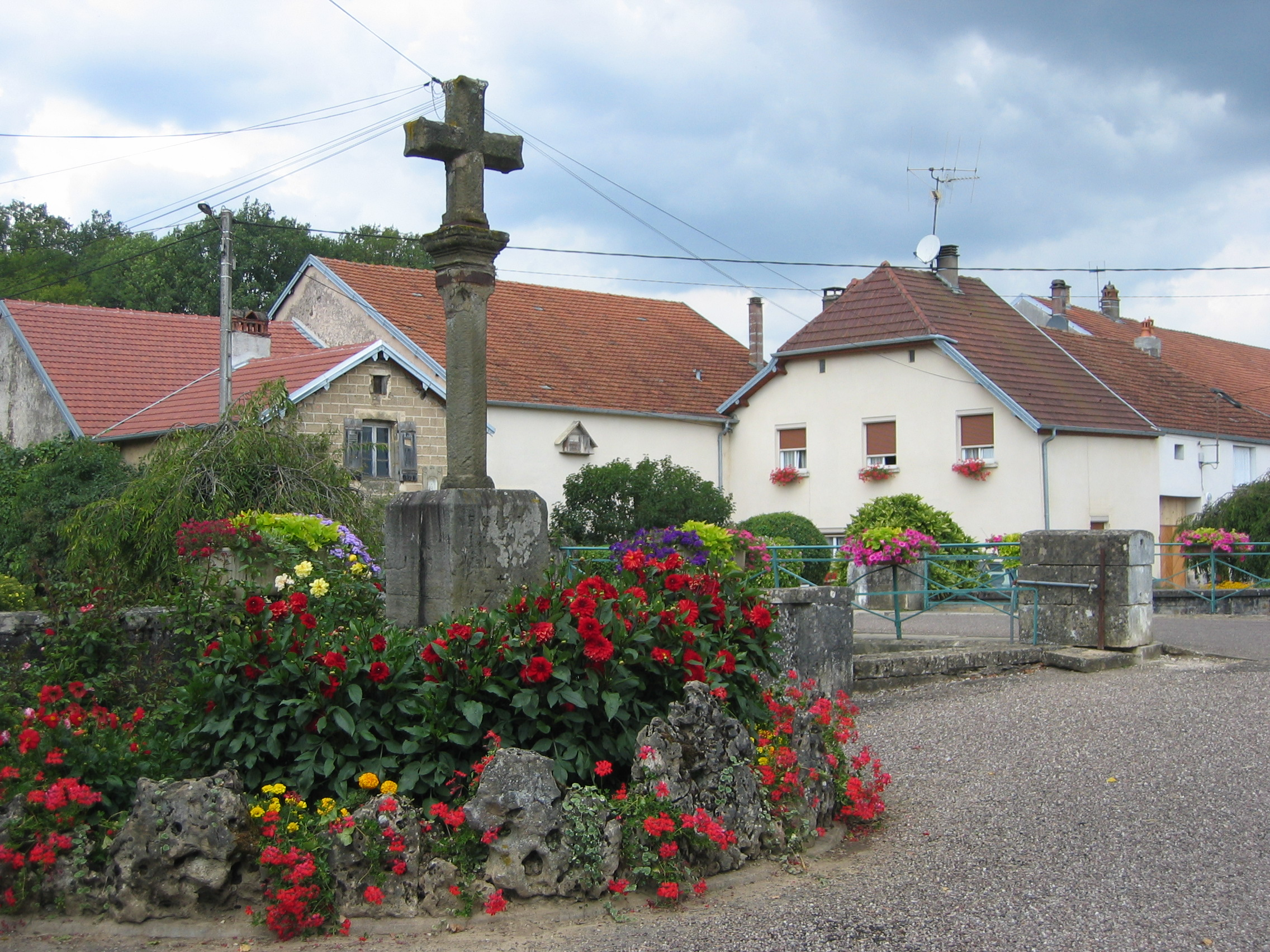
1989 Flower Molay

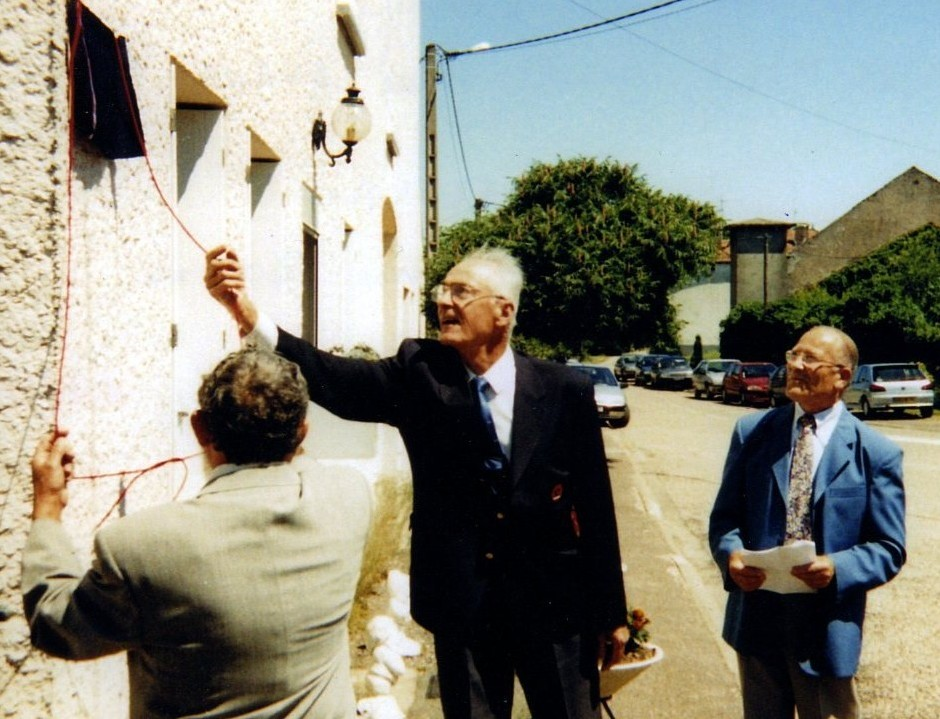
17/06/2000 Jean Valnet Place

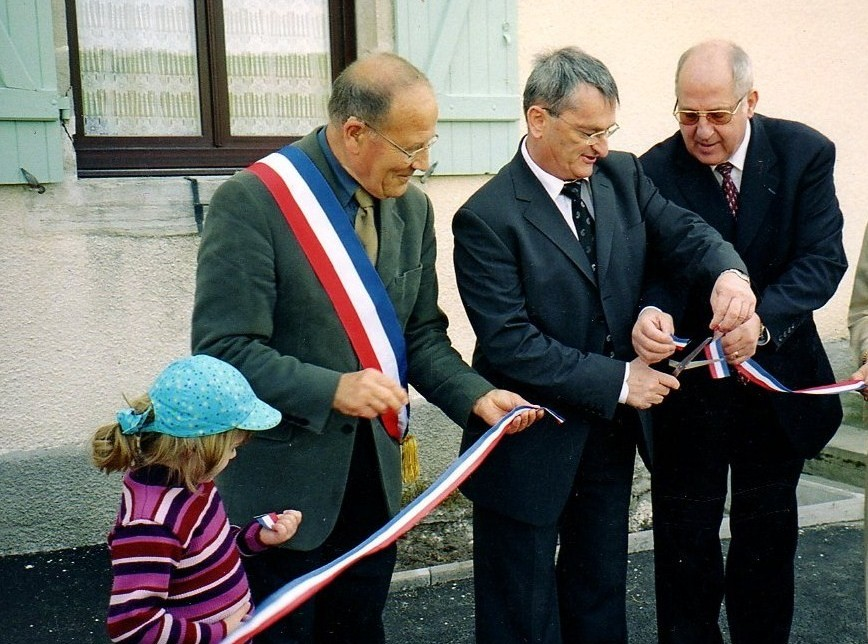
2004 mayor Multon Charles

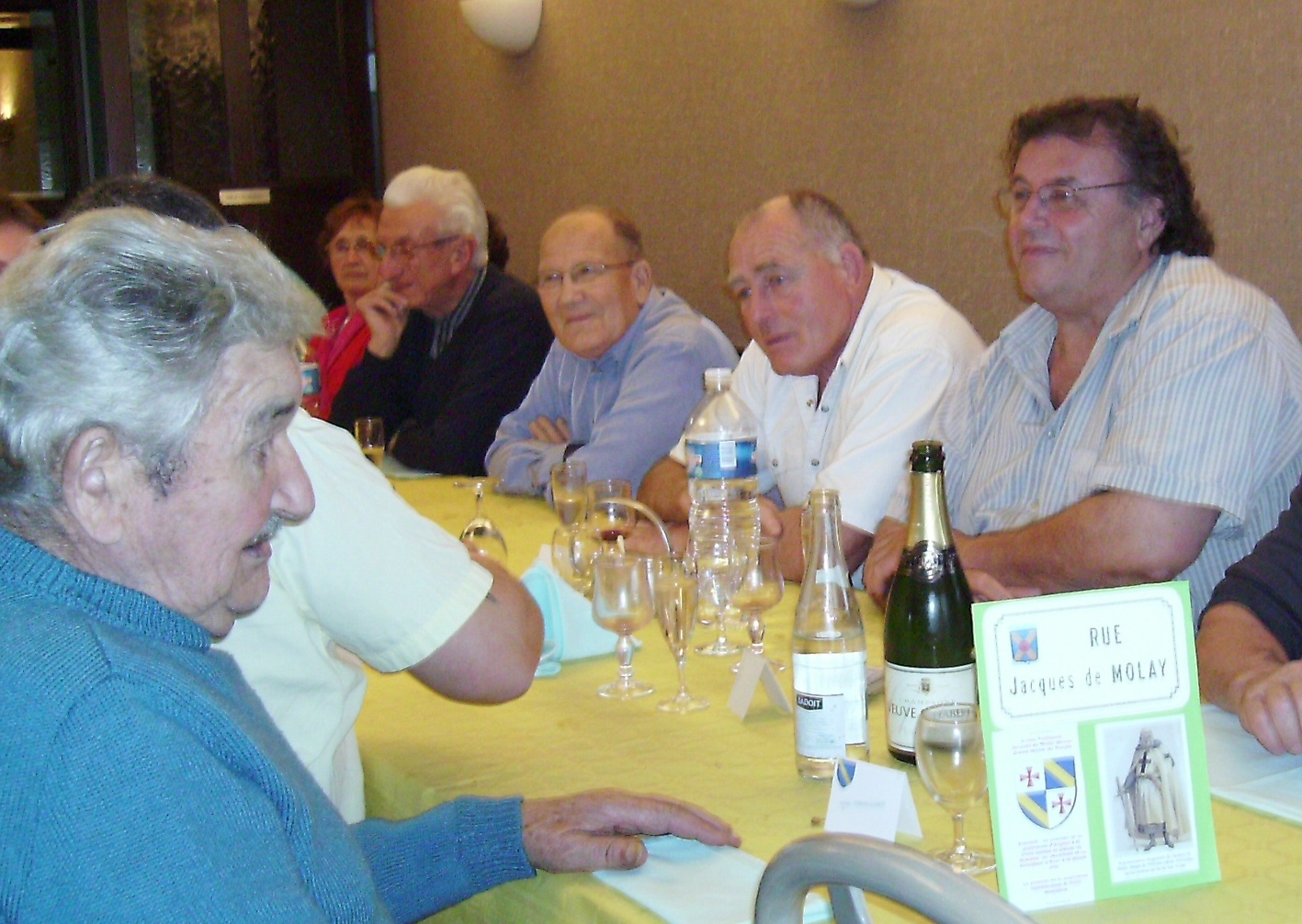
27/10/2007 dinner Jacques de Molay

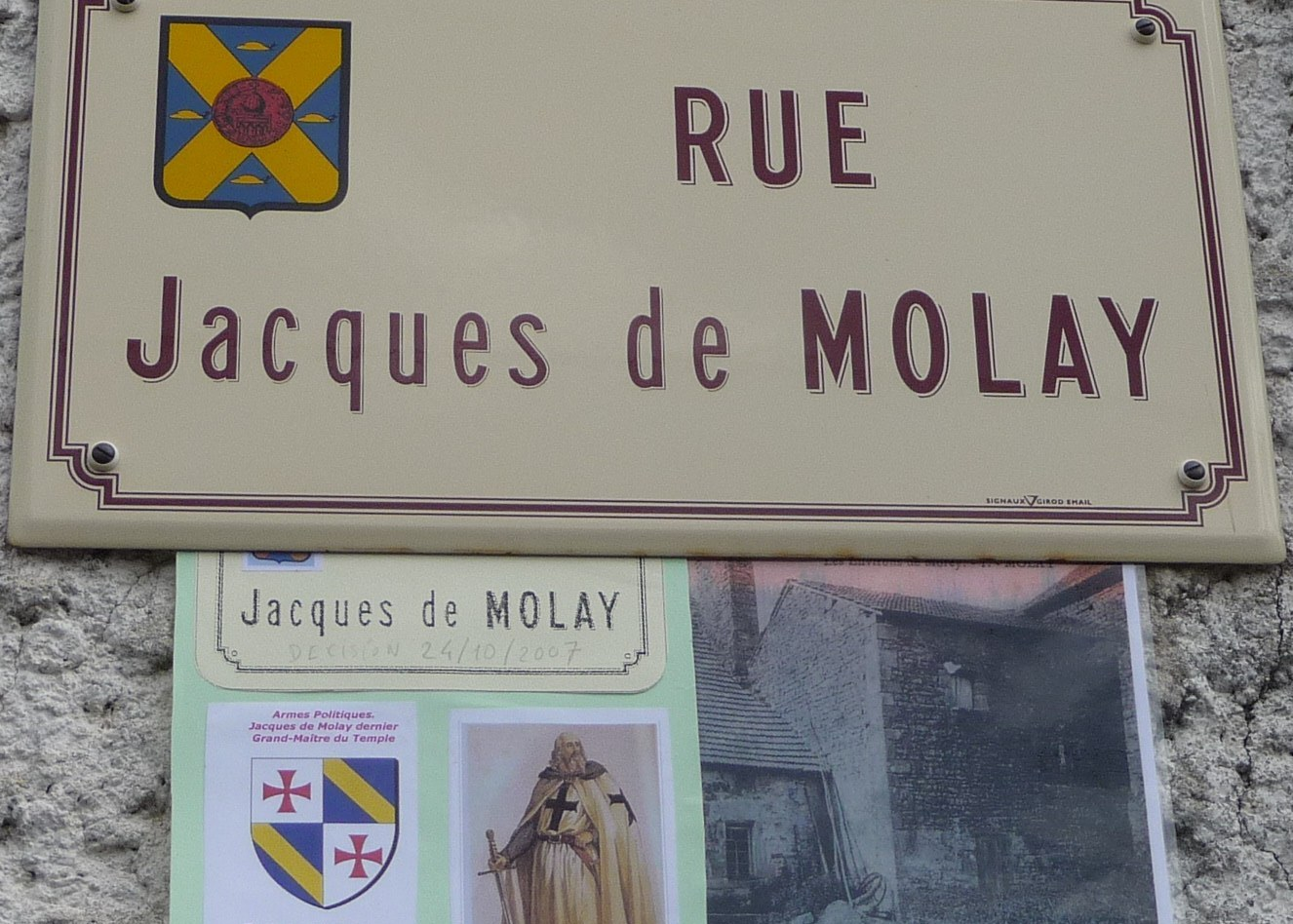
2007 Jacques de Molay Street

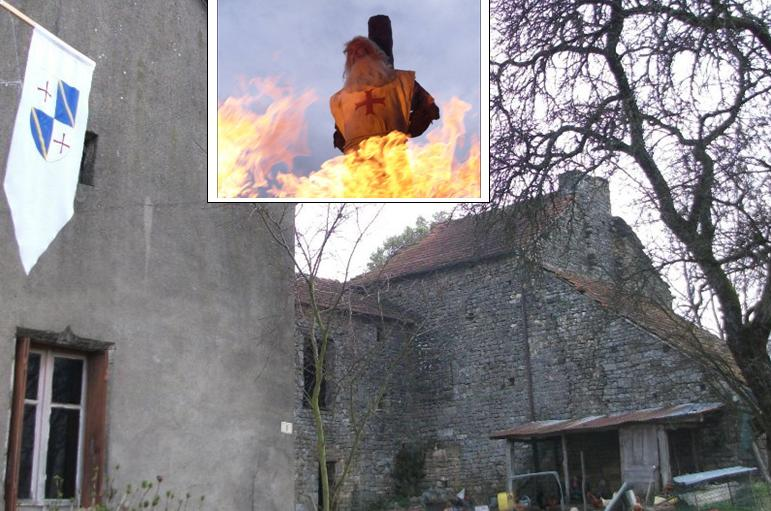
03/2014 memory Jacques de Molay

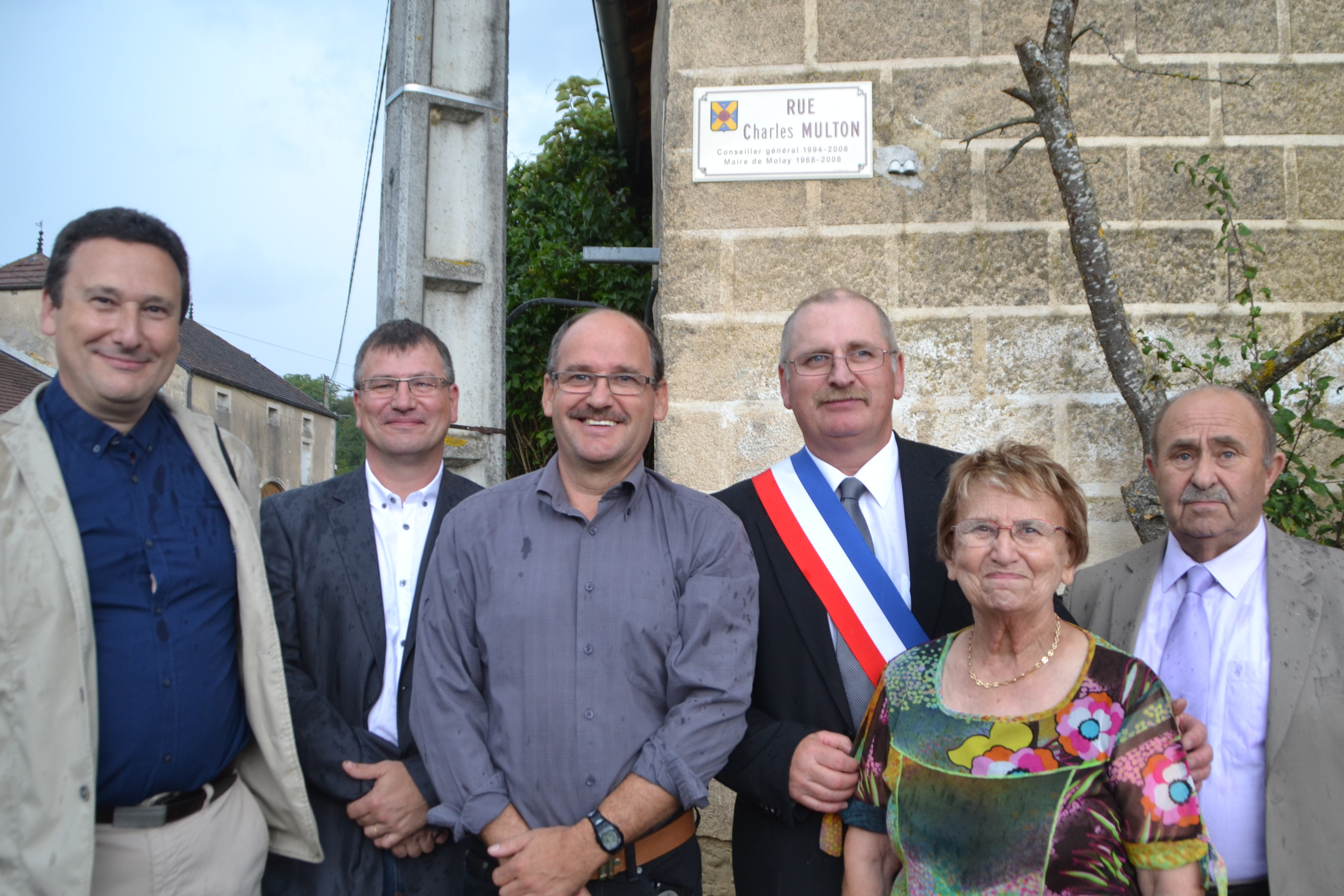
2/08/2014 Charles Multon Street
