= Jacques de Molay =

Grand Master of the Knights Templar

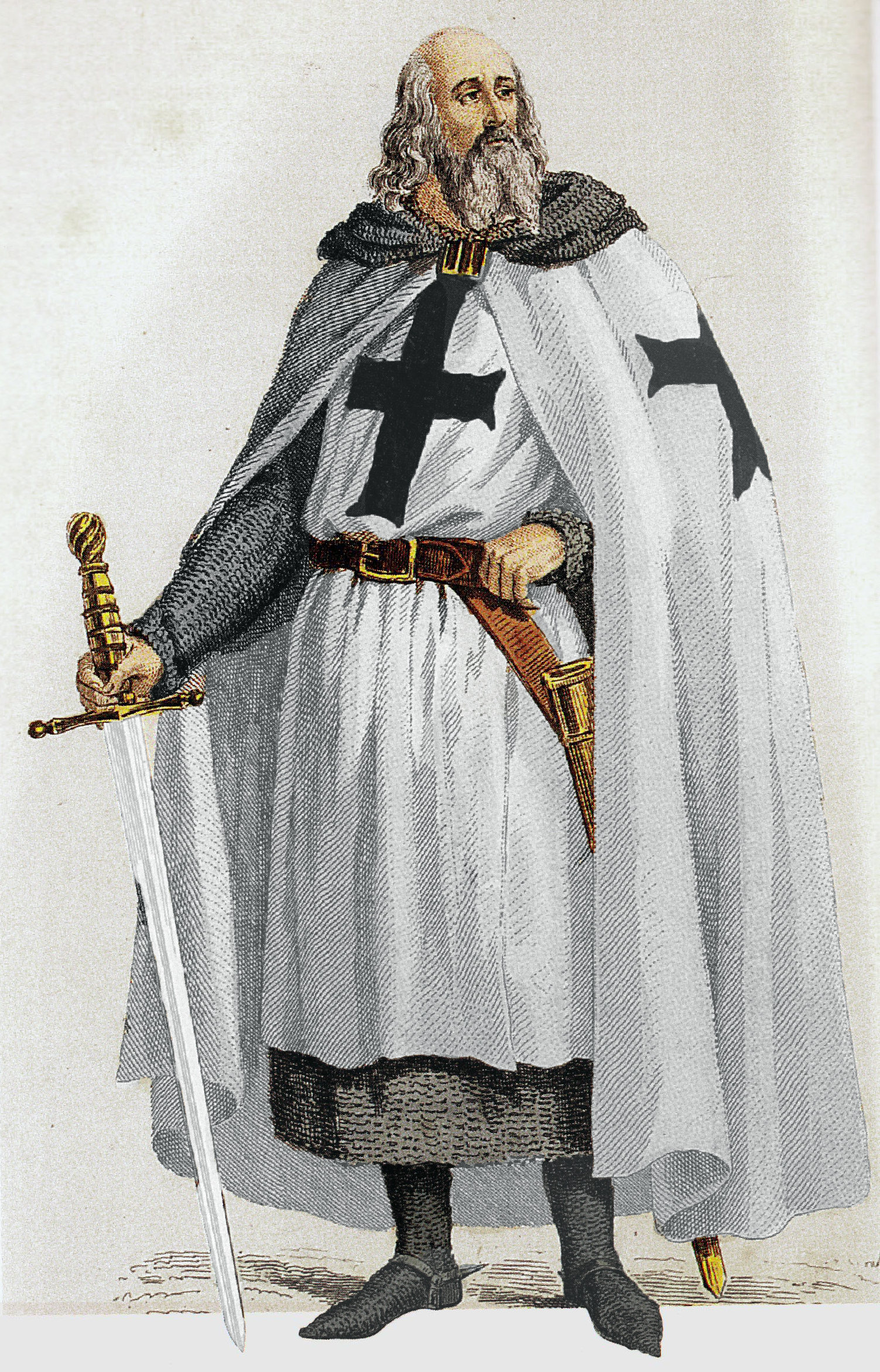

23rd Grand Master of the Knights Templar
- In office 1292–1312
- Monarch: King Philip IV
- Preceded by: Thibaud Gaudin
- Succeeded by: Order Disbanded

Personal details
- Born: c. 1240–1250 Molay, County of Burgundy
- Died: 11 or 18 March 1314 (aged c. 70) Paris, Kingdom of France

Military service
- Allegiance: Knights Templar
- Years of service: 1265–1314
- Rank: Grand Master (1292–1314)
- Battles/wars: Siege of Ruad

Coat of arms of Jacques de Molay

Jacques de Molay (French: [də mɔlɛ]; c. 1240–1250 – 11 or 18 March 1314), also spelled "Molai", was the 23rd and last grand master of the Knights Templar, leading the order sometime before 20 April 1292 until it was dissolved by order of Pope Clement V in 1312. Though little is known of his actual life and deeds except for his last years as Grand Master, he is one of the best known Templars.

Jacques de Molay's goal as grand master was to reform the order, and adjust it to the situation in the Holy Land during the waning days of the Crusades. As European support for the Crusades diminished, the French monarchy sought to disband the order and claim the wealth of the Templars as its own. King Philip IV of France, deeply in debt to the Templars, had Molay and many other French Templars arrested in 1307 and tortured into making false confessions. When Molay later retracted his confession, Philip had him burned upon a scaffold on an island in the River Seine in March, 1314. Both the sudden end of the centuries-old order of Templars and the dramatic execution of its last leader turned Molay into a legendary figure.

== Youth ==
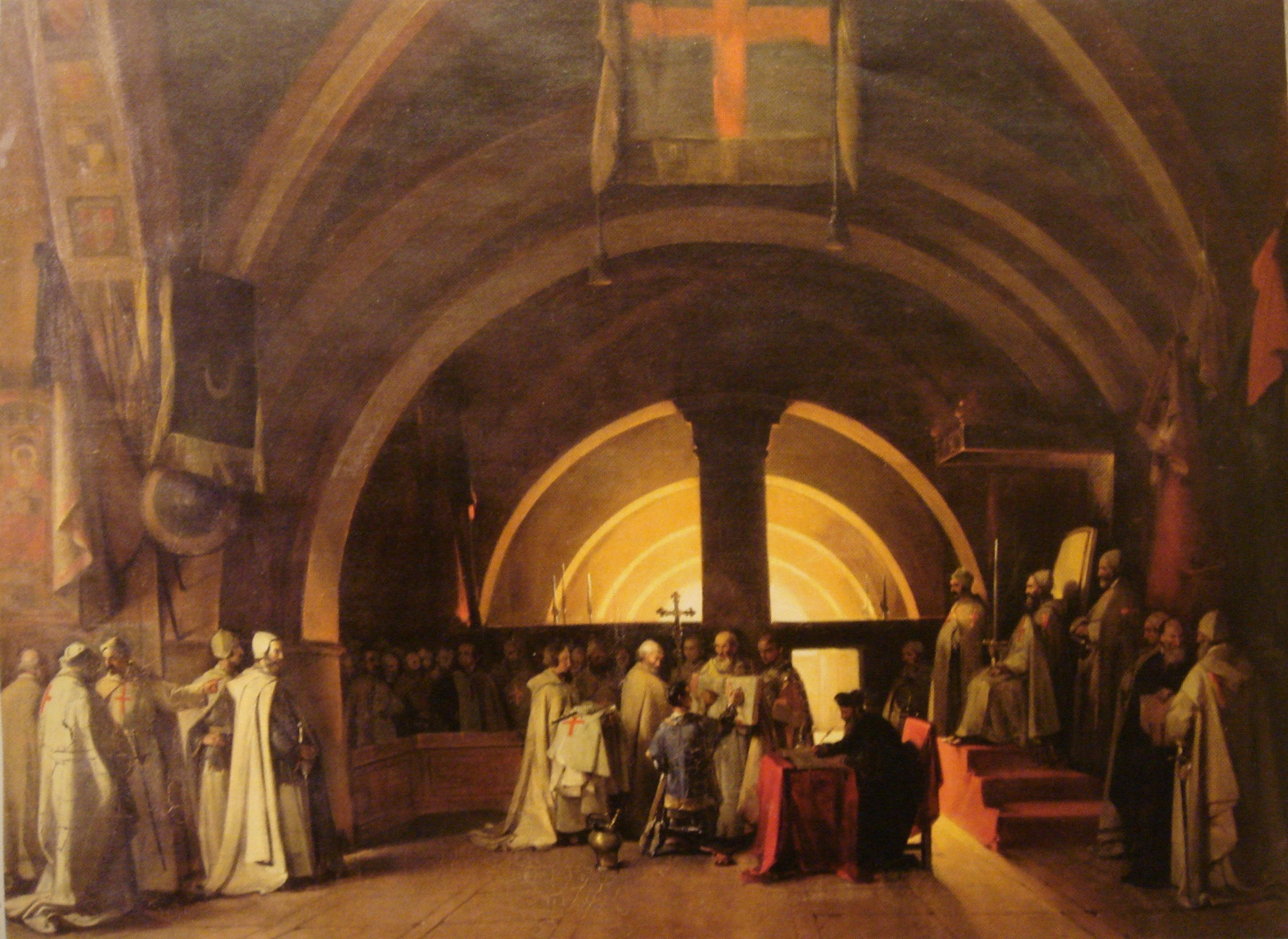
Ordination of Jacques de Molay in 1265 as a Knight Templar, at the Beaune commandery. Painting by Marius Granet (1777–1849).

Little is known of his early years, but Jacques de Molay was probably born in Molay, in the County of Burgundy, at the time a territory ruled by Otto III as part of the Holy Roman Empire, and in modern times in the department of Haute-Saône, eastern France. His birth year is not certain, but judging by statements made during the later trials, was probably around 1240–1250.

He was born into a family of minor or middle-ranking nobility. It is suggested that he was made a knight at age 21 in 1265 and is known that he was about 70 years of age at the time of his execution in 1314. His year of birth is not known and Alain Demurger finds it probable that he was born in the period 1244/45 to 1248/49 or even between 1240 and 1250.

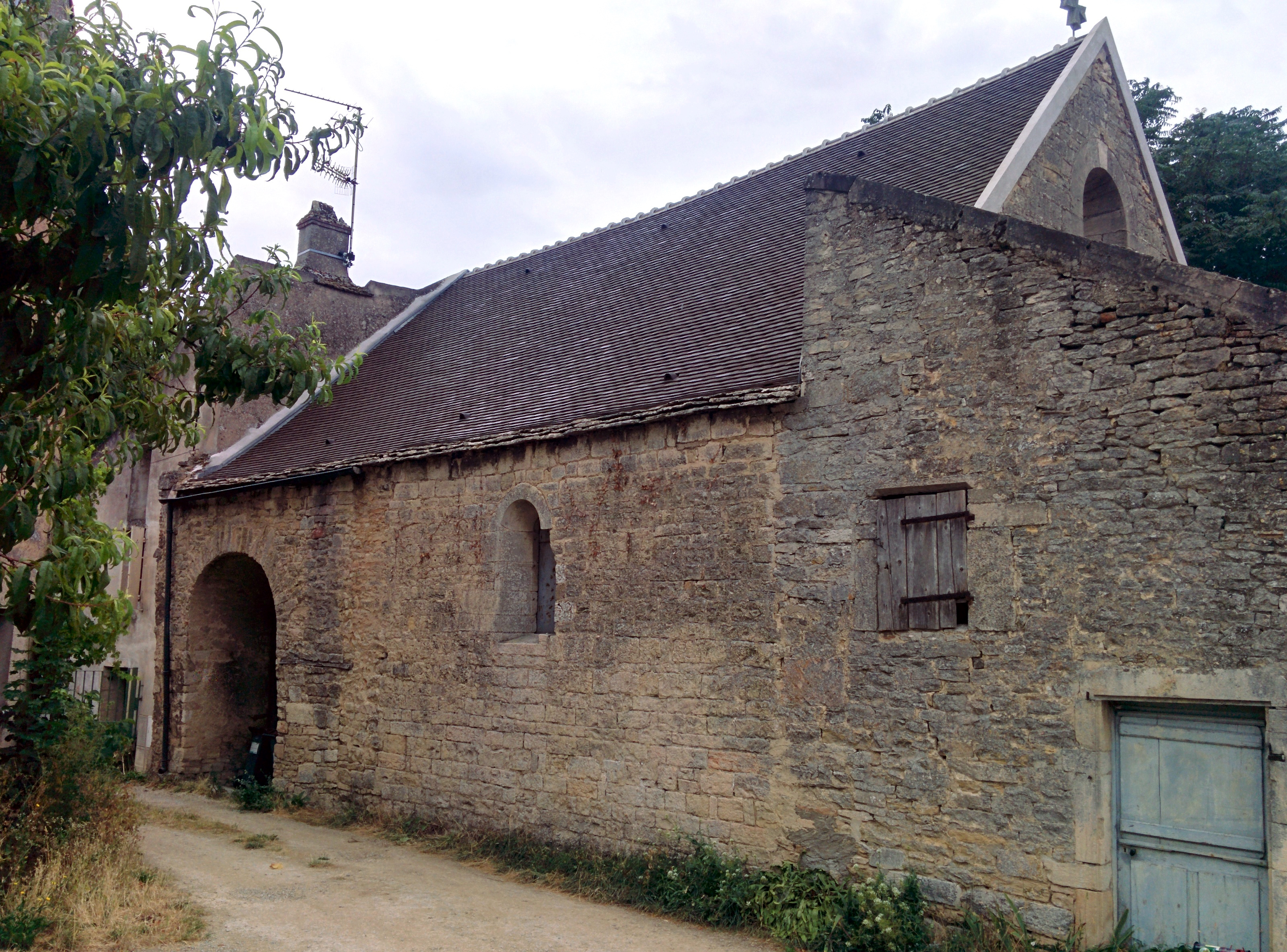
Chapel of the Beaune commandery, where Jacques de Molay was ordained.

In 1265 he was received into the Order of the Templars in a chapel at the Beaune House, by Humbert de Pairaud, the Visitor of France and England. Another prominent Templar in attendance was Amaury de la Roche, Templar Master of the province of France.

Around 1270, de Molay went to the East (Outremer), although little is recorded of his activities for the next twenty years.

== Grand master ==
After the Fall of Acre to the Egyptian Mamluks in 1291, the Franks (a name used in the Levant for Catholic Europeans) who were able to do so retreated to the island of Cyprus. It became the headquarters of the dwindling Kingdom of Jerusalem, and the base of operations for any future military attempts by the Crusaders against the Egyptian Mamluks, who for their part were systematically conquering any last Crusader strongholds on the mainland. Templars in Cyprus included Jacques de Molay and Thibaud Gaudin, their 22nd grand master. During a meeting assembled on the island in the autumn of 1291, Molay spoke of reforming the Order and put himself forward as an alternative to the current grand master. Gaudin died around 1292 and, because there were no other serious contenders for the role at the time, Molay was soon elected.

In spring 1293, he began a tour of the West to try to muster more support for a reconquest of the Holy Land. Developing relationships with European leaders such as Pope Boniface VIII, Edward I of England, James I of Aragon and Charles II of Naples, Molay's immediate goals were to strengthen the defence of Cyprus and rebuild the Templar forces. From his travels, he was able to secure authorization from some monarchs for the export of supplies to Cyprus, but could obtain no firm commitment for a new Crusade. There was talk of merging the Templars with one of the other military orders, the Knights Hospitaller. The grand masters of both orders opposed such a merger, but pressure increased from the Papacy.

It is known that Molay held two general meetings of his order in southern France, at Montpellier in 1293 and at Arles in 1296, where he tried to make reforms. In the autumn of 1296, Molay was back in Cyprus to defend his Order against the interests of King Henry II of Cyprus, a conflict which had its roots back in the days of Guillaume de Beaujeu.

From 1299 to 1303, Molay was engaged in planning and executing a new attack against the Mamluks. The plan was to coordinate actions between the Christian military orders, the King of Cyprus, the nobility of Cyprus, the forces of Cilician Armenia, and a new potential ally, the Mongols of the Ilkhanate (Persia), to oppose the Egyptian Mamluks and take back the coastal city of Tortosa in Syria.

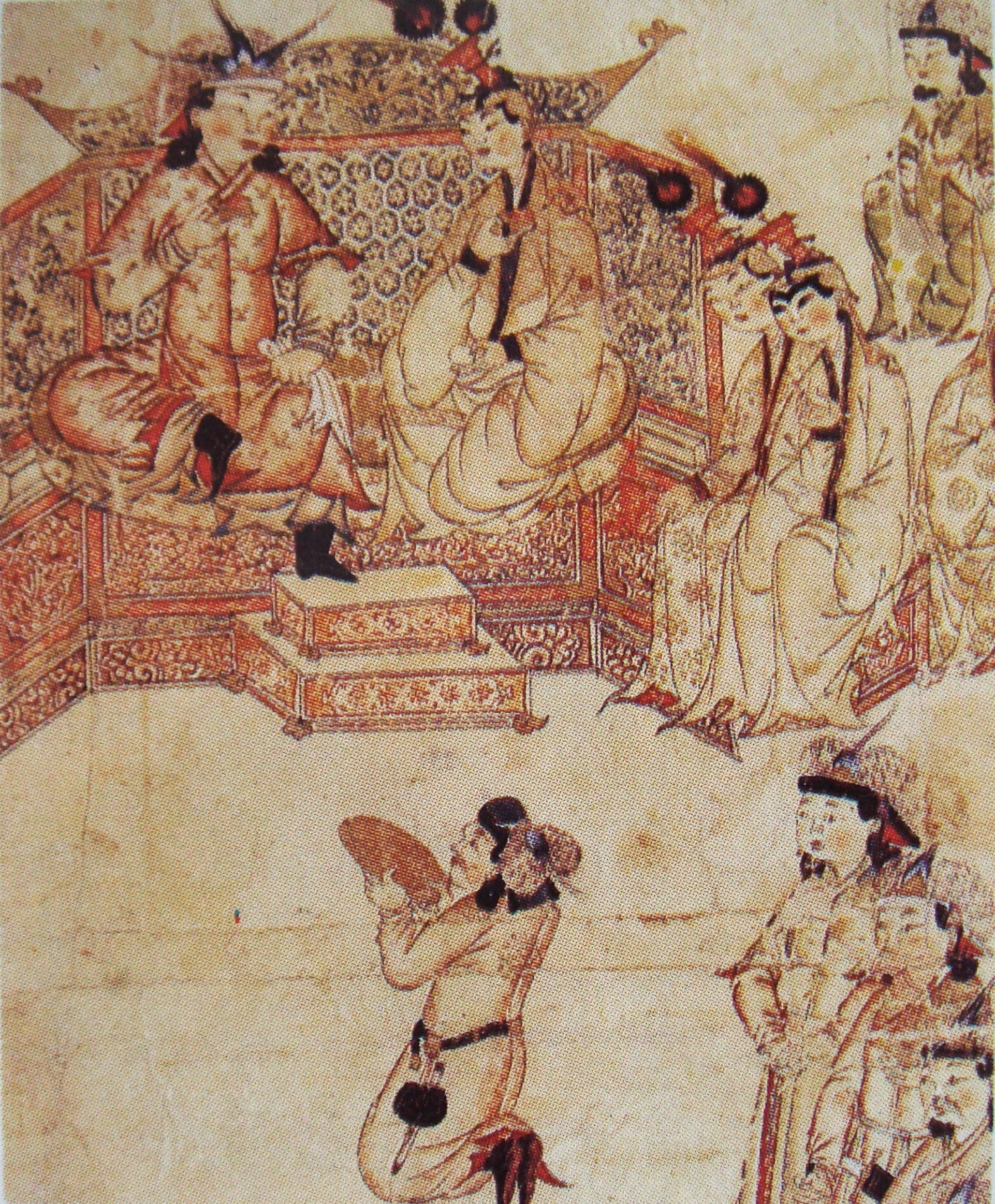
Ghazan, the Mongol ruler of the Ilkhanate, sought a Franco-Mongol alliance with the Crusaders against the Egyptian Mamluks, but was never able to successfully coordinate military actions

For generations, there had been communications between the Mongols and Europeans towards the possibility of forging a Franco-Mongol alliance against the Mamluks, but without success. The Mongols had been repeatedly attempting to conquer Syria themselves, each time either being forced back by the Egyptian Mamluks or having to retreat because of a civil war within the Mongol Empire, such as having to defend from attacks from the Mongol Golden Horde to the north. In 1299, the Ilkhanate again attempted to conquer Syria, having some preliminary success against the Mamluks in the Battle of Wadi al-Khazandar in December 1299.

In 1300, Molay and other forces from Cyprus put together a small fleet of sixteen ships which committed raids along the Egyptian and Syrian coasts. The force was commanded by King Henry II of Jerusalem, the king of Cyprus, accompanied by his brother, Amalric, Lord of Tyre, and the heads of the military orders, with the ambassador of the Mongol leader Ghazan also in attendance. The ships left Famagusta on 20 July 1300, and under the leadership of Admiral Baudouin de Picquigny, raided the coasts of Egypt and Syria: Rosetta, Alexandria, Acre, Tortosa and Maraclea, before returning to Cyprus.

The Cypriots then prepared for an attack on Tortosa in late 1300, sending a joint force to a staging area on the island of Ruad, from which raids were launched on the mainland. The intent was to establish a Templar bridgehead to await assistance from Ghazan's Mongols, but the Mongols failed to appear in 1300. The same happened in 1301 and 1302, and the island was finally lost in the Siege of Ruad on 26 September 1302, eliminating the Crusaders' last foothold near the mainland.

Following the loss of Ruad, Molay abandoned the tactic of small advance forces, and instead put his energies into trying to raise support for a new major Crusade, as well as strengthening Templar authority in Cyprus. When a power struggle erupted between King Henry II and his brother Amalric, the Templars supported Amalric, who took the crown and had his brother exiled in 1306. Meanwhile, pressure increased in Europe that the Templars should be merged with the other military orders, perhaps all placed under the authority of one king, and that individual should become the new King of Jerusalem when it was conquered.

=== Travel to France ===
In 1305, the newly elected Pope Clement V asked the leaders of the military orders for their opinions concerning a new crusade and the merging of their orders. Molay was asked to write memoranda on each of the issues, which he did during the summer of 1306. Molay was opposed to the merger, believing instead that having separate military orders was a stronger position, as the missions of each order were somewhat different. He was also of the belief that if there were to be a new crusade, it needed to be a large one because the smaller attempts were not effective.

On 6 June 1306, the leaders of both the Templars and the Hospitallers were officially asked to come to the Papal offices in Poitiers to discuss these matters, with the date of the meeting scheduled as All Saints Day (1 November) in 1306, though it later had to be postponed due to the Pope's illness with gastro-enteritis. Molay left Cyprus on 15 October 1306, arriving in France in late 1306 or early 1307; however, the meeting was again delayed until late May due to the Pope's illness.

King Philip IV of France, deeply in debt to the Templars, was in favor of merging the Orders under his own command, thereby making himself Rex Bellator, or War King. Molay, however, rejected the idea. Philip was already at odds with the papacy, trying to tax the clergy, and had been attempting to assert his own authority as higher than that of the Pope. For this, one of Clement's predecessors, Pope Boniface VIII, had attempted to have Philip excommunicated, but Philip then had Boniface abducted and charged with heresy. The elderly Boniface was rescued, but then died of shock shortly thereafter. His successor Pope Benedict XI did not last long, dying in less than a year, possibly poisoned via Philip's councillor Guillaume de Nogaret. It took a year to choose the next Pope, the Frenchman Clement V, who was also under strong pressure to bend to Philip's will. Clement moved the Papacy from Italy to Poitiers, France, where Philip continued to assert more dominance over the Papacy and the Templars.

The Grand Master of the Hospitallers, Fulk de Villaret, was also delayed in his travel to France because he was engaged with a battle at Rhodes. He did not arrive until late summer, so while waiting for his arrival, Molay met the Pope to discuss other matters, one of which was the charges by one or more ousted Templars who had made accusations of impropriety in the Templars' initiation ceremony. Molay had already spoken with the king in Paris on 24 June 1307 about the accusations against his order and was partially reassured. Returning to Poitiers, Molay asked the Pope to set up an inquiry to quickly clear the Order of the rumours and accusations surrounding it, and the Pope convened an inquiry on 24 August 1307.

== Arrest and charges ==
There were five initial charges lodged against the Templars. The first was renunciation of and spitting on the cross during initiation into the Order. The second was the stripping of the man to be initiated and the thrice kissing of that man by the preceptor on the navel, posterior and mouth. The third was telling the neophyte (novice) that unnatural lust was lawful and indulged in commonly. The fourth was that the cord worn by the neophyte day and night was consecrated by wrapping it around an idol in the form of a human head with a great beard (Baphomet), and that this idol was adored in all chapters. The fifth was that the priests of the order did not consecrate the host in celebrating Mass. Subsequently, the charges would be increased and would become, according to the procedures, lists of articles 86 to 127 to which will be added a few other charges, such as the prohibition to priests who do not belong to the order.

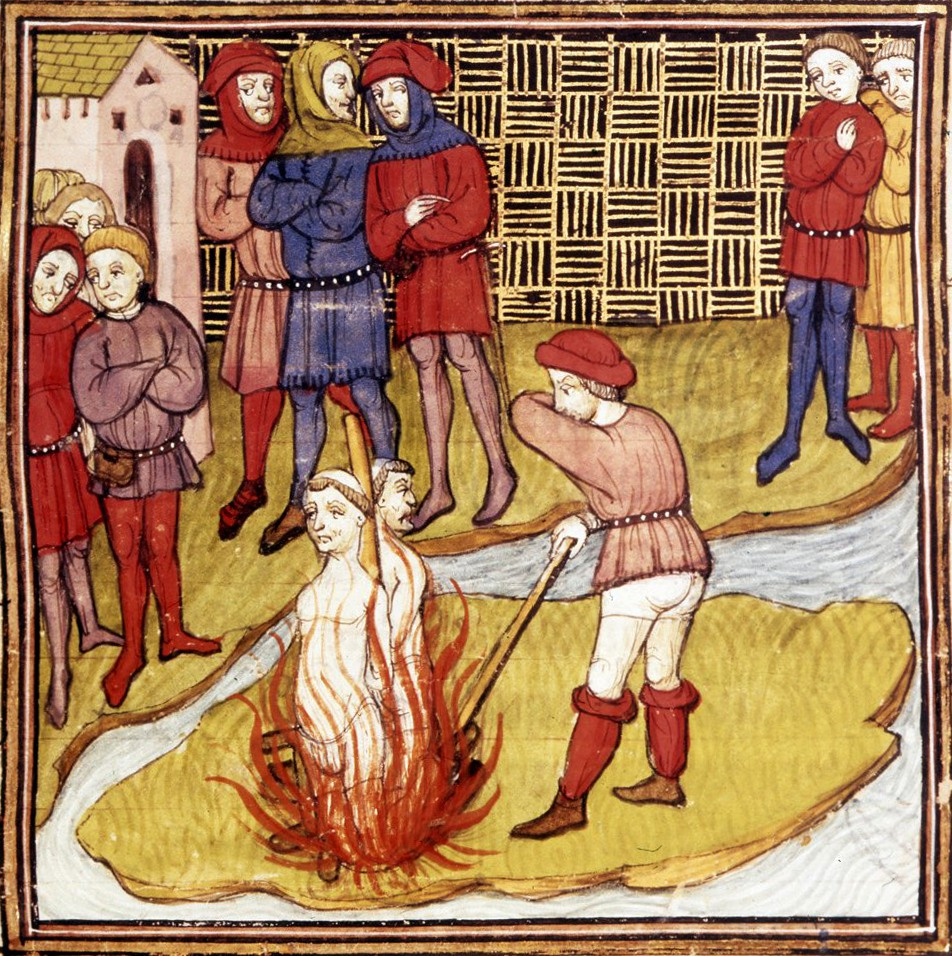
Jacques de Molay sentenced to the stake in 1314, from the Chronicle of France or of St Denis (fourteenth century). Note the shape of the island, representing the Île aux Juifs (Island of the Jews) in the Seine, where the executions took place.

Philip wanted the Templars arrested and their possessions confiscated to incorporate their wealth into the Royal Treasury and to be free of the enormous debt he owed the Templar Order. On 14 September, Philip took advantage of the rumors and inquiry to begin his move against the Templars, sending out a secret order to his agents in all parts of France to implement a mass arrest of all Templars at dawn on 13 October. Molay was in Paris on 12 October, where he was a pallbearer at the funeral of Catherine of Courtenay, wife of Count Charles of Valois, and sister-in-law of King Philip. In a dawn raid on Friday, 13 October 1307, Molay and all the Templars of the central house of Paris were arrested. Philip then had the Templars charged with heresy and many other trumped-up charges, most of which were identical to the charges which had previously been leveled by Philip's agents against Pope Boniface VIII.

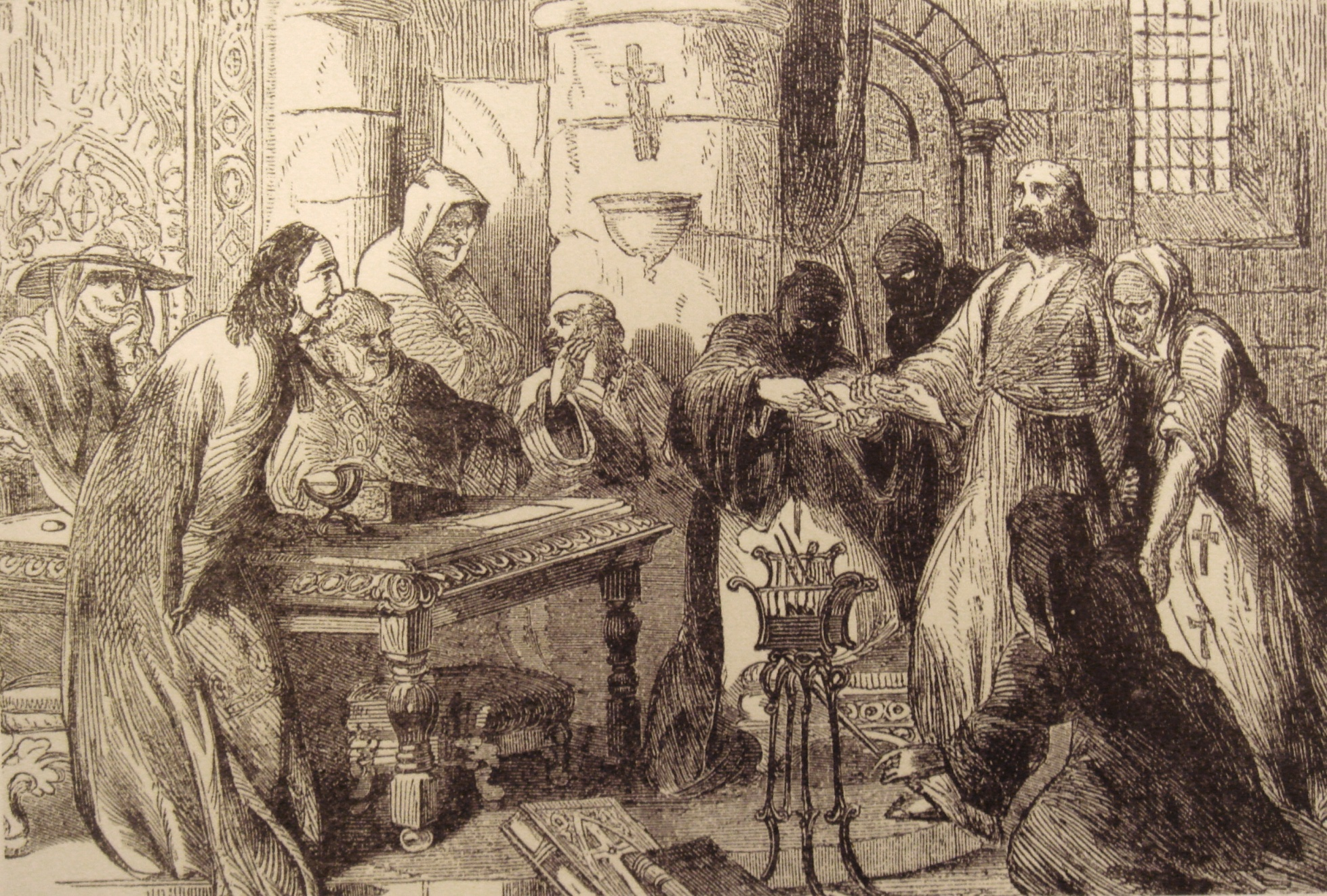
Interrogation of Jacques de Molay. 19th century print.

During forced interrogation by royal agents at the University of Paris on 24, and 25 October, Molay confessed that the Templar initiation ritual included "denying Christ and trampling on the Cross". He was also forced to write a letter asking every Templar to admit to these acts. Under pressure from Philip IV, Pope Clement V ordered the arrest of all the Templars throughout Christendom.

The Pope still wanted to hear Molay's side of the story, and dispatched two cardinals to Paris in December 1307. In front of the cardinals, Molay retracted his earlier confessions. A power struggle ensued between the king and the pope, which was settled in August 1308 when they agreed to split the convictions. Through the papal bull Faciens misericordiam, the procedure to prosecute the Templars was set out on a duality, whereby one commission would judge individuals of the Order and a different commission would judge the Order as a whole. Pope Clement called for an ecumenical council to meet in Vienne in 1310 to decide the future of the Templars. In the meantime, the Order's dignitaries, among them Molay, were to be judged by the pope.

In the royal palace at Chinon, Molay was again questioned by the cardinals, but this time with royal agents present, and he returned to his forced admissions made in 1307. In November 1309, the Papal Commission for the Kingdom of France began its own hearings, during which Molay again recanted, stating that he did not acknowledge the accusations brought against his order.

Any further opposition by the Templars was effectively broken when Philip used the previously forced confessions to sentence 54 Templars to be burnt at the stake between 10 May and 12 May 1310.

The council which had been called by the Pope for 1310 was delayed for a further two years due to the length of the trials, but was finally convened in 1312. On 22 March 1312, at the Council of Vienne, the Order of the Knights Templar was abolished by papal decree.

== Death ==
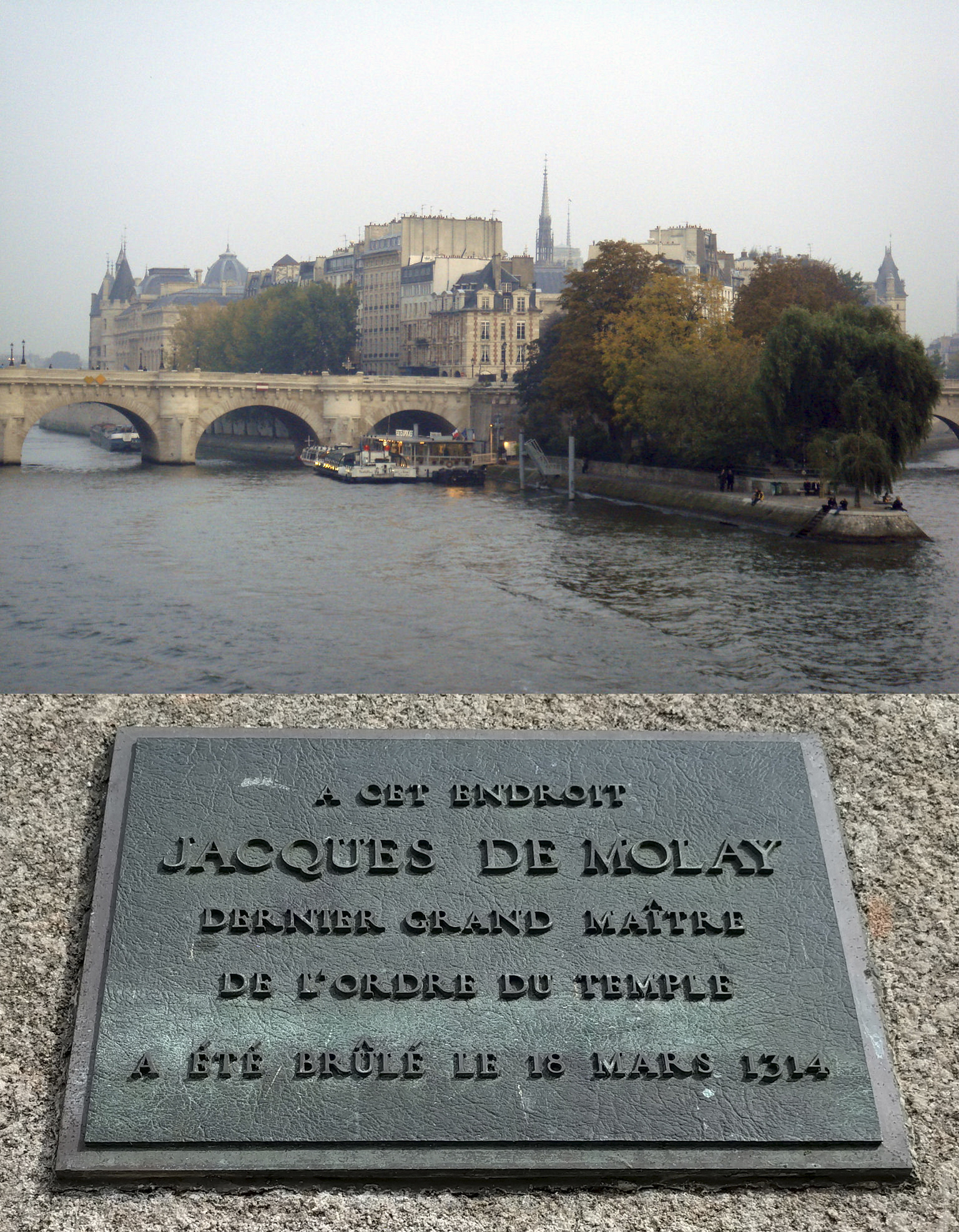
Marker at the site of Jacques de Molay's execution in Paris. (Translation: At this location, Jacques de Molay, last Grand Master of the Knights Templar, was burned on 18 March 1314), located by the stairs from the Pont-Neuf bridge. The top half of this photo shows the part of the island where the executions took place. The lower half shows the plaque, which is on one of the pillars of the bridge, behind the trees.

Molay was sentenced to death together with Geoffroi de Charney in 1314 as a direct result of cardinal legates' decisions and actions rather than being ordered by King Philip the Fair. He was burned at the stake on the Ile des Juifs in the Seine. According to Alain Demurger and others, the most probable date of the execution was 11 March 1314 although it is also quoted as 18 March 1314.

Of Molay's death, Henry Charles Lea gives this account:

"The cardinals dallied with their duty until 18 March 1314, when, on a scaffold in front of Notre Dame, Jacques de Molay, Templar Grand Master, Geoffroi de Charney, Master of Normandy, Hugues de Peraud, Visitor of France, and Godefroi de Gonneville, Master of Aquitaine, were brought forth from the jail in which for nearly seven years they had lain, to receive the sentence agreed upon by the cardinals, in conjunction with the Archbishop of Sens and some other prelates whom they had called in. Considering the offences which the culprits had confessed and confirmed, the penance imposed was in accordance with rule — that of perpetual imprisonment. The affair was supposed to be concluded when, to the dismay of the prelates and wonderment of the assembled crowd, Jacques de Molay and Geoffroi de Charney arose. They had been guilty, they said, not of the crimes imputed to them, but of basely betraying their Order to save their own lives. It was pure and holy; the charges were fictitious and the confessions false. Hastily the cardinals delivered them to the Prevot of Paris, and retired to deliberate on this unexpected contingency, but they were saved all trouble. When the news was carried to Philippe he was furious. A short consultation with his council only was required. The canons pronounced that a relapsed heretic was to be burned without a hearing; the facts were notorious and no formal judgment by the papal commission need be waited for. That same day, by sunset, a pyre was erected on a small island in the Seine, the Ile des Juifs, near the palace garden. There de Molay, de Charney, de Gonneville, and de Peraud were slowly burned to death, refusing all offers of pardon for retraction, and bearing their torment with a composure which won for them the reputation of martyrs among the people, who reverently collected their ashes as relics." (Note: the account varies by one day, not unusual for chronicles of the middle ages)

=== Chinon Parchment ===
In September 2001, Barbara Frale found a copy of the Chinon Parchment in the Vatican Secret Archives, a document which explicitly confirms that in 1308, Pope Clement V absolved Jacques de Molay and other leaders of the Order including Geoffroi de Charney and Hugues de Pairaud. She published her findings in the Journal of Medieval History in 2004. Another Chinon parchment dated 20 August 1308 addressed to Philip IV of France, well known to historians, stated that absolution had been granted to all those Templars that had confessed to heresy "and restored them to the Sacraments and to the unity of the Church".

== Legends ==
The sudden arrest of the Templars, the conflicting stories about confessions, and the dramatic deaths by burning, generated many stories and legends about both the Order, and its last Grand Master.

=== Conquest of Jerusalem ===
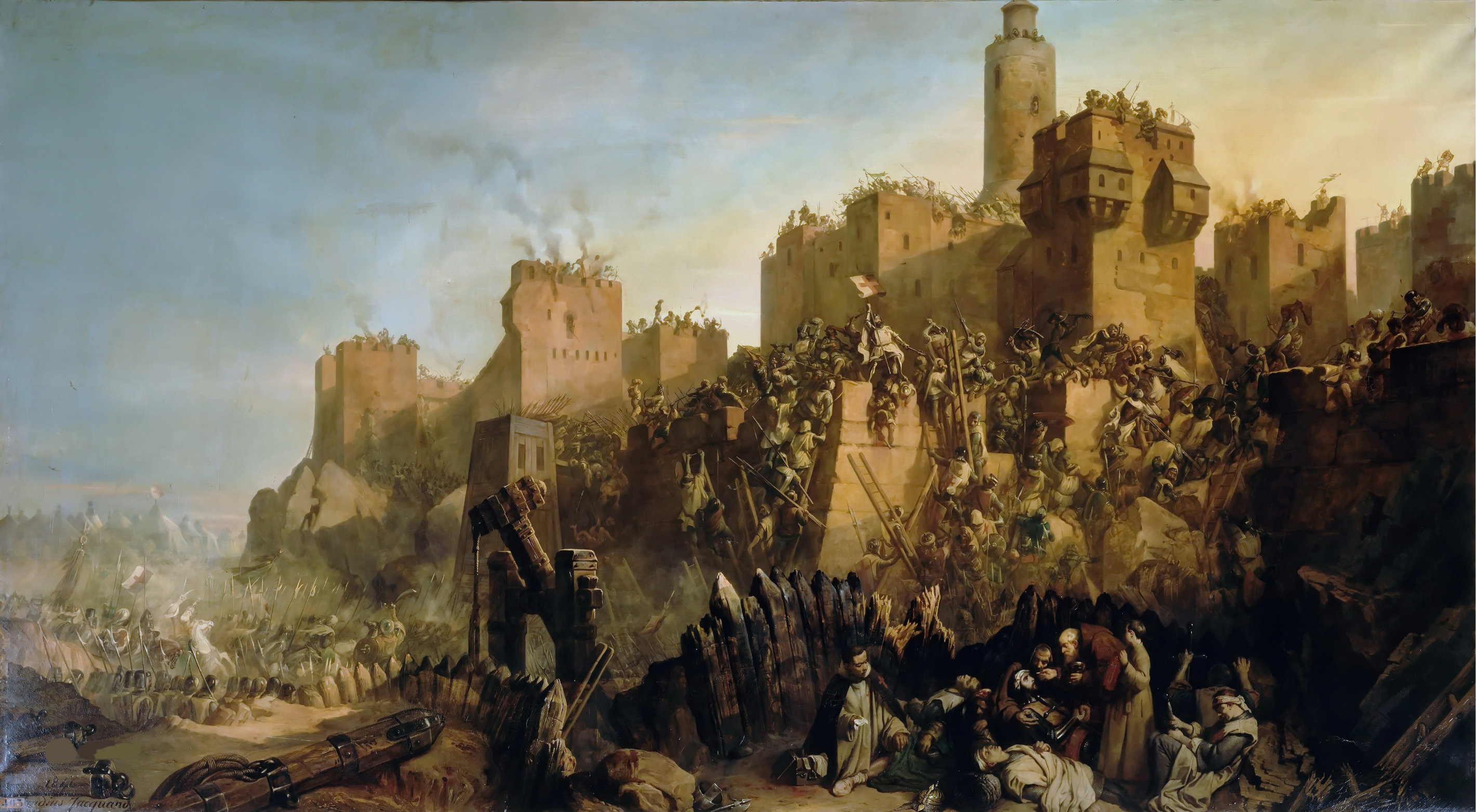
"The capture of Jerusalem by Jacques de Molay in 1299", by Claudius Jacquand, Versailles, Musée National Chateau et Trianons. This depiction was commissioned in the 1800s, but is about an event in 1299 that did not actually occur. There was no battle, and Molay was nowhere near Jerusalem at the time. In reality, after the Christians lost control of Jerusalem in 1244, it was not under Christian control again until 1917, when the British took it from the Ottomans.

In France in the 19th century, false stories circulated that Molay had captured Jerusalem in 1300. These rumors are probably related to the fact that the medieval historian the Templar of Tyre wrote about a Mongol general named "Mulay" who occupied Syria and Palestine for a few months in early 1300. The Mongol Mulay and the Templar Molay were entirely different people, but some historians regularly confused the two.

The confusion was enhanced in 1805, when the French playwright and historian François Raynouard made claims that Jerusalem had been captured by the Mongols, with Molay in command of one of the Mongol divisions. "In 1299, the Grand-Master was with his knights at the recapture of Jerusalem." This story of wishful thinking was so popular in France that in 1846 a large-scale painting was created by Claude Jacquand, titled Molay Prend Jerusalem, 1299 ("Molay Takes Jerusalem, 1299"), which depicts the supposed event. Today the painting hangs in the Hall of the Crusades in the French national museum of Versailles.

In the 1861 edition of the French encyclopedia, the Nouvelle Biographie Universelle, it even lists Molay as a Mongol commander in its "Molay" article:

Jacques de Molay was not inactive in this decision of the Great Khan. This is proven by the fact that Molay was in command of one of the wings of the Mongol army. With the troops under his control, he invaded Syria, participated in the first battle in which the Sultan was vanquished, pursued the routed Malik Nasir as far as the desert of Egypt: then, under the guidance of Kutluk, a Mongol general, he was able to take Jerusalem, among other cities, over the Muslims, and the Mongols entered to celebrate Easter.

— Nouvelle Biographie Universelle, "Molay" article, 1861.

Modern historians, however, state that there is no evidence to support such claims. There are indeed numerous ancient records of Mongol raids and occupations of Jerusalem (from Western, Armenian, or Arab sources), and in 1300 the Mongols did achieve a brief victory in Syria which caused a Muslim retreat, allowing the Mongols to launch raids into the Levant as far as Gaza for a period of a few months. During that year, rumors flew through Europe that the Mongols had recaptured Jerusalem and were going to return the city to the Europeans. However, this was only an urban legend, as the only activities that the Mongols had even engaged in were some minor raids through Palestine, which may or may not have even passed through Jerusalem itself. Regardless of what the Mongols may or may not have done, there is no evidence that Molay was ever a Mongol commander, and he probably never set foot in Jerusalem.

=== Curse ===
It has been claimed that Jacques de Molay cursed King Philip IV of France and his descendants from his execution pyre. However, the story of the shouted curse appears to be a combination of words by a different Templar and those of Molay. An eyewitness to the execution stated that Molay had shown no sign of fear and had told those present that God would avenge their deaths. Another variation on this story was told by the contemporary chronicler Ferreto of Vicenza, who applied the idea to a Neapolitan Templar brought before Clement V, whom he denounced for his injustice. Some time later, as he was about to be executed, he appealed "from this your heinous judgement to the living and true God, who is in Heaven", warning the Pope that, within a year and a day, he and Philip IV would be obliged to answer for their crimes in God's presence.

Philip and Clement V both died within a year of Molay's execution; Pope Clement succumbed to a long illness on 20 April 1314, and King Philip died due to a stroke while hunting. Then followed the rapid succession of the last Direct Capetian kings of France between 1314 and 1328, the three sons and a grandson of Philip IV. Within fourteen years of the death of Molay, the 300-year-old House of Capet collapsed. This series of events forms the basis of Les Rois maudits (The Accursed Kings), a series of historical novels written by Maurice Druon between 1955 and 1977, which was also adapted into two French television miniseries in 1972 and 2005.

The American historian Henry Charles Lea wrote: "Even in distant Germany Philippe's death was spoken of as a retribution for his destruction of the Templars, and Clement was described as shedding tears of remorse on his death-bed for three great crimes, the poisoning of Henry VII, Holy Roman Emperor, and the ruin of the Templars and Beguines".

=== Freemasonry ===
Some 400 years after the death of de Molay and the dissolution of the Knights Templar, the fraternal order of Freemasonry began to emerge in northern Europe. The Masons developed an elaborate mythos about their Order, and some claimed heritage from entities in history, ranging from the mystique of the Templars to the builders of Solomon's Temple. The stories of the Templars' secret initiation ceremonies also proved a tempting source for Masonic writers who were creating new works of pseudohistory. As described by modern historian Malcolm Barber in The New Knighthood: "It was during the 1760s that German masons introduced a specific Templar connection, claiming that the Order, through its occupation of the Temple of Solomon, had been the repository of secret wisdom and magical powers, which Jacques DeMolay had handed down to his successor before his execution and of which the eighteenth-century Freemasons were the direct heirs."

The modern Masonic Knights Templar is an international philanthropic and chivalric order affiliated with Freemasonry, and begun in Ireland perhaps as long ago as 1780. Unlike the initial degrees conferred in a Masonic Lodge, which only require a belief in a Supreme Being regardless of religious affiliation, the Knights Templar is one of several additional Masonic Orders in which membership is open only to Freemasons who profess a belief in the Christian religion. The full title of this Order is The United Religious, Military and Masonic Orders of the Temple and of St John of Jerusalem, Palestine, Rhodes and Malta.

The story of de Molay's brave defiance of his inquisitors has been incorporated in various forms into Masonic lore; most notably in the form of a youth group for young men aged 12 to 21, sponsored by Freemasonry, and named after the last Grand Master of the Knights Templar. DeMolay International, also known as "The Order of DeMolay", was founded in Kansas City in 1919 by Freemason Frank S. Land. Similar to what happens in Freemasonry, new members are ceremoniously initiated using "degrees" that are part of the Order's secret ritual, authored, in the case of the Order of DeMolay's ritual, by Frank A. Marshall at founder Land's request in 1919. The first, and less dramatic, of the two degrees is called "the Initiatory Degree", wherein initiates are escorted around the meeting room and instructed in the precepts and Seven Cardinal Virtues of the Order. The second of the two degrees, known as "the DeMolay Degree", which, along with the Initiatory Degree, members and observers are sworn to keep secret, dramatically recreates the trial, "before a Commission in its Council Chamber", of the historic characters named in the ritual as "Jacques DeMolay and his three preceptors, Geoffrey de Charney, Godfrey de Goneville, and Hughes de Peralde." The DeMolay Degree, in which players dress in robes and other period costume, and appear on a dimly-lit stage whereupon they dramatically deliver memorized lines prescribed in the ritual, is described therein as depicting "the tragic climax in the career of Jacques DeMolay, the hero and martyr who is the exemplar of our Order." The stage instructions include that "[t]he foremost point to be remembered is to portray Jacques DeMolay as the hero and to select an interpretation for the DeMolay Degree which will enhance the lessons of fidelity and toleration." The drama concludes with the commission condemning the four to life imprisonment; however, according to the ritual, "so incensed was the king at the noble defiance and defense of DeMolay and Geoffroi de Charney that he overrode the Commission's verdict and hurried DeMolay and de Charney to the stake on an island near the Cathedral, where they were barbarously burned."

== Sources ==
- Barber, Malcolm (1994). The New Knighthood: A History of the Order of the Temple. Cambridge: Cambridge University Press. ISBN 978-0-521-42041-9.
- Barber, Malcolm (2006). The Trial of the Templars (2nd ed.). Cambridge University Press. ISBN 978-0-521-67236-8.
- "Jacques de Molay". The Catholic Encyclopedia.
- Demurger, Alain (2004). The Last Templar – The Tragedy of Jacques de Molay, Last Grand Master of the Temple (Translated into English by Antonia Nevill), Profile Books LTD, ISBN 1-86197-529-5 (First publication in France in 2002 as Jacques de Molay: le crépuscule des templiers by Éditions Payot & Rivages).
- Frale, Barbara (2009), The Templars – The secret history revealed, Maverick House Publishers, ISBN 978-1-905379-60-6.
- Lea, Henry Charles (1887). "Chapter V. Political Heresy Utilized by the State". A History of the Inquisition of the Middle Ages. Vol. III. New York: Harper & Brothers. pp. 238–333.
- Martin, Sean (2005). The Knights Templar: The History & Myths of the Legendary Military Order. New York): Thunder's Mouth Press. ISBN 978-1-56025-645-8.
- Nicholson, Helen (2001). The Knights Templar: A New History. Stroud: Sutton. ISBN 978-0-7509-2517-4.
- Ralls, Karen (2012). The Templars and the Grail: Knights of the Quest. Quest Books. ISBN 978-0835630115.
- Read, Piers (2001). The Templars. New York: Da Capo Press. ISBN 978-0-306-81071-8.
- Schein, Sylvia (October 1979). "Gesta Dei per Mongolos 1300. The Genesis of a Non-Event". The English Historical Review. 94 (373): 805–819. doi:10.1093/ehr/XCIV.CCCLXXIII.805. JSTOR 565554.

Preceded by Thibaud Gaudin	Grand Master of the Knights Templar; 1292–1312	Succeeded by Order abolished
