= Hugues de Pairaud =

Knights Templar

Hugues de Pairaud (also Perraud, Peraudo, Peraut or Desperaut) was one of the leaders of the Knights Templar. He and Godefroi de Gonneville (the Preceptor of Aquitaine) were sentenced to life imprisonment on March 18, 1314. They were spared the fate of Jacques de Molay (Grand Master) and Geoffroi de Charney (Preceptor of Normandy), who were both burned at the stake, because they accepted their sentence in silence.

In 1297 de Pairaud contested the election of Jacques de Molay as grand master.

In 1304 Pairaud supported Philip IV of France against Boniface VIII.

== The charges ==
The charges brought against Hugues de Pairaud are similar to those brought against all the others during the Knights Templar Trial. Pairaud was implicated in the worship of false idols by Raoul de Gizy, who claimed to have seen a mysterious head in seven Templar houses, some of them held by Hugues de Pairaud. Pairaud was accused of taking Jean de Cugy "behind an altar and kissing him on the base of the spine and the navel." De Cugy also claimed that Pairaud had threatened him with life imprisonment if he did not deny Christ and spit on a cross, and that Pairaud had told him that it was permissible for brothers to have sexual intercourse with other brothers (sodomy).

== In fiction ==
The persecution of the Templars (with Pairaud and Gonneville as supporting characters) is featured in Le Roi de fer, the 1955 first installment of Les Rois maudits (The Accursed Kings), a series of historical novels written by Maurice Druon between 1955 and 1977. The novels were also adapted into two French television miniseries in 1972 and 2005.
