= Notre-Dame de Nantilly Church =

Church in Maine-et-Loire, France

Coordinates: 47.2532°N 0.0765°W

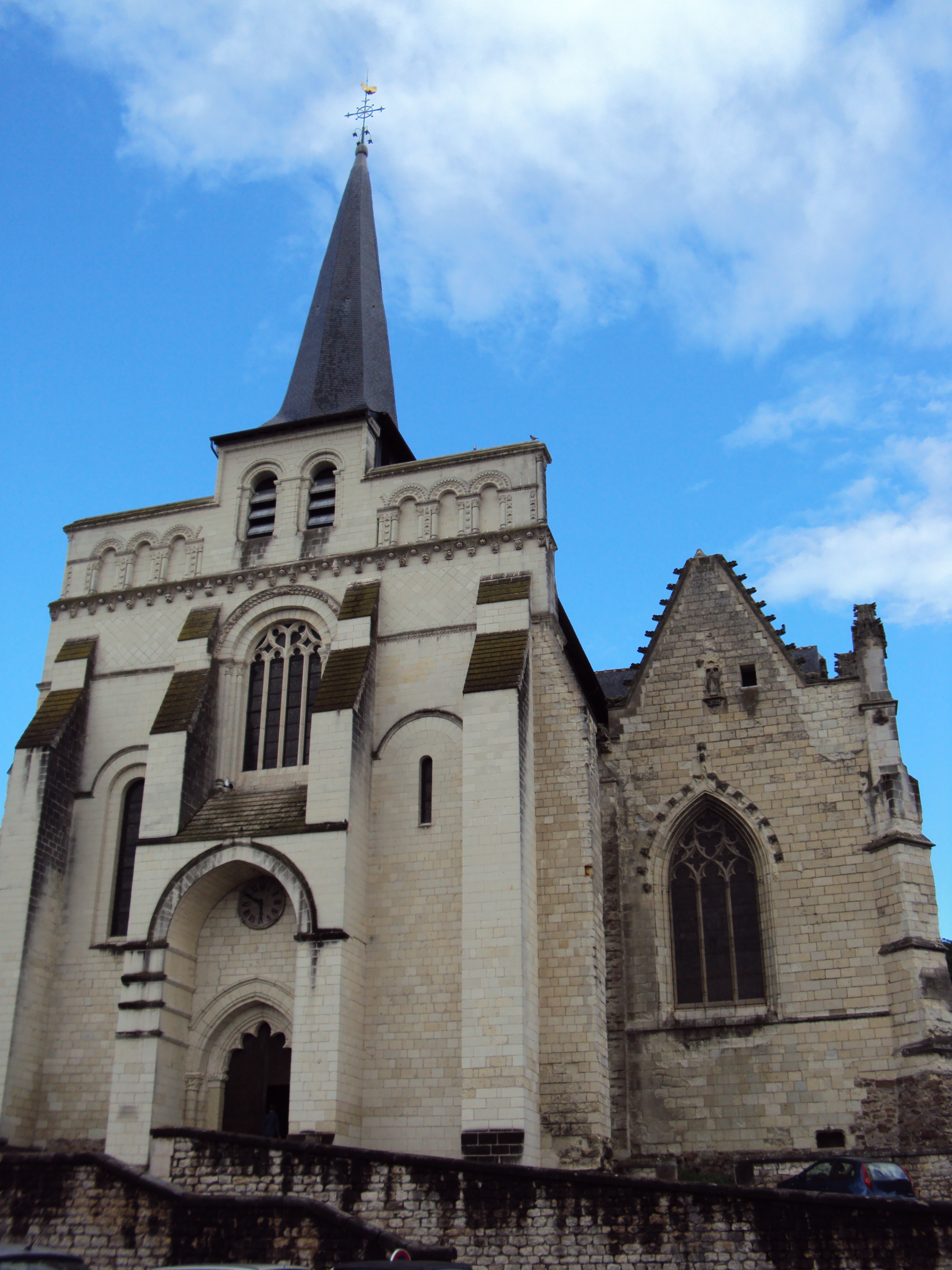

Notre-Dame-de-Nantilly Church is a Roman Catholic church in Saumur, France. It was made a monument historique in 1840. To the right of the choir is the statue of Notre-Dame-de-Nantilly.

== History ==
The site is first mentioned as an annexe to a Gallo-Roman villa in a diploma of Charles the Bald. The history of the Abbey of Saint-Florent mentions the parish of Santa Maria de Lentimiaco, specifically when Absalon brought Florentius of Anjou's relics to the town. A 1003 papal bull of pope John XVII, sent to abbot Robert, mentions the "fiscus Lentiniacus" with the "church of St Mary and chapels of Saint Hilarius and Saint Vincent" as abbey lands. Other 12th century bulls in the Codex Rubeus mention the same lands. The oldest part of the church is the Romanesque nave built by William VIII of Aquitaine, count of Poitiers, probably in 1120 and definitely after the great fire of Saumur in 1067. This makes it the oldest church in the town

A bull of pope Urban IV dated 28 January 1263 took the church and priory of Nantilly from the abbey to establish two canons there, but this bull was never acted upon. Urban's successor pope Clement IV gave full possession of the priory back to the abbey. After his death at Dinant on 23 April 1266, Gilles of Saumur, archbishop of Tyr, was buried in the choir of the church - his tomb was rediscovered and opened on 2 December 1614, closed, rediscovered again in May 1699, and finally desecrated during the French Revolution - all that survives from it is his crozier.

Louis XI pierced the south exterior wall of the existing nave to add a parish church on that side and also rebuilt the transept. The oratory acted as a baptismal chapel. A 1699 memoir by Thomas Hue de Miromesnil, intendant of the généralité de Tours, showed that the church was served by ten Oratorian priests.

In 1793 it was used to imprison Vendéan prisoners and two years later an Altar of the Fatherland was erected in the middle of the choir. In 1851 it was restored to designs by Charles Joly-Leterme, then in 1893-1909 to designs by Lucien Magne, and finally in 1996-1998 by Gabor Mester de Parajd, chief architect of 'monuments historiques'.

== Description ==
=== Nave ===
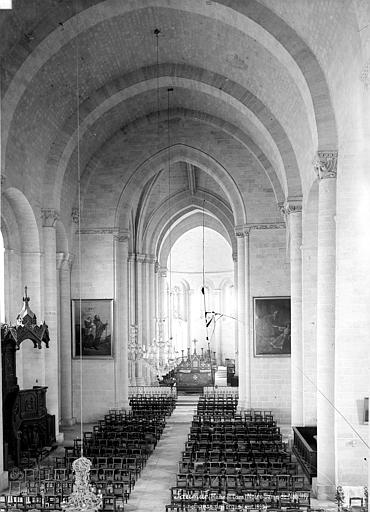
Nave.

The oldest part of the Romanesque church is the single six-bayed nave with a large transept opening onto two apsidal chapels and a deep two-bay choir ending in a semicircle. The church's plan looks like a trident, a common arrangement in the Loire valley. The façade is 13 metres wide, vaulted with a very thick broken vault with masonry in local tuffeau stone.

The ten protruding pillars of the nave each have a radius of 0.9m. Against them are set half-columns topped by ten beautiful capitals, all by the same sculptor and grouped into three themes:

- patterns of knotted intertwined stems ending in stylised palmettes - on all the columns along the north side except the capital on the second column
- monsters - on the second capital on the north side are human-headed griffins facing each other, with their heads in the corners of the basket; human-headed griffins, griffins and lionesses on the first two capitals on the south side and on the capital of the fifth column.
- the two powers held by an abbot, namely spiritual power (an abbot officiating at a mass with raised hands and two acolytes handing him wine and water, then to his right a lawyer holding the abbatial tau which touches a person) and the temporal power (a lord piercing a dragon with a sword, followed by a falconer) - third and fourth columns on the south side, facing the north door, used by the laity.

They are very close to the style of those at Notre-Dame church in Cunault.

The pillars support the arcades above the windows, which rise to the springing of the nave's transverse arches on the capitals. The pillars and arcades are set against the side wall. Each window is separated from the arcade by a reticulated archivolt, leftover from the 11th century decorative style of the 11th century. The walls are divided into two equal parts by the level of the windows and the lower level of the walls.

The nave foreshadows Angevin Gothic in the severity of its exterior features. Only the north facade has retained its original structure with tufa walls. The interior buttresses and supports are 4.50 m thick, the same thickness as those in Le Ronceray abbey in Angers and Notre-Dame du Ronceray church in Poitiers. The nave's west front is supported by four buttresses and was extensively restored by Magne.

In 1850, the architect Joly-Leterme reported the church's worrying condition. Work began in 1851, including rebuilding the nave columns, consolidating the vault, restoring the capitals, and whitewashing the walls.

=== Transept ===
The transept crossing and the choir shows architectural features which show they post-date the nave.

Marcel Aubert noted that at Notre-Dame de Nantilly and at Saint-Pierre-du-Marais church in Saumur the master builder intended - with the crossing vault - to combine the dome with a ribbed vault reinforced by liernes, forming a ribbed dome. The eight ribs converge around a central oculus. This type of vault appeared in Anjou between 1160 and 1200, such as around 1170 at the church of Saint-Pierre-du-Marais, and required the crossing to be supported by four double-roll arches with a "doubleau angevin" moulding (i.e. emphasised by thin tori). The upper archivolt of each double-arch rests on a pilaster flanked by a corner column and the lower archivolt rests on a large column. The supporting columns and bases were rebuilt at the end of the 14th or start of the 15th century, perhaps following the collapse of the bell tower at the crossing. The capitals are 19th-century copies in the style of those at Angers Cathedral.

A vaulted apsidal chapel with a semi-dome forming the south arm of the transept and the semicircular arched window in the west wall of the north arm are both original. The large north and south windows, the columns in the external corners, their capitals, the moulding of the ogives, and the rosettes of the keystones are all from the end of the 14th or the start of the 15th century.

=== Choir ===
The choir and apse both date to 1150-1200. They seem to have been built after the nave and before the transept crossing. The column capitals in the apse are close in style to those in the nave, with the latter dating to the 1140s. The choir has a barrel vault and the apse is lit by five semi-circular-topped windows and vaulted with a semi-dome.

=== South side ===
After the birth of the future Charles VIII of France, his father Louis XI envisaged establishing a college of canons in the church. To that purpose he built a vast side aisle to the south of the church for the parishoners, whilst the canons would get the nave. The new aisle was decorated with five remarkable keystones:

1. an armoured Michael the Archangel killing a demon, encircled by the collar of the new Order of Saint Michael
2. the coats of arms of Charles and his mother Charlotte of Savoy
3. the coats of arms of France and Savoy
4. the coats of arms of France and of the Dauphiné
5. the letters JHS

In the first bay is a small oratory in Flamboyant Gothic style, which according to tradition was reserved for Louis XI. It now houses a baptismal font.

=== Underground chapel ===
The entrance to the 38-step staircase leading to the subterranean chapel is at the entrance to the south aisle. The chapel is around 16 square metres in size. It has a 13th century vaulted roof is eight metres high. Its original use is unknown, but may have been as a mortuary chapel. It was converted into an ossuary between the 17th and 19th centuries, until the cemetery was suppressed.

== Organ ==
It was made between 1685 and 1690 by Breton organ-maker Pierre Le Hellocq (or Helloco). Little is known on Le Hellocq's life. He probably began his career in Britanny then Anjou. He travelled to Vannes and made the organ for Notre-Dame-du-Roncier church in Josselin. He seems to have been present in Nantes between 1684 and 1695 - his son died there in 1684 and he signed a marriage register there in 1695.

It has retained its 1690 case supported by atlases and almost all of its original instrumental structure, though it was badly damaged during the Revolution. It was restored in 1847 by Louis Bonn, an organ-maker from Tours, who removed the Baroque stops and added a third manual. It then received no maintenance for a century before being restored again by the organ-maker Nicolas Toussaint from the Manufacture Bretonne d’Orgues, based in Nantes, and reinaugurated on 26 November 2016. After that restoration it has 2166 pipes and 33 stops distributed between three manuals and a pedalboard.

== Stained glass windows ==
These date between the end of the 19th and the start of the 20th century. The three in the apse and apsidal chapels were made in 1862 by the Lobin studio in Tours and show the Madonna and Child flanked by the Virgin Mary receiving the Holy Spirit and the coronation of the Virgin. The stained glass in the north apsidal chapel showing scenes from the life of saint Joseph was installed in 1869, whilst that in the south apsidal chapel shows the Nativity, the Crucifixion and the Coronation of the Virgin.

The stained glass in the south arm of the transept shows the Assumption of Mary and was made in 1903 by the Parisian studio of Marcel Delon (a pupil of Eugène-Stanislas Oudinot who had set up the studio after Oudinot's death in 1889) and of Luc-Olivier Merson. The cartoon was by Henri-Marcel Magne, son of Lucien Magne, who restored the south side. It refers to the Confraternity of Notre-Dame-de-la-Mi-Aoust, recalling an ancient pilgrimage devoted to the Virgin Mary.

On the west front of the south aisle is a large stained glass window showing Our Lady of the Rosary, dating to 1899 and created by Charles-Ambroise Leprévost from a cartoon by Marcel Rouillard, professor at the École nationale des arts décoratifs pour les peintures murales. That wall also has a commission from the Confraternity of the Rosary installed in 1636.

== Bibliography (in French) ==
- André Mussat (1964). "Notre-Dame-de-Nantilly à Saumur". Congrès archéologique de France. 122e session. Anjou. 1964. Paris: Société française d'archéologie. p. 559-571.
- Marcel Deyres (1987). "Notre-Dame de Nantilly". Anjou roman. la nuit des temps, no. 9 (2 ed.). La Pierre-qui-Vire: Zodiaque. p. 83-89. ISBN 2-7369-0039-1., planches 28-31
- Jacques Mallet (2000). L'art roman de l'ancien Anjou. Paris: Picard. p. 180-183. ISBN 978-2-7084-0110-5.

== External links (in French) ==
- Saumur ville d'art et d'histoire : Laissez-vous conter l'église Notre-Dame de Nantilly
- Focus Saumur : L'église Notre-Dame de Nantilly
- Inventaire nationale des orgues : Église Notre-Dame-de-Nantilly
