= Gilles of Saumur =

French archbishop (died 1266)

Gilles of Saumur (died 23 April 1266) was an Angevin cleric and preacher who was the first (and only) archbishop of Damietta during the Seventh Crusade, and the archbishop of Tyre from 1253 to 1266. As archbishop of Tyre he was an important administrator and mediator in the Kingdom of Jerusalem. At the end of his life he returned to Europe where he was responsible for preaching and organizing a new crusade.

== Early life ==
Very little is known about Gilles's origins. Bernard Hamilton called him a Breton, but he was most likely from Anjou, as he was buried in Saumur. He may have been born as early as the last quarter of the 12th century, or perhaps as late as 1210. Just before his death in 1266, he donated a house to the Abbey of Saint-Florent in Saumur, where he was perhaps educated as a child. A certain Gilles is attested as a deacon in the diocese of Angers between 1215 and 1231, who may have been Gilles of Saumur. All that can be said with certainty is that his early life is almost completely obscure. In 1241, Alphonse of Poitiers, the brother of king Louis IX of France, was knighted in Saumur; supposedly, Gilles was present and gave a sermon, and Louis noticed his talent as a preacher. While Gilles was certainly a member of Louis's retinue several years later, there is no reliable evidence that they met in Saumur in 1241.

== Seventh Crusade ==
Gilles participated in the Seventh Crusade. The first definite record of Gilles is from 1249 when Louis captured the port of Damietta in Egypt. The city's mosque was turned into a cathedral and Gilles was appointed as archbishop. He was consecrated by the papal legate Eudes de Chateauroux. According to the cathedral's foundation charter, Gilles was granted two-thirds of the tithes of the archdiocese, several properties worth 5000 bezants in revenue, ten fiefs that would allow him to provide knights to serve in Louis's army, permission to use his own weights and measures in the city's markets, and exemption from taxes for merchandise passing through the city or on ships travelling along the Nile. However, the next year Louis was defeated and captured at the Battle of Fariskur. In exchange for his release in May 1250, the crusaders were forced to abandon Damietta. Gilles accompanied Louis to Acre, the capital of the Kingdom of Jerusalem.

== Archbishop of Tyre ==
In July 1252, while Louis and Gilles were in Jaffa, Gilles was compensated for the loss of his archdiocese with an annual income of 200 livres parisis, which he was set to receive until he could be appointed to another see. This occurred shortly afterwards in 1253, when a raid from Damascus killed 800 of Louis's men at Sidon. Louis himself helped bury them, along with Gilles and the archbishop of Tyre, Nicholas Larcat. Several days later, Nicholas died. Louis nominated Gilles as the new archbishop. Pope Innocent IV finally confirmed his election in January 1254, although Gilles was not officially consecrated until the autumn of 1255, just before Eudes de Chateauroux returned to France.

In the meantime, in the summer of 1254, while he was still archbishop-elect, Gilles bought a house from the Hospitallers for 40 bezants and founded a hospital for Breton pilgrims. Eudes authorized the construction of an oratory dedicated to St. Martin, the patron saint of the province of Tours; Tours was the metropolitan archdiocese of Angers as well as the dioceses of Brittany. In early 1255 Gilles also acquired another house from the Hospitallers. These properties were located in the Montmusard suburb of Acre on the vicus Anglorum, the street of the English, which had been settled by English crusaders after the Third Crusade. The foundation of the Breton hospital was confirmed by Pope Alexander IV in March 1256.

In April 1255, Gilles was assigned to govern the church of Jerusalem, which had been without a patriarch since the death of Robert of Nantes in June 1254. Gilles administered the church until the arrival of the new patriarch, James Pantaleon, in June 1256. During this time, Gilles was also involved in a dispute with an Italian cleric named Signoretto, who falsely claimed to have received benefices in the cathedral of Acre. Florent, the bishop of Acre (and a suffragan of the archbishop of Tyre) was in Rome complaining to the pope about this matter in person, so it was Gilles who settled the dispute with Signoretto in Acre.

During this time the War of Saint Sabas broke out between the Venetian and Genoese merchant communities in Acre. Both communities had been attempting to take possession of a house owned by the monastery of Saint Sabas, after which the war is named. In 1251 a Venetian merchant had killed a Genoese merchant in Acre, and in 1256 the two sides attacked and captured each other's ships in the harbour. The Pisan community was also involved, initially in support of the Genoese, but it switched allegiances and supported the Venetians in 1257. In 1258 the war ended after a naval battle between the Venetians and Genoese. Because of these conflicts the Venetians decided to promote their representative in Tyre. Previously there had been a bailo in Acre, to whom the representative in Tyre was subject. In 1254 the official in Tyre was also raised to the status of bailo. One of the first acts of Andrea Dolfin, the new bailo in Tyre, was to negotiate an agreement with Gilles on the relationship between the Venetian community and the local church.

Gilles was also involved in the annulment of the marriage of Balian of Arsuf and Plaisance of Antioch. An agreement could not be reached, so in 1257 Gilles sent the case to the papal court. The pope succeeded in annulling the marriage in 1258. Gilles then travelled to Italy to meet with the pope and to explain, in person, the difficulties faced by the crusader kingdom due to the recent Mongol incursion into the Middle East. The Mongol threat was well-known to the pope, as they had already invaded eastern Europe in the 1230s and 1240s. Now, the Mongols sacked Baghdad in 1258 and were threatening the crusader states as well.

While Gilles was in Italy, Alexander IV died and Gilles's metropolitan, the patriarch Jacques Pantaleon, became Pope Urban IV.

Urban was very attentive to the needs of the crusader states. He sent Gilles and John of Valenciennes, lord of Haifa, to France to preach and raise money for the organization of a new crusade. In July 1262 he met with Louis IX and James I of Aragon at Clermont-Ferrand, and in the autumn of 1263 he met Robert de Sorbon in Paris. Urban also assigned Gilles to collect 1% of the income of all French clergy for the next five years. Gilles was also allowed to collect income from the dioceses of Cambrai, Toul, Liège, Metz, and Verdun in the Holy Roman Empire. The archbishop of Rouen Eudes Rigaud and the bishop of Bayeux Eudes de Lorris were assigned to make sure that Gilles and John received this money. When Urban IV died in 1264, his successor Pope Clement IV was less interested in the fate of the crusader states; he preferred to divert the money that had been raised so far toward the ongoing war between the papacy and Manfred of Sicily. Gilles, frustrated with the policies of the new pope, asked to be relieved of his assignment to preach the crusade so that he could live out the rest of his life in Tyre. The pope agreed but the message never reached Gilles.

== Death ==
Gilles died in Dinant on 23 April 1266. His body was brought back to Saumur and was buried in Notre-Dame de Nantilly Church. His tomb was desecrated during the French Revolution, and today nothing remains but his crozier.

Clement IV initially wanted to appoint the bishop of Le Mans to replace Gilles in Tyre. The canons of the cathedral of Tyre instead elected their own archdeacon. This election was confirmed by the patriarch of Jerusalem William II of Agen, but not by the pope, who compromised by selecting the local bishop of Sidon, John of Saint Maxentius.

== Sources ==
- Chamard, François (1860). "Gilles de Tyr ou une gloire en Anjou sous le règne de saint Louis". Revue de l'Anjou et du Maine (in French). 6: 129–146.
- Hamilton, Bernard (1980). The Latin Church in the Crusader States: The Secular Church. Taylor & Francis. ISBN 978-0-86-078072-4.
- Jacoby, David (2003). "New Venetian evidence on crusader Acre". In Edbury, Peter W.; Phillips, Jonathan (eds.). The Experience of Crusading, vol. 2: Defining the Crusader Kingdom. Cambridge University Press. pp. 240–256. ISBN 0-521-78151-5.
- Claverie, Pierre-Vincent (2003). "De l'entourage royal à l'entourage pontifical : l'exemple méconnu de l'archevêque Gilles de Tyr († 1266)". In Kupper, Jean-Louis; Marchandisse, Alain (eds.). À l'ombre du Pouvoir : Les entourages princiers au Moyen Âge (in French). Presses universitaires de Liège. pp. 48–66. ISBN 978-2-87019-283-2.
- Lower, Michael (2018). The Tunis Crusade of 1270: A Mediterranean History. Oxford University Press. ISBN 978-0-19-874432-0.

Catholic Church titles
Preceded by Nicholas Larcat	Archbishop of Tyre; 1253–1266	Succeeded by John of Saint Maxentius
