= Baba Fakruddin =

Indian sufi saint

Hazrat Khwaja Syed Shah Baba Fakhruddin al-Hasani al-Hussaini Suhrawardi
- سید شاه بابا فخرالدین حسنی الحسینی

Personal life
- Born: Syed Fakhr al-Din; 26 June 1169 CE Shahpur, Sistan
- Died: 5 May 1295 CE (aged 125–126) Penukonda, India
- Resting place: Penukonda, Andhra Pradesh, India
- Flourished: Islamic golden age
- Parent(s): Sultan Syed Hussain, Syeda Bibi Fatima Sagir

Religious life
- Religion: Islam
- Tariqa: Qalandariyya Suhrawardiyya
- Creed: Sufi

Muslim leader
- Initiated: Syed Yusuf Qattal Hussaini Suhrawardi
- Influenced by: Jamal al-Din Saoji

Syed Baba Fakhr al-Din al-Hasani al-Hussaini (d. 1295 CE/ 694 AH) commonly known as Baba Fakhruddin was a Persian Sufi of Suhrawardiyya order from present-day Eastern Iran.

Baba Fakhruddin was a disciple and successor of Pir Nathar Tabl e Aalam Badshah Natahar Vali of Tiruchirappalli. He was Shahanshaah (King of Kings) of Sistan and Shahpur of present-day Eastern Iran later abdicated the throne to take the path of Sufism. He was a direct descendant of Mohammed through Imam Hassan paternally and Imam Hussain maternally.

He traveled on foot from Sistan to Tiruchirappalli via Makkah, Madina, Afghanistan, Kashmir, and Gujrat states of India where he was initiated into the Qalandariyya Suhrawardiyya order by his Murshid Tabl e Aalam Nathar Vali at Tiruchirappalli. He was later accorded spiritual succession by his murshid and was set to find his abode where the Miswak spurt leaves. Baba Fakhruddin made Penukonda his home and final resting place.

== Parentage and ancesotors ==
According to Shahgada Qalandar, a biographical account of the life of Baba Fakhruddin by his nephew and successor Syed Yusuf Qattal Hussaini, Baba Fakhruddin was born in 564 AH to Sultan Syed Hussain, Syeda Bibi Fatima Sagir. His ancestors were descendants of Muhammad and were from Makkah and his grand uncle, Sultan Mohammed Hussain, was the Sharief of Makkah. Sultan Abul Khasim, the grandfather of Baba Fakhruddin invaded and conquered Sistan from Akhahir on the orders of elder brother Sultan Mohammed Hussain, the Sharief of Makkah. After the conquest and Syed Hussain became the Sultan of Sistan and Shahpur.

Baba Fakhruddin was an expert in Quranic studies and an Islamic jurist, he also was adept in battle skills. He ascended to the throne of Sistan and Shahpur and became Shahanshaah (King of Kings) of Sistan and Shahpur after his father. He was a great king loved by his subjects until he decided to abdicate the throne and renounced worldly pleasures to seek the path of Sufism.

== Life as a Qalandar ==
Baba Fakhruddin abdicated the throne and became a dervish and traveled to many cities in search of a perfect master and found his guide and master Nathar Vali in Tiruchirappalli. Nathar Vali himself was a Persian King who too abdicated the throne in search of God. Baba Fakhruddin served his master for 23 years and became a perfect master himself and was appointed Khalifa (Spiritual Successor) by his Murshid. Nathar Vali gave Baba Fakhruddin 300 qalandars from his 900 qalandars and ordered them to accompany Baba Fakhruddin and sent them towards Penukonda, his final abode.

He undertook severe penance, self-mortification practices (mujāhadah ) and became engrossed in prayers for a long stretch of periods without food or water and attained higher spiritual stations, and showed several miracles during his lifetime. He remained celibate throughout his life and devoted himself to God. His nephew Yusuf Qattal Hussaini became his Khalifa - spiritual successor and the custodianship of the shrine continued in his family to date.

Baba Fakhruddin lived a life of 126 years (130 Lunar years) and departed this world on Thursday 12 Jumada al-Thani 694 AH/ 5 May 1295 CE, after Zuhr prayers.

== Spiritual genealogy ==
Baba Fakhruddin was initiated into Qalandariyya Suhrawardiyya order of Sufism and the spiritual genealogy traces back to Imam Ali through several Imams and Qalandars namely Pir Nathar Tabl Alam Badshah, Shaikh Ali Zuwalqi of Shewan, Lal Shahbaz Qalandar, Ibrahim Mujarrad Karbalai, Jamal al-Din Saoji

The merging of Suhrawardiyya branch with Qalandariyya chain possibly can be attributed to Lal Shahbaz Qalandar however he was not a disciple of Bahauddin Zakariya Multani but a good friend, and possibly received ijazah/khilafat, whose legendary spiritual friendship is well known in Sindh, Pakistan as Char Yaar The attachment was so cordial and spiritual that their friendship became legendary and they were known as Chahar Yar (Four Friends), the other two friends were Farīd al-Dīn Masʿūd Ganj-i-Shakar and Jalaluddin "Surkh-Posh" Bukhari

== Urs ==
Annually his death anniversary is commemorated on 12 Jumada al-Thani of the Islamic calendar. The urs ceremonies start with the Qalandariya flag hoisting at the shrine by Sajjada Nashein, the Chief Hereditary custodian of the shrine who is from the family of Baba Yusuf Qattal Hussaini, the nephew, and successor of Baba Fakhruddin, on 6th Jumada al-Thani.

Urs is observed from 6th to 14th Jumada al-Thani at his mausoleum in Penukonda. Several hundred thousand people from different countries, religions, and all walks of life gather to seek blessings.

== Mausoleum ==
The shrine of Baba Fakhruddin is the chief seat in Madras Presidency for faqirs. Each year on the 1st day of Jamadi-ul-Akhar, the faqirs of all orders Banava, Rifaʽi, Madariyya, Malang, and Shah Jalal congregate at this place and select their office bearers. The appointed faqir of Shah Banava goes on a two-year pilgrimage to the tombs of the saints in the Presidency.

His mausoleum is located in Penukonda, Andhra Pradesh, India, and is accessible by road, and railway the closest airport is the Kempegowda International Airport, Bangalore, India

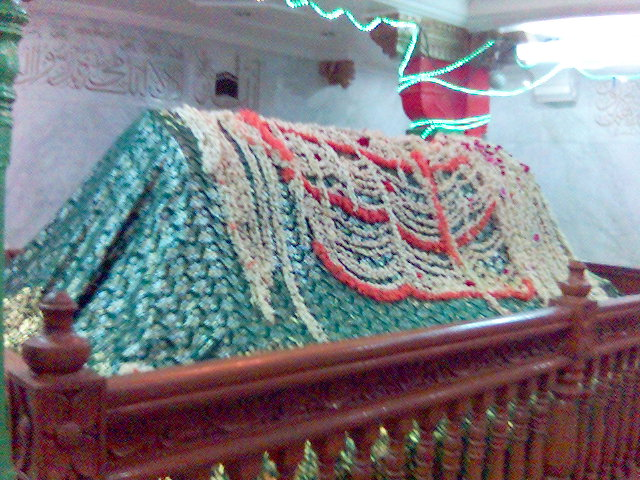
Mazar-e-Mubarak Baba Fakhruddin in renovated Mausoleum

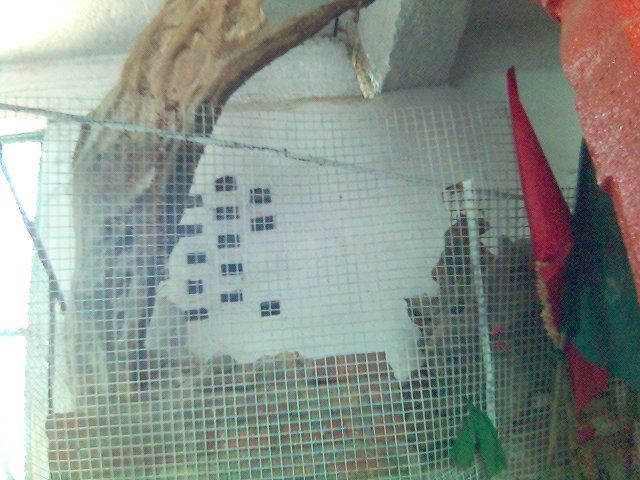
Tree Planted by Baba in Dargah Premises (Around 750 Yrs old)

Chilla Pahad - Small hill where Baba Prayed for years in a cave

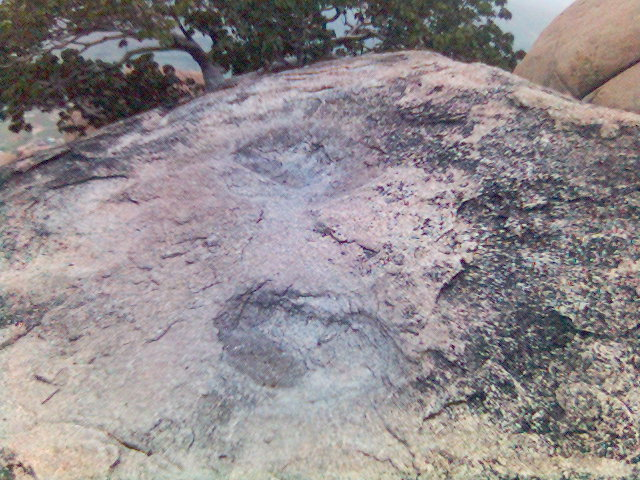
Rock bearing foot impression of Hazrat Baba Fakhruddin at Chilla Pahad
