= Damietta =

Damietta دمياط (Egyptian Arabic)
- City
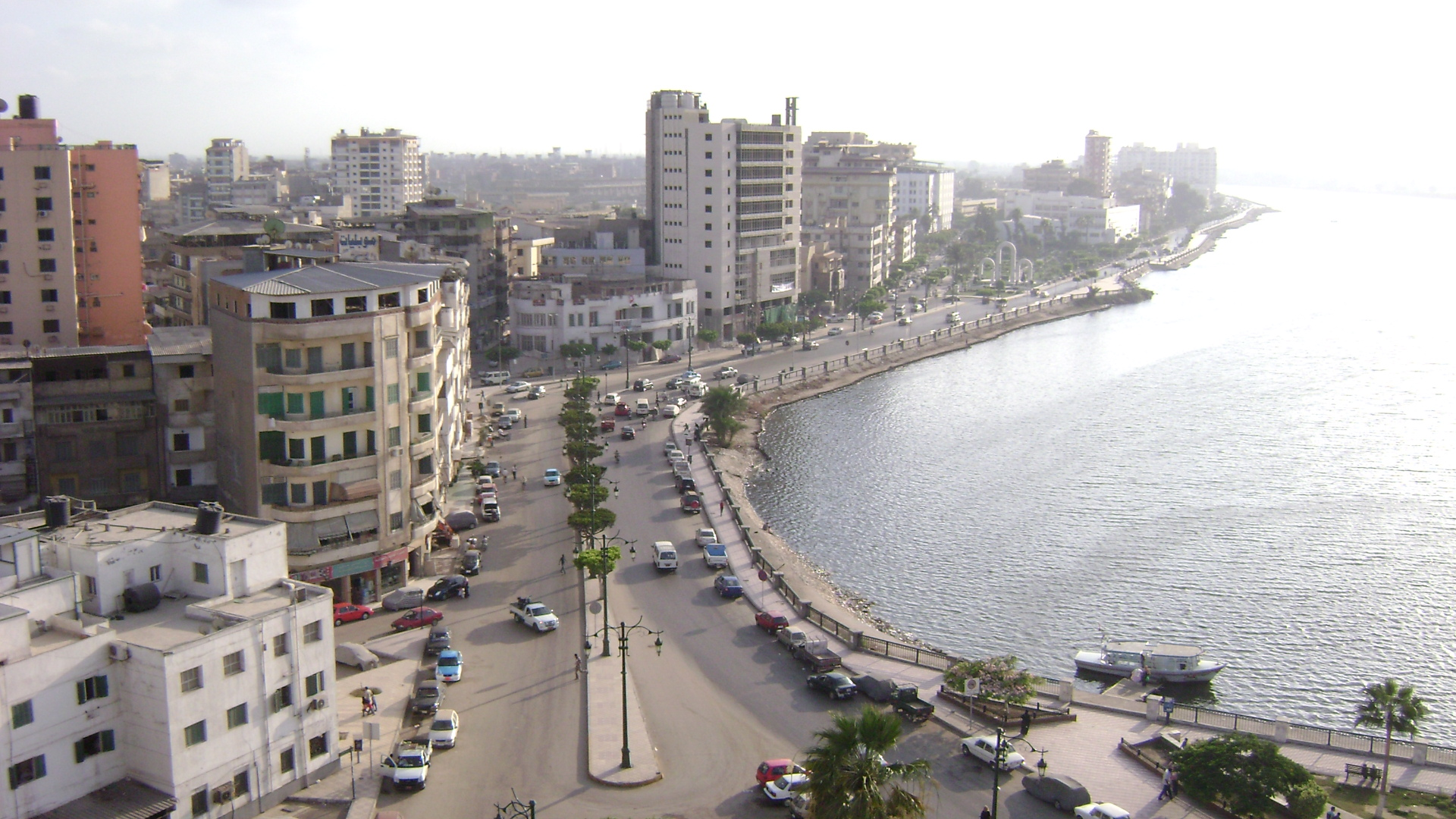
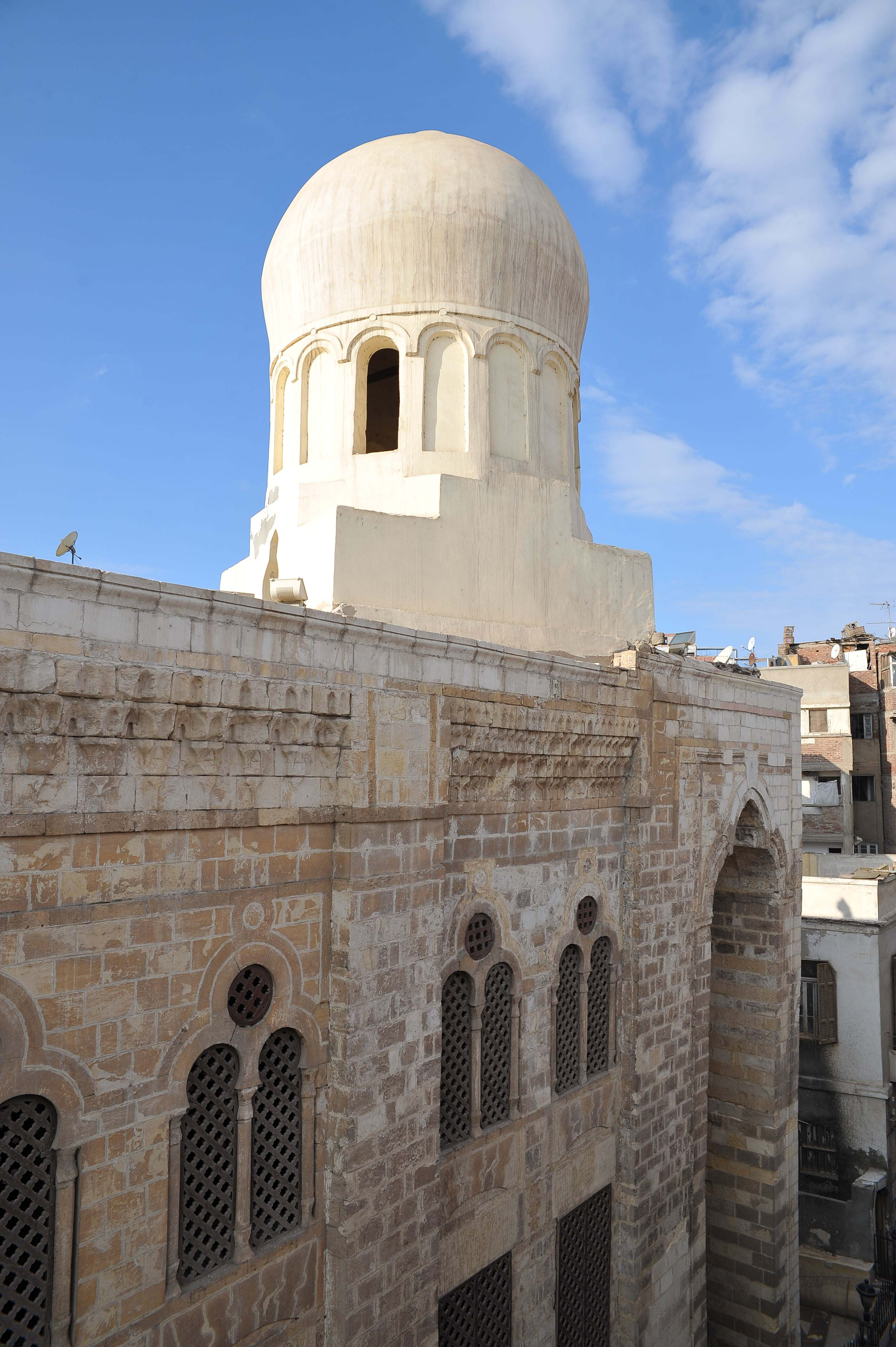
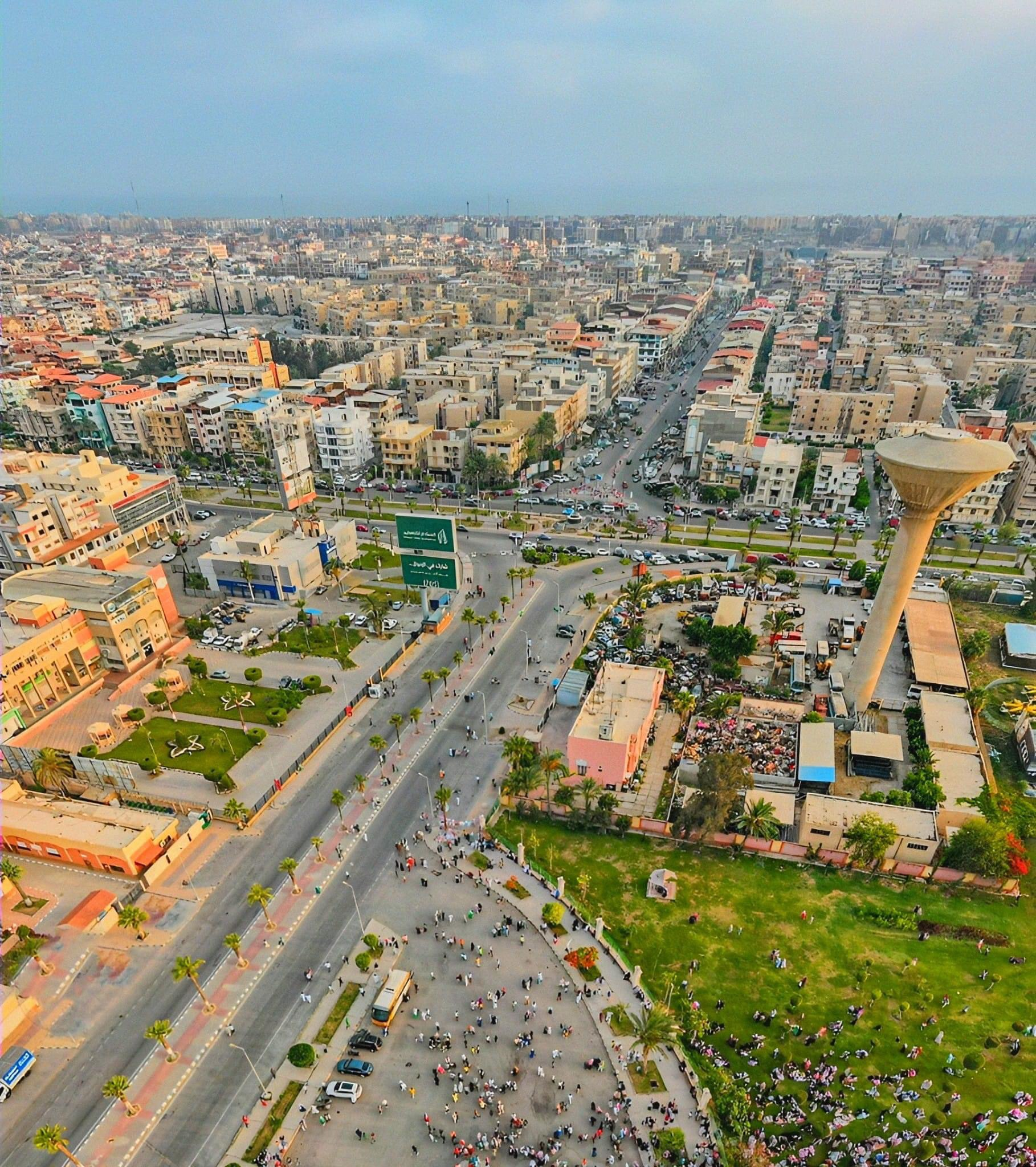
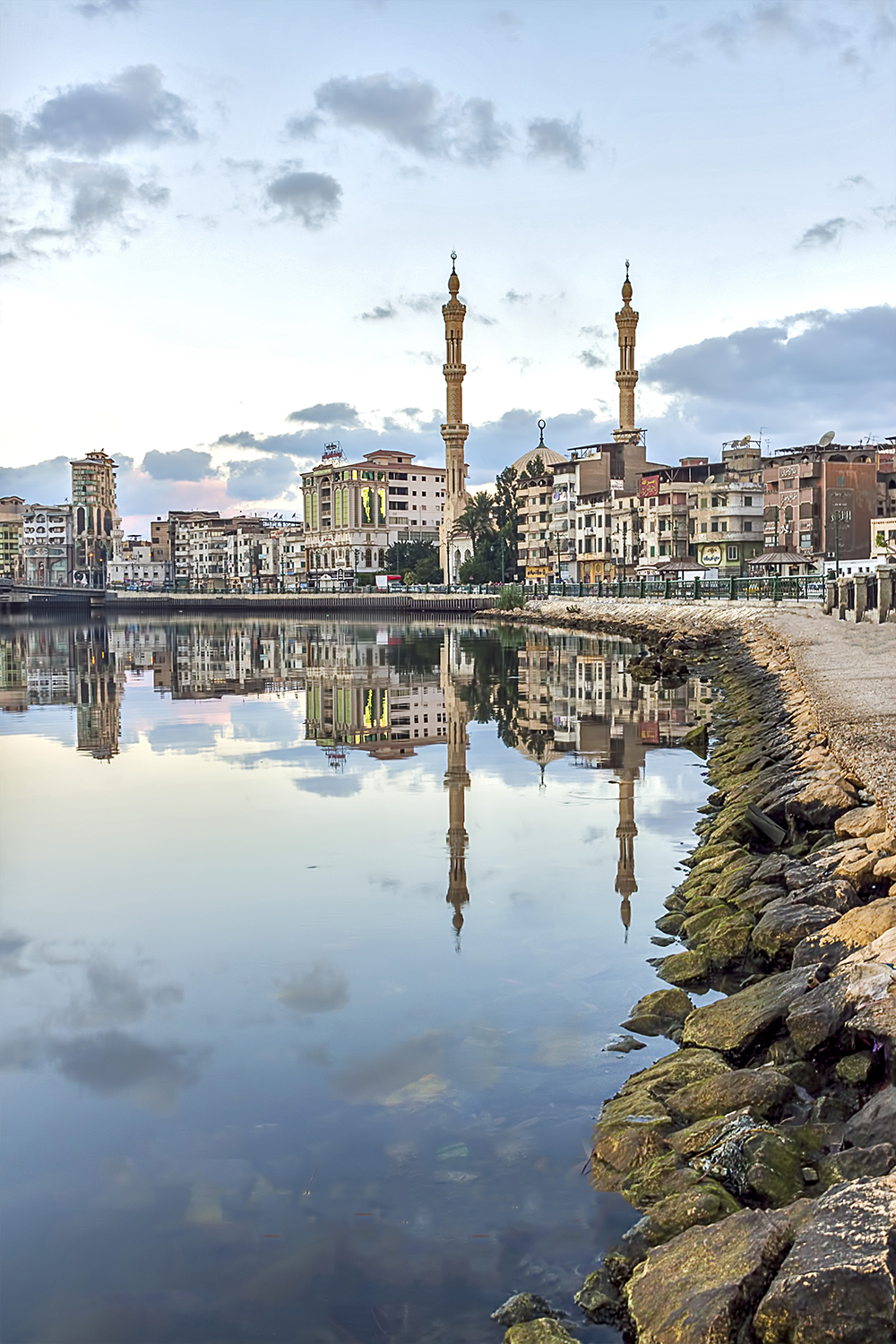
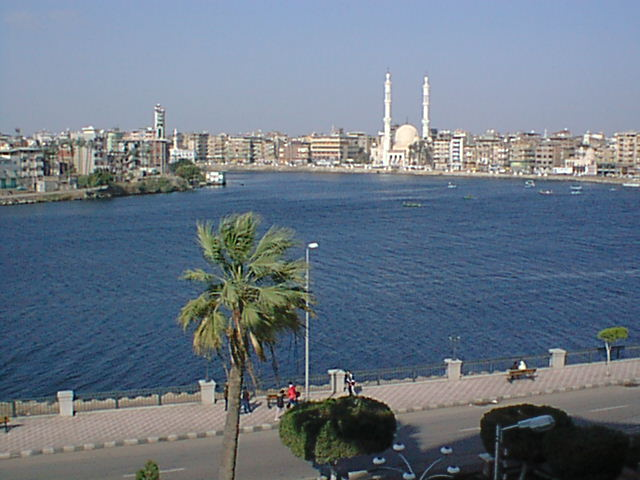
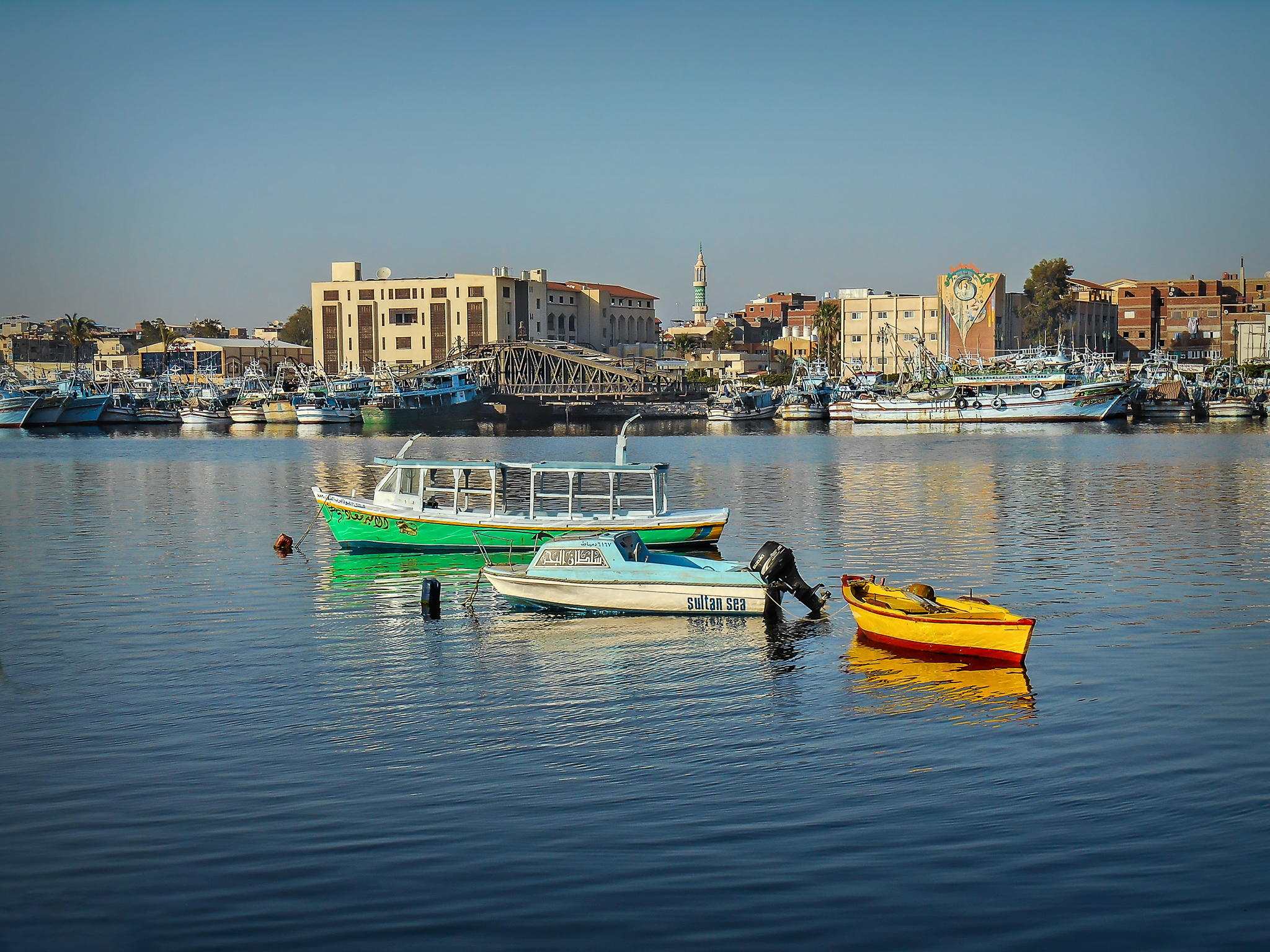
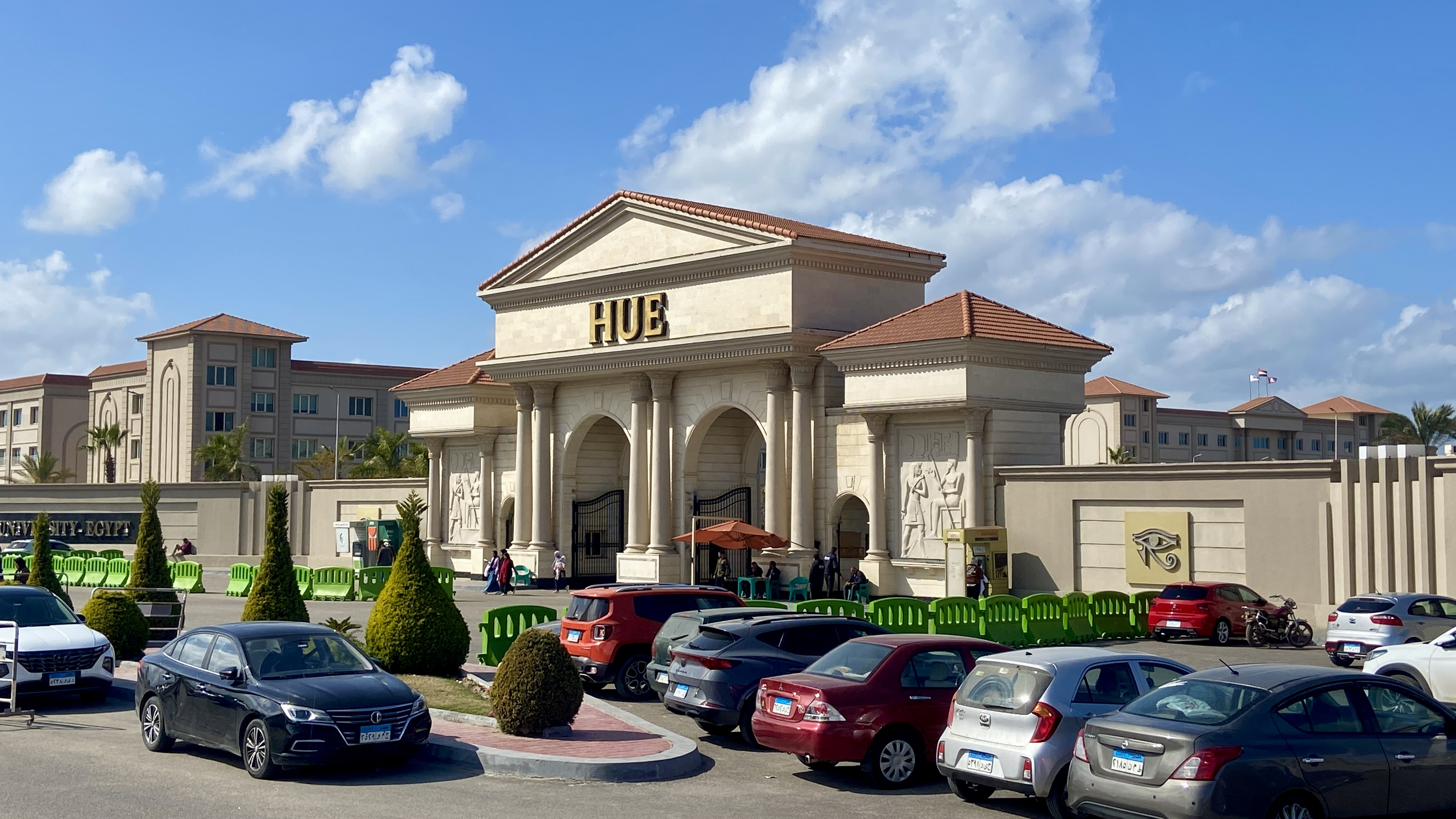
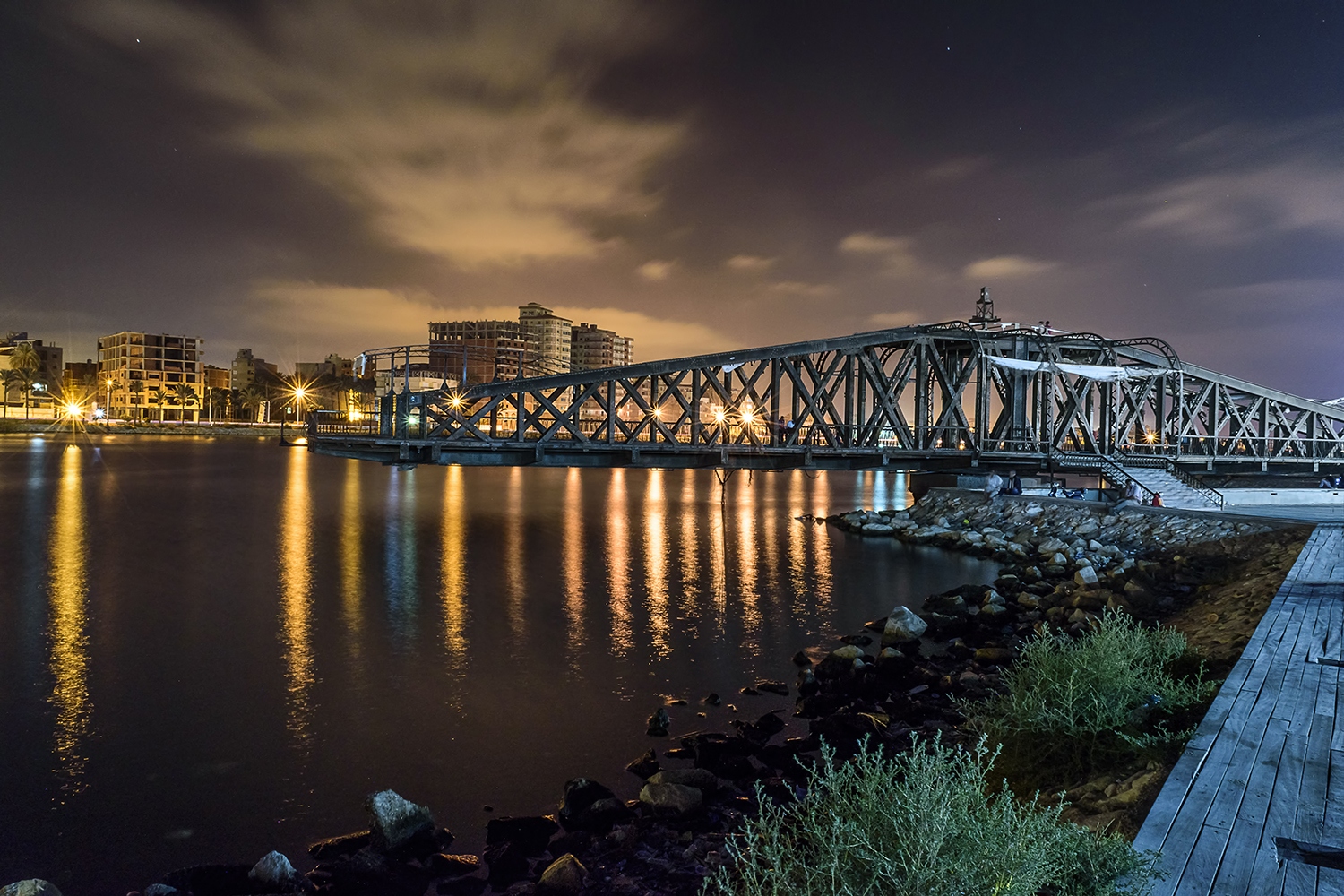
- Nile Corniche Maeini Mosque Damietta Central Park El-Bahr Mosque The Nile Misr Public Library Horus University Damietta bridge

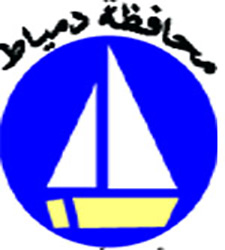
- Flag Seal

- Location of Damietta within Egypt
- Coordinates: 31°25′00″N 31°49′17″E
- Country: Egypt
- Governorate: Damietta

Area
  - City: 3.53 km^{2} (1.36 sq mi)
- Elevation: 16 m (52 ft)

Population (2024)
  - City: 305,920
  - Density: 88,630/km^{2} (229,600/sq mi)
  - Metro: 1,100,000
- Demonym: Damiettan

GDP
  - Metro: EGP 110 billion (US$ 7 billion)
- Time zone: UTC+2 (EET)
  - Summer (DST): UTC+3 (EEST)
- Area code: (+20) 57

Damietta (Egyptian Arabic: دمياط, romanized: Dumyāṭ, pronounced [domˈjɑːtˤ]) is a port city which serves as the capital city of the Damietta Governorate in Egypt. It is located at the Damietta branch, an eastern distributary of the Nile Delta, 15 kilometres (9.3 mi) from the Mediterranean Sea, and about 200 kilometres (120 mi) north of Cairo. The city was a Catholic bishopric and is a multiple titular see. Damietta is also a member of the UNESCO Global Network of Learning Cities, having joined in 2019.

== Etymology ==
Egyptologist Heinrich Karl Brugsch believed that the town was Het-nebset in ancient Egypt. Damietta is an Italian adaptation of the Arabic name Dumyāṭ. The settlement is called Tamiat/Tamiati (Coptic: ⲧⲁⲙⲓⲁϯ Late Coptic: [dɑmˈjɑdi]) in Coptic. The medieval author al-Maqrizi believed that Damietta's name originated from the Syriac language. In medieval Jewish tradition reflected in Geniza documents the city is equated with biblical Capthor (Biblical Hebrew: כפתור) and is called Kapotkya (Biblical Hebrew: קפוטקיא).

== Geography ==
Damietta is 1-2 metres above sea level and 12 kilometres from the mouth of the eastern tributary of the Nile Delta. Coastal progradation by the Nile created the land in the area in the 1st millennium.

== History ==
=== Early history and Islam ===
The first historical mention of Damietta was by the 6th-century geographer Stephanus of Byzantium . The city was called Tamíathis (Ancient Greek: Ταμίαθις) in the Hellenistic period. George of Cyprus wrote about the city around 605 AD. In 1885, Karl Baedeker wrote that a stone featuring the name of Domitian (r. 81–96) was in Damietta.

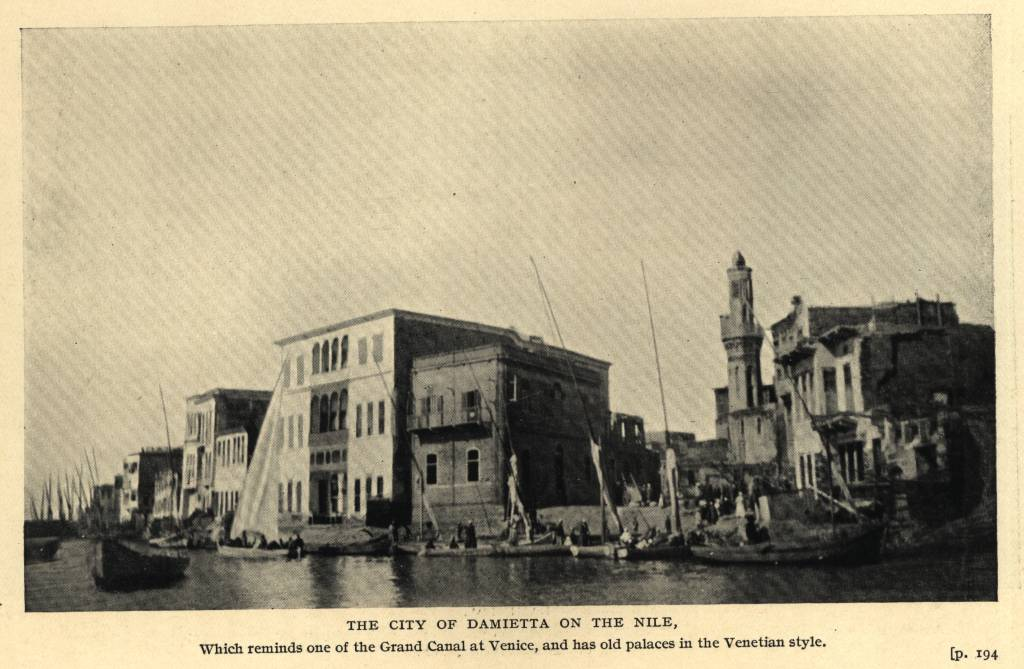
A 1911 postcard: the City of Damietta on the Nile.

Miqdad ibn Aswad conquered Damietta and the rest of Egypt. The Byzantine Empire attacked Damietta in 708–709, 738–739, 852–853, 921, and 968. Caliph al-Mutawakkil had walls built for the city after the Byzantines sacked the city in 853.

The Amr ibn al-As Mosque is reported to be the second oldest mosque in Egypt.

The Sufi organisation Qalandariyya was founded by Jamal al-Din Saoji in Damascus and Damietta in the 13th century.

The Abbasid Caliphate used Alexandria, Damietta, Aden and Siraf as entry ports to India and Tang China.

Badr al-Jamali started his four year military campaign in Egypt after arriving in Damietta in December 1073.

The Veil of St. Anne was woven in Damietta in 1096 or 1097.

=== Crusaders ===
Damietta was attacked by crusaders in 1155 and by a joint crusader and Byzantine force in 1169. Amalric, King of Jerusalem sieged the city in 1169, but failed and additional city walls were created for Damietta.

During preparations for the Fifth Crusade in 1217, it was decided that Damietta should be the focus of attack. Control of Damietta meant control of the Nile, and from there the Crusaders believed they could conquer Egypt. From Egypt, they could then attack Ayyubid-ruled Palestine and recapture Jerusalem. After the siege of Damietta of 1218–19, the port was occupied by the Crusaders. The siege devastated the population of Damietta. After the crusaders captured Damietta in November 1219, they looted the city. Only 3,000 of the city's 70,000 inhabitants survived the siege.

Earlier that year, Francis of Assisi had arrived to negotiate with the Muslim ruler peaceably. In 1221 the Crusaders attempted to march to Cairo, but were destroyed by the combination of nature and Muslim defenses.

Damietta was also the object of the Seventh Crusade, led by Louis IX of France. His fleet arrived there in 1249 and quickly captured the fort, which he refused to hand over to the nominal king of Jerusalem, to whom it had been promised during the Fifth Crusade. However, having been taken prisoner with his army in April 1250, Louis was obliged to surrender Damietta as ransom.

=== Modern ===
Damietta was destroyed by the Mamluks in November 1250, and a new town was founded to the south around an old mosque. The first mention of Damietta in Mamluk sources after its destruction was when Sultan Aybak gave the town to Prince Ala' al-Din Aydaghdi al-Azizi in 1254. Sultan Baybars ordered that the river be blocked to seafaring ships in 1260, and this work was completed in 1264.

The Republic of Genoa attacked Damietta in May 1384, and February 1412.

The first mention of a governor for Damietta was by scholar Izz al-Din ibn Shaddad in 1285. The governorship was upgraded to viceroyalty by Sultan Barsbay in 1427. Ibn Battuta wrote during his stay in Damietta that Governor Ahmad ibn Bilbak al-Muhsini would not allow anybody to enter or leave the port without his permission. The historian Ibn Duqmaq was governor for a short period. Governor Muhammad al-Salakhuri was killed in a riot in 1418, after a group of fishermen rose up in rebellion.

A fire broke out across the city in 1425 and destroyed one-third of Damietta.

Sultan Al-Mansur Ali was banished to Damietta after being overthrown by Qutuz in 1259. Prince Yalbugha al-Salimi was exiled to the city from 1400 to 1402. The Ottomans banished people to Damietta, such as Umar Makram in 1809.

Ottoman soldiers sent to Arabia and Yemen commonly went via a sea route going through Damietta and then on land to Cairo.

Koca Hüsrev Mehmed Pasha was sent to Egypt to suppress a rebellion by Albanian soldiers. However, he was defeated in Alexandria and withdrew to Damietta. At Damietta he surrendered to an army led by Muhammad Ali of Egypt and Mamluk leader Uthman Bey al-Bardisi in July 1803.

Damietta was a centre of the Urabi revolt and city governor Abdul-Al supported the Urabi movement.

The first cholera case of the 1883 epidemic that killed 50,000 people in Egypt was reported in Damietta on 22 June.

== Governors ==
Governor	Sultan	Start date	End date	Previous position	Comments	References
Name not recorded	1250	1313			The position of governor existed, but the names of those who held the office was not recorded.	
Ala' al-Din ibn al-Qalanjaqi	Al-Nasir Muhammad	30 July 1313	?			
Ahmad ibn Bilbak al-Muhsini	Al-Nasir Muhammad	1326	?		Ibn Battuta came to Damietta during his tenure as governor. First time as governor.	
Rukn al-Din al-Karaki	Al-Nasir Muhammad	1329	13 November 1329	Governor of Alexandria	He was dismissed after a few months as governor of Damietta.	
Balban al-Husami	Al-Nasir Muhammad	13 November 1329	?	Governor of Giza	First time as governor	
Sayf al-Din Balban al-Muhsini	Al-Nasir Muhammad	?	19 May 1334	Governor of Cairo		
Ahmad ibn Bilbak al-Muhsini	Al-Nasir Muhammad	1335	?		Second time as governor.	
Balban al-Husami	Al-Nasir Muhammad	3 February 1336	?	Governor of Cairo	Second time as governor	
Badr al-Din Muhammad ibn al-Mujahidi	Al-Nasir Muhammad	1336	1338			
Balban al-Husami	Al-Nasir Muhammad	1338	1340		Third time as governor.	
Al-Husam Lajin	Al-Nasir Muhammad	1341	?			
Ala' al-Din Ali ibn al-Tashlaqi	Al-Ashraf Sha'ban	?	1363			
Muhammad ibn al-Sumaysati	Al-Ashraf Sha'ban	1363	?			
Muhammad ibn Tajar	Al-Ashraf Sha'ban	19 April 1378	17 June 1378			
Muhammad ibn Qarabugha	Al-Salih Hajji	?	27 July 1382			
Qutlubugha Abu Darqa	Al-Salih Hajji	27 July 1382	February 1384			
Tashtamur al-Sayfi	Barquq	February 1384	?			

== Ecclesiastical history ==
Hellenistic Tamiathis became a Christian bishopric, a suffragan of the metropolitan see of Pelusium, the capital of the Roman province of Augustamnica Prima, to which Tamiathis belonged. Its bishop Heraclius took part in the Council of Ephesus in 431. Helpidius was a signatory of the decree of Patriarch Gennadius of Constantinople against simony in 459. Bassus was at the Second Council of Constantinople (553). In a letter from Patriarch Michael I of Alexandria read at the Photian Council of Constantinople (879), mention is made of Zacharias of Tamiathis, who had attended a synod that Michael had convened in support of Photius. Later bishops too of Tamiathis are named in other documents.

There are four known bishops for Damietta between 431 and 879. In 1249, when Louis IX of France captured the city, it became for a short time the seat of a Latin Church bishop Gilles of Saumur.

The Latin bishopric, no longer residential, is today listed by the Catholic Church twice as a titular see under the names Tamiathis (Latin) and Damiata (Curiate Italian), each at time of episcopal or archiepiscopal rank, of the Latin and Melkite Catholic Churches.

=== Titular Latin see ===
The diocese was nominally restored in the 17th century when established as Latin titular archbishopric of Damietta of the Romans (Latin: Tamiathis or Tomiathianus Romanorum; Italian: Damiata in Curiate) and had the following incumbents of the intermediary archiepiscopal rank:

- Bernardino Spada (later Cardinal) (1623.12.04 – 1626.01.19)
- Cesare Facchinetti (1639.09.05 – 1672.11.14)
- Neri Corsini (later Cardinal) (1652.08.12 – 1664.01.14)
- Angelo Maria Ranuzzi (later Cardinal) (1668.04.30 – 1678.04.18)
- Ercole Visconti (1678.07.18 – 1712)
- Marco Antonio Ansidei (later Cardinal) (1724.06.12 – 1726.12.16)
- Raffaele Cosimo De Girolami (later Cardinal) (1728.03.08 – 1743.09.09)
- Paul Alphéran de Bussan, Sovereign Military Order of Malta (O.B.E.) (1746.09.19 – 1757.04.20)
- Vincenzo Maria de Francisco e Galletti, Dominican Order (O.P.) (1757.12.19 – 1769.07.19)
- Bonaventura Prestandrea, Conventual Franciscans (O.F.M. Conv.) (1769.12.18 – 1777.12.21)
- Bartolomeo Pacca (later Cardinal) (1785.09.26 – 1801.02.23)
- Giovanni Francesco Compagnoni Marefoschi (1816.04.29 – 1820.09.17)
- Giovanni Giacomo Sinibaldi (1821.08.13 – 1843.01.27) (later Patriarch)*
- Vincenzo Gioacchino Pecci (later Pope Leo XIII) (1843.01.27 – 1846.01.19)
- Diego Planeta (1850.01.07 – 1858.06.05)
- Luigi Oreglia di Santo Stefano (later Cardinal) (1866.05.04 – 1873.12.22)
- Eugène-Louis-Marie Lion, O.P. (1874.03.13 – 1883.08.08)
- Eugenio Lachat, Missionaries of the Precious Blood (C.PP.S.) (1885.03.23 – 1886.11.01)
- Ignazio Persico, O.F.M. Cap. (later Cardinal) (1887.03.14 – 1893.01.16)
- Andrea Aiuti (later Cardinal) (1893.06.12 – 1903.06.22)
- Edoardo Carlo Gastone Pöttickh de Pettenegg, Teutonic Order (O.T.) (1904.11.14 – 1918.10.01)
- Sebastião Leite de Vasconcellos (1919.12.15 – 1923.01.29)
- Luigi Pellizzo (1923.03.24 – 1936.08.14)

Demoted in 1925 as Titular bishopric, it has been vacant for decades, having had the following incumbents, all of the episcopal (lowest) rank:

- Guglielmo Grassi (1937.01.13 – 1954.09.14)
- Eugenio Beitia Aldazabal (1954.10.30 – 1962.01.27)
- Marco Caliaro, Scalabrinians (C.S.) (1962.02.10 – 1962.05.23)
- Antonio Cece (1962.08.06 – 1966.03.31)

=== Titular Melkite see ===
Established in 1900 as titular bishopric of Damietta of the Melkite Greeks (Latin: Tamiathis or Tomiathianus Graecorum Melkitarum; Italian: Damiata), it was suppressed in 1935, after a single incumbent of this episcopal (lowest) rank:

- Titular Bishop Paul-Raphaël Abi-Mourad (1900.07.02 – 1935.08.08)

Restored in 1961 as Titular archbishopric, it has had the following incumbents of the archiepiscopal (intermediary) rank:

- Titular Archbishop Anthony Farage (1961.03.07 – 1963.11.09)
- Titular Archbishop Nicolas Hajj (1965.07.30 – 1984.11.03)
- Titular Archbishop Joseph Jules Zerey (2001.06.22 – 2026.07.08), protosyncellus of Jerusalem of the Greek-Melkites (Palestine)

== Demographics ==
Benjamin of Tudela reported that Damietta had 200 Jews in 1170.

In the 1897 census there were 31,000 to 32,000 people recorded in Damietta, making it the 10th largest settlement in Egypt. In 1907, 1% of Egypt's population lived in Damietta. The Catholic Encyclopedia reported a population of 53,000, with all of them being Muslim except for 75 members of the Melkite Greek Catholic Church, 60 Roman Catholic, and 250 other Christians. Budge reported a population of 29,354 in 1911.

== Climate ==
Köppen-Geiger climate classification system classifies its climate as hot desert (BWh), but blowing winds from the Mediterranean Sea greatly moderate the temperatures, typical to the Egypt's north coast, making its summers moderately hot with relatively high humidity while its winters mild and moderately wet where sleet and hail are also common.

Port Said, Kosseir, Ras El Bar, Baltim, Damietta and Alexandria have the least temperature variation in Egypt.

Climate data for Damietta
Month	Jan	Feb	Mar	Apr	May	Jun	Jul	Aug	Sep	Oct	Nov	Dec	Year
Mean daily maximum °C (°F)	18.1 (64.6)	18.8 (65.8)	19.7 (67.5)	22.7 (72.9)	26.6 (79.9)	28.4 (83.1)	30.5 (86.9)	30.5 (86.9)	28.9 (84.0)	27.3 (81.1)	23.7 (74.7)	20.0 (68.0)	24.6 (76.3)
Daily mean °C (°F)	15.2 (59.4)	15.2 (59.4)	16.7 (62.1)	19.0 (66.2)	22.0 (71.6)	24.5 (76.1)	26.3 (79.3)	27.2 (81.0)	26.3 (79.3)	24.5 (76.1)	21.2 (70.2)	17.2 (63.0)	21.3 (70.3)
Mean daily minimum °C (°F)	8.3 (46.9)	9.2 (48.6)	10.9 (51.6)	13.9 (57.0)	17.8 (64.0)	20.1 (68.2)	21.5 (70.7)	21.8 (71.2)	20.3 (68.5)	19.0 (66.2)	15.8 (60.4)	10.7 (51.3)	15.8 (60.4)
Average rainfall mm (inches)	26 (1.0)	19 (0.7)	13 (0.5)	5 (0.2)	1 (0.0)	0 (0)	0 (0)	0 (0)	0 (0)	7 (0.3)	17 (0.7)	24 (0.9)	112 (4.3)
Average relative humidity (%)	81	78	75	65	60	60	67	73	76	78	80	82	73
Source: Arab Meteorology Book

== Economy ==
The Damietta governorate has a population of around 1,093,580 (2006). It contains the SEGAS LNG (Liquefied Natural Gas) plant, which will ultimately have a capacity of 9.6 million ton/year through two trains. The plant is owned by Segas, a joint venture of the Spanish utility Unión Fenosa (40%), Italian oil company Eni (40%) and the Egyptian companies EGAS and EGPC (10% each).

The plant is unusual since it is not supplied from a dedicated field, but is supplied with gas from the Egyptian grid. As of 2010, EMethanex, the Egyptian division of Methanex Corporation, a Canadian owned company, was building a 3600 MTPD methanol plant. Damietta also has a woodworking industry and is also noted for its White Domiati cheese and other dairy products and Pâtisserie and Egyptian desserts. It is also a fishing port.

=== Sea trade ===
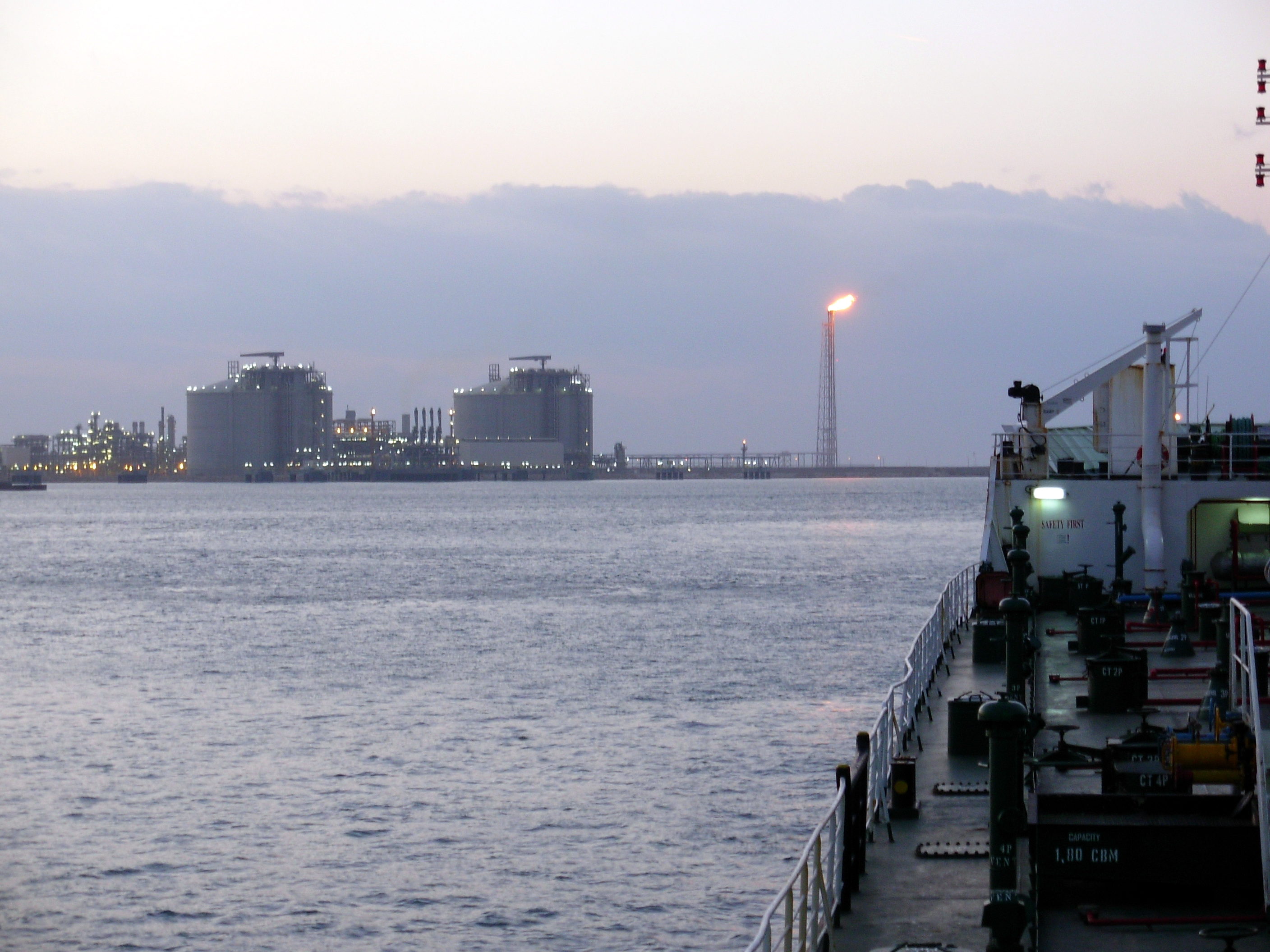
View of the Port of Damietta

Changes to the Nile in the 9th and 10th century, such as the Canopic branch drying up, resulted in trade diverting from Alexandria to Damietta and Rosetta. The abandonment of the port city Tinnis in the 12th century increased the commercial importance of Damietta.

In 1783, 498 ships came to and left Damietta. From 1786 to 1798, around 11.5 million paras were collected by customs in Damietta. This figure was only behind the 12.3 million paras of Alexandria and 15.4 million paras of Cairo. One of the major rice growing areas of Ottoman Egypt was around Damietta.

The creation of the Mahmudiyya Canal diverted trade away from Damietta and to Alexandria. Its importance was further diminished by the Suez Canal. Egyptologist E. A. Wallis Budge blamed the growth of Port Said for the decline of Damietta.

=== Textiles ===
A textile industry exists in Damietta and it was a major producer of silk in the 19th century. The 1872 census reported that 166 workshops produced 20,000 pieces of silk per year. A 1919 government report stated that Damietta was one of the major centres of textile production and had over 200 looms. 'Abd al-Fattah Bey al-Lozy, the largest loom owner in Damietta with 37 looms, produced around 170,000 metres of silk fabric per year in 1910.

Damietta is very famous for its furniture industry. In addition to the Egyptian market, its furniture is sold in Arab countries, Africa, Europe, the United States, and almost all over the world. Today, there is a canal connecting it to the Nile, which has made it an important port once again. Containers are transported through the new Damietta Port.

== Cityscape ==
Landmarks

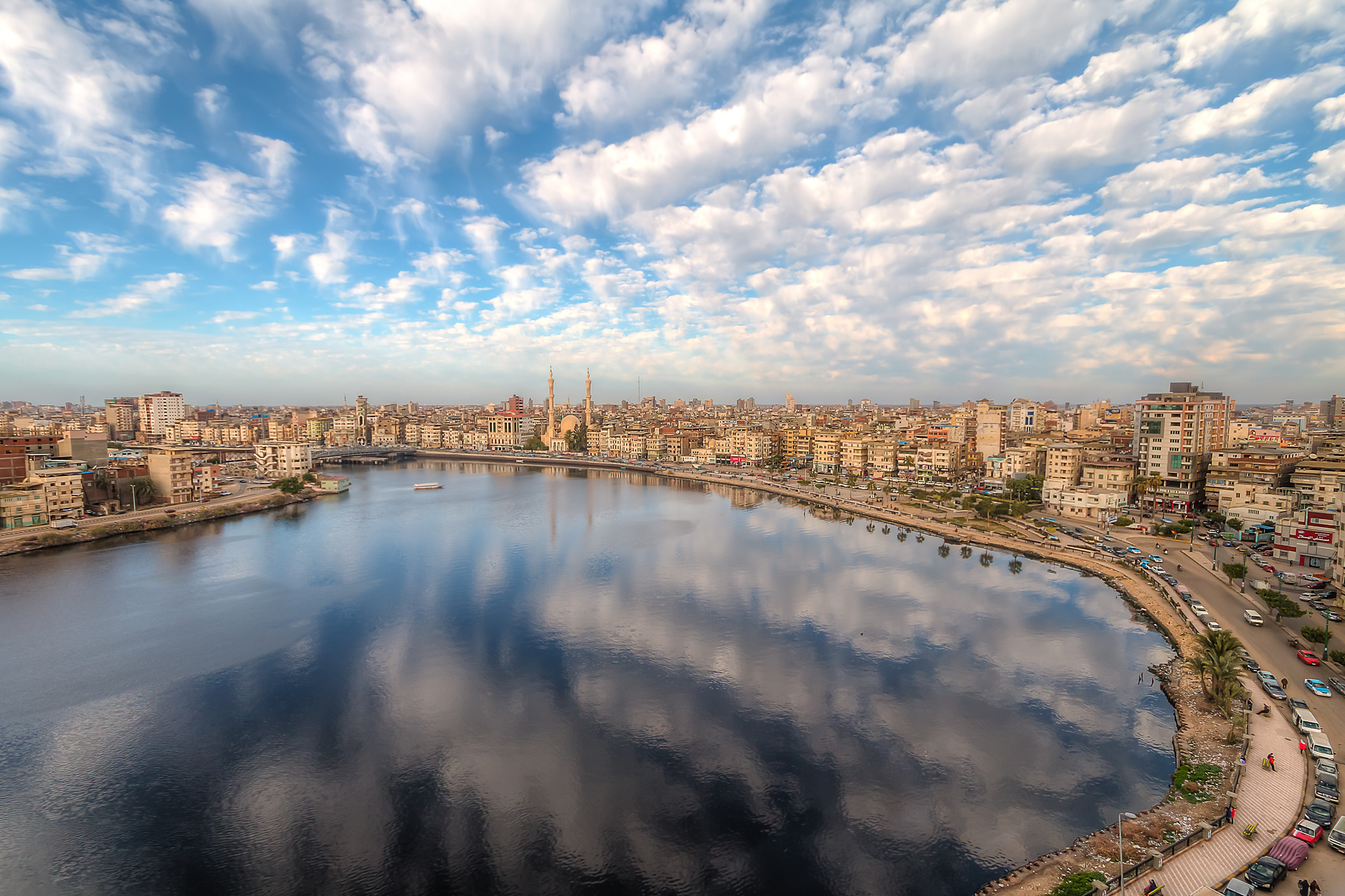
Damietta's Corniche

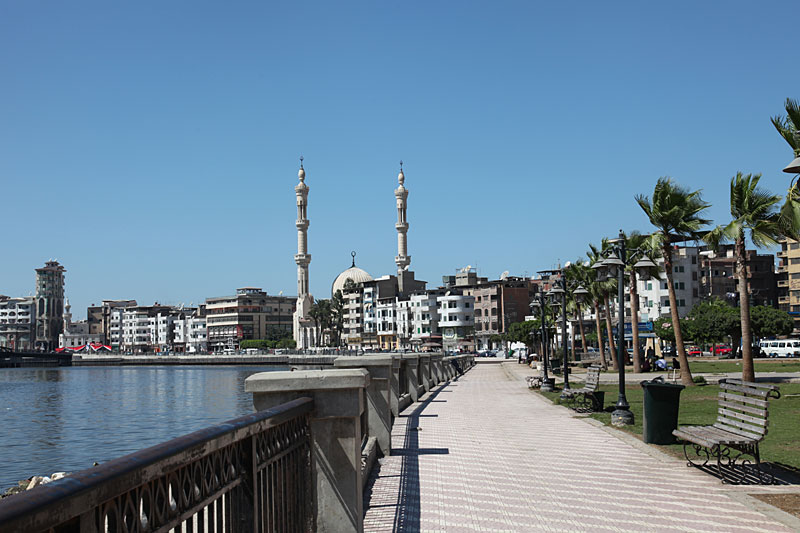
Damietta's Corniche along the Nile.

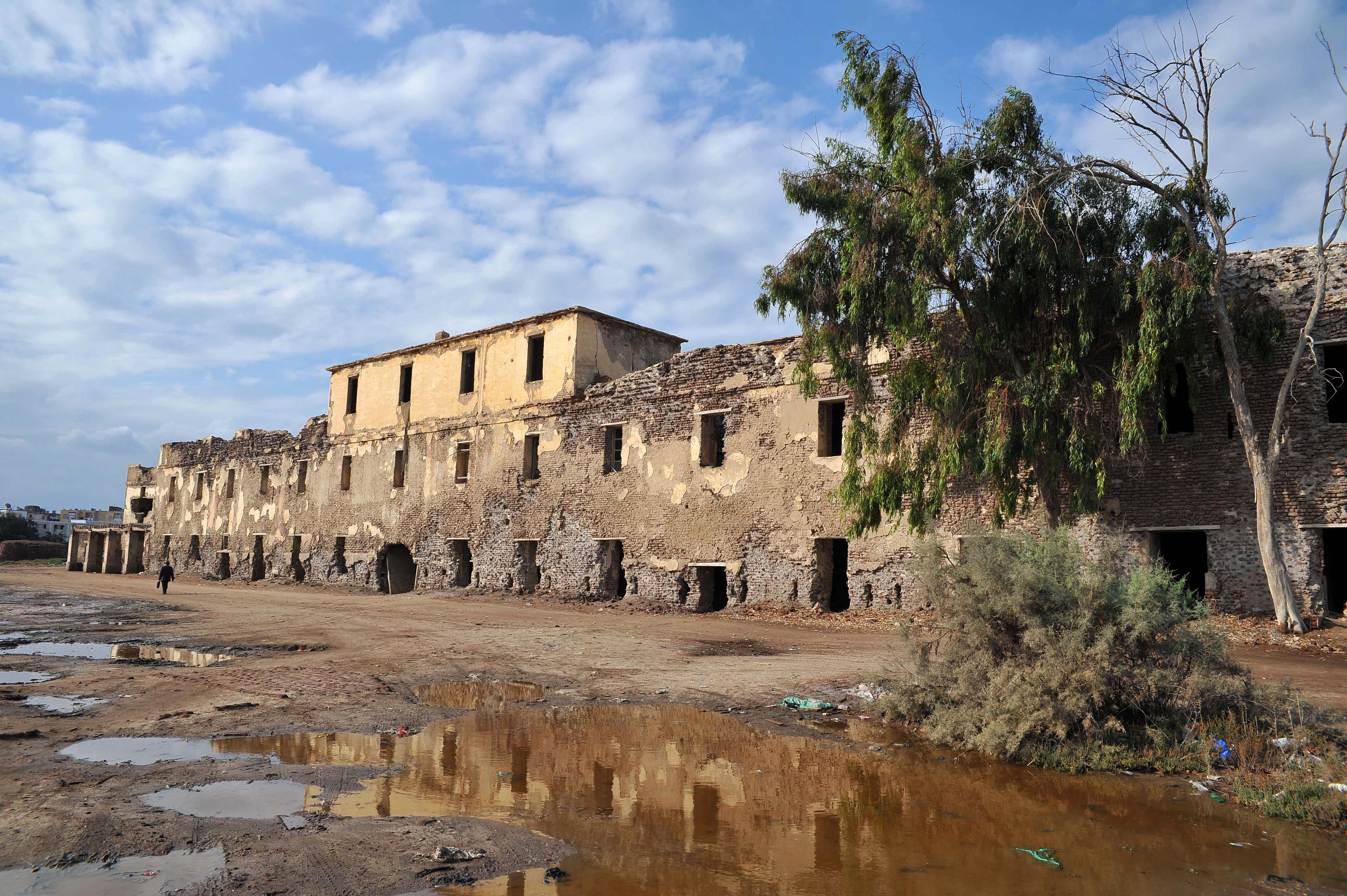
Urabi fort (Tabiet Orabi) in Ezbet al-Borg

- Tabiet Ahmed Urabi, ruins of Damietta Fort at Ezbet El-Borg.
- The Old Bridge (el-Kōbrī el-Qadīm), dating to the early 20th century.
- Souk al-Hesba, the old city centre, dating to the Abbasid rule era.

Mosques

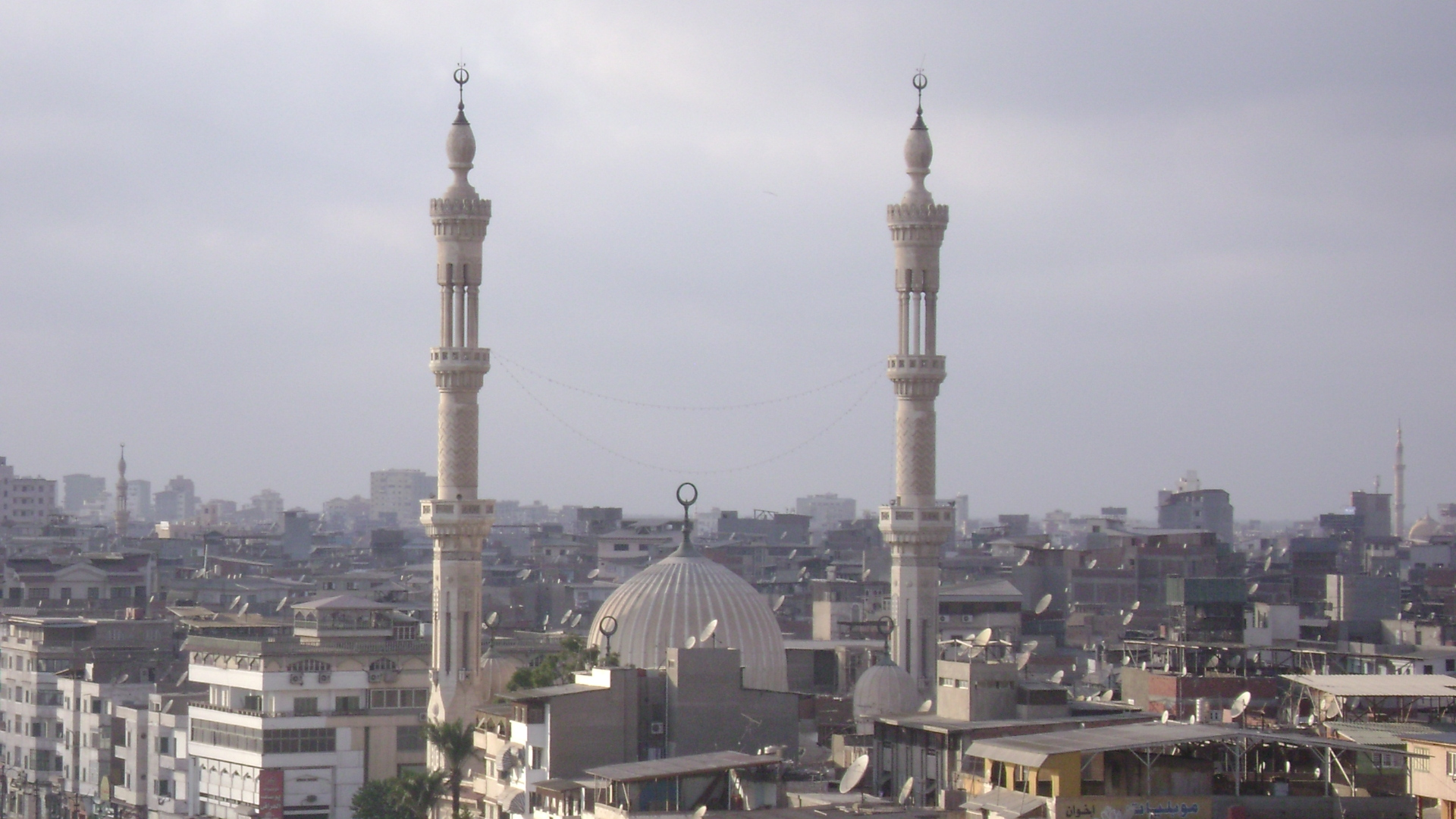
El-Bahr Mosque

- Amr ibn al-As Mosque (Damietta), the second mosque to be built in Egypt and Africa by the Arabs after entering Egypt. It was twice converted to a church during the city's occupation by the Crusaders. Louis IX of France's son, John Tristan, was baptized by a legate of the pope in this mosque.
- Al-Bahr Mosque, dating to the Ottoman rule era.
- Al-Hadidy Mosque in Faraskour, 200 years old.
- Al-Maainy Mosque, dating to the reign of al-Naser Mohammed ibn Qalawon.
- Al-Matbuly Mosque, dating to the Mamluk era.
- Al-Radwaniya Mosque, dating to the Mamluk era.

== Notable people ==
- Jamal al-Din Saoji, Persian Sufi saint and ascetic
- Aisha Abd al-Rahman, Egyptian author
- Kamal al-Din Muhammad ibn Musa Al-Damiri, (1344–1405), writer on canon law and natural history
- Refaat Al-Gammal (Raafat el-Haggan), Egyptian spy
- Latifa al-Zayyat, activist and writer
- Professor Abdel Rahman Badawi, professor of philosophy
- St. Sidhom Bishay, Coptic martyr
- Rifaat El-Fanagily, football player
- Mohamed Fahim ElGindy, who established and developed the furniture industry during 20th century in Damietta
- Rifaat el-Mahgoub, former Head of the Egyptian Parliament and a member of the ruling National Democratic Party
- Besheer El-Tabei, football player
- Mohammed Hassan El-Zayyat, former minister of foreign affairs.
- Farag Foda, secular writer shot to death in his office on 8 June 1992 by two Islamic fundamentalists from the Al-Gama'a al-Islamiyya group.
- Zahi Hawass, Egyptologist
- Yusuf Idris, writer and psychiatrist
- Zaki Naguib Mahmoud, writer and philosopher
- Ali Moustafa Mosharafa, physicist and contributor to the theory of relativity
- Farouk Shousha, poet; previously head of Egyptian Radio (El Soaraa village)
- Essam El Hadary, football player

== See also ==
- Damiaatjes
- Caphutkia ancient name of Damietta in Aramaic and Jewish literature.
- Sheremsah
- Caphtor
- Damietta toad
- Domiati
- List of cities and towns in Egypt

== Works cited ==
=== Books ===
- Ashtor, Eliyahu (2014). Levant Trade in the Middle Ages. Princeton University Press. ISBN 9781400853168.
- Baedeker, Karl (1885). Egypt: Handbook For Travellers Part First: Lower Egypt, With the Fayum and the Peninsula of Sinai (2 ed.). Baedeker.
- Budge, E. (1911). Cook's Handbook For Egypt and the Egyptian Sudan (3 ed.). Thomas Cook & Son.
- Chalcraft, John (2012). The Striking Cabbies of Cairo and Other Stories: Crafts and Guilds in Egypt, 1863-1914. SUNY Press. ISBN 9780791484814.
- Cohen, Mark (2014). Jewish Self-Government in Medieval Egypt: The Origins of the Office of the Head of the Jews, ca. 1065-1126. Princeton University Press. ISBN 9781400853588.
- Cole, Juan (1992). Colonialism and Revolution in the Middle East: Social and Cultural Origins of Egypt's Urabi Movement. Princeton University Press. ISBN 9781400820900.
- Cooper, J. (2018). Encyclopaedia of Islam Three Online. Brill Publishers. ISBN 9004082654.
- Eckstein, Zvi; Botticini, Maristella (2012). The Chosen Few: How Education Shaped Jewish History, 70-1492. Princeton University Press. ISBN 9781400842483.
- Ephrat, Daphna (2021). Sufi Masters and the Creation of Saintly Spheres in Medieval Syria. Princeton University Press. ISBN 9781641892094.
- Haas, Christopher (1997). Alexandria in Late Antiquity: Topography and Social Conflict. Johns Hopkins University Press. ISBN 080185377X.
- Hanna, Nelly (2025). Empires in Friction: Egypt in the Sixteenth Century. Syracuse University Press. ISBN 9780815657262.
- Herbermann, Charles (1907). Catholic Encyclopedia. Robert Appleton Company.
- Houtsma, M.; Arnold, T.; Basset, R.; Hartmann, R., eds. (1987). E.J. Brill's First Encyclopaedia of Islam 1913-1936. Vol. 2. Brill Publishers. ISBN 9004082654.
- Lewis, B.; Pellat, Charles; Schacht, J., eds. (1991). The Encyclopedia of Islam. Vol. 2. Brill Publishers. ISBN 9004070265.
- Peust, Carsten (2010). Die Toponyme vorarabischen Ursprungs im modernen Ägypten (PDF). Göttinger Miszellen.
- Shaw, Stanford (1962). The Financial and Administrative Organization and Development of Ottoman Egypt 1517-1798. Princeton University Press. ISBN 9781400877461.
- Tignor, Robert (2017). State, Private Enterprise and Economic Change in Egypt, 1918-1952. Princeton University Press. ISBN 9781400886609.

=== Journals ===
- de Lara, Juan; Cabrera-Lafuente, Ana (2025). "The Pegasus Cloth: Unveiling a Masterpiece from the Abbasid Caliphate". The Textile Museum Journal. 52. University of Texas Press: 152–175.
- Ehrenkreutz, A. (1955). "The Place of Saladin in the Naval History of the Mediterranean Sea in the Middle Ages". Journal of the American Oriental Society. 75 (2). American Society For Premodern Asia: 100–116. doi:10.2307/595012. JSTOR 595012.
- Muhammad, Samir (2022). "وُلاةُ ثغرِ دِمياط ونُوّابُها في دولة المماليک "دراسة في النظم الإدارية". History and the Future. 36 (71). Minya University: 277–352. doi:10.21608/hfj.2022.127484.1050.
- Ridgeon, Lloyd (2022). "A Study of a Medieval Persian Hagiography and Interactions Between Sufis and Christians in Rum and Upper Mesopotamia". The Maghreb Review. 47 (3). Maghreb Publications: 235–259.
- Roded, Ruth (2022). "Muslim and Jewish Female Religious Trailblazers". Nashim: A Journal of Jewish Women's Studies & Gender Issues. 41. Indiana University Press: 64–91.
- Rose, Christopher (2023). "Trial by Virus: Colonial Medicine and the 1883 Cholera in Egypt". Journal of Colonialism and Colonial History. 24 (1). Johns Hopkins University Press: 1–24.
