= Damietta Port =

Coordinates: 31°28′01″N 31°46′05″E

Port of Damietta
- Interactive map of Port of Damietta
- Location within Egypt

Location
- Country: Egypt
- Location: Damietta

Details
- Operated by: Damietta Port Authority
- Owned by: Government of Egypt
- Type of Harbor: Natural deepwater seaport
- Land area: 279 hectares
- No. of berths: 24

Damietta Port is located on the northern coast of Egypt, 10 km (6.2 mi) west of the Nile River of Damietta branch westward Ras El-Barr, 70 km to the west of Port Said, and 200 km (120 mi) from Alexandria Port. The port installations extend on an area of 11.8 km^{2} (4.6 sq mi). The port is bordered by an imaginary line connecting the eastern and western external breakwaters.

== Geography ==
=== Entrance Channel ===
The Entrance Channel is 11.4 km long, 15m deep, and 300m wide decreasingly reaching 250m at the breakwater fringe, the approach channel is bordered by 18 nightly-lit buoys.

=== Breakwaters ===
The western breakwater is 1640m long with 140m land-based and 1500m sea-based area.
The eastern breakwater is 738m long with 200m land-based and 538m sea-based area.
Both breakwaters are made of stacked artificial acropod piles topped with a concrete head.

=== Barge Channel ===
The barge channel consists of two sections; one is 1350m long connecting the barge dock to the sea and the other is 3750m connecting the dock to the Nile estuary.
Turning Dock The turning dock diameter is 500m with 14.5m depth at the container berth, and 12m depth at the general cargo berth.

== See also ==
- Damietta
- Transportation in Egypt
