= Jamal al-Din Saoji =

Founder of Qalandariya order

- سيد جمال مجرد ساوجى

Personal life
- Born: Savah (Sawah), near Tehran, Persia
- Died: c. 1232–1233 CE Damietta, Egypt
- Resting place: Damietta
- Region: Persia, Syria, Egypt

Religious life
- Religion: Islam
- Order: Qalandariyya

Senior posting
- Disciples: Muhammad Balkhi, Abu Bakr Isfahani, Jalal Darguzini
- Influenced: Ibrahim Mujarrad, Lal Shahbaz Qalandar, Baba Fakruddin

Jamal al-Din Saoji (Persian: جمال الدین ساوجى), also known as Jamaluddin Sawochi or Jamaluddin Savi, (d. c. 1232–33 CE) was a Persian Sufi saint and ascetic, widely recognized as the founder and master of the Qalandariyya order. He is remembered for his radical renunciation of worldly life, his symbolic practices of self-denial, and for shaping the Qalandari movement that later spread across the Middle East, South Asia, and Anatolia. He is also revered as a grand spiritual master of Lal Shahbaz Qalandar of Sehwan Sharif (Pakistan) through his disciple Hazrat Ibrahim Mujarrad.

== Early life and education ==
Jamal al-Din was born in Savah, near present-day Tehran, in the late 12th century. He reportedly studied the Islamic sciences in his youth and earned a reputation as a brilliant jurist, remembered in later Chishti tradition as a "walking library" (kutub khana-yi sayyar).

== Turn to asceticism ==
After traveling to Damascus, Jamal al-Din became associated with the hospice of ‘Uthman Rumi. His spiritual transformation is attributed to an encounter with the radical ascetic Jalal Darguzini, which inspired him to abandon scholarship and embrace an uncompromising path of faqr (poverty) and renunciation.

He withdrew to cemeteries, practiced silence, lived on nature, and adopted the practice of complete shaving of hair, beard, moustache, and eyebrows, which became the hallmark of the Qalandari dervishes.

== Teachings and practices ==
- Poverty (faqr): Jamal al-Din preached radical poverty as the highest spiritual state, earning the epithet "king of poverty."
- Hair Shaving Ritual: According to Khaja Khan’s Studies in Tasawwuf, the shaving of eyebrows in Sufi initiation originated with Jamaluddin Sawochi. The practice symbolized the removal of ignorance, pride, and selfishness, drawing on the Qur’anic verse: "Am I not your Lord? They said, 'Yes'" (Qur’an 7:172).

This ritual of eyebrow shaving continues in South India at the shrine of Baba Fakhruddin of Penukonda, where initiation of faqirs in orders associated with the shrine is performed. The chief seat (Sadar Chowk) of these orders in the Madras Presidency was located at the shrine.

- "Die before you die": He emphasized the Prophetic saying mutu qabla an tamutu ("die before you die"), teaching that true spiritual life required symbolic death to worldly attachments.
- Antinomianism: His disciples often rejected conventional ritual observance, emphasized ecstatic practices, and engaged in radical forms of renunciation.

== Disciples and influence ==
Although personally inclined to solitude, Jamal al-Din attracted several disciples, including Muhammad Balkhi, Abu Bakr Isfahani, and Jalal Darguzini. Through his spiritual lineage, he became a grand master of Lal Shahbaz Qalandar (d. 1274), the celebrated saint of Sehwan Sharif, via Hazrat Ibrahim Mujarrad.

== Later life and death ==
Jamal al-Din later moved to Damietta, Egypt, where he lived in a cemetery. A famous account relates that he performed a "beard miracle" before the town’s magistrate—causing a beard to grow, whiten, and disappear at will—which led to the establishment of a hospice in his honor. He died in Damietta around 1232–33 CE, where a zawiyah (dervish hospice) was built at his tomb.

== Account by Ibn Battuta ==
The Moroccan traveller Ibn Battuta, who visited Egypt in the 14th century, mentioned Jamal al-Din al-Sawi in his Rihla. He recorded that in Damietta was "the cell of the Sheikh Jamal Oddin El Sawi, leader of the sect called Karenders (Qalandars). These are they who shave their chins and eyebrows."

Ibn Battuta relates a story about the origin of the Sheikh’s distinctive practice of shaving the beard and eyebrows. According to this account, a woman from Sawah fell in love with him and tried to entrap him. To repel her advances, Jamal al-Din shaved off his beard and eyebrows, preserving his chastity. Thereafter, he and his followers retained this appearance as a mark of renunciation.

He also describes a miraculous episode in Damietta in which Jamal al-Din demonstrated the ability to manifest and change the color of his beard before the town’s judge, Ibn Omaid. After witnessing this wonder, the judge became his disciple, built him a cell (zawiya), and requested to be buried at its doorway so that all who visited the saint’s tomb would pass over his own grave.

== Legacy ==
- Jamal al-Din is credited as the first master of the Qalandariyya, which spread to Syria, Egypt, Iran, India, and Anatolia.
- His radical ascetic practices, particularly ritual shaving, became defining symbols of Qalandari identity.
- His influence extended to South India, where his eyebrow-shaving initiation practice continues at the shrine of Baba Fakhruddin, the Sadar Chowk of faqiri orders in the Madras Presidency.
- He is revered in South Asia as part of the spiritual genealogy of Lal Shahbaz Qalandar.

== See also ==
- Qalandariyya
- Lal Shahbaz Qalandar
- Baba Fakruddin
- Ibrahim Mujarrad
