= Henri-Marcel Magne =

Henri-Marcel-Urbain Magne (11 October 1877 - 1 July 1944) was a French painter and designer.

== Life ==
He was born in Paris to Lucien Magne, making him grandson of Auguste-Joseph Magne and great-grandson of Pierre Magne, all three of whom were architects. Henri-Marcel studied architecture at the Beaux-Arts de Paris before training in painting in the studios of Luc-Olivier Merson, Albert Maignan and Alfred de Richemont (1857-1911).

He then turned to monumental decoration, allowing him to combine painting and architecture. He produced wall paintings, cartoons and maquettes for stained glass windows in secular and religious buildings. He was one of the master-cartoon-makers for Charles Lorin's glass workshop in Chartres.

Thanks to friendships and professional relationships with the chief architects for monuments historiques, he was able to work on monuments historiques in Île-de-France and Marne. When his father was made architect of Sacré-Cœur de Montmartre in 1905, Henri-Marcel Magne and his brother René Magne worked in their father's architecture studio on Rue de l'Oratoire in Paris. He was made professor of applied arts at the Conservatoire national des arts et métiers from 1919 until his death in Champagne-sur-Seine. He is buried in Eaubonne cemetery.

== Selected works ==
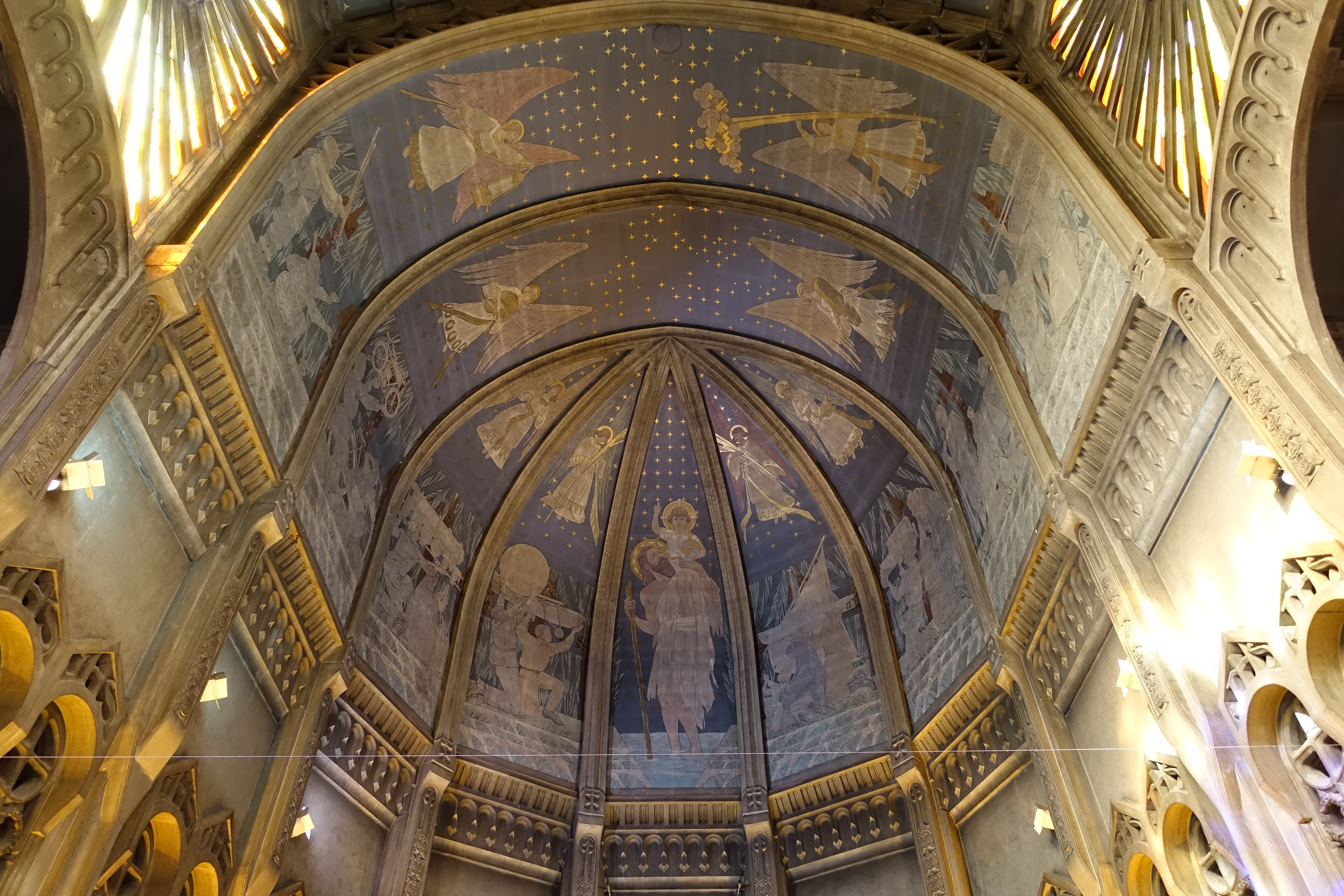
Saint Christopher, vault of the choir of Saint-Christophe-de-Javel church in Paris.

- Paris:
  - Sacré-Cœur, decorations, cartoons for :
    - stained glass windows for galleries, rose windows, five ambulatory chapels and Lady Chapel, all destroyed by bombing in 1944 ;
    - Assumption of the Virgin, 1907, dome mosaic in the Lady Chapel ;
    - Michael the Archangel Ordering Saint Aubert to build an abbey on Mont-Tombe, 1909, mosaic in the St Michael chapel ;
    - Triumph of the Sacred Heart, mosaic on the choir semi-dome - Merson was commissioned for its iconographic programme (defined in December 1911 and fixed in 1917), with Magne producing studies and cartoons for him and completing the work after Merson's death in 1920, assisted by Marcel Imbs, who was tasked with interpreting the cartoons Merson had left. The mosaics were completed by the maison René Martin de Saint-Denis from 1918 onwards, the scaffolding was begun on 3 October 1921, the mosaic started to be put in place on 1 February 1922 and the last piece was put in place on 30 April 1923.
  - église Notre-Dame-du-Rosaire, decorations:
    - Education of the Virgin Mary, 1913, triptych of Saint Anne, restored in the 1990s ;
    - Stations of the Cross, restored in the 1990s ;
    - Rose window.
  - église Saint-Christophe-de-Javel : saint Christopher surrounded by travellers imploring his protection and presenting their modern modes of transport (a plane, a balloon, a train, a steamboat, a car), wall painting of the choir vault
  - musée d'Orsay : The Architect, c. 1910, oil on canvas

== Publications ==
- L'Art appliqué aux métiers whose publication was begun by Lucien Magne in 1913 and completed by Henri-Marcel Magne in 1933.

== Exhibitions ==
- 1928 and 1929 : Lap exhibition in the gardens of the maison Séailles in Antony.
