= Mohamed Fahim ElGindy =

- Born: 1872; Damietta, Egypt
- Died: 29 April 1959 (aged 86–87); Cairo, Egypt
- Years active: c. 1900s–1959

Mohamed Fahim AlSayed Abdullah Ahmed El Guindy (1875-1959) was an Egyptian furniture designer, whose work spanned the development of Modernism. He established the furniture industry in Damietta.

== Personal life ==
Mohamed was an Egyptian born to Turkish parents. His family belongs to one of the several branches of the El Guindy family across the Middle East, a family that has several branches in Hijaz, Yemen, Egypt, Syria, Lebanon, Turkey, and are said to be Nobles of Ali ibn Abi Talib. Mohamed's family were Silk traders; however rebellious Mohamed decided to dedicate his life to his art and furniture making, becoming a pioneer in the Egyptian industry. Mohamed died on 29 April 1959 in Cairo.

== Achievements ==
Mohamed was known as Fahim ElGindy. He was the man who established and developed the industry of furniture during the 20th century in Damietta and Egypt. In 1926, he earned the Kingdom Golden Prize from the Conference of Industrial and Agriculture of Fabricating the Furniture in Cairo. He was the first Arab who was awarded Diplomas and golden medals from Rome and Paris in 1926.

Mohamed was a pioneer in establishing the furniture Industry. He established two furniture centres, in Damietta (1910) and Cairo (1920). During the second Conference of Furniture Industry in Damietta in 1986, the Egyptian government appropriated his efforts by providing a certificate to his name.

== Certificates ==
1.Certificate of "Diploma Di Grand Premio E Medaglia D'Oro per Fabrique Demeubles" in 1926 from "ESPOSIZIONE FIERA Campioni Della Prodvzione Italiana Ed Internazionalie " .

2.Certificate of "Diplóme Grand Prix avec Medaille" in 1926 from "Paris Exposition D'Economie Domestique" .

3.Certificate of "Golden Medal" in 1926 from "Société Royale D'Agriculture Exposition Agricole Et Industierlle Du Caire" .
