= Amr ibn al-As Mosque (Damietta) =

2nd oldest mosque in Egypt

- مَسْجِد عَمْرِو بْنِ الْعَاصِ
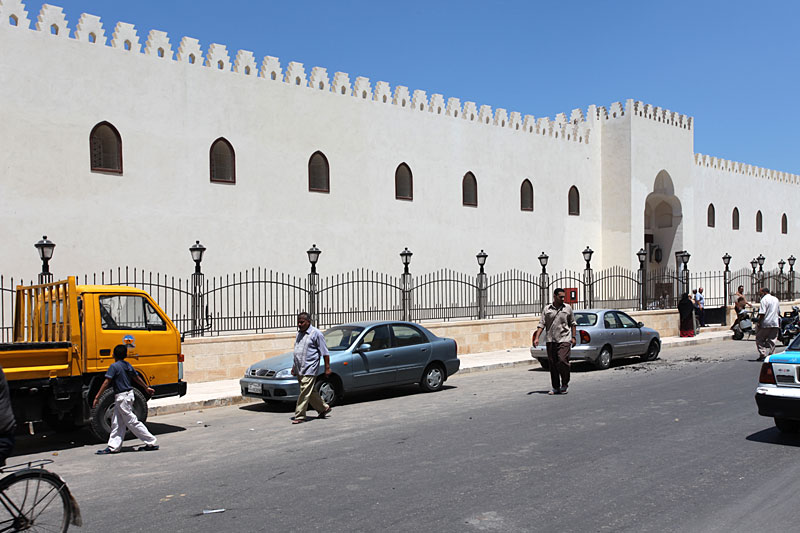
- The western facade of the Amr ibn al-As mosque as seen from Al Jabana Street

Religion
- Affiliation: Sunni Islam
- Ecclesiastical or organizational status: Mosque
- Status: Active

Location
- Location: Damietta
- Country: Egypt
- Interactive map of Amr ibn al-As Mosque
- Coordinates: 31°25′22″N 31°49′05″E

Architecture
- Type: Mosque
- Established: c. 642 CE (uncertain)
- Site area: 3,420 m^{2} (36,800 sq ft)
- Other name(s): Al-Fateh Mosque; Cathedral of the Holy Virgin

The Amr ibn al-As Mosque (Arabic: مَسْجِد عَمْرِو بْنِ الْعَاصِ, romanized: Masjid ʿAmr ibn al-ʿĀṣ), also known as the Abu'l-Ma'ati Mosque, and as the Al-Fateh Mosque, is a mosque in Damietta, Egypt. According to some local sources, it is the second mosque built in Egypt, named for Amr ibn al-As, one of the Companions of the Prophet who led the Arab conquest of Egypt. It was temporarily the Cathedral of the Holy Virgin during the Crusader occupation of Damietta.

== History ==
The Arabs under the Rashidun Caliphate successfully conquered Egypt in 642. Miqdad ibn Aswad is said to have built a mosque in Damietta, incorporating older Roman-period columns into the structure. Bernard O'Kane, professor of Islamic architecture at the American University in Cairo, has expressed doubt that the present-day mosque corresponds to this original mosque.

Damietta was attacked by the Byzantines during the reign of Abbasid Caliph Al-Mutawakkil. The mosque was attacked with fire and burnt, but eventually rebuilt after the attacks had been repelled.

The mosque was renovated during the Fatimid rule in 1106. The structure was expanded to accommodate more worshippers as well.

=== Crusades ===
After the siege of Damietta in 1218–1219, the Crusaders under John of Brienne occupied Damietta. The mosque was converted into a cathedral. On 2 February 1220, the Feast of the Purification, Cardinal Pelagius renamed the mosque to the Cathedral of the Holy Virgin. However, the Crusaders were defeated during the Fifth Crusade, so they surrendered and left Damietta in 1221. The mosque was restored to its original function in the same year.

In June 1249, the army of the Seventh Crusade besieged Damietta under Louis IX of France. The mosque was again converted into a cathedral where religious ceremonies were held. In 1250, Louis's son John Tristan was baptized in the cathedral. However, the Crusaders lost the Battle of Fariskur which resulted in Louis IX being captured and held hostage. Louis was forced to cede Damietta back to the Ayyubids, and the cathedral was abandoned.

=== Mamluk period ===
On the orders of the new Mamluk sultan, Aybak, Damietta was demolished in 1251 to prevent the Crusaders from using it again in the future. A new city was created further south. However, the Mamluks kept the cathedral and reconverted it into a mosque. The mosque was given a wooden minbar that was completed in 1369 and crafted by a woodworker named Ahmad ibn Yusuf.

=== Modern era ===
The mosque was neglected for decades, until the year 2004 when plans were made to restore it. The original structure was completely ruined and the new building is a reconstruction. The works were done by The Arab Contractors, and it took five years to complete. On 8 May 2009, the mosque was reopened to the public. The opening day coincided with the day Louis IX and his Crusaders left Damietta, returning it to the Muslims.

== Architecture ==
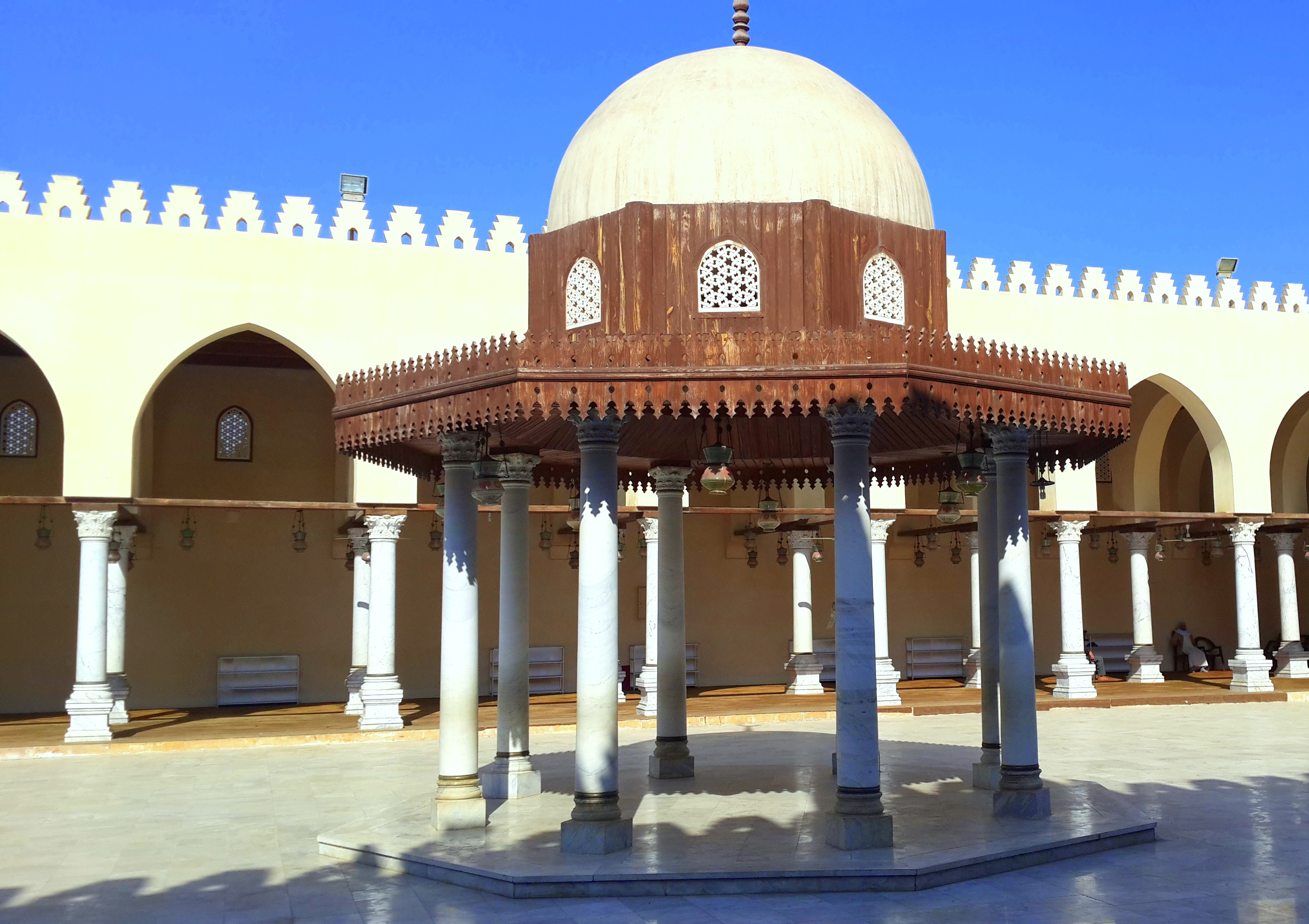
The domed ablution fountain in the mosque's courtyard

The Amr ibn al-As mosque of Damietta is built in a similar way to the one in Fustat. It has a courtyard in the center which holds a domed ablution fountain. On the western side is the main entrance to the mosque, overlooking Al Jabana Street. Next to the entrance is a square room, formerly the base of a minaret which was destroyed during an earthquake. The mosque's area totals up to 3420 square metres, making it one of the largest mosques in Egypt.

== Gallery ==
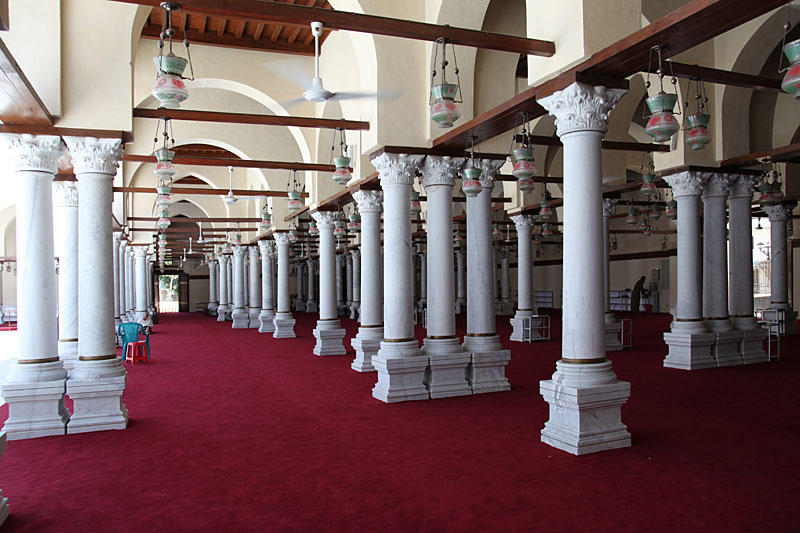
The mosque prayer hall

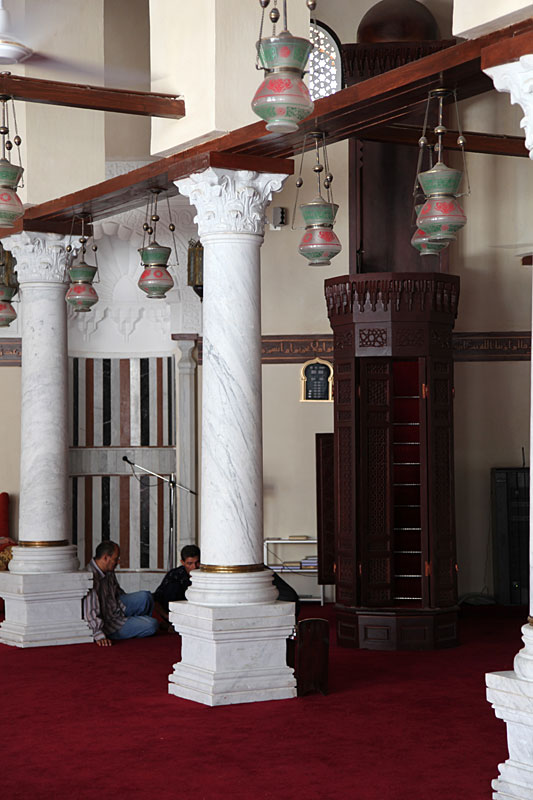
Mihrab (left) and wooden minbar

== See also ==
- Amr ibn al-As Mosque (Fustat)
- Islam in Egypt
- List of mosques in Egypt
