= Lucien Magne =

French architect (1849–1916)

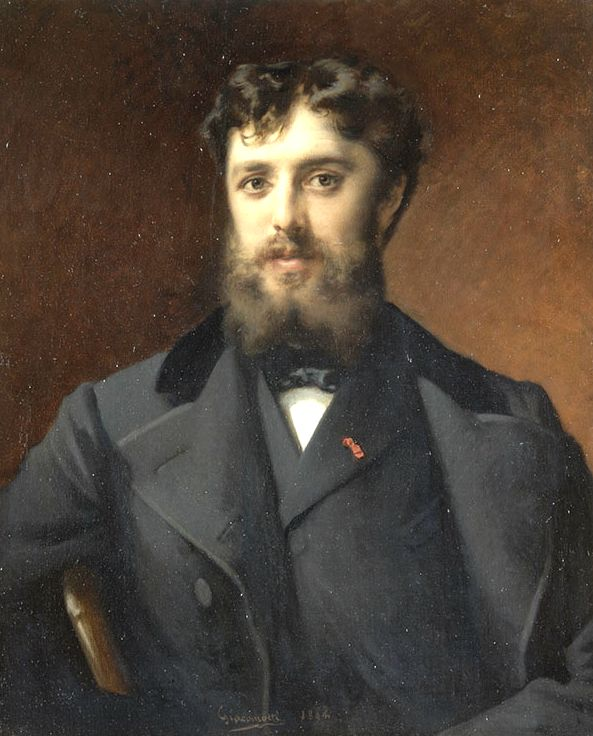
- Lucien Magne
- Born: 27 December 1849; Paris, France
- Died: 25 July 1916 (aged 66); Eaubonne, Val d'Oise, France
- Occupation: Architect
- Employer: Conservatoire national des arts et métiers

Lucien Magne (27 December 1849 – 25 July 1916) was a French architect specialising in religious buildings.

He took a large part in the completion of the Basilica of the Sacred Heart of Montmartre on the death of Paul Abadie (1884). He created the stained glass museum of the Trocadéro.

From 1899 until his death he is teacher at the Conservatoire national des arts et métiers.
