= 1221 =

1221 in various calendars
- Gregorian calendar: 1221; MCCXXI
- Ab urbe condita: 1974
- Armenian calendar: 670; ԹՎ ՈՀ
- Assyrian calendar: 5971
- Balinese saka calendar: 1142–1143
- Bengali calendar: 627–628
- Berber calendar: 2171
- English Regnal year: 5 Hen. 3 – 6 Hen. 3
- Buddhist calendar: 1765
- Burmese calendar: 583
- Byzantine calendar: 6729–6730
- Chinese calendar: 庚辰年 (Metal Dragon); 3918 or 3711 — to — 辛巳年 (Metal Snake); 3919 or 3712
- Coptic calendar: 937–938
- Discordian calendar: 2387
- Ethiopian calendar: 1213–1214
- Hebrew calendar: 4981–4982
- Hindu calendars
- Vikram Samvat: 1277–1278
- Shaka Samvat: 1142–1143
- Kali Yuga: 4321–4322
- Holocene calendar: 11221
- Igbo calendar: 221–222
- Iranian calendar: 599–600
- Islamic calendar: 617–618
- Japanese calendar: Jōkyū 3 (承久３年)
- Javanese calendar: 1129–1130
- Julian calendar: 1221; MCCXXI
- Korean calendar: 3554
- Minguo calendar: 691 before ROC 民前691年
- Nanakshahi calendar: −247
- Thai solar calendar: 1763–1764
- Tibetan calendar: ལྕགས་ཕོ་འབྲུག་ལོ་ (male Iron-Dragon); 1347 or 966 or 194 — to — ལྕགས་མོ་སྦྲུལ་ལོ་ (female Iron-Snake); 1348 or 967 or 195

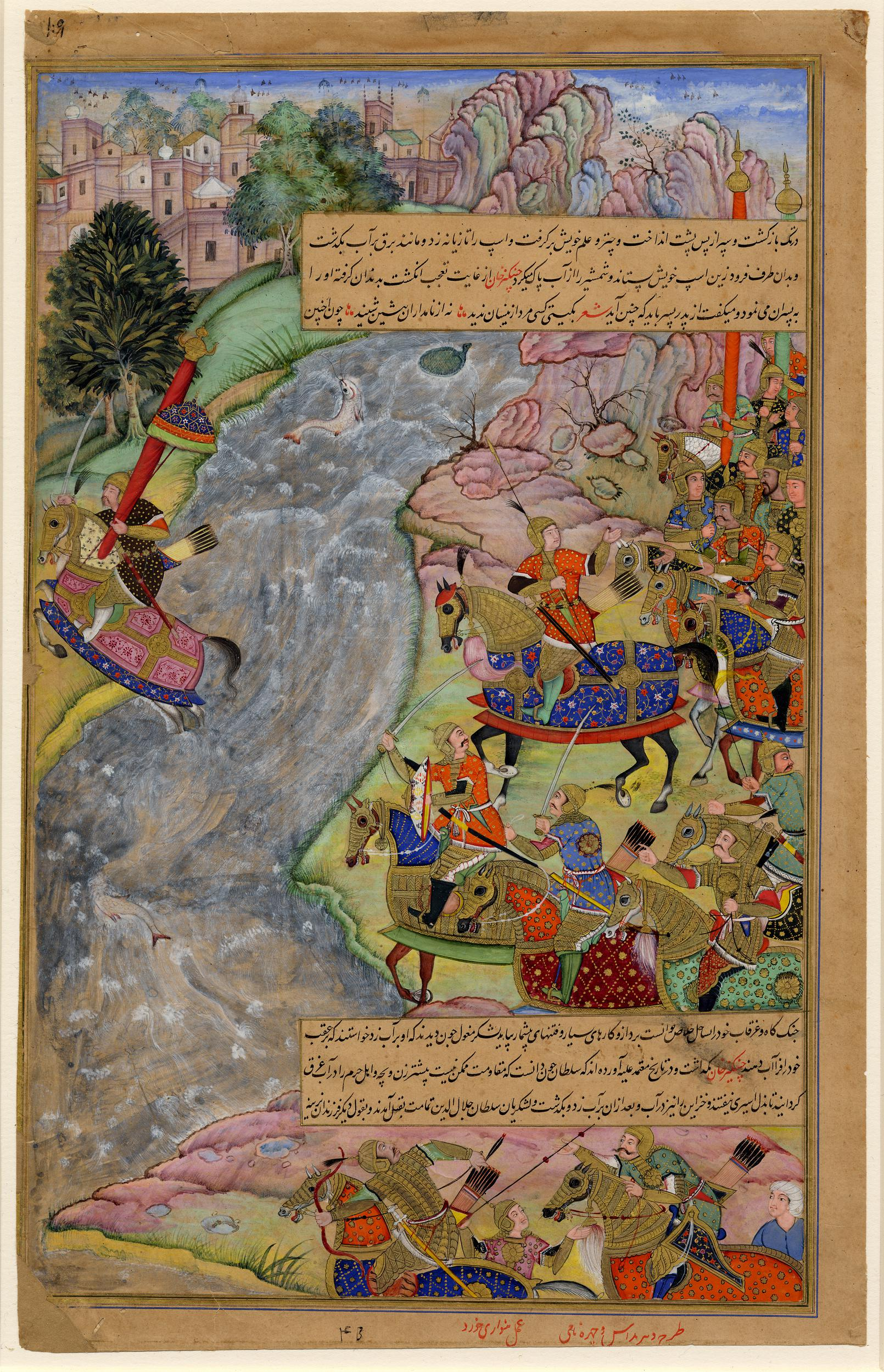
Jalal al-Din Mangburni (left) crosses the Indus River and escapes Genghis Khan.

Year 1221 (MCCXXI) was a common year starting on Friday of the Julian calendar.

== Events ==
=== By place ===
==== Byzantine Empire ====
- November – Emperor Theodore I Laskaris dies after a 16-year reign and is succeeded by his son-in-law John III Doukas Vatatzes. John fends off Theodore's brothers, who believe that they have the better claim for the throne of the Empire of Nicaea. In December, he becomes the sole ruler, and during his reign, the Empire becomes the most powerful of the Byzantine successor states and the frontrunner in the race to recover Constantinople from the Latin Empire. John also cultivates a close relationship with Frederick II, Holy Roman Emperor, and negotiates with Pope Honorius III about the possibility of reuniting the Church.

==== Fifth Crusade ====
- June – Sultan Al-Kamil again offers peace terms to Cardinal Pelagius with the cession of Jerusalem and all Palestine apart from Oultrejordain, together with a 30 years' truce and money compensation for the dismantling of Jerusalem. Meanwhile, a German contingent under Louis I of Bavaria arrives at Damietta, with orders from Frederick II not to launch an attack on Cairo until the emperor's arrival. Louis and Pelagius decide to advance into Egypt towards Mansoura, where Al-Kamil has built a fortress to protect Cairo. The Crusaders assemble their armies and tents are set up just up the Nile, on June 29.
- July 4 – Pelagius orders a three-days fast in preparation for the advance. King John I of Jerusalem arrives at Damietta to rejoin the Crusade at the command of Honorius III. The Crusader force moves towards Sheremsah, halfway between Faraskur and Mansoura on the east bank of the Nile, occupying the city on July 12. Sources tell of 630 ships of various sizes, 5,000 knights, 4,000 archers, and 40,000 men. A horde of pilgrims march with the army. They are ordered to keep close to the river, to supply the Crusaders with water. Pelagius plans a new offensive and leaves a large garrison at Damietta.
- July 24 – Pelagius moves the Crusader forces near Ashmun al-Rumman, on the opposite bank from Mansoura. Queen-Regent Alice of Cyprus and leaders of the military orders warn Pelagius of a large Muslim army being formed in Syria. Meanwhile, the Egyptian army under Al-Kamil crosses the Nile near Lake Manzaleh and establishes themselves between the Crusader camp and Damietta. In the Ushmum canal at Sheremsah, Al-Kamil's ships sail down the Nile and block the Crusaders' line of communications to Damietta. In August, Pelagius orders a retreat, but the route is cut off by Egyptians.
- August 26–28 – Battle of Mansoura: The Crusader army led by Pelagius and John I of Jerusalem is defeated by the Egyptian forces at Mansoura. John and the military orders fight a last stand on the river banks of the Nile. He beats off a Nubian assault (supported by elite Turkish cavalry) and drives them back, but only after thousands of soldiers have perished. The remaining Crusaders are surrounded by Al-Kamil's forces and begin a desperate retreat to Damietta. The city is well-garrisoned and supplied with arms; a naval squadron under Henry, Count of Malta ("Enrico Pescatore") defends the harbour against the Egyptians. The Crusaders retreat under cover of darkness. Many of the soldiers cannot bear to abandon their stores of wine, and drink them all rather than leave them. The Teutonic Knights set fire to the stores that they cannot carry, thus informing the Egyptians that they are abandoning their positions. In the meantime, Al-Kamil orders opening of the sluices along the right bank of the Nile, flooding the area. Pelagius on his ship is carried by the floodwaters past the blockading Egyptian fleet. Other ships, carrying the medical supplies of the army and much of its food, escape, but many are captured.
- August 28 – Pelagius sues for peace and sends an envoy to Al-Kamil. The terms of surrender are accepted, which includes the retreat from Damietta – leaving Egypt with the remnants of the Crusader army and an 8-year truce. After prisoners are exchanged, Al-Kamil enters Damietta on September 8. The Fifth Crusade ends with nothing gained for the West, with much lost, men, resources and reputations. The Crusaders blame Frederick II for not being there. Pelagius is accused of ineffectual leadership and a misguided view, which has led to rejecting the sultan's peace offerings.

==== Mongol Empire ====
- Spring – Genghis Khan orders an armed reconnaissance expedition into the Caucasus (consisting of Georgia and Armenia) under the command of Subutai and Jebe ("the Arrow"). The Mongols defeat two Georgian armies around Tbilisi, but lack the will or equipment to besiege the capital city. During the fighting, King George IV of Georgia himself is severely wounded and his elite knights are massacred. Meanwhile in Bamyan, the ruler Genghis Khan leads a Mongol force that besieges and captures the fortified city after fierce resistance; during the fighting, his grandson Mutukan is killed, prompting a brutal massacre of the city’s defenders. The Mongols then return to Azerbaijan and Persia, and burn and pillage a few more cities.
- February – The cities of Merv (perhaps the world's largest up to this date), Herat and Nishapur which have peacefully surrendered rise up in arms. Genghis Khan sends his son Tolui to spend an extra month to subdue the revolts. Contemporary scholars report over a million people are systematically killed in a genocide.
- September – Battle of Parwan: Sultan Jalal al-Din Mangburni recruits an army of Turkic and Afghan warriors numbering some 60,000 men. As soon as news of this reaches Genghis Khan he sends a Mongol army of 30,000 men, led by his stepbrother Shigi Qutuqu. Meanwhile, Jalal al-Din moves to Parwan (modern Afghanistan), where the two armies meet in a narrow valley. Jalal al-Din takes the initiative, ordering his right-wing of Turks to dismount and engage in a skirmish. On the third day, the Mongols are finally defeated by the Khwarezmian forces and are forced to retreat. Shigi Qutuzu is driven off in defeat, losing over half his army.
- October – The Mongol army raids Georgia for the second time, and Subutai and Jebe allow their forces to pass through the Caucasus Mountains.
- November 24 – Battle of the Indus: Left with some 20,000 men, Jalal al-Din Mangburni has headed for the Indus River where Genghis catches up with him. In a desperate battle the Khwarezmain forces are destroyed, completing the Mongol conquest of the Khwarazmian Empire, while Jalal al-Din flees across the river and escapes into India.

==== Europe ====
- June 16 – The Jewish population of Erfurt (Duchy of Thuringia) is massacred after a ritual murder libel. A crowd storms the synagogue where the Jews have gathered with the threat of baptism or death. The Jewish quarter, including the synagogue, is razed: many Jews are tortured and killed.
- Siege of Tallinn: An Estonian Crusader army tries to conquer the Danish stronghold of Tallinn with the help of Revalians, Harrians and Vironians. They besiege the stronghold for 14 days but finally retreat their forces.

==== Britain ====
- June 21 – 10-year-old Joan of England, eldest daughter of the late King John, marries the 21-year-old King Alexander II of Scotland at York Minster.

==== Asia ====
- May 13 – Emperor Juntoku is forced to abdicate, and is briefly succeeded by his 2-year-old son Chūkyō on the throne of Japan. Ex-Emperor Go-Toba leads the unsuccessful Jōkyū War against the Kamakura shogunate.
- July 29 – The 9-year-old Go-Horikawa ascends to the Chrysanthemum Throne at the Kyoto Imperial Palace in Japan. He is a grandson of the late Emperor Takakura and a nephew of the exiled Go-Toba.

==== Mesoamerica ====
- The Maya of the Yucatán revolt against the rulers of Chichen Itza.

== Births ==
- May 13 – Alexander Nevsky, Kievan Grand Prince (d. 1263)
- June 4 – Przemysł I, Polish nobleman and knight (d. 1257)
- October 9 – Salimbene di Adam, Italian chronicler (d. 1290)
- November 2 – Saif al-Din Qutuz, Egyptian military leader (d. 1260)
- November 23 – Alfonso X ("the Wise"), king of Castile (d. 1284)
- Barisone III, Sardinian judge of Logudoro (or Torres) (d. 1236)
- Bonaventure, Italian theologian and philosopher (d. 1274)
- Hugh XI of Lusignan, French nobleman and knight (d. 1250)
- Margaret of Provence, queen consort of France (d. 1295)
- Nisshō, Japanese Buddhist priest and teacher (d. 1323)
- Theobald II, Count of Bar, French nobleman and knight (d. 1291)
- Walter Devereux, Anglo-Norman nobleman and knight (d. 1292)
- William Mauduit, 8th Earl of Warwick, English nobleman and knight (d. 1268)

== Deaths ==
- January 17 – Walter de Clifford, English nobleman (b. 1160)
- February 18 – Theodoric I, Margrave of Meissen (b. 1162)
- March 26 – Raoul de Neuville, French bishop and diplomat
- March 27 – Berengaria of Portugal, queen consort of Denmark (b. 1198)
- April 25 – Baruch ben Samuel of Mainz, German rabbi
- Spring – Mutukan commander of Mongol Empire
- July 7 – Peter of Cornwall, English priest and writer (b. 1140)
- August 6 – Dominic, founder of the Dominican Order, canonized (b. 1170)
- September 15 – Geoffrey of Rohan, French nobleman (b. 1190)
- October 4 – William IV of Ponthieu (Talvas), Norman nobleman (b. 1179)
- October 21 – Alix, Duchess of Brittany (or Alis), Breton noblewoman (b. 1200)
- October 31 – Ulrich II, Bishop of Passau, German abbot and prince-bishop
- November – Theodore I Laskaris, emperor of Nicaea (b. 1175)
- December – Roger of San Severino, archbishop of Benevento
- Adam of Perseigne, French Cistercian abbot (b. 1145)
- Albertet de Sestaro, French jongleur and troubadour
- Asukai Masatsune, Japanese waka poet and writer
- Lalibela (Gebre Meskel), ruler of the Ethiopian Empire (b. 1162)
- Hassan III of Alamut, ruler of the Nizari Ismaili state (b. 1187)
- Henry I of Rodez, French nobleman and troubadour
- John of Tynemouth, English priest, archdeacon and lawyer
- Najmuddin Kubra, Khwarezmian philosopher (b. 1145)
- Roger Bigod, 2nd Earl of Norfolk, English nobleman and knight (b. 1144)
- Walter de Lindsay of Lamberton, Scottish nobleman and knight
