= Battle of Mansurah (1221) =

Battle in Egypt

- Part of the Crusades
Date	26–28 August 1221
Location	Mansoura, Egypt
Result	Ayyubid victory

Belligerents
Holy Roman Empire; Kingdom of Sicily • Duchy of Apulia; Republic of Genoa; Republic of Pisa; Republic of Venice; Papal States; Kingdom of France; Kingdom of Jerusalem; Knights Templar; Teutonic Order; Knights Hospitaller	Ayyubid Sultanate

Commanders and leaders
Pelagio Galvani (surrendered); John of Brienne (surrendered)	Al-Kamil

Strength
40,000 Infantry	Unknown

The battle of Mansurah took place from 26–28 August 1221 near the Egyptian city of Mansurah and was the final battle in the Fifth Crusade (1217–1221). It pitted the Crusader forces under papal legate Pelagius Galvani and John of Brienne, king of Jerusalem, against the Ayyubid forces of the sultan al-Kamil. The result was a decisive victory for the Egyptians and forced the surrender of the Crusaders and their departure from Egypt.

== Background ==
The Fifth Crusade began as a campaign by Western Europeans to reacquire Jerusalem and the rest of the Holy Land by first conquering Egypt, ruled by the powerful Ayyubid sultanate. With some minor skirmishes in Syria in 1217 led by Andrew II of Hungary proving inconclusive, the Crusade turned to Egypt. Cardinal Pelagius Galvani arrived as papal legate and de facto leader of the Crusade, supported by John of Brienne and the masters of the Templars, Hospitallers and Teutonic Knights. The first major action in the Egyptian theatre was the siege of Damietta that began on 23 June 1218, attacking first the fortified tower at the Egyptian port city of Damietta. The siege would last nearly 18 months and, on 5 November 1219, suspecting the city proper had been vacated, the Crusaders entered Damietta, finding it abandoned. Al-Kamil, sultan of Egypt since 31 August 1218 when his father al-Adil died, moved his host from Fariskur downriver to Mansurah.

In the captured city, Pelagius was unable to prod the Crusaders from their inactivity. Al-Kamil took advantage of this lull to reinforce Mansurah into a fortified city that could replace Damietta as the protector of the mouth of the Nile. Pelagius held the view that he held the key to conquering not only Egypt but also Jerusalem, and so would not entertain the peace offerings that came from the sultan . In December 1220, Honorius III announced that Frederick II would soon send troops, expected now in March 1221, with the newly crowned emperor leaving for Egypt in August. Some troops did arrive in May, led by Louis I of Bavaria and his bishop, Ulrich II of Passau, and under orders not to begin offensive operations until Frederick arrived.

Even before the capture of Damietta, the Crusaders became aware of a book which claims that predicted Saladin's earlier capture of Jerusalem and the impending Christian capture of Damietta. Based on this, rumors circulated of a Christian uprising against Islam, influencing the consideration of al-Kamil's peace offerings. Then in July 1221, rumors began that the army of one King David, a descendant of the legendary Prester John, was on its way from the east to the Holy Land to join the Crusade. The story generated so much excitement among the Crusaders that it led them to prematurely launch an attack on Cairo.

== Disaster at Mansurah ==
On 7 July 1221 Pelagius advanced to the south, after a three-day fast. John of Brienne, arriving in Egypt shortly thereafter, argued against the move, but John soon joined the force under the command of the legate. They moved south towards Fariskur on 12 July where Pelagius drew it up in battle formation.

The Crusader force advanced to the city of Sharamsah, between Fariskur and Mansoura on the east bank of the Nile, and occupying the city on 12 July 1221. John again attempted to turn Pelagius back, but the force was intent on the booty awaiting in Cairo. On 24 July, the Crusader forces were relocated near the al-Bahr as-Saghit, now known as the Ushmum canal, south of the village of Ashmun al-Rumman, on the opposite bank from Mansurah. His plan was to maintain supply lines with Damietta, as he had not brought sufficient food for the army.

The fortifications established were poor, and further threatened by Syria reinforcement recently brought to the theater. Alice of Cyprus and the leaders of the military orders warned Pelagius of the large numbers of Muslims troops arriving and continued warnings from John of Brienne went unheeded. Many Crusaders took this opportunity to retreat back to Damietta, later departing for home.

The Egyptians had the advantage of knowing the terrain, especially the canals near the Crusader camp. One such canal near Barāmūn could support large vessels in late August when the Nile was at its highest, and they brought numerous ships up from al-Maḥallah. Entering the Nile, they were able to block the Crusaders' lines of communications with Damietta, rendering their position untenable. In consultation with his military leaders, Pelagius ordered a retreat, only to find the route to Damietta blocked by the sultan's troops.

On 26 August 1221, the Crusaders attempted to reach Barāmūn under the cover of darkness, but their carelessness alerted the Egyptians who set on them. They were also reluctant to sacrifice their stores of wine, drinking them rather than leave them. In the meantime, al-Kamil had the sluices (dikes) along the right bank of the Nile opened, flooding the area and rendering battle impossible. On 28 August, Pelagius sued for peace, sending an envoy to al-Kamil. The battle ended in a Crusader surrender.

== Aftermath ==
Pelagius had some remaining leverage as Damietta was still well-garrisoned. A naval squadron under fleet admiral Henry of Malta, Sicilian chancellor Walter of Palearia, and German imperial marshal Anselm of Justingen, had also been recently sent by Frederick II. They offered the sultan withdrawal from Damietta and an eight-year truce in exchange for allowing the Crusader army to pass, the release of all prisoners, and the return of the relic of the True Cross.

The masters of the military orders were dispatched to Damietta with the news of the surrender. It was not well-received, but the eventual happened on 8 September 1221. The Crusader ships departed and the sultan entered the city. The Fifth Crusade ended in 1221, having accomplished nothing. The Crusaders were unable to even gain the return of the True Cross. The Egyptians could not find it and the Crusaders left empty-handed.

== Bibliography ==
- Archer, Thomas Andrew (1904). The Crusades: The Story of the Latin Kingdom of Jerusalem. Putnam.
- Asbridge, Thomas (2012). The Crusades: The War for the Holy Land. Simon & Schuster. ISBN 978-1-84983-688-3.
- Barker, Ernest (1923). The Crusades. World's manuals. Oxford University Press, London.
- Bird, Jessalyn (2006). Damietta. The Crusades––An Encyclopedia, pp. 343–344.
- Donovan, Joseph P. (1950). Pelagius and the Fifth Crusade. University of Pennsylvania Press. ISBN 9781512801491.
- Fulton, Michael S. (2018). Artillery in the Era of the Crusades. Brill Publications. ISBN 9789004349452.
- Gibb, H. A. R. (1969). The Aiyūbids (PDF). A History of the Crusades (Setton), Volume II. Archived from the original (PDF) on 2023-03-26.
- Humphreys, R. Stephen (1977). From Saladin to the Mongols: The Ayyubids of Damascus, 1193-1260. State University of New York. ISBN 978-0873952637.
- Humphreys, R. Stephen (1987). Ayyubids. Encyclopedia Iranica, Vol. III, Fasc. 2, pp. 164-167.
- Lane-Poole, Stanley (1894). The Mohammedan dynasties: chronological and genealogical tables with historical introductions. A. Constable & Co., Westminster.
- Lane-Poole, Stanley (1901). History of Egypt in the Middle Ages. A History of Egypt; v. 6. Methuen, London. ISBN 9780790532042.
- Lock, Peter (2006). The Routledge Companion to the Crusades. Routledge. doi:10.4324/9780203389638. ISBN 0-415-39312-4.
- Maalouf, Amin (2006). The Crusades through Arab Eyes. Saqi Books. ISBN 9780863560231.
- Murray, Alan V. (2006). The Crusades—An Encyclopedia. ABC-CLIO. ISBN 978-1-57607-862-4.
- Mylod, M. J. (2017). The Fifth Crusade in Context: The Crusading Movement in the Early Thirteenth Century. Routledge. doi:10.4324/9781315574059. ISBN 9780367880354.
- Nicolle, David (2006). Mansurah. The Crusades––An Encyclopedia, pp. 794–795.
- Perry, Guy (2013). John of Brienne: King of Jerusalem, Emperor of Constantinople, c. 1175–1237. Cambridge University Press. ISBN 9781107043107.
- Powell, James M. (1986). Anatomy of a Crusade, 1213-1221. University of Pennsylvania. ISBN 978-0812213232.
- Powell, James M. (2006). Fifth Crusade (1217–1221). The Crusades––An Encyclopedia, pp. 427–432.
- Richard, Jean C. (1999). The Crusades, c.1071 – c.1291. Cambridge University Press. ISBN 978-0-521-62566-1.
- Runciman, Steven (1954). A History of the Crusades, Volume Three: The Kingdom of Acre and the Later Crusades. Cambridge University Press. ISBN 978-0521347723.
- Setton, Kenneth M. (1969). A History of the Crusades. Six Volumes. University of Wisconsin Press.
- Tyerman, Christopher (1996). England and the Crusades, 1095-1588. University of Chicago Press. ISBN 0-226-82012-2.
- Tyerman, Christopher (2006). God's War: A New History of the Crusades. Belknap Press. ISBN 978-0-674-02387-1.
- Van Cleve, Thomas C. (1969). The Fifth Crusade (PDF). A History of the Crusades (Setton), Volume II. Archived from the original (PDF) on 2023-03-26.
- Wolff, Robert Lee (1969). The Latin Empire of Constantinople, 1204-1312 (PDF). A History of the Crusades (Setton), Volume II. Archived from the original (PDF) on 2023-03-26.
- Marvin, Laurence.W. (2015). The Damietta Crusade, 1217–1221: A Military History. University of Wales Press. ISBN 978-0198916178.
- Röhricht, Reinhold (1882). Testimonia minora de quinto bello sacro e chronicis occidentalibus. Wagner'sche Universitäts-Buchhandlung.
