= Attack on Limassol =

Naval raid on Cyprus by the Ayyubid Dynasty

- Part of the Fifth Crusade
| Date | Summer 1220 |
| Location | Limassol, Cyprus |
| Result | Ayyubid victory |

Belligerents
| Kingdom of Cyprus | Ayyubid Sultanate |

Commanders and leaders
| Henry I of Cyprus | Al-Kamil |

Strength
| Unknown | 20 galleys |

Casualties and losses
| All ships burned or captured 13,000 killed or captured (likely exaggerated) | Unknown |

Attack on Limassol occurred in the summer of the year 1220, when the Ayyubid fleet launched a sea raid against the port of Limassol in Cyprus. The raid ended in success for the Ayyubid fleet.

== Background ==
After the capture of Damietta by the Crusaders in 1219, the Ayyubid sultan, Al-Kamil, soon recovered from this setback. He managed to put the war on hold for months. Using this, he began repairing his navy at the city of Rosetta. The Crusaders controlled the eastern branch of the Nile, while the western branch remained unguarded, which allowed the navy to outflank the Crusaders from behind.

== Battle ==
In summer 1220, the Ayyubid navy launched a sea raid against the port of Limassol, which was under the Crusader kingdom of Cyprus, as it was advantageous to the Crusaders. The supply line between Limassol and Damietta was poorly guarded. At Limassol, the Crusader navy was supplying in the port before heading to join the Crusaders in Egypt. The Ayyubid fleet consisted of 20 galleys. Sailing among the Christian ships, they managed to achieve a surprise attack. The Crusader navy was unprepared for any defense.

The Ayyubids managed to burn and capture all the Crusader fleet, killing and enslaving over 13,000 Crusaders, although this number is indeed exaggeration. When news of the raid reached, the Crusader blamed Pelagio Galvani who was dismayed upon learning this. He had already been informed of this raid before; however, he neglected these reports as insignificant. Pelagius soon dispatched a Venetian navy to intercept the Ayyubids, but it was too late as the Ayyubid fleet reached safety with their loot.

== Sources ==
- Fishhof, Gil; Bronstein, Judith; Shotten-Hallel, Vardit R. (2021). Limassol from 1191 to 1300: Its Importance in the Context of Crusade, Trade and Settlement. Routledge. ISBN 9780429515712.
- Nicolaou-Konnari, Angel (2015). Chris Schabel (ed.). Lemesos, A History of Limassol in Cyprus from Antiquity to the Ottoman Conquest. Cambridge Scholars Publishing. ISBN 9781443884624.
- Robinson, John J. (1992). Dungeon, Fire and Sword, The Knights Templar in the Crusades. M. Evans. ISBN 9781590771525.
- Runciman, Steven (1954). A History Of The Crusades Vol-III. Penguin Book.
