= Fifth Crusade =

1217–1221 attempted conquest of the Holy Land

- Part of the Crusades
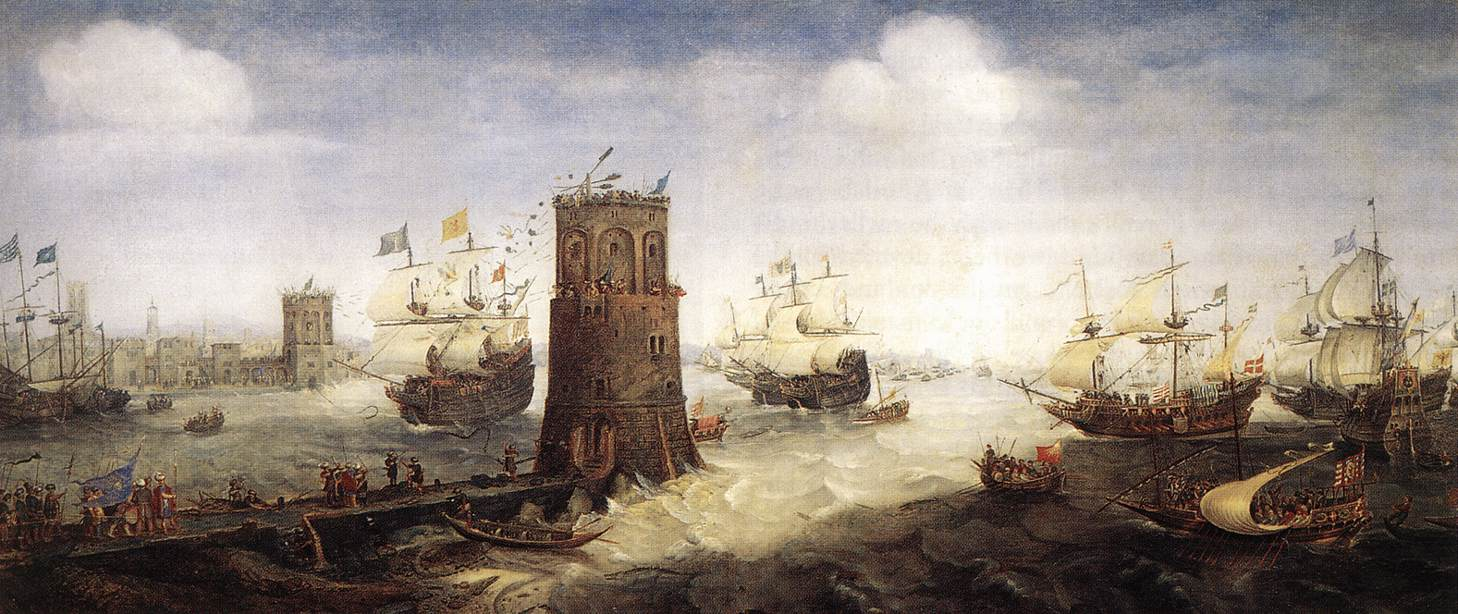
- The Siege of Damietta
Date	September 1217 – August 29, 1221
Location	Syria, Egypt and Iberia
Result	Ayyubid victory

Belligerents
Crusaders: Holy Roman Empire; Kingdom of Hungary; Kingdom of England; Kingdom of France; Kingdom of Portugal; Second Bulgarian Empire; Levant: Kingdom of Jerusalem; Kingdom of Cyprus; Latin Empire; Military orders: Teutonic Order; Knights Templar; Knights Hospitaller; Order of Santiago (in Iberia only)	Muslim forces: Ayyubid Sultanate; Almohad Caliphate

Commanders and leaders
Pelagius Galvani; Leopold VI of Austria; Ludwig I of Bavaria; Simon III of Saarbrücken; Oliver of Paderborn; William I of Holland; Herman V of Baden; Ulrich II of Passau †; Gottfried III of Sponheim †; Adolf VI of Berg # Wilhelm III of Jülich †; Heinrich III of Kuenring; John of Brienne; Andrew II of Hungary; Ranulf de Blondeville; Guillaume II Amanieu de Genève; Hugh I of Cyprus; Bohemond IV of Antioch; Hermann of Salza; Peire de Montagut; Guérin de Montaigu; Aymar de Lairon †; Ivan Asen II of Bulgaria; Soeiro Viegas	Al-Adil I # Al-Kamil; Al-Mu'azzam; Al-Ashraf; Al-Mujahid Shirkuh II; Al-Muzaffar II Mahmud; Abd Allah ibn Abi Bakr

Strength
46,000 men 10,000 cavalry	70,000 men

The Fifth Crusade (September 1217 – August 29, 1221) was a campaign in a series of Crusades by Western Europeans to reacquire Jerusalem and the rest of the Holy Land by first conquering the powerful Egyptian Ayyubid Sultanate, led by Sultan al-Adil, brother of Saladin.

After the failure of the Fourth Crusade, Innocent III again called for a crusade, and began organizing Crusading armies, with the majority of men joining the Fifth Crusade being from Germany, but also non-German forces from elsewhere inside the Holy Roman Empire (northern Italy) and other contigents. The crusader orders, the Kingdom of Jerusalem and briefly Hungary would participated among other small contigents. These armies were initially led by Andrew II of Hungary and Leopold VI of Austria upon arrival in Palestine, soon to be joined by John of Brienne, titular King of Jerusalem. Unlike previous crusades, few would join from France, as French nobles were preoccupied with events in western Europe. An initial campaign in late 1217 in Syria was inconclusive, and Andrew departed. A German army led by cleric Oliver of Paderborn, and another, more mixed army also from the Holy Roman Empire of German, Dutch, Flemish and Frisian soldiers led by William I of Holland and George of Wied, then joined the Crusade in Acre, with a goal of first conquering Egypt, viewed as the key to Jerusalem. There, cardinal Pelagius Galvani arrived as papal legate and de facto leader of the Crusade, supported by John of Brienne and the masters of the Templars, Hospitallers and Teutonic Knights. Holy Roman Emperor Frederick II, who had taken the cross in 1215, did not personally participate as promised, despite the majority of forces involved being from his imperial domain.

Following the successful siege of Damietta in 1218–1219, the Crusaders occupied the port for two years. Al-Kamil, now Sultan of Egypt, offered attractive peace terms, including the restoration of Jerusalem to Christian rule. The sultan was rebuked by Pelagius several times, and the Crusaders marched south towards Cairo in July 1221. En route, they attacked a stronghold of al-Kamil at the battle of Mansurah, but they were defeated and forced to surrender. The terms of surrender included the retreat from Damietta—leaving Egypt altogether—and an eight-year truce. The Fifth Crusade ended in September 1221, a Crusader defeat that failed to achieve its goals.

== Background ==
By 1212, Innocent III had been pope for 14 years and faced the disappointment of the Fourth Crusade and its inability to recover Jerusalem, the on-going Albigensian Crusade, begun in 1209, and the popular fervor of the Children's Crusade of 1212. The Latin Empire of Constantinople was established, with the emperor Baldwin I essentially elected by the Venetians. (The imperial crown was at first offered to doge Enrico Dandolo, who refused it.) The first Latin Patriarch of Constantinople, the Venetian Thomas Morosini, was contested by the pope as uncanonical.

The ongoing situation in Europe was chaotic. Philip of Swabia was locked in a dispute of the throne in Germany with Otto of Brunswick. Innocent III's attempts to reconcile their differences was rendered moot with Philip's assassination on 21 June 1208. Otto was crowned Holy Roman Emperor and fought against the pope, resulting in his excommunication. France was heavily invested in the Albigensian Crusade and was quarreling with John Lackland, resulting in the Anglo-French war of 1213–1214. Sicily was ruled by the child-king Henry II and Spain was occupied in their crusade against the Almohads. There was little appetite in Europe for a new Crusade.

In Jerusalem, John of Brienne became the effective ruler of the kingdom through his marriage to Maria of Montferrat. In 1212, Isabella II of Jerusalem was proclaimed queen of Jerusalem shortly after her birth, and her father John became regent. Antioch was consumed with the War of the Antiochene Succession, begun with the death of Bohemond III, not to be resolved until 1219.

Before the arrival of John of Brienne in Acre in 1210, the local Christians had refused to renew their truce the Ayyubids. The next year, John negotiated with the aging sultan al-Adil a new truce between the kingdom and the sultanate to last through 1217. At the same time, in light of the strength of the Muslims and their renewed fortifications, John also asked the pope for help. There was no real force among the Syrian Franks, with many of the deployed knights returning home. If a new Crusade were to begin, it must come from Europe.

Innocent III had hoped to mount such a Crusade to the Holy Land, never forgetting the goal of restoring Jerusalem to Christian control. The pathos of the Children's Crusade only nerved him to fresh efforts. But for Innocent, this tragedy had its moral: "the very children put us to shame, while we sleep they go forth gladly to conquer the Holy Land."

== Preparations for the Crusade ==
In April 1213, Innocent III issued his papal bull Quia maior, calling all of Christendom to join a new Crusade. This was followed by a conciliar decree, the Ad Liberandam, in 1215. The attendant papal instructions engaged a new enterprise to recover Jerusalem while establishing Crusading norms that were to last nearly a century.

The message of the Crusade was preached in France by legate Robert of Courçon, a former classmate of the pope's. He was met with bitter complaints by the clergy, accusing the legate of encroaching on their domains. Philip II of France supported his clergy, and Innocent III realized the Robert's zeal was a threat to the success of the Crusade. On 11 November 1215, the Fourth Lateran Council was convened. The prelates of France presented their grievances, many well-founded, and the pope pleaded for them to forgive the legate's indiscretions. In the end, very few Frenchmen took part in the expedition of 1217, unwilling to go in the company of Germans and Hungarians, with France represented by Aubrey of Reims and the bishops of Limoges and Bayeux, Jean de Veyrac and Robert des Ablèges.

At the council, Innocent III called for the recovery of the Holy Land. Innocent wanted it to be led by the papacy, as the First Crusade should have been, to avoid the mistakes of the Fourth Crusade, which had been taken over by the Venetians. He planned to meet with the Crusaders at Brindisi and Messina for departure on 1 June 1217, and prohibited trade with the Muslims in order to ensure that the Crusaders would have ships and weapons, renewing an 1179 edict. Every Crusader would receive an indulgence as well as those who simply helped pay the expenses of a Crusader, but did not go on the Crusade themselves.

In order to protect Raoul of Merencourt, the Latin patriarch of Jerusalem, on his return trip to the kingdom, Innocent III tasked John of Brienne to provide escort. As John was in conflict with Leo I of Armenia and Hugh I of Cyprus, the pope ordered them to reconcile their differences before the Crusaders reached the Holy Land.

Innocent III died on 16 July 1216 and Honorius III was consecrated as pope the next week. The Crusade dominated the early part of his papacy. The next year, he crowned Peter II of Courtenay as Latin Emperor, who was captured on his eastward journey in Epirus and died in confinement.

Robert of Courçon was sent as spiritual advisor to the French fleet, but subordinate to newly-chosen papal delegate Pelagius of Albano. Bishop Walter II of Autun, a veteran of the Fourth Crusade, would also return to the Holy Land with the Fifth Crusade. French canon Jacques de Vitry had come under the influence of the saintly Marie of Oignies and preached the Albigensian Crusade after 1210. He arrived at his new position as Bishop of Acre in 1216 and shortly thereafter Honorius III tasked him with preaching the Crusade in the Latin settlements of Syria, made difficult with the rampant corruption at the port cities.

Oliver of Paderborn preached the Crusade in Germany and had great success in recruitment. In July 1216, Honorius III called on Andrew II of Hungary to fulfill his father's vow to lead a Crusade. Like many other rulers, the pope's former pupil, Frederick II of Germany, had taken an oath to embark for the Holy Land in 1215 and appealed to German nobility to join. But Frederick II hung back, with his crown still in contention with Otto IV, and Honorius repeatedly put off the date for the beginning of the expedition.

In Europe, the troubadours were equally adept in awakening the interest in the Crusade. These included Elias Cairel, a veteran of the Fourth Crusade, Pons de Capduelh, later joining the Crusade in 1220, and Aimery de Pégulhan, who implored by verse a young William VI of Montferrat to follow in his father's footsteps and take the cross.

The strength of the armies was estimated at more than 32,000, including more than 10,000 knights. It was described by a contemporaneous Arab historian as: "This year, an infinite number of warriors left from Rome the great and other countries of the West." The Crusader force was also prepared to use the latest siege technology, including counterweight trebuchets.

== In Iberia and the Levant ==
The departure of the Crusaders began finally in early July 1217. Many of the Crusaders decided to go to the Holy Land by their traditional sea journey. The fleet made their first stop at Dartmouth on the southern coast of England. There they elected their leaders and the laws by which they would organize their venture. From there, led by William I of Holland, they continued on their way south to Lisbon. As in previous crusading seaborne journeys, the fleet was dispersed by storms and only gradually managed to reach the Portuguese city of Lisbon after making a stopover at the famous shrine of Santiago de Compostela.

At their arrival in Portugal, Bishop Soeiro Viegas of Lisbon attempted to persuade the Crusaders to help the Portuguese capture the Almohad-controlled city of Alcácer do Sal. The Frisians, however, refused on account of Innocent III's disqualification of the venture at the Fourth Lateran Council. The other members of the fleet, however, were convinced by the Portuguese and started the siege of Alcácer do Sal in August 1217. The Crusaders finally captured the city with the help of the Knights Templar and Knights Hospitaller in October 1217.

A group of Frisians who refused to aid the Portuguese with their siege plans against Alcácer do Sal, preferred to raid several coastal towns on their way to the Holy Land. They attacked Faro, Rota and Cádiz, gaining much booty thereby. They thereafter followed the coast of southern France and wintered in Civitavecchia in Italy in 1217–1218, before continuing on their way to Acre. In the north, Ingi II of Norway took the cross in 1216, only to die the next spring, and the eventual Scandinavian expedition was of little consequence.

Innocent III had managed to secure the participation of the Kingdom of Georgia in the Crusade. Tamar of Georgia, queen since 1184, led the Georgian state to its zenith of power and prestige in the Middle Ages. Under her rule, Georgia challenged Ayyubid rule in eastern Anatolia. Tamar died in 1213 and was succeeded by her son George IV of Georgia. In the late 1210s, according to the Georgian chronicles, he began making preparations for a campaign in the Holy Land to support the Franks. His plans were cut short by the invasion of the Mongols in 1220. After the death of George IV, his sister Rusudan of Georgia notified the pope that Georgia was unable to fulfill its promises.

== Situation in the Holy Land ==
Saladin had died in 1193 and was succeeded in most of his domain by his brother al-Adil, who was the patriarch of all successive Ayyubid sultans of Egypt. Saladin's son az-Zahir Ghazi retained his leadership in Aleppo. An exceptionally low Nile River resulted in a failure of the crops in 1201–1202, and famine and pestilence ensued. People abandoned themselves to atrocious practices, habitually resorting to cannibalism. Violent earthquakes, felt as far away as Syria and Armenia, devastated whole cities, and increased the general misery.

After naval raids on Rosetta in 1204 and Damietta in 1211, the chief concern of al-Adil was Egypt. He was willing to make concessions to avoid war, and favoured the Italian maritime states of Venice and Pisa, both for trading reasons and to preclude them from supporting further crusades. Most of his reign was conducted under truces with the Christians, and he constructed a new fortress at Mount Tabor, to buttress the defenses of Jerusalem and Damascus. Most of his conflicts in Syria were with the Knights Hospitaller at Krak des Chevaliers or with Bohemond IV of Antioch, and were dealt with by his nephew az-Zahir Ghazi. Only once, in 1207, did he directly confront the Crusaders, capturing al-Qualai'ah, besieging Krak des Chevaliers and advancing to Tripoli, before accepting an indemnity from Bohemond IV in exchange for peace.

Az-Zahir maintained an alliance with both Antioch and Kaykaus I, the Seljuk sultan of Rûm, to check the influence of Leo I of Armenia, as well as to keep his options open to challenge his uncle. Az-Zahir died in 1216, leaving as his successor al-Aziz Muhammad, his 3-year-old son, whose mother was Dayfa Khatun, al-Adil's daughter. Saladin's eldest son, al-Afdal, emerged to make a bid for Aleppo, enlisting the help of Kaykaus I, who also had designs on the region. In 1218, al-Afdal and Kaykaus invaded Aleppo and advanced on the capital. The situation was resolved when al-Ashraf, al-Adil's third son, routed the Seljuk army, which remained a menace until the death of Kaykaus in 1220. Given the Crusaders' Egyptian plan, these diversions were useful in stretching the resources of the sultanate that controlled the Levant with an uneasy cooperation.

== Crusade of Andrew II of Hungary ==
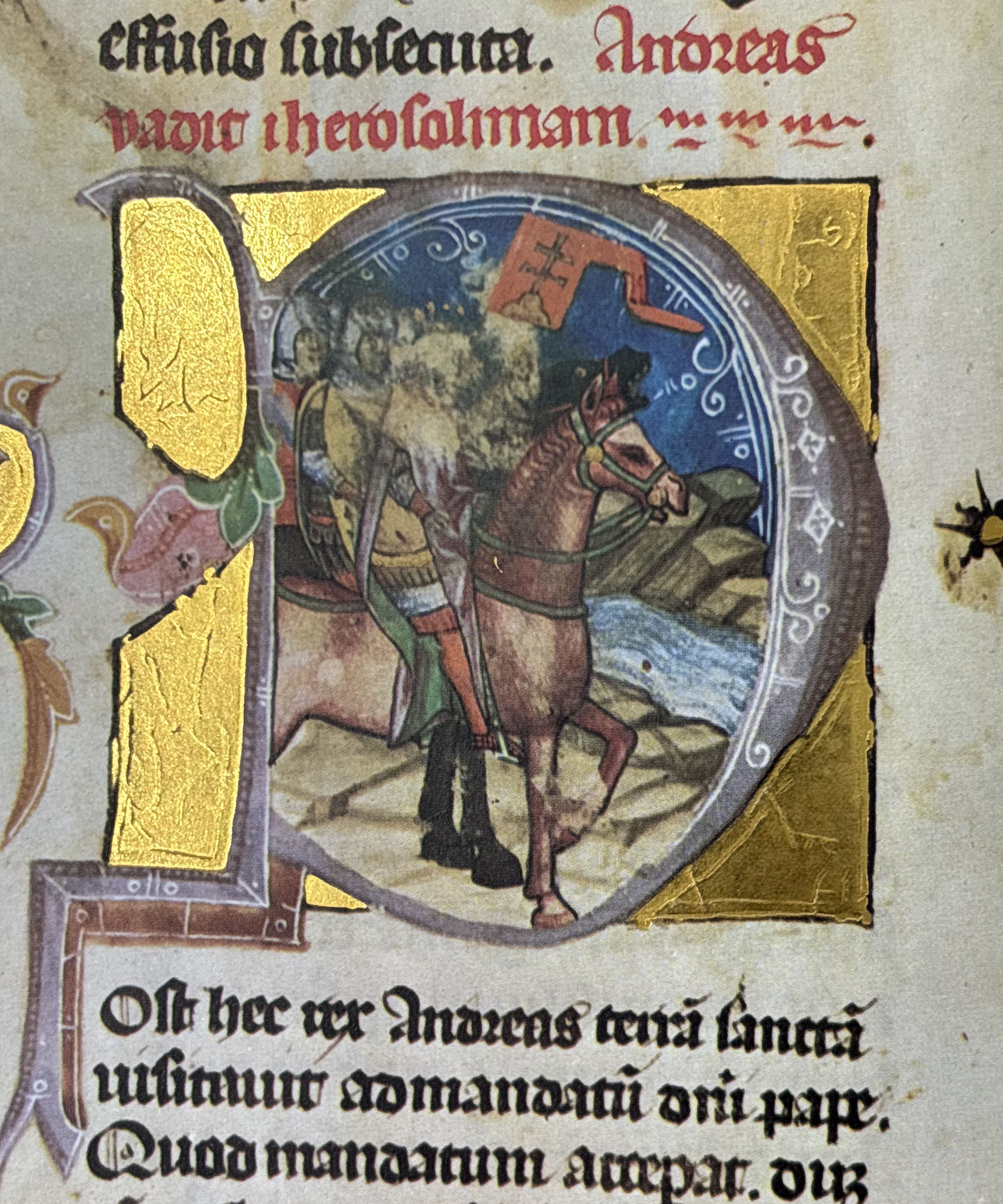
King Andrew II of Hungary at the head of his crusader army (Illuminated Chronicle)

The first to take up the cross in the Fifth Crusade was King Andrew II of Hungary. Andrew II had been called on by the pope in July 1216 to fulfill his father Béla III's vow to lead a crusade, and finally agreed, having postponed three times earlier. Andrew, who was reputed to have designs on becoming Latin emperor, mortgaged his estates to finance the Crusade. In July 1217, Andrew departed from Zagreb, accompanied by Leopold VI of Austria and Otto I, Duke of Merania. King Andrew's army (including the Germans under Leopold VI) was said to be so large—at least 20,000 mounted soldiers and even much more "uncountable" infantrymen—that most of it stayed behind when Andrew and his men embarked in Split two months later. They were transported by the Venetian fleet, the largest European fleet of the times. Andrew and his troops embarked from Split on 23 August 1217. Andrew II arrived with 4,000 Germans and Hungarians at Acre.

The Hungarian army landed on 9 October 1217 on Cyprus from where they sailed to Acre and joined John of Brienne, Raoul of Merencourt and Hugh I of Cyprus. Until his return to Hungary, King Andrew remained the leader of Christian forces in the Fifth Crusade. In October 1217, the leaders of the expedition held a war council there, presided by Andrew II. Representing the military orders were the masters Guérin de Montaigu of the Hospitallers, Guillaume de Chartres of the Templars, and Hermann of Salza of the Teutonic Knights. Additional attendees included Leopold VI of Austria, Otto I of Merania, Walter II of Avesnes, and numerous archbishops and bishops.

The war plan of John of Brienne envisioned a two-prong attack. In Syria, Andrew's forces would engage al-Mu'azzam, son of Al-Adil, at the stronghold of Nablus. At the same time, the fleet was to attack the port city of Damietta, wresting Egypt from the Muslims and enabling the conquest of the remainder of Syria and Palestine. This plan was abandoned at Acre due to the lack of manpower and ships. Instead, in anticipation of reinforcements, the objective was to keep the enemy occupied in a series of small engagements, perhaps going as far as Damascus.

The Muslims knew that the Crusaders were coming in 1216 with the exodus of merchants from Alexandria. Once the host gathered at Acre, Al-Adil began operations in Syria, leaving the bulk of his forces in Egypt under his eldest son and viceroy Al-Kamil. He personally led a small contingent to support al-Mu'azzam, then emir of Damascus. With too few to engage the Crusaders, he guarded the approaches to Damascus while al-Mu'azzam was sent to Nablus to protect Jerusalem.

The Crusaders were camped near Acre at Tel Afek, and on 3 November 1217 began to traverse the plain of Esdraelon towards 'Ain Jalud, expecting an ambush. Upon seeing the strength of the Crusaders, al-Adil withdrew to Beisan against the wishes of al-Mu'azzam who wanted to attack from the heights of Nain. Again against the wishes of his son, Al-Adil abandoned Beisan which soon fell to the Crusaders who pillaged the city. He continued his retreat to Ajlun, ordering al-Mu'azzam to protect Jerusalem from the heights of Lubban, near Shiloh. Al-Adil continued to Damascus, stopping at Marj al-Saffar.

On 10 November 1217, the Crusaders crossed the Jordan River at the Jisr el-Majami, threatening Damascus. The governor of the city took defensive measures, and received reinforcements from al-Mujahid Shirkuh, the Ayyubid emir of Homs. Without engaging the enemy, the Crusaders returned to the camp near Acre, crossing over Jacob's Ford. Andrew II did not return to the battlefield, preferring to remain in Acre collecting relics.

Now under the command of John of Brienne, as supported by Bohemond IV, the Hungarians and Germans moved against Mount Tabor, regarded by the Muslims as impregnable. A battle fought on 3 December 1217 was soon abandoned by the leaders, only to be revisited by the Templars and Hospitallers. Met with Greek fire, the siege was abandoned on 7 December 1217. A third sortie by the Hungarians, possibly led by Andrew's nephew, met disaster at Mashghara. The small force was decimated, and the few survivors returned to Acre on Christmas Eve. Thus ended what is known as the Hungarian Crusade of 1217.

At the beginning of 1218, an ailing Andrew decided to return to Hungary, under the threat of excommunication. Andrew and his army departed to Hungary in February 1218, stopping first at Tripoli for the marriage of Bohemond IV and Melisende of Lusignan. Hugh I of Cyprus, accompanying his fellow commanders, became ill at the ceremony and died shortly thereafter. Andrew returned to Hungary in 1218.

In the meantime, efforts were taken to strengthen Château Pèlerin, by the Templars and aided by Walter II of Aveses, and Caesarea which proved later to be valuable moves. Later in the year, Oliver of Paderborn arrived with a new German army and William I of Holland arrived with a mixed army consisting of Dutch, Flemish and Frisian soldiers. As it became clear that Frederick II was not coming to the East, they began detailed planning. The campaign was to be led by John of Brienne, based on his status in the kingdom and his proven military reputation. The original objective abandoned the year before due to lack of resources was reinstated. The decision to attack Egypt had been made, a springtime assault on Jerusalem rejected because of excessive heat and lack of water. They focused their main thrust on the port of Damietta rather than Alexandria. The European Crusader army was supplemented by troops from the kingdom and the military orders.

== Campaign in Egypt ==
On 27 May 1218, the first of the Crusader's fleet arrived at the harbor of Damietta, on the right bank of the Nile. Simon III of Sarrebrück was chosen as temporary leader pending the arrival of the rest of the fleet. Within a few days, the remaining ships arrived, carrying John of Brienne, Leopold VI of Austria and masters Peire de Montagut, Hermann of Salza and Guérin de Montaigu. A lunar eclipse on 9 July was viewed as a good omen.

The Muslims were not alarmed at the arrival of the Crusaders, believing that they would not successfully mount an attack on Egypt. Al-Adil was both surprised and disappointed in the West, supporting peace treaties when more radical elements in the sultanate sought jihad. He was still camped at Marj al-Saffar, and his sons al-Kamil and al-Mu'azzam were tasked with defending Cairo and the Syrian coast, respectively. Available reinforcements were sent from Syria, and an Egyptian force encamped at al-'Adiliyah, a few miles south of Damietta. The Egyptians were of insufficient strength to attack the Crusaders, but did serve to oppose any invader attempt to cross the Nile.

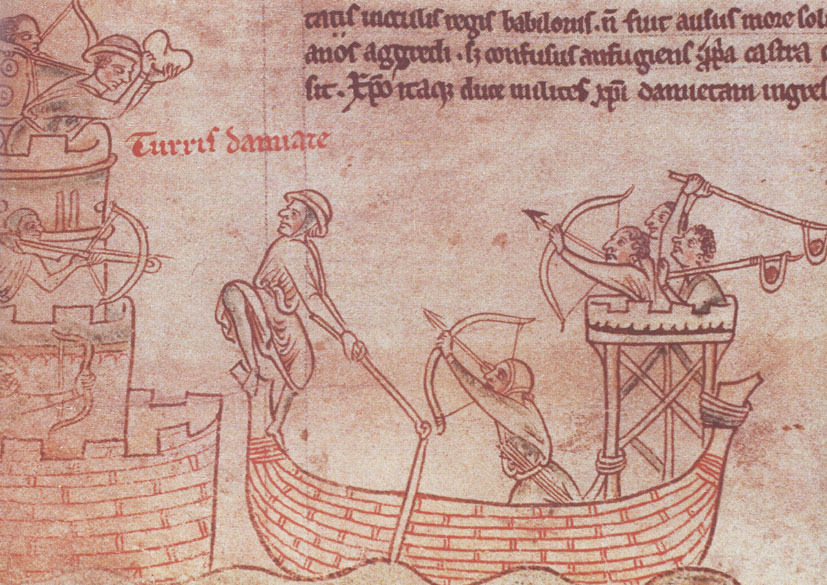
Frisian crusaders attack a tower near Damietta during the Fifth Crusade (from Matthew Paris' 13th-century Chronica Majora).

=== The Tower of Damietta ===
The fortifications of Damietta were impressive, consisting of three walls of varying heights, with dozens of towers on the interior, and were enhanced to repel the invaders. Situated on an island in the Nile was the Burj al-Silsilah—the chain tower—called so because of the massive iron chains that could stretch across the river preventing passage. The tower, containing 70 tiers and housing hundreds of soldiers, was key to the capture of the city.

The siege of Damietta began on 23 June 1218 with an assault on the tower, utilizing upwards of 80 ships some with projectile machines, with no success. Two new types of vessels were adapted to meet the needs of the siege. The first, used by Leopold VI and the Hospitallers, was able to secure scaling ladders mounted on two ships bound together. The second, called a maremme, was commanded by Adolf VI of Berg (brother of the Archbishop of Cologne Engelbert II of Berg) and included a small fortress on the mast to hurl stones and javelins. The maremme, attacking first, was forced to withdraw when faced with an intense counter-barrage. The scaling ladders, secured against the walls, collapsed under the weight of the soldiers. The first attempt at an assault was a failure.

Oliver of Paderborn, supported by his Frisian and German followers, demonstrating considerable ingenuity and leadership, constructed an ingenious siege engine combining the best features of the earlier models. Protected from Greek fire by hides, it included a revolving ladder that extended far beyond the ship. On 24 August the renewed assault began. By the next day, the tower was taken and the defensive chains cut.

The loss of the tower was a great shock to the Ayyubids, and the sultan al-Adil died shortly thereafter, on 31 August 1218. His body was secretly taken to Damascus and his treasure dispersed before his death was announced. He was succeeded as sultan by his son al-Kamil. The new sultan immediately implemented defensive measures, including scuttling a number of ships a mile upstream, resulting in the Nile being blocked for much of the winter of 1218–1219.

=== Preparation for the siege ===
The Crusaders did not press their advantage, and many prepared to return home, regarding their crusading vows satisfied. Further offensive action would nevertheless have to wait until the Nile was more favourable and the arrival of additional forces. Among them were papal legate Pelagius Galvani and his aide Robert of Courçon, who travelled with a contingent of Roman Crusaders financed by the pope. A group from England, smaller than expected arrived shortly, led by Ranulf de Blondeville, and Oliver and Richard, illegitimate sons of King John. A group of French Crusaders that arrived at the end of October included Guillaume II de Genève, archbishop of Bordeaux, and the newly elected bishop of Beauvais, Milo of Nanteuil.

On 9 October 1218, Egyptian forces conducted a surprise attack on the Crusaders' camp. Discovering their movements, John of Brienne and his retinue attacked and annihilated the Egyptian advance guard, hindering the main force. From the outset, Pelagius considered himself the supreme commander of the Crusade, and, unable to mount a major offensive, sent specially equipped ships up the Nile to no avail. A follow-on attack on the Crusaders on 26 October also failed, as did a Crusader attempt to dredge an abandoned canal, the al-Azraq, to bypass al-Kamil's new defensive measures on the Nile.

The Crusaders now built an enormous floating fortress on the river, but a storm that began on 9 November 1218 blew it near the Egyptian camp. The Egyptians seized the fortress, killing nearly all of its defenders. Only two soldiers survived the attack. They were accused of cowardice, and John ordered their execution. The storm, lasting 3 days, flooded both camps and the Crusaders' supplies and transportation were devastated. In the ensuing months diseases killed many of the Crusaders, including Robert of Courçon. During the storm, Pelagius took control of the expedition. The Crusaders supported this, feeling the need for new, more aggressive leadership. By February 1219, they were able to mount new offensives, but were unsuccessful because of the weather and strength of the defenders.

At this time, al-Kamil, in command of the defenders, when he was almost overthrown by a coup to replace him with his younger brother al-Faiz Ibrahim. Alerted to the conspiracy, al-Kamil had to flee the camp to safety and in the ensuing confusion the Crusaders were able to advance on Damietta. Al-Kamil considered fleeing to the Ayyubid emirate of Yemen, ruled by his son al-Mas'ud Yusuf, but the arrival of his brother al-Mu'azzam with reinforcements from Syria ended the conspiracy. The Crusader attack mounted against the Egyptians on 5 February 1219 was then different, the defenders having fled, abandoning the camp.

The Crusaders now surrounded Damietta, with the Italians to the north, Templars and Hospitallers to the east, and John of Brienne with his French and Pisan troops to the south. The Frisians and Germans occupied the old camp across the river. A new wave of reinforcements from Cyprus arrived led by Walter III of Caesarea.

At this point, al-Kamil and al-Mu'azzam attempted to open negotiations with the Crusaders, asking Christian envoys to come to their camp. They offered to surrender the kingdom of Jerusalem, less al-Karak and Krak de Montréal which guarded to road to Egypt, with a multi-year truce, in exchange for the Crusaders' evacuation of Egypt. John of Brienne and the other secular leaders were in favour of the offer, as the original objective of the Crusade was the recovery of Jerusalem. But Pelagius and the leaders of the Templars, Hospitallers and Venetians refused this and a subsequent offer with compensation for the fortresses, damaging the unity of the enterprise. Al-Mu'azzam responded by reorganizing his reinforcements at Fariskur, upriver from al-'Adiliyah. Unknown to the Crusaders, Damietta could have been easily taken at this point due to illness and death among the defenders.

In the Holy Land, al-Mu'azzam's forces began dismantling fortifications at Mount Tabor and other defensive positions, as well as Jerusalem itself, in order to deny their protection should the Crusaders prevail there. Al-Muzaffar II Mahmud, the son of the Ayyubid emir of Hama (and later emir himself), arrived in Egypt with Syrian reinforcements, leading multiple attacks on the Crusader camp through 7 April 1219, with little impact. In the meantime, Crusaders such as Leopold VI of Austria were returning to Europe, but were more than offset by new recruits, including Guy I Embriaco, who brought badly needed supplies. Muslim attacks continued through May, with Crusader counterattacks utilizing a Lombardy device known as a carroccio, confounding the defenders.

Despite objections from the military leaders, Pelagius began multiple attacks on the city on 8 July 1219 using Pisan and Venetian troops. Each time they were repelled by the defenders, using Greek fire. A counteroffensive by the Egyptians on the Templar camp on 31 July was repulsed by their new leader Peire de Montagut, supported by the Teutonic Knights. Fighting continued into August when the waters of the Nile receded. An attack on the sultan's camp at Fariskur on 29 August led by Pelagius' faction was a disaster, resulting in high losses for the Crusaders. The Marshal of the Hospitaller, Aymar de Lairon, and many Templars were killed. Only the intervention by John of Brienne, Ranulf de Blondeville, and the Templars and Hospitallers prevented further loss.

In August 1219, the sultan again offered peace, possibly out of desperation, using recent captives as envoys to the Christians. This included his earlier provisions plus paying for the restoration of the damaged fortifications, the return of the portion of the True Cross lost at the battle of Hattin and the release of prisoners. Again, his offer was rejected along familiar lines. Pelagius' view that victory was possible was supported by the continued arrival of new Crusades, most notably an English force led by Savari de Mauléon, a seneschal of the late John of England.

=== Saint Francis in Egypt ===
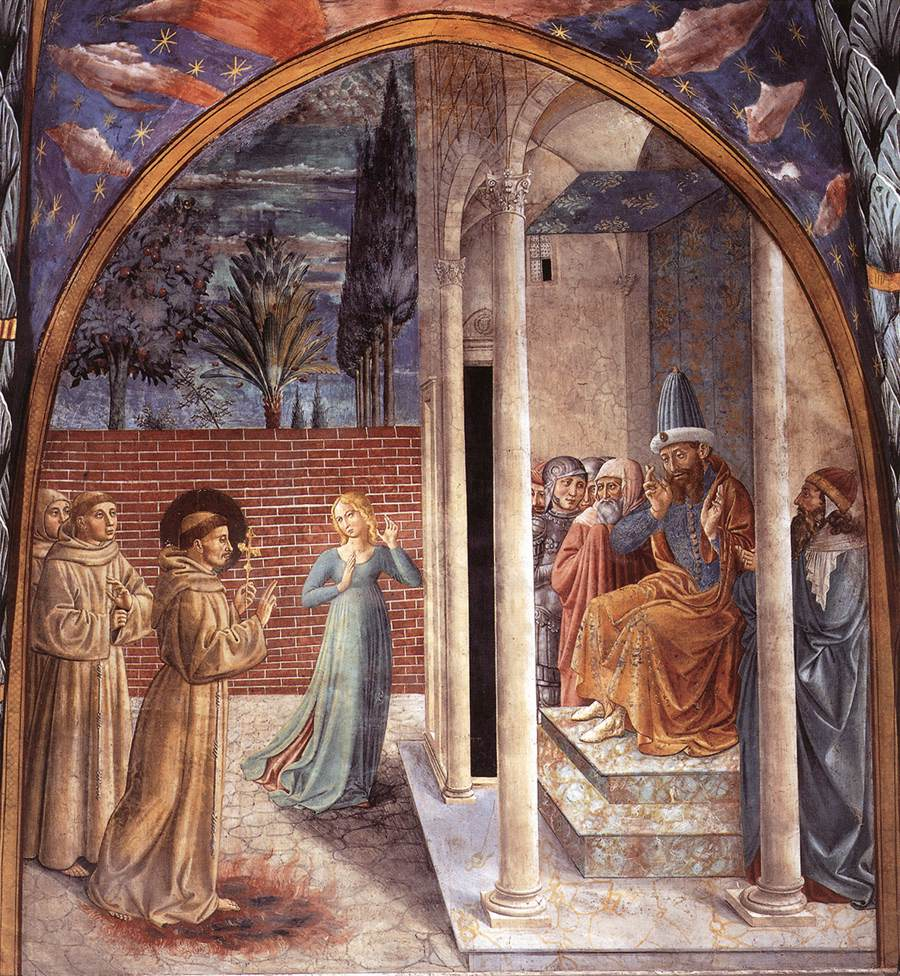
Saint Francis of Assisi and Illuminato da Rieti before Sultan al-Kamil. 15th century fresco by Benozzo Gozzoli.

In September 1219, Francis of Assisi arrived in the Crusader camp seeking permission from Pelagius to visit Sultan al-Kamil. Francis had a long history with the Crusades. In 1205, Francis prepared to enlist in the army of Walter III of Brienne (brother of John), diverted from the Fourth Crusade to fight in Italy. He returned to a life of the mendicants, later meeting with Innocent III who approved his religious order. After the Christian victory at the battle of Las Navas de Tolosa in 1212, he travelled to meet with Almohad caliph Muhammad an-Nāsir, ostensibly to convert him to Christianity. Francis did not make it to Morocco, only getting as far as Santiago de Compostela, he returned, sickened, but with a mission. His fabled experience with the wolf of Gubbio exemplified his view of the power of the cross.

Initially refusing the request, Pelagius granted Francis and his companion, Illuminato da Rieti, to go on what was assumed to be a suicide mission. They crossed over to preach to al-Kamil, who assumed that the holy men were emissaries of the Crusaders and received them courteously. When he discovered that their intent was instead to preach against the evils of Islam, some in his court demanded the execution of the friars. Al-Kamil instead heard them out and had them escorted back to the Crusader camp. Francis did obtain a commitment for more humane treatment for the Christian captives. It was claimed in a sermon by Bonaventure that the sultan converted or accepted a death-bed baptism as a result of his meeting with Francis.

Francis remained in Egypt through the fall of Damietta, departing then for Acre. While there, he established the Province of the Holy Land, a priory of the Franciscan Order, obtaining for the friars the foothold they still retain as guardians of the holy places.

=== Siege of Damietta ===
With the negotiations with the Crusaders stalled and Damietta isolated, on 3 November 1219 al-Kamil sent a resupply convoy through the sector manned by the troops of the Frenchman Hervé IV of Donzy. The Egyptians were by and large stopped, some getting through to the city, resulting in the expulsion of Hervé. The intrusion energized the Crusaders with a unity of purpose.

On 5 November 1219, suspecting the city had been vacated, the Crusaders entered Damietta and found it abandoned, filled with the dead and with most of the remaining citizens ill. Seeing the Christian banners flying over the city, al-Kamil moved his host from Fariskur downriver to Mansurah. Survivors in the city were either sent into slavery or held as hostage to trade for Christian prisoners.

The fortifications of Damietta were essentially undamaged, and the victorious Crusaders claimed much booty. By 23 November 1219, they had captured the neighboring city of Tinnis, on the Tanitic mouth of the Nile, providing access to the food sources of Lake Manzala.

As usual, there was partisan struggles as to the rule of the city, secular or ecclesiastic. At some point, John of Brienne had enough, equipping three ships for departure. Pelagius relented, allowing John to lead Damietta pending a decision by the pope. Nevertheless, the Italians, feeling deprived of booty, took arms against the French and expelled them from the city. Not until 2 February 1220 did the situation stabilize, with a formal ceremony conducted to celebrate the Christian victory. John soon departed for the Holy Land, either piqued at Pelagius or to stake his claim to Armenia. Either way, Honorius III soon decided Damietta's fate in favour of his legate Pelagius.

Among the casualties of the campaign for Damietta were Oliver, son of John Lackland, Milo IV of Puiset and his son Walter, and Hugh IX of Lusignan. Templar Guillaume de Chartres died of the plague before the siege began.

=== John of Brienne returns to Jerusalem ===
The father-in-law of John of Brienne, Leo I of Armenia, died on 2 May 1219, leaving his succession in doubt. John's claim to the Armenian throne was through his wife Stephanie of Armenia and their infant son, and Leo I had instead left the kingdom to his infant daughter Isabella of Armenia. The pope decreed in February 1220 that John was the rightful heir to the Armenian Kingdom of Cilicia. John left Damietta for Jerusalem around Easter 1220 in order to assert his claim to his inheritance. His departure had been rumored to be due to desertion which was not the case.

Stephanie and their son died shortly after John's arrival, ending his claim to Cilicia. When Honorius III learned of their deaths, he declared Raymond-Roupen (whom Leo I had disinherited) the lawful ruler, threatening John with excommunication if he fought for Cilicia. To solidify his position, Raymond-Roupen travelled to Damietta in the summer of 1220 to meet with Pelagius.

After Damietta was captured, Walter of Caesarea had brought 100 Cypriote knights and their men-at-arms, including a Cypriote knight named Peter Chappe, and his charge, a young Philip of Novara. While in Egypt, Philip received instruction from the jurisconsult Ralph of Tiberias. In John's absence, Pelagius left the sea routes between Damietta and Acre unguarded, and a Muslim fleet attacked the Crusaders in the port of Limassol, resulting in over a thousand casualties. Most of the Cypriotes departed Egypt at the same time as John. When he returned, he passed through Cyprus and brought some forces with him.

John remained in Jerusalem for several months, primarily due to lack of funds. Since his nephew Walter IV of Brienne was approaching the age of majority, John surrendered the County of Brienne to him in 1221. John returned to Egypt and rejoined the Crusade on 6 July 1221 at the direction of the pope.

=== Disaster at Mansurah ===
The situation in Damietta after the February 1220 celebration was one of inactivity and discontent. The army lacked discipline despite Pelagius' draconian rule. His extensive regulations prevented adequate protection of the shipping lanes from Cyprus, and several ships carrying pilgrims were sunk. Many Crusaders departed, but were supplement by fresh troops including contingents led by the archbishop of Milan, Enrico da Settala, and the unnamed archbishop of Crete. This was the prelude to the disastrous battle of Mansurah of 1221 that would end the Crusade.

Late in 1220 or early in 1221, al-Kamil sent Fakhr ad-Din ibn as-Shaikh on an embassy to the court of al-Kamil's brother al-Ashraf, now ruling greater Armenia from Sinjar, to request assistance against the Crusaders. He was at first refused. The Muslim world was now threatened also by the Mongols in Persia. When Abbasid caliph al-Nasir requested troops from al-Ashraf, however, the latter chose instead to send them assist his brother in Egypt. The Ayyubids regarded the Mongol ouster of Ala ad-Din Muhammad II, shah of the Khwarazmians, as destroying one of their main enemies, allowing them to focus on the invaders at Damietta.

In the captured city, Pelagius was unable to prod the Crusaders from their inactivity through the year 1220, save for a Templar raiding party on Burlus in July 1220. The town was pillaged, but at the cost of the loss and capture of numerous knights. The relative calm in Egypt enabled al-Mu'azzam, returning to Syria after the defeat at Damietta, to attack the remaining coastal strongholds, taking Caesarea. By October, he had further degraded the defenses of Jerusalem and unsuccessfully attacking Château Pèlerin, defended by Peire de Montagut and his Templars, recently released from their duty in Egypt.

Al-Kamil took advantage of this lull to reinforce Mansurah, once a small camp, into a fortified city that could perhaps replace Damietta as the protector of the mouth of the Nile. At some point, he renewed his peace offering to the Crusaders. Again it was refused, with Pelagius' view that he held the key to conquering not only Egypt but also Jerusalem. In December 1220, Honorius III announced that Frederick II would soon be sending troops, expected now in March 1221, with the newly crowned emperor leaving for Egypt in August. Some troops did arrive in May, led by Louis I of Bavaria and his bishop, Ulrich II of Passau, and under orders not to begin offensive operations until Frederick arrived.

Even before the capture of Damietta, the Crusaders became aware of a book, written in Arabic, which claims to have predicted Saladin's earlier capture of Jerusalem and the impending Christian capture of Damietta. Based on this and other prophetic works, rumors circulated of a Christian uprising against the power of Islam, influencing the consideration of al-Kamil's peace offerings. Then in July 1221, rumors began that the army of one King David, a descendant of the legendary Prester John, was on its way from the east to the Holy Land to join the Crusade and gain release of the sultan's Christian captives. The story soon grew to such proportions and generated so much excitement among the Crusaders that it led them to prematurely launch an attack on Cairo. In reality, these rumors were conflated with the reality of Genghis Khan and the Mongol invasions of Persia.

On 4 July 1221 Pelagius, having decided to advance to the south, ordered a three-day fast in preparation for the advance. John of Brienne, arriving in Egypt shortly thereafter, argued against the move, but was powerless to stop it. Already deemed a traitor for opposing the plans and threatened with excommunication, John joined the force under the command of the legate. They moved towards Fariskur on 12 July where Pelagius drew it up in battle formation.

The Crusader force advanced to Sharamsah, half-way between Fariskur and Mansurah on the east bank of the Nile, occupying the city on 12 July 1221. John of Brienne again attempted to turn the legate back, but the Crusader force was intent on gaining great booty from Cairo, and John would likely have been put to death if he persisted. On 24 July, Pelagius moved his forces near the al-Bahr as-Saghit (Ushmum canal), south of the village of Ashmun al-Rumman, on the opposite bank from Mansurah. His plan was to maintain supply lines with Damietta, not bringing sufficient food for his large army.

The fortifications established were less than ideal, made worse by the reinforcements the Egyptians brought in from Syria. Alice of Cyprus and the leaders of the military orders warned Pelagius of the large numbers of Muslims troops arriving and continued warnings from John of Brienne went unheeded. Many Crusaders took this opportunity to retreat back to Damietta, later departing for home.

The Egyptians had the advantage of knowing the terrain, especially the canals near the Crusader camp. One such canal near Barāmūn (see maps of the area here and here) could support large vessels in late August when the Nile was at its crest, and they brought numerous ships up from al-Maḥallah. Entering the Nile, they were able to block the Crusaders' line of communications to Damietta, rendering their position untenable. In consultation with his military leaders, Pelagius ordered a retreat, only to find the route to Damietta blocked by the sultan's troops.

On 26 August 1221, the Crusaders attempted to reach Barāmūn under the cover of darkness, but their carelessness alerted the Egyptians who set on them. They were also reluctant to sacrifice their stores of wine, drinking them rather than leave them. In the meantime, al-Kamil had the sluices along the right bank of the Nile opened, flooding the area and rendering battle impossible. On 28 August, Pelagius sued for peace, sending an envoy to al-Kamil.

The Crusaders still had some leverage. Damietta was well-garrisoned and a naval squadron under fleet admiral Henry of Malta, and Sicilian chancellor Walter of Palearia and German imperial marshal Anselm of Justingen, had been sent by Frederick II. They offered the sultan withdrawal from Damietta and an eight-year truce in exchange for allowing the Crusader army to pass, the release of all prisoners, and the return of the relic of the True Cross. Prior to the formal surrender of Damietta, the two sides would maintain hostages, among them John of Brienne and Hermann of Salza for the Franks side and as-Salih Ayyub, son of al-Kamil, for Egypt.

The masters of the military orders were dispatched to Damietta with the news of the surrender. It was not well-received, with the Venetians attempting to gain control, but the eventual happened on 8 September 1221. The Crusader ships departed and the sultan entered the city. The Fifth Crusade was over, a dismal failure.

== Aftermath ==
The Fifth Crusade ended with nothing gained for the West, with much loss of life, resources and reputations. Most were bitter that offensive operations were begun prior to the arrival of the emperor's forces, and had opposed the treaty. Walter of Palearia was stripped of his possessions and sent into exile. Admiral Henry of Malta was imprisoned only to be pardoned later by Frederick II. John of Brienne demonstrated his inability to command an international army and was censured for essentially deserting the Crusade in 1220. Pelagius was accused of ineffectual leadership and a misguided view that led him to reject the sultan's peace offering. The greatest criticism was leveled at Frederick II, whose ambition clearly lay in Europe not the Holy Land. The Crusade was unable to even gain the return of the piece of the True Cross. The Egyptians could not find it and the Crusaders left empty-handed.

== Participants ==
A partial list of those that participated in the Fifth Crusade can be found in the category collections of Christians of the Fifth Crusade and Muslims of the Fifth Crusade.

== Historiography ==
The historiography of the Fifth Crusade is concerned with the "history of the histories" of the military campaigns discussed herein as well as biographies of the important figures of the period. The primary sources include works written in the medieval period, generally by participants in the Crusade or written contemporaneously with the event. The secondary sources begin with early consolidated works in the 16th century and continuing to modern times. The tertiary sources are primarily encyclopedias, bibliographies and biographies/genealogies.

The primary Western sources of the Fifth Crusade were first complied in Gesta Dei per Francos (God's Work through the Franks) (1611), by French scholar and diplomat Jacques Bongars. These include several eyewitness accounts, and are as follows.

- Estoire d'Eracles empereor (History of Heraclius) is an anonymous history of Jerusalem down to 1277, a continuation of William of Tyre's work and drawing from both Ernoul and the Rothelin Continuation.
- Historia Orientalis (Historia Hierosolymitana) and Epistolae, by theologian and historian Jacques de Vitry.
- Historia Damiatina, by Cardinal Oliver of Paderborn (Oliverus scholasticus) reflects his experience in the Crusade.
- De Itinere Frisonum is an eyewitness account of the Frisians' journey from Friesland to Acre.
- Flores Historiarum, by English chronicler Roger of Wendover, covering the period from 1188 through the Fifth Crusade.
- Gesta crucigerorum Rhenanorum, an account of the Rhineland Crusaders in 1220.
- Gesta Innocentii III, written by a member of the pope's curia.
- Chronicon, by Richard of San Germano.

Other primary sources include:

- De expugnatione Salaciae carmen by Goswin of Bossut
- Gesta obsidionis Damiate by Giovanni Codagnello

The Arabic sources of the Crusade, partially compiled in the collection Recueil des historiens des croisades, Historiens orientaux (1872–1906), include the following.

- Complete Work of History, particularly The Years 589–629/1193–1231, by Ali ibn al-Athir, an Arab or Kurdish historian.
- Kitāb al-rawḍatayn (The Book of the Two Gardens) and its sequel al-Dhayl ʿalā l-rawḍatayn, by Arab historian Abū Shāma.
- Tarikh al-Mukhtasar fi Akhbar al-Bashar (History of Abu al-Fida), by Kurdish historian Abu'l-Fida.
- History of Egypt, by Egyptian historian Al-Makrizi.
- History of the Patriarchs of Alexandria, begun in the 10th century, and continued into the 13th century.

Many of these primary sources can be found in Crusade Texts in Translation. Fifteenth century Italian chronicler Francesco Amadi wrote his Chroniques d'Amadi that includes the Fifth Crusade based on the original sources. German historian Reinhold Röhricht also compiled two collections of works concerning the Fifth Crusade: Scriptores Minores Quinti Belli sacri (1879) and its continuation Testimonia minora de quinto bello sacro (1882). He also collaborated on the work Annales de Terre Sainte that provides a chronology of the Crusade correlated with the original sources.

The reference to the Fifth Crusade is relatively new. Thomas Fuller called it simply Voyage 8 in his The Historie of the Holy Warre. Joseph-François Michaud referred to it as part of the Sixth Crusade in his Histoire des Croisades (translation by British author William Robson), as did Joseph Toussaint Reinaud in his Histoire de la sixième croisade et de la prise de Damiette. Historian George Cox in his The Crusades regarded the Fifth and Sixth Crusades as a single campaign, but by the late 19th century, the designation of the Fifth Crusade was standard.

The secondary sources are well-represented in the Bibliography, below. Tertiary sources include works by Louis Bréhier in the Catholic Encyclopedia, Ernest Barker in the Encyclopædia Britannica, and Philip Schaff in the Schaff–Herzog Encyclopedia of Religious Knowledge. Other works include The Mohammedan Dynasties by Stanley Lane-Poole and Bréhier's Crusades (Bibliography and Sources), a concise summary of the historiography of the Crusades.

== Bibliography ==
- Abulafia, David (1992). Frederick II: A Medieval Emperor. Oxford University Press. ISBN 0195080408.
- Archer, Thomas Andrew (1904). The Crusades: The Story of the Latin Kingdom of Jerusalem. Putnam.
- Asbridge, Thomas (2012). The Crusades: The War for the Holy Land. Simon & Schuster. ISBN 978-1849836883.
- Barker, Ernest (1923). The Crusades. World's manuals. Oxford University Press, London.
- Barroca, Mário Jorge (2006). Portugal. The Crusades – An Encyclopedia, pp. 979–984.
- Bird, Jessalyn (2006). Damietta. The Crusades – An Encyclopedia, pp. 343–344.
- Brady, Kathleen (2021). Francis and Clare: the Struggles of the Saints of Assisi. Lodwin Press, New York. ISBN 978-1565482210.
- Cahen, Claude (1968). Pre-Ottoman Turkey. Taplinger Publishing Company. ISBN 978-1597404563.
- Cahen, Claude (1969). Mongols and the Near East (PDF). A History of the Crusades (Setton), Volume II. Archived from the original (PDF) on 2024-03-13.
- Cahen, Claude (2012). Ayyūbids (2nd ed.). Encyclopaedia of Islam. ISBN 978-9004161214.
- Cassidy-Welch, Megan (2019). War and Memory at the Time of the Fifth Crusade. Pennsylvania State University Press.
- Christie, Niall (2014). Muslims and Crusaders: Christianity's Wars in the Middle East, 1095–1382, from the Islamic Sources. Routledge. ISBN 978-1138543102.
- Coureas, Nicholas (2017). "The Events of the Fifth Crusade according to the Cypriot Chronicle of "Amadi"". Crusades – Subsidia 9 Chapter 13 185–192. The Fifth Crusade in Context, Mylod (ed.).
- Cox, George William (1891). The Crusades. Epochs of history. Longmans, London.
- Delaville Le Roulx, Joseph (1904). Les Hospitaliers en Terre Sainte et à Chypre (1100–1310). E. Leroux, Paris.
- Donovan, Joseph P. (1950). Pelagius and the Fifth Crusade. University of Pennsylvania Press. ISBN 978-1512801491.
- Érszegi, Géza; Solymosi, László (1981). "Az Árpádok királysága, 1000–1301 [The Monarchy of the Árpáds, 1000–1301]". In Solymosi, László (ed.). Magyarország történeti kronológiája, I: a kezdetektől 1526-ig [Historical Chronology of Hungary, Volume I: From the Beginning to 1526] (in Hungarian). Akadémiai Kiadó. pp. 79–187. ISBN 963-05-2661-1.
- Fuller, Thomas (1639). The Historie of the Holy Warre. W. Pickering, London.
- Fulton, Michael S. (2018). Artillery in the Era of the Crusades. Brill Publications. ISBN 978-9004349452.
- Furber, Elizabeth Chapin (1969). The Kingdom of Cyprus, 1191–1291 (PDF). A History of the Crusades (Setton), Volume II. Archived from the original (PDF) on 2023-03-26.
- Gibb, H. A. R. (1969). The Aiyūbids (PDF). A History of the Crusades (Setton), Volume II. Archived from the original (PDF) on 2023-03-26.
- Humphreys, R. Stephen (1977). From Saladin to the Mongols: The Ayyubids of Damascus, 1193–1260. State University of New York. ISBN 978-0873952637.
- Humphreys, R. Stephen (1987). Ayyubids. Encyclopedia Iranica, Vol. III, Fasc. 2, pp. 164–167.
- Jackson, Peter (2002). Mongols. Encyclopedia Iranica.
- Koch, Adolf (1885). Hermann von Salza, Meister des deutschen Ordens. Verlag von Duncker & Humblot, Leipzig.
- Lane-Poole, Stanley (1894). The Mohammedan dynasties: chronological and genealogical tables with historical introductions. A. Constable & Co., Westminster.
- Lane-Poole, Stanley (1901). History of Egypt in the Middle Ages. A History of Egypt; v. 6. Methuen, London. ISBN 978-0790532042.
- Lock, Peter (2006). The Routledge Companion to the Crusades. Routledge. doi:10.4324/9780203389638. ISBN 0415393124.
- Longnon, Jean (1978). Les compagnons de Villehardouin: Recherches sur les croisés de la quatrième croisade. Librairie Droz.
- Maalouf, Amin (2006). The Crusades through Arab Eyes. Saqi Books. ISBN 978-0863560231.
- Madden, Thomas F. (2013). The Concise History of the Crusades. Rowman & Littlefield. ISBN 978-1442215764.
- Maier, Christoph T. (1998). Preaching the Crusades: Mendicant Friars and the Cross in the Thirteenth Century. Cambridge University Press. ISBN 0521452465.
- Marvin, Laurence (2024). The Damietta Crusade, 1217-1221. Oxford University Press. ISBN 9780198916178.
- Michaud, Joseph François (1881). The History of the Crusades (Histoire des Croisades). George Routledge and Sons, London.
- Mikaberidge, Alexander (2006). Georgia. The Crusades – An Encyclopedia. pp. 511–513.
- Mills, Charles (1820). History of the Crusades for the Recovery and Possession of the Holy Land. Printed for Longman, Hurst, Rees, Orme, and Brown.
- Moses, Paul (2009). The Saint and the Sultan: The Crusades, Islam, and Francis of Assisi's Mission of Peace. Doubleday. ISBN 978-0385523707.
- Murray, Alan V. (2006). The Crusades – An Encyclopedia. ABC-CLIO. ISBN 978-1576078624.
- Mylod, M. J. (2017). The Fifth Crusade in Context: The Crusading Movement in the Early Thirteenth Century. Routledge. doi:10.4324/9781315574059. ISBN 978-0367880354.
- Nicolle, David (2006). Mansurah. The Crusades – An Encyclopedia, pp. 794–795.
- Oliphant, Margaret (1907). Francis of Assisi. Macmillan, London.
- Perry, Guy (2013). John of Brienne: King of Jerusalem, Emperor of Constantinople, c. 1175–1237. Cambridge University Press. ISBN 978-1107043107.
- Powell, James M. (1986). Anatomy of a Crusade, 1213–1221. University of Pennsylvania. ISBN 978-0812213232.
- Powell, James M. (2006). "Fifth Crusade (1217–1221)". The Crusades: An Encyclopedia. pp. 427–432.
- Reinaud, Joseph Toussaint (1826). Histoire de la sixième croisade et de la prise de Damiette. Dondey-Dupré.
- Richard, Jean C. (1999). The Crusades, c. 1071 – c. 1291. Cambridge University Press. ISBN 978-0521625661.
- Röhricht, Reinhold (1884). Annales de Terre Sainte, 1095–1291. E. Leroux, Paris.
- Röhricht, Reinhold (1891). Studien zur Geschichte des fünften Kreuzzuges. Wagner, Innsbrück.
- Roy, J. J. E. (1853). Histoire des Templiers. A. Mame, Tours.
- Runciman, Steven (1954). A History of the Crusades, Volume Three: The Kingdom of Acre and the Later Crusades. Cambridge University Press. ISBN 978-0521347723.
- Setton, Kenneth M. (1969). A History of the Crusades. Six Volumes. University of Wisconsin Press.
- Slack, Corliss K. (2013). Historical Dictionary of the Crusades. Scarecrow Press. ISBN 978-0810878303.
- Smith, Thomas W. (2026). The Fifth Crusade: A History of the Epic Campaign to Conquer Egypt. Yale University Press. ISBN 978-0-300-28395-2.
- Tolan, John V. (2009). Saint Francis and the Sultan: The Curious History of a Christian-Muslim Encounter. Oxford University Press. ISBN 978-0199239726.
- Tyerman, Christopher (1996). England and the Crusades, 1095–1588. University of Chicago Press. ISBN 0226820122.
- Tyerman, Christopher (2006). God's War: A New History of the Crusades. Belknap Press. ISBN 978-0674023871.
- Van Cleve, Thomas C. (1969) [1962]. "The Fifth Crusade". In Kenneth M. Setton; Robert Lee Wolff; Harry W. Hazard (eds.). A history of the Crusades (PDF). Vol. II (2nd ed.). Madison: University of Wisconsin Press. ISBN 0299048446. Archived from the original (PDF) on 2023-03-26.
- Villegas-Aristizábal, Lucas (2018). "Did Savary of Mauléon Participate in Alfonso IX's Failed Siege of Cáceres in 1218?". De Medio Aevo. 6 (12): 99–118.
- Villegas-Aristizábal, Lucas (2019). Was the Portuguese Led Military Campaign Against Alcácer do Sal in the Autumn of 1217 Part of the Fifth Crusade?, Al-Masāq: Journal of the Medieval Mediterranean, 29 Issue 1. pp. 50–67. doi:10.1080/09503110.2018.1542573. S2CID 165784582.
- Villegas-Aristizábal, Lucas (2021) [2018]. "A Frisian Perspective on Crusading in Iberia as Part of the Sea Journey to the Holy Land, 1217–1218, Studies in Medieval and Renaissance History, 3rd Series 15". Studies in Medieval and Renaissance History: 67–149.
- Veszprémy, László (2002). The Crusade of Andrew II, King of Hungary, 1217–1218 (PDF). Iacobus. Archived from the original (PDF) on 2019-10-18.
- Weiler, Björn K. U. (2006). "Frederick II of Germany". The Crusades: An Encyclopedia. pp. 475–477.
- Wilson, Jonathan, ed. (2021). The Conquest of Santarém and Goswin's Song of the Conquest of Alcácer do Sal: Editions and Translations of De expugnatione Scalabis and Gosuini de expugnatione Salaciae carmen. Crusade Texts in Translation. Routledge.
- Wolff, Robert Lee (1969). The Latin Empire of Constantinople, 1204–1312 (PDF). A History of the Crusades (Setton), Volume II. Archived from the original (PDF) on 2023-03-26.
