= Asukai Masaaki =

Asukai Masaaki refers to two separate Japanese waka poets, both members of the prestigious Asukai family, whose names are written with different kanji.

- Asukai Masaaki (13th century) (飛鳥井雅顕)
- Asukai Masaaki (17th century) (飛鳥井雅章)
