= Peter of Montaigu =

Peter of Montagut

Grand Master of the Knights Templar
- In office 1218–1232
- Preceded by: Guillaume de Chartres
- Succeeded by: Armand de Périgord

Personal details
- Died: After 1232

Military service
- Allegiance: Knights Templar
- Battles/wars: Reconquista; Siege of Al-Dāmūs; Fifth Crusade; Siege of Damietta

Peter of Montaigu was the grand master of the Knights Templar from 1218 until his death on 28 January 1232. He took part in the Fifth Crusade and was against the sultan of Egypt's conditions for raising the siege of Damietta. He was previously master of the Templars of the Crown of Aragon.

== Personal details ==
A close friend of William of Chartres, it was most likely the trust the previous grand master had in him which meant he himself was elected so quickly in 1218. At the same time, the grand master of the Knights Hospitaller was Garin of Montaigu, who is likely to have been Peter's brother. The close relationship between the two military orders during this period was probably a result of this. Another brother was the archbishop of Nicosia, Eustorge.

== Military record ==
His actions against the Muslim forces working for the capture of Jerusalem were so effective, that they were forced to propose a surrender. In return for the Templars calling off their siege at Damietta, the Islamic forces would return many Frankish soldiers, halt attacks on Jerusalem and most importantly, return the part of the True Cross, captured from the Europeans at the Battle of Hattin. Catholic pressure meant the Muslim terms were refused and the carnage continued. His military victories, aided by the Hospitaller knights, made him a renowned warrior.

== Notes ==
Religious titles
Preceded by William of Chartres	Grand Master of the Knights Templar; 1218–1232	Succeeded by Armand de Périgord
