= Asukai family =

Japanese noble family

Asukai 飛鳥井
- Parent house: Fujiwara clan
- Founder: Fujiwara no Masatsune

The Asukai family (飛鳥井家 Asukai-ke) was a Japanese noble family.

The family began in the early Kamakura period as a cadet branch of the Fujiwara clan, being founded by Fujiwara (Asukai) no Masatsune. The family excelled at waka poetry and playing kemari (an ancient Japanese sport similar to soccer), as well as calligraphy.

They had a hand in several of the imperial anthologies of waka, and had close ties to the Kamakura and Muromachi shogunates.

== History ==
The Asukai family were a branch of the Fujiwara clan, and were known especially for their skill at composing waka poetry and playing kemari (Japanese football). Their founder was Fujiwara no Masatsune, a grandson of the great poet and kemari player Nanba Yorisuke. The family's name was derived from a Kanji 井, meaning a well in Japanese, particularly, the well of Asuka (飛鳥井 asuka-i) located near Masatsune's residence.

Masatsune was an early ally of the Kamakura shogunate, but also earned the favour of Emperor Go-Toba. He was selected as one of the compilers of the Shin-Kokin Wakashū, and also had a distinguished political career, thus laying the foundations for the future prosperity of his house.

Masatsune, his son Norisada (飛鳥井教定), grandson Masaari (飛鳥井雅有), great-grandson Masaaki (飛鳥井雅顕), great-great-grandson Masataka (飛鳥井雅孝) continued to maintain a close relationship with the shogunate, and Masataka's descendants Masaie (飛鳥井雅家) and Masayori (飛鳥井雅縁) assisted the Ashikaga shōguns. With the downfall of the Nijō family, the Asukai and Reizei families became the two great houses of waka poetry.

Masayori's son Masayo (飛鳥井雅世) was entrusted by the shōgun Ashikaga Yoshinori to compile the Shinshoku Kokin Wakashū, an imperial anthology. Masayo's sons Masachika (飛鳥井雅親) and Masayasu (飛鳥井雅康) both became the confidants of Ashikaga Yoshimasa and Yoshihisa, and were influential figures in the court-samurai poetic world that developed at that time. The prominence they achieved continued until well into the Edo period.

== Family Tree ==
adoption
Nanba Yoritsune (d. 1217)
Masatsune^{(1)} (1170-1221)
Norisada^{(2)} (1210-1266)
Masaari^{(3)} (1241-1301)	Motonaga
Masataka^{(4)} (1283-1353)
Masaie^{(5)} (d. 1385)
Masayori^{(6)} (1358-1428)
Masayo^{(7)} (1390-1452)
Masachika^{(8)} (1417-1491)
Masatoshi^{(9)} (1462-1523)
Masatsuna^{(10)} (1489-1571)
Masaharu^{(11)} (1520-1594)
Masaatsu^{(12)} (1548-1578)
Masatsune^{(13)} (1569-1616)
Masatane^{(14)} (1587-1651)
Masaaki^{(15)} (1611-1679)
Masatomo^{(16)} (1630-1645)
Masanao^{(17)} (1635-1662)
Masatoyo^{(18)} (1664-1712)	Saionji Munesue (1683-1756)
Daughter of Asukai Masatoyo	Masaka^{(19)} (1703-1765)
Masashige^{(20)} (1703-1765)
Masatake^{(21)} (1758-1810)
Masamitsu^{(22)} (1782-1851)
Masahisa^{(23)} (1800-1857)
Masanori^{(24)} (1825-1883)
Masamochi^{(25)} (1842-1906)
Hisamaro^{(26)} (1859-1924)
Masanobu^{(27)} (1893-1969)
Masamichi^{(28)} (1934-2000)
Masatomo^{(29)} (b. 1962)

== Poetry ==
Their poetic tastes and style was similar to that of the Nijō poetic school, and their numerous poems and writings on poetic theory (karon) had a strong influence on the poets of later generations.

== Calligraphy ==
Masachika founded the so-called Asukai School (飛鳥井流 Asukai-ryū) or Eiga School (栄雅流 Eiga-ryū) of Japanese calligraphy.

== Works cited ==
- Itō, Kei (1983). "Asukai-ke". Nihon Koten Bungaku Daijiten 日本古典文学大辞典 (in Japanese). Vol. 1. Tokyo: Iwanami Shoten. p. 52. OCLC 11917421.
