= Dekernes =

Town in Dakahlia, Egypt

Dekernes دكرنس
- Town
- Location in Egypt
- Coordinates: 31°5′18″N 31°35′49″E
- Country: Egypt
- Governorate: Dakahlia

Area
  - Total: 238.6 km^{2} (92.1 sq mi)
- Elevation: 8 m (26 ft)

Population (2023)
  - Total: 381,651
  - Density: 1,600/km^{2} (4,143/sq mi)
- Time zone: UTC+2 (EET)
  - Summer (DST): UTC+3 (EEST)
- Area code: (+20) 50

Dekernes (Egyptian Arabic: دكرنس [deˈkeɾnes]) is a town in the center of the Dakahlia Governorate of Egypt. It is situated about 20 km east of Mansoura, the capital of Dakahlia.

== Etymology ==
The town's name is pre-Arabic, but the exact etymology is unknown. Czapkiewicz suggests that it is derived from a Hellenised version of Ancient Egyptian: tꜣ-qrnr, lit. 'land of Qerner (an epithet of Osiris)' through Coptic: ⲧⲉⲕⲉⲣⲛⲓϭ/ⲧⲉⲕⲉⲣⲛⲓ.

== Education ==
The town is home to one of the oldest High schools in Egypt, Ali Mubarak School, which was built in 1911.

== Geography ==
The town is located about 20 km east of Mansoura, the capital of Dakahlia.

=== Climate ===
Dekernes is classified by Köppen-Geiger climate classification system as hot desert (BWh).

Climate data for Dekernes
Month	Jan	Feb	Mar	Apr	May	Jun	Jul	Aug	Sep	Oct	Nov	Dec	Year
Mean daily maximum °C (°F)	17.9 (64.2)	19 (66)	21.5 (70.7)	25.4 (77.7)	30.1 (86.2)	31.7 (89.1)	31.9 (89.4)	32.2 (90.0)	30.9 (87.6)	28.2 (82.8)	24.4 (75.9)	19.7 (67.5)	26.1 (78.9)
Daily mean °C (°F)	12.5 (54.5)	13.4 (56.1)	15.6 (60.1)	18.9 (66.0)	22.8 (73.0)	25.2 (77.4)	26.5 (79.7)	26.6 (79.9)	25.1 (77.2)	22.9 (73.2)	19.3 (66.7)	14.5 (58.1)	20.3 (68.5)
Mean daily minimum °C (°F)	7.2 (45.0)	7.8 (46.0)	9.8 (49.6)	12.4 (54.3)	15.5 (59.9)	18.7 (65.7)	21.1 (70.0)	21 (70)	19.3 (66.7)	17.7 (63.9)	14.3 (57.7)	9.4 (48.9)	14.5 (58.1)
Average precipitation mm (inches)	15 (0.6)	9 (0.4)	6 (0.2)	4 (0.2)	3 (0.1)	0 (0)	0 (0)	0 (0)	0 (0)	5 (0.2)	8 (0.3)	11 (0.4)	61 (2.4)
Source: Climate-Data.org

== Villages ==
Location of Dekernes

Dekernes is the main city in markaz Dekernes. It is surrounded by many small villages which form a part of markaz Dekernes such as:

Local unit of Demouh:

- Demouh
- El Qibab El Kubra
- El Qibab El Sughra
- Kafr El Qibab
- El Gazeera
- Meit Dhafer
- El Mersaah
- Kafr Abdel Mo'men

Local unit of Demeshalt:

- Demeshalt
- Meit El Nahhal
- Kafr El Baz

Local unit of Negeir:

- Negeir
- El Qalyubiya
- El Azazna
- Kafr Abu Nasser

Others:

- El Mahmoudiya
- Manshat Abdel-Rahman
- Ashmun El Rumman (According to Gauthier, the original village name was "Chemoun Erman", a Coptic name, from which today's name is derived)
- Mit Tareif
- Mit Sudan
- Mit Sewiyd
- Mit Sharaf
- Mit Fares

== Notable people ==
- Sami Al-Adl, an actor and producer.

== Projects ==
In 2018 money was earmarked by the Egyptian Government for infrastructure projects in Dekernes.
