= Asukai Masatsune =

Japanese poet (1170–1221)

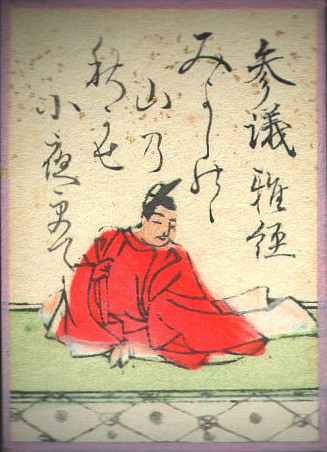
Asukai Masatsune, from the Ogura Hyakunin Isshu.

Asukai Masatsune (飛鳥井雅経; 1170–1221) was a Japanese waka poet of the early Kamakura period. He was also an accomplished kemari player. and one of his poems was included in the Ogura Hyakunin Isshu.

He was a son of Nanba Yoritsune (難波頼経; Japanese Wikipedia), and the ancestor of the Asukai family, who were known for their skill at both poetic composition and kemari. Being of Fujiwara stock, he was also known as Fujiwara no Masatsune (藤原雅経). Among his grandchildren was the poet Masaari. He made a private collection, the Asukai-shū, which was posthumously edited by his grandson in 1292. Twenty-two of his poems were included in the Shin Kokin Wakashū, and a total of 134 in the imperial anthologies.

== Political career ==
Masatsune served three emperors, Go-Toba, Tsuchimikado and Juntoku, in addition to working under the Kamakura shogunate.

== Poetry ==
Masatsune studied waka under Fujiwara no Shunzei and from 1201 served in the Poetry Bureau (和歌所, Waka-dokoro). He served as one of the compilers of the Shin Kokin Wakashū, along with Shunzei's son Teika. Some twenty-two of his own poems were included in the imperial collection. A total of 134 of his poems were included in it and later imperial collections. He also compiled a private waka collection, the Asukai-shū (明日香井集; also called Asukai Wakashū, 明日香井和歌集), which was edited by his grandson Masaari in 1292.

The following poem by him was included as No. 94 in Teika's famous Ogura Hyakunin Isshu:

Japanese text	Romanized Japanese	English translation
み吉野の 山の秋風 さ夜ふけて ふるさと寒く 衣うつなり	Mi-yoshino no yama no aki-kaze sa-yo fukete furu-sato samuku koromo utsu nari	The autumn wind blowing down the mountain brings on the night. At the old capital of Yoshino it gets colder, and I can hear pounding— cloth being fulled.

== Bibliography ==
- McMillan, Peter. 2010 (1st ed. 2008). One Hundred Poets, One Poem Each. New York: Columbia University Press.
- Suzuki Hideo, Yamaguchi Shin'ichi, Yoda Yasushi. 2009 (1st ed. 1997). Genshoku: Ogura Hyakunin Isshu. Tokyo: Bun'eidō.
