= Oliver of Paderborn =

German bishop, crusader, and chronicler

Oliver of Paderborn, also known as Oliver Scholasticus or Oliver of Cologne (c. 1170 – 11 September 1227), was a German cleric, crusader and chronicler. He was the bishop of Paderborn from 1223 until 1225, when Pope Honorius III made him cardinal-bishop of Sabina. He was the first Paderborn bishop to become a cardinal. Oliver played a significant role in the Crusades as a preacher, participant and chronicler.

== Early life ==
He probably came from Westphalia or Friesland. Since 1196 he belonged to the Paderborn Cathedral chapter and headed the Paderborn Cathedral school as its director.

From 1202 he was also active as cathedral troubleshooter in Cologne. Around 1205 he became chancellor under Cologne Archbishop Bruno IV.

In 1207 he studied briefly in Paris and then preached the Albigensian Crusade.

From 1209 to 1213 he resided again in the archbishopric of Cologne, where Pope Innocent III called on him to advance the cause of the Fifth Crusade. In the spring of 1214 he began to preach the crusade in the Rhineland, the Netherlands, and Friesland, where he succeeded in recruiting thousands of volunteers who pledged to take up the cross. In Cologne the crusaders began to equip their own fleet.

== Fifth Crusade ==
In 1217 the crusader army set out for the Holy Land. Oliver seems to have joined with the part of this force that traveled along the Rhine and the Rhone to Marseille. From there the crusaders embarked for Outremer. Oliver later reported in his chronicle, Historia Damiatina, the sequence of events that followed. In the Holy Land, when King Andrew of Hungary broke off from the crusade in 1218 and returned to Europe, Oliver's Frisian contingent, which had circumnavigated the Iberian Peninsula and just arrived, persuaded him to continue the crusade by attacking Damietta on Egypt's Nile Delta. In August 1218 the Friesian crusaders distinguished themselves by their success in destroying Damietta's upstream tower, located in the middle of the Nile. This was accomplished with the help of a ship specially modified under the direction of Oliver. In Damietta he also acted as secretary of the papal legate Cardinal Pelagius, the spiritual leader of the crusade.

Oliver wrote in his Historia Damiatina that in 1219: "Before the capture of Damietta there came to our attention a book written in Arabic, in which the author says that he was neither Jew nor Christian nor Saracen." This book was interpreted to have predicted Saladin’s earlier capture of Jerusalem and the impending Christian capture of Damietta. Also "that a certain king of the Christian Nubians was to destroy the city of Mecca and cast out the scattered bones of Mohammed, the false prophet, and certain other things which have not yet come to pass." According to Ahmed Sheir:

This anonymous letter mentioned that the son of Prester John, King David, sent his envoys to release the Christian captives captured in Egypt during the Crusaders’ siege of Damietta, and then they were sent to the Abbasid Caliph in Baghdad as gifts.

This was the first mention of a King David as a descendant of the legendary Nestorian ruler who was going to join with Western Christendom in a combined effort to destroy Islam. The King David story soon grew to such proportions and generated so much excitement among the crusaders that it led them to prematurely launch an attack on Cairo during the Nile flood season, resulting in their complete defeat at the hands of the Muslims.

The book in Arabic that Oliver found is generally believed to be the Arabic Apocalypse of Peter, a Christian work. The book was intended to give hope to the Christian minority in Syria and included multiple coded references to Islam, as well as prophecies of Islam's eventual destruction.

Later, after the crusaders were forced to withdraw from Egypt in September 1221, Oliver remained behind, staying until September or October 1222 in Acre. During this time he sent two letters, one to Sultan al-Kamil of Egypt, the other to the Islamic scholars there, in which he tried with the polemical erudition of his time to convince them to reject of the Muslim faith and accept Christianity in its stead.

== Bishop and cardinal ==
Returning to Germany, from 1223 he preached the Sixth Crusade to be led by Emperor Frederick II.

After the March 28, 1223, death of Bishop Bernhard III of Paderborn, Oliver was elected to replace him. The choice wasn't undisputed, however, and the opposing candidate, Heinrich von Brakel, provost of Busdorf, received the bishop regalia from the king and confirmation from the archbishop of Mainz. But Oliver appealed to the Roman Curia for his rights. And on April 7, 1225, he was finally confirmed as Bishop of Paderborn by Pope Honorius III. However, not being in his diocese but in the vicinity of the pope, he was made Cardinal Bishop of Sabina in September 1225, resulting in the diocese of Paderborn being declared vacant.

In 1227 he joined the crusading army of Emperor Frederick II when it gathered in southern Italy, doing so in the capacity of papal legate. But before he could embark with the army to Outremer, he died on September 11, 1227, in Otranto, a victim of a disease that had broken out in the crusader army.

== Bibliography ==
- Hoogeweg, Hermann (1887). "Oliver von Paderborn". General German Biography. Vol. 24. (ADB). pp. 305–308.
- Weise, Erich (1960). "The Cologne cathedral chief Oliver and the beginnings of the Teutonic Order in Prussia". In Reykers, Hans (ed.). In the shadow of St. Gereon. Cologne: Verlag der Löwe. pp. 385–394.
- von den Brincken, Anna Dorothea (1985). "Islam and Oriens Christianus in the writings of the Cologne cathedral scholastic Olivier". In Zimmermann, Albert; Craemer-Ruegenberg, Ingrid; Vuillemin, Gudrun (eds.). Orientalische Kultur und Europäisches Mittelalter [Oriental Culture in the European Middle Ages]. Miscellanea Mediaevalia. de Gruyter. pp. 86—.
- Giese, Wolfgang (1999). "Oliver von Paderborn". New German Biography. Vol. 19. Berlin: Duncker & Humblot. p. 522. ISBN 3-428-00200-8.
- "Oliverus scholasticus" in the repertory Historical sources of the German Middle Ages, Dieter Deubner: Hermann von Salza and the Kölsch Domscholaster Oliver Moment.
- Miranda, Salvador (2023). "Paderborn, Oliver von". The Cardinals of the Holy Roman Church. Florida International University – via cardinals.fiu.edu.
