= Siege of Damietta (1218–1219) =

Battle in Egypt

- Part of Fifth Crusade
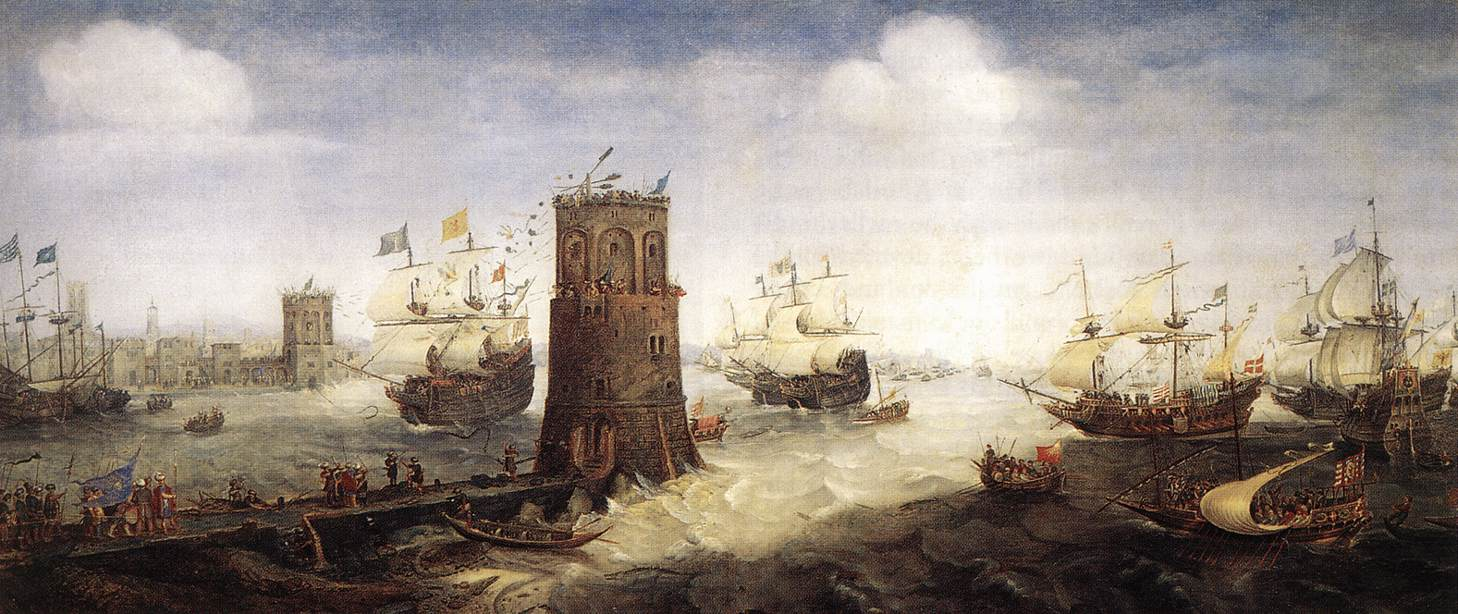
- Crusaders attack the tower of Damietta in a painting by Cornelis Claesz van Wieringen.
Date	1218–1219
Location	Damietta, Egypt
Result	Crusader victory
Territorial changes	Damietta occupied

Belligerents
Crusaders: Holy Roman Empire; Kingdom of Jerusalem; Teutonic Knights; Knights Templar; Knights Hospitaller; Kingdom of France; Kingdom of England	Ayyubid Sultanate of Egypt

Commanders and leaders
Simon III, Count of Saarbrücken	Al-Kamil

Strength
As many as 200 ships	Unknown

Casualties and losses
Unknown	Unknown
- 67,000 inhabitants killed

The siege of Damietta of 1218–1219 was part of the Fifth Crusade in which the Crusaders attacked the Egyptian port city of Damietta. The city was besieged in 1218 and taken by the Crusaders in 1219.

At the beginning of the Fifth Crusade, it was agreed that a force would attempt to take Damietta, located at the mouth of the river Nile. The Crusaders then planned to use this city as a launching point for the southern portion of a pincer attack upon Jerusalem from Acre and Suez. Control over the area would also provide wealth to finance the continuation of the crusade, and reduce the threat from the Egyptian fleet. By 1221, Damietta was lost when Crusader forces surrendered the city and evacuated Egypt.

St Francis of Assisi is believed to have made a well-received but ultimately unsuccessful attempt to convert Egypt's Sultan al-Kamil during the siege.

== Preparation ==
Andrew II of Hungary with his Hungarian contigent, after several failed actions in the Levant such as the siege of Mount Tabor, left the Fifth Crusade for Europe in early 1218. The German crusaders who had also been fighting in the Levant under Andrew and Leopold VI of Austria remained, bolstered by Germans arriving from Italy, and soon joined by a further German and Frisian force sailing all the way from northern German ports, bolstering their strength — the German force had been delayed by a stop in Portugal when the Portuguese convinced them to fight local Muslim forces, and they would participate in the Siege of Alcácer do Sal. The large number of cogs carrying these forces to the Near East were also importantant for the upcoming invasion of Egypt; many were built in the Holy Roman Empire (in places such as Frisia and Cologne), financed by Germans and Frisians for the crusade.

In late May, the forces assigned to besiege Damietta set sail. The first ships arrived on May 27, although the main leaders were delayed by storms and further preparations. The crusading force included groups of the Teutonic Order, Knights Templar and Knights Hospitaller, fleets from Frisia and Italy, and troops amassed under numerous other military leaders.

== Siege ==
=== Arrival ===
Upon the arrival of the first Crusader ships to Damietta, Simon III, Count of Saarbrücken was chosen as a temporary leader until the arrival of the remaining ships. Under his command, the force established a landing site on May 29 "without any loss of blood." Later that day, the remaining ships arrived.

=== The tower of Damietta ===
The first objective of the besieging Christian force, made up mainly of German crusaders, was to take the defensive river tower that protected the fortress of Damietta and anchored one end of a chain across the harbor. However, the approaches to the tower were limited by the large iron chain to the east, and the shallow depth of the river to the west. Assaults upon the tower began on June 24, but they repeatedly failed. As a result, the Crusaders created a new type of naval siege weaponry, sometimes attributed to the chronicler Oliver of Paderborn; two ships (a pair of German cogs) were bound together, and four masts and sailyards were built, with a siege tower and ladder constructed on top. The structure was then covered with a layer of animal skins to protect from enemy attacks. On August 24, the engine was brought to the tower; the next day, the men in the tower surrendered. The use of this remarkable siege engine aided the Crusaders in taking the tower, and opening the way for the fleet to attack the fortress.

=== The city of Damietta ===
The city of Damietta was well fortified, with 3 walls, 28 towers, and a moat.

Once the river tower was captured, the Crusader fleet attempted to support the land forces with an attack on the city from the river. However, Al-Kamil blocked the river with sunken ships, and the crusaders had to spend time clearing out an old canal so that their ships could surround the city. The siege was further slowed by the arrival of winter, storms, disease, and leadership disputes.

In September, Cardinal Pelagius, Bishop of Albano and Legate of the Apostolic See arrived at the Crusader camp (along with him were reinforcements from Rome, England and France) and proceeded to challenge the command of John of Brienne, King of Jerusalem, claiming that the Church held greater authority than a secular leader. To add to their difficulties, in late November 1218, a storm wrecked several of the Crusader ships and destroyed supplies.

However, on February 25, 1219, the Crusaders received welcome news. The Sultan Al-Kamil had retreated, leaving the river bank near the city unoccupied by hostile forces. The Crusaders quickly advanced, occupying the city of Tinnis, and spent the spring and summer fighting the Muslim troops with varying success. On August 29, the Crusaders attempted a large-scale attack on the enemy camp, but they quickly became disorganized and the Sultan's counterattack was fairly successful.

Soon after, a temporary truce was established, and peace terms were offered by the Sultan. The terms were highly favourable to the Crusaders; the Muslim leaders had agreed to surrender the city and kingdom of Jerusalem, the Holy Cross, and all Christian captives in Egypt and Damascus, only withholding the fortresses of Kerak and Montreal. They even agreed to supply funds to repair Jerusalem's walls. King John advocated for accepting the peace terms, backed by the German and French troops. On the other hand, Cardinal Pelagius, backed by the Templars, Hospitallers, and Italians, opposed it. Eventually, the terms were denied, and the fighting continued.

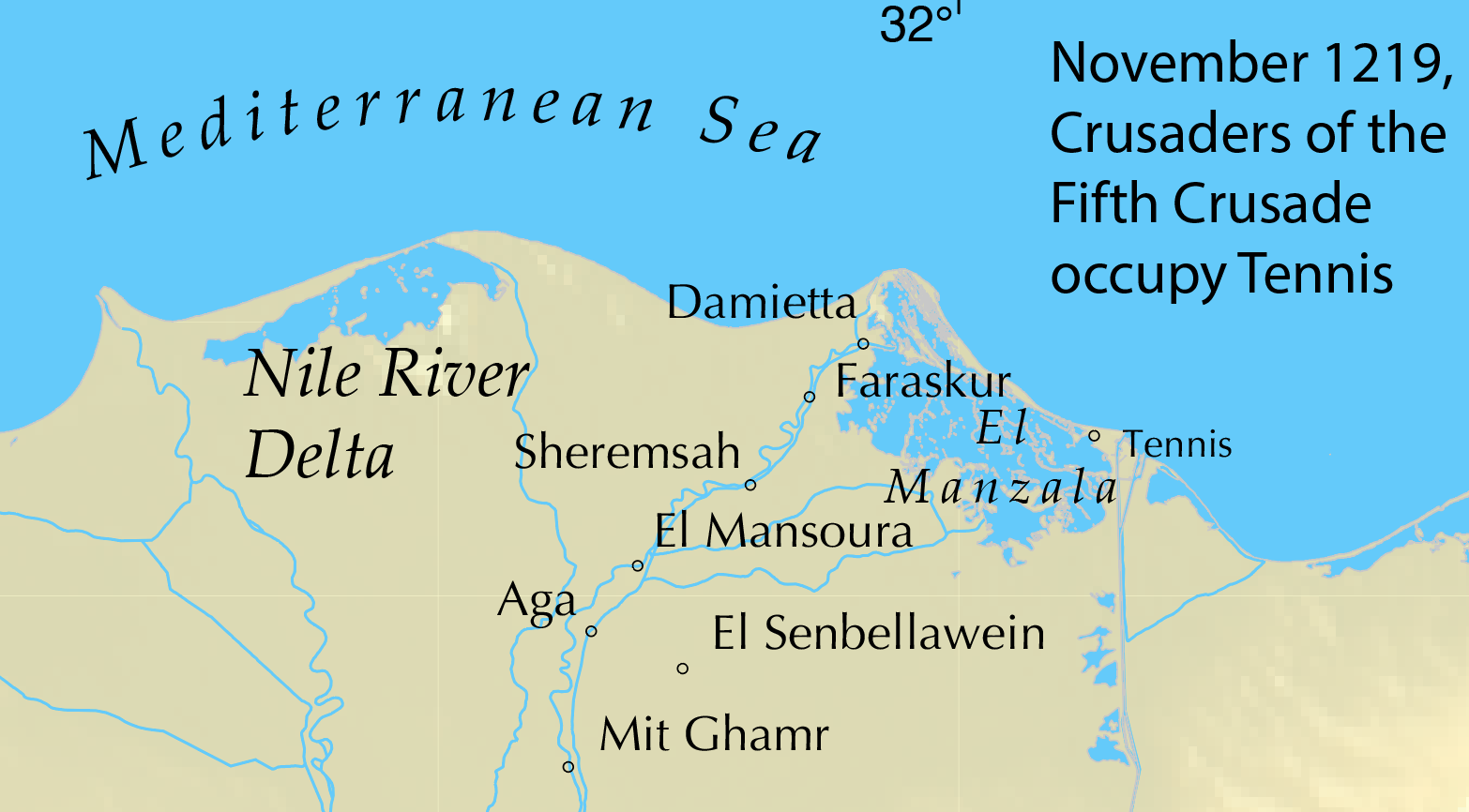

In early November 1219, the Crusaders found the city of Damietta nearly unguarded. Upon entering the walls, they found that the town had been devastated by disease and a lack of supplies. The exact numbers are unclear, but out of the 60,000–80,000 inhabitants prior to the beginning of the siege, less than 10,000 remained alive; some sources recount as few as 3,000 left.

== Aftermath ==
The city of Damietta was held by Crusader forces for another two years after the completion of the siege. During that time, the mosque of Damietta was converted into a cathedral. On February 2, 1220, the Feast of the Purification, Cardinal Pelagius consecrated the building as the Cathedral of the Holy Virgin.

In July 1221, Damietta and the Fifth Crusade were lost. Crusader forces surrendered the city and evacuated Egypt.

== List of Crusaders present ==
- Adolf VI, Count of Berg
- Alamanno da Costa
- Aymar de Lairon
- Erard II of Chacenay
- Gillis Berthout
- Guérin de Montaigu
- Guido I Embriaco
- William of Chartres
- Hugh IX of Lusignan
- Jacques de Vitry
- John de Lacy, Earl of Lincoln
- Milo IV du Puiset
- Peire de Montagut
- Peter of Győr
- Ranulf de Blondeville, Earl of Chester
- Raoul of Mérencourt
- Renaud de Pons
- Robert of Courçon
- Robert Fitzwalter
- Saer de Quincy, Earl of Winchester
- Simone Doria
- Walter III of Caesarea
- William III, Count of Jülich
- Odarique de Michelet

== Sources ==
- Cassidy-Welch, Megan. "'O Damietta': War Memory and Crusade in Thirteenth-Century Egypt." Journal of Medieval History 40, no. 3 (June 2, 2014): 346–60. Accessed April 26, 2018. doi:10.1080/03044181.2014.91783.
- Madden, Thomas F. The New Concise History of the Crusades. Lanham, Md: Rowman & Littlefield, 2006. ISBN 0-7425-3823-0
- Sterling, Douglas. "Crusader Siege in the Nile Delta." Military History 22, no. 5 (August 2005): 46-52
- Sterling, Douglas. "The Siege of Damietta: Seapower in the Fifth Crusade 1217-1221 A.D." In Crusaders, Condottieri, and Cannon: Medieval Warfare in Societies around the Mediterranean, edited by Donald J. Kagay and L. J. Andrew Villalon, 101–29. Boston: Brill, 2003.
- Oliver of Paderborn. The Capture of Damietta. Translated by John J. Gavigan. Philadelphia: University of Pennsylvania Press, 1948.
