= William of Chartres (Templar) =

Grand master of the Knights Templar

14th Grand Master of the Knights Templar
- In office 1210–1218
- Preceded by: Philippe du Plessis
- Succeeded by: Pedro de Montaigu

Personal details
- Born: c. 1178 Champagne, France
- Died: August 1218 (aged 40-42) Damietta, Egypt

Military service
- Allegiance: Knights Templar
- Battles/wars: Fifth Crusade; Siege of Damietta (DOW)

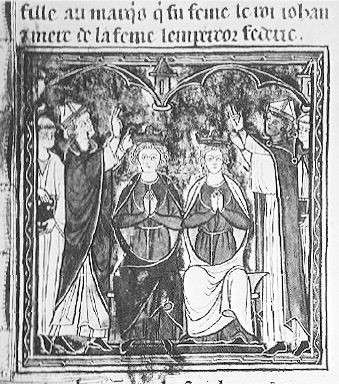
Miniature depicting the coronation of Maria of Montferrat and John of Brienne in 1210

William of Chartres (French: Guillaume; c. 1178 – 1218) was the grand master of the Knights Templar from 1210 until 26 August 1218.

== Biography ==
He was the son of Milo IV, the Count of Bar-sur-Seine.

In 1210, William assisted at the coronation of Jean de Brienne as King of Jerusalem. In 1211, he arbitrated between Leo I of Armenia and the Templars, regarding the castle of Bagras. During the Reconquista, he sent needed supplies and reinforcements to the Christian armies. He sent Templars to fight in the Battle of Las Navas de Tolosa and in the 1217 Siege of Alcázar, leading to the order flourishing in Spain, achieving its zenith of influence in the area. He had contact with the Mongols under Genghis Khan and was accused of treason as a result.

When the Fifth Crusade started in 1217, William led his men in battle, beginning with the Crusaders launching a siege of the Egyptian city of Damietta. The siege lasted eighteen months, with multiple failed assaults on the city and in fighting among crusader leadership spelling disaster for their goals. Muslim reinforcementsmade their way to Damiette, but William led the Templars in successfully repelling them. Although the Crusaders were eventually successful in taking the city, William died in 1218 of pestilence, (possibly endemic typhus), as a consequence of being wounded.

Religious titles
Preceded by Philippe du Plessis	Grand Master of the Knights Templar; 1210–1218	Succeeded by Pedro de Montaigu
