= Siege of Mount Tabor =

1217 engagement between the Crusader armies and Ayyubids

Coordinates: 32°41′14″N 35°23′25″E

Siege of Mount Tabor (1217)
- Part of the Fifth Crusade
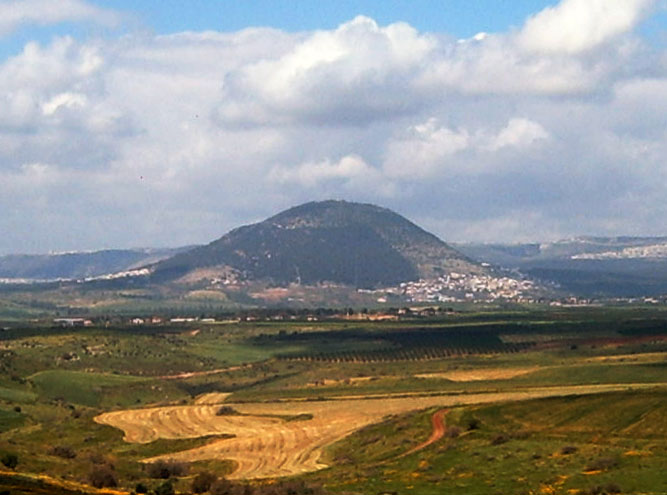
- Mount Tabor
Date	30 November – 7 December 1217
Location	Mount Tabor
Result	Ayyubid victory

Belligerents
Kingdom of Hungary; Holy Roman Empire: Duchy of Austria; Kingdom of Jerusalem; Kingdom of Cyprus; Principality of Antioch; Knights Templar; Knights Hospitaller; Teutonic Order	Ayyubid Dynasty

Commanders and leaders
John of Brienne; Bohemond IV of Antioch; Guérin de Montaigu	Badr al-Din Muhammad Al-Hakkari

Strength
Unknown	2,000 men

Casualties and losses
Heavy	Unknown

The siege of Mount Tabor was a military engagement between the Crusader armies of the Fifth Crusade and the Ayyubids. The combined Crusader armies laid siege to Mount Tabor, which was the objective of the Hungarian Crusade. The crusaders ultimately failed to capture the fort.

== Background ==
In 1215, Pope Innocent III held a council on November 1215 to declare a new crusade, calling to liberate the Christian prisoners and to capture the Muslim fortress at Mount Tabor. The Hungarian king, Andrew II, and the Austrian Duke, Leopold VI, answered the call and began assembling and equipping their armies. Both armies gathered in the Croatian city of Spalato. The Austrians first set sail and arrived in Acre, and 16 days later, the Hungarians arrived in late September 1217.

Leopold invited Bohemond IV of Antioch and his vassals to join him, which he did. The king of Cyprus, Hugh I, arrived in Acre with a large number of Turcopoles. The Austrian and Hungarian armies, along with the King of Jerusalem, Cyprus, Antiochian troops, and the three military orders, launched an offensive to enhance the security of Acre.

They left on November 4 and explored the area around the Mount Tabor fortress. On November 10, they crossed the Jordan River close to the Sea of Galilee and headed north along the shore. They crossed Jacob's Ford once more and made their way back to Acre. They had amassed a sizable amount of loot; they sacked Baisan and looted the city. They had also fulfilled their promise to make a pilgrimage, going to such sacred locations and taking a bath in Jordan.

== Siege ==
After a brief rest, the Crusader armies, without the king of Hungary, launched an attack against Mount Tabor. Led by King John of Brienne, they arrived there on November 30. The fortress at Mount Tabor consisted of 77 towers and had a garrison of 2,000 men, led by Badr al-Din Muhammad Al-Hakkari. It was regarded by Muslims as unconquerable, and only the help of a local convert boy who knew a hidden path to the fort encouraged the Crusaders to attack it. On December 3, Sunday, the Crusaders climbed up the mountain during heavy fog. The Patriarch of Jerusalem led the way while the clergy sang and prayed. The Crusaders came so close to those walls that their lances could touch the walls; however, the Ayyubid garrison quickly became alerted to what was happening and launched a sortie that successfully pushed the Crusaders down the mountain, despite the bravery that King John showed during the fight.

Upon their descent, King John held a council with the Master of Hospitallers and Bohemond, along with the Syrian Barons, who both had disputes regarding the continuation of the siege. Bohemond strongly advocated for abandoning the attack. On December 5, some of the Crusaders, including the Templars and Hospitallers, unsatisfied with the decision of their leaders, decided to launch another attack on the fortress. This time, they placed ladders against the walls; however, the Ayyubids counter-attacked using Greek fire and scattered the Crusaders with heavy losses. Disheartened by this failure, the Crusaders decided to abandon the siege, and on December 7, they withdrew from Mount Tabor and headed to Acre.

== Aftermath ==
Few months later, the Muslims decided to give up the fortress. They destroyed the fort and left, thinking it would be worthless to defend in the long run.

== Sources ==
- Cook, David (2020). Ibn Naẓīf's World-History, Al-Tā’rīkh Al-Manṣūrī. Routledge. ISBN 9781000286144.
- Humphreys, R. Stephen (1977). From Saladin to the Mongols, The Ayyubids of Damascus, 1193–1260. SUNY Press. ISBN 9780873952637.
- Setton, Kenneth (1969). Robert Lee Wolff; Harry W. Hazard (eds.). A History of the Crusades, Volume II: The Later Crusades, 1189–1311 (PDF). The University of Wisconsin Press.
- Veszprémy, László (2002). The Crusade of Andrew II, King of Hungary, 1217–1218. pp. 87–110.
