= George William Cox =

British historian (1827–1902)

- Born: 10 January 1827; Benares, India
- Died: 10 February 1902 (aged 75); Walmer, England
- Occupations: historian and priest

George William Cox (Benares, 10 January 1827 – Walmer, 10 February 1902) was a British historian. He is known for resolving the several myths of Greece and the world into idealisations of solar phenomena. The French poet Stéphane Mallarmé has translated some of his works under the title of Les Dieux antiques (1880).

== Life ==
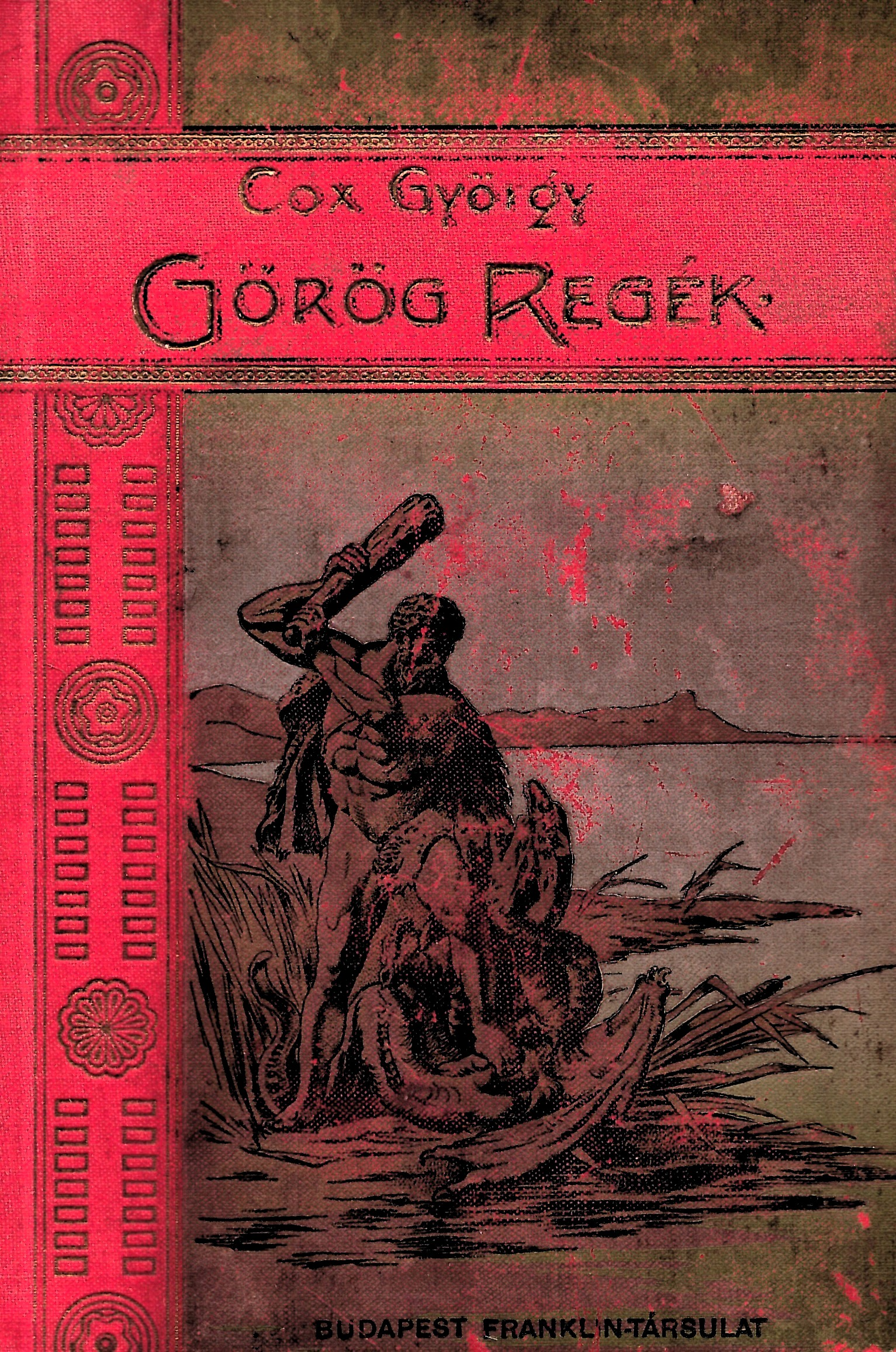
Greek myths. A Hungarian edition, 1911

He was born at Benares on 10 January 1827. He was the eldest son of the six children of Captain George Hamilton Cox (died 1841), of the East India Company's service, and Eliza Kearton, daughter of John Horne, planter, of St. Vincent in the West Indies. A brother, Colonel Edmund Henry Cox of the royal marine artillery, fired the first shot against Sevastopol in the Crimean War.

Sent to England in 1836, Cox attended a preparatory school at Bath and the grammar school, Ilminster. In August 1842, he was admitted to Rugby under Archibald Tait. In 1843, Cox won the senior school scholarship at Rugby, and in 1845 he was elected scholar of Trinity College, Oxford. Although he obtained only a second class in the final classical school in 1848, his scholarship was commended by the examiners. He both graduated B.A. and proceeded M.A. in 1859.

The Oxford Movement excited Cox's sympathy, and in 1850 he was ordained by Dr. Wilberforce, bishop of Oxford. After serving a curacy at Salcombe Regis, he resigned owing to ill-health, and in 1851 accepted the post of English chaplain at Gibraltar. But Cox's high church views, which coloured his Life of Boniface in 1853, met with the disapproval of his bishop, Dr. Tomlinson, and he gladly embraced the opportunity of accompanying John William Colenso on his first visit to South Africa as bishop of Natal (1853-4). On his return to England he became curate of St. Paul's, Exeter, in 1854 and for a year (1859–60) he was a master at Cheltenham.

Cox supported Bishop Colenso in his stand for liberal criticism of the scriptures and in his struggle over his episcopal status in South Africa. He defended Colenso in a long correspondence with F. D. Maurice, and warmly supported the bishop during his stay in England (1863-1865).

In 1880, Cox was appointed Vicar of Bekesbourne by A. C. Tait, archbishop of Canterbury, and from 1881 to 1897, he was rector of the crown living of Scrayingham, Yorkshire. In 1886, he was chosen Bishop of Natal by the adherents of Colenso, but was refused consecration by Archbishop Benson owing to his election being unacceptable to the high church party.

On 18 May 1896, Cox received a civil list pension of £120. He died at Ivy House, Walmer, on 9 February 1902. He had laid claim to the Irish baronetcy of Cox of Dunmanway, and styled himself with the honorific 'Sir'. After his death, however, the Privy Council rejected his son's claim to the baronetcy.

== Published works ==
- 1853: The life of Saint Boniface, Archbishop of Mayence and Apostle of Germany. Joseph Masters.
- 1861: The Great Persian War
- 1861: Tales from Greek Mythology
- 1867: A Manual of Mythology. London: Longmans Green & Co.
- 1870: Latin and Teutonic Christendom. London: Longmans Green & Co.
- 1870: The Mythology of the Aryan Nations, 2 vols., later revised in a one-volume work, 1882
- 1874: The Crusades
- 1874: History of Greece, 2 vols.
- 1876: The Greeks and the Persians. New York: Scribner, Armstrong & Co.
- 1876: The Athenian Empire, 5th edition, 1887. London: Longmans Green & Co.
- 1881: History of the Establishment of British Rule in India. London: Longmans Green & Co.
- 1881: An Introduction to the Science of Comparative Mythology
- 1885: Lives of Greek Statesmen, Solon–Theistokles. New York: Harper & Bros.
- 1886: Lives of Greek Statesmen, Ephialtes–Hermokrates. London: Longmans Green & Co.
- 1887: A Concise History of England
- 1896: The Church of England and the Teaching of Bishop Colenso. London.

Cox's religious principles changed, largely under the influence of historical study. An article in the Edinburgh Review (January 1858) on Milman's History of Latin Christianity illustrates the development of his views on broad church lines.

Cox's association with Colenso gave him abundant material for The Life of Bishop John William Colenso, D.D., Bishop of Natal, which he published in 1888. In the same year he issued a very short vindication of Colenso's views as he understood them, in The Church of England and the Teaching of Bishop Colenso maintaining Colenso's loyalty to the church. (Bishop Colenso's teaching, however, is to be found rather in the Natal Sermons, the first two Series having been recently re-printed in facsimile. The third and fourth Series were published only in South Africa and unfortunately are extremely rare.)

Cox's two-volume biography is the most valuable source for the life of Bishop Colenso because of the large number of letters from the Bishop that it contains. A new edition was published by the Cambridge University Press in 2011. The following year a facsimile edition was also published. (Other major sources include Letters from Natal, written by his scholarly wife.)

His other works includes studies of mythology, and histories of the Greeks and Persians, the Crusades, the establishment of British India, and of England and the English people, as well as a book of "family prayer" based on Jeremy Taylor and other 17th century divines.
