= Asukai Gayū =

Japanese poet (1241–1301)

Asukai Gayū also known as Asukai Masaari (飛鳥井 雅有; 1241 – February 20, 1301) was a Kamakura period nobleman and poet. He lived in Kamakura and occupied a high position in the shogunate (幕府, bakufu). Eighty six of his poems are represented in the official collection Shokukokin Wakashū (続古今和歌集). He also has a personal collection, The Woman Next Door (隣女和歌集, rinjo wakashū).
