= Asukai Masaaki (17th-century poet) =

Asukai Masaaki (飛鳥井雅章, 1611–1679) was a Japanese courtier and waka poet of the early Edo period. His Dharma name was Kukyō-in Gendō Bunga (究竟院原道文雅).

== Biography ==
=== Ancestry, birth and early life ===
Asukai Masaaki was born on the first day of the third month of Keichō 16 (1611), according to the Kugyō Bunin. He was the third son of Asukai Masatsune (ja). His two older brothers had both been banished by imperial command (ja) on the fourth day of the seventh month of 1609, but the younger of the two, Masanori (雅宣), was later pardoned, and raised the young Masaaki.

=== Political career and poetic achievements ===
He was a prominent poet at the court of retired emperor Go-Mizunoo, and from the end of the Kan'ei era in 1644 until a year before his death more than three decades later he virtually monopolized the setting of the topics of poetic gatherings at the imperial palace. In Meireki 3 (1657), he along with three others received the Kokin-juden (secret traditions of interpretation of the Kokinshū) from Go-Mizunoo. Seven years later, he was permitted to hear the same once again.

He was made buke-tensō (court intermediary with the samurai class) in Kanbun 10 (1670). This position required him to travel back and forth between Kyoto and Kantō, and as a result he had many disciples in the eastern regions, especially among the warrior class. He became one of the most prominent waka poets of his era.

At the height of his political career, he had attained the Junior First Rank, and held the position of Provisional Major Counselor (gon-dainagon).

=== Later life and death ===
According to the Kugyō Bunin, he died on the twelfth day of the tenth month of Enpō 7 (1679), when he was in his 69th year. He was cremated at the Kengō-in in northern Kyoto, and was given the Dharma name was Kukyō-in Gendō Bunga.

== Works cited ==
- Ueno, Yōzō (1983). "Asukai Masaaki". Nihon Koten Bungaku Daijiten 日本古典文学大辞典 (in Japanese). Vol. 1. Tokyo: Iwanami Shoten. p. 52. OCLC 11917421.
