= Thomas Andrew Archer =

English historian

- Born: 1853; Stoke on Trent
- Died: 1905 (aged 51–52); Headington

Thomas Andrew Archer, M.A.Oxon. (1853– 1905) was an English historian of the Crusades.

== Biography ==
Archer was baptised on 18 October 1853 in Shelton, Stoke-on-Trent, Staffordshire. He matriculated at the University of Oxford in February 1876 and graduated there B.A. in 1880.

He contributed over 100 articles to the Dictionary of National Biography, 5 articles to the Encyclopædia Britannica, and articles to learned journals such as the English Historical Review. With Charles Lethbridge Kingsford he published in 1894 a book on the Crusades as part of the "History of the Nations" published by T. Fisher Unwin.

When it was announced that Mr. Archer had undertaken the period—hardly the "nation"—of the Crusades, every one who was acquainted with his original and exhaustive researches in mediæval chronicles and romances prepared for a delightful study of a singularly interesting age. Mr. Archer's prolonged illness, however, compelled him to hand over his materials to Mr. Kingsford, whose historical contributions to the "Dictionary of National Biography" had attracted favourable notice; and the result is a joint work in which it is impossible to discriminate between the shares of the two authors.
