= Ulrich II (bishop of Passau) =

34th Bishop of Passau

Ulrich II (died October 31, 1221) was the 34th Bishop of Passau from 1215 and the first prince-bishop from 1217. The Bischof-Ulrich-Straße in Passau is named after him.

Ulrich was the priest of the parish of Falkenstein before serving in the chancellery of Leopold V of Austria from 1193. He then became a skilled protonotary in 1214 to Bishop Manegold of Passau.

On January 21, 1217, Ulrich was given Ilzgau by the Emperor Frederick II to hold as a banner-fief. Thus, the Emperor made him the first Prince-Bishop of the Bishopric of Passau. Ulrich II and his successors were thus henceforth rich princes ex officio. At the end of June 1217, Bishop Ulrich inaugurated in a large feast day the first four altars of Lilienfeld Abbey. In 1219, Ulrich II erected on Georgsberg a castle, the Veste Oberhaus. He also founded several monasteries in the eastern part of the diocese.

Ulrich died on October 31, 1221, on the Fifth Crusade in Damietta, Egypt.

== Bibliography ==
- Lechner, Karl (1976). Die Babenberger: Markgrafen und Herzoge von Österreich 976–1246. Vienna: Böhlau. ISBN 978-3205085089.
- Frenz, Thomas (2000). Wie wird man Bischof von Passau? Urkundentechnische und rechtliche Fragen vom 8. bis zum 19./20. Jahrhundert. Vol. 2. Passau.

Catholic Church titles
| Preceded by Manegold of Berg | Bishop of Passau; 1215–1221 | Succeeded by Gebhard I of Plain |
