= Faraskur =

Faraskur فارسكور
- City
- The Nile Delta

- Location in Egypt
- Coordinates: 31°19′47″N 31°42′53″E
- Country: Egypt
- Governorate: Damietta

Area
  - Total: 122.1 km^{2} (47.1 sq mi)
- Elevation: 2 m (6.6 ft)

Population (2021)
  - Total: 269,724
  - Density: 2,209/km^{2} (5,721/sq mi)
- Time zone: UTC+2 (EET)
  - Summer (DST): UTC+3 (EEST)

Faraskur (Arabic: فارسكور) is a city in Damietta Governorate, Egypt. Before the 1952 revolution it was a part of Dakahlia Governorate.

== Notable people ==
- Riad Al Sunbati

== See also ==
- Battle of Fariskur (1219), during the Fifth Crusade
- Battle of Fariskur (1250), during the Seventh Crusade
