= Sheremsah =

Village in Damietta Governorate, Egypt

Sheremsah شرمساح
- City
- The Nile Delta

- Location in Egypt Sheremsah (Egypt)
- Coordinates: 31.1833335°N 31.6°E
- Country: Egypt
- Governorate: Damietta
- Time zone: UTC+2 (EET)
  - Summer (DST): UTC+3 (EEST)

Sheremsah (Egyptian Arabic: شرمساح) is a village on the Nile in the Damietta governorate. Its name goes back to the ancient Egyptian language. It was used as a camp by withdrawing crusaders during the Seventh Crusade. Its name was mentioned in several books such as:

- Wa Islamah, a historical novel by Ali Ahmad Bakathir.
- Al-Khotat, a book about history and geography of Egypt by Al-maqrizi.
- The Personality of Egypt, A book about the geography of Egypt, by Dr. Gamal Hamdan.

== Notable people ==
The following are some notable people from Sheremash:

- Ibrahim "bey" El-Zohairy, Member of the first Egyptian parliament in 1923.
- Hamza "bey" El-Zohairy.
- Abbas El-Zohairy.
- Ahmed El-Zohairy.
- Adel El-Zohairy.
- Basem El-Zohairy.
- Haytham El-Zohairy.
- Amr El-Zohairy
