= Ashmun al-Rumman =

Village in Dakahlia Governorate, Egypt

Ashmun al-Rumman اشمون الرمان
- Village
- Location in Egypt Ashmun al-Rumman (Egypt)
- Coordinates: 31°5′14″N 31°38′21″E
- Country: Egypt
- Governorate: Dakahlia Governorate
- Elevation: 7 m (23 ft)
- Time zone: UTC+2 (EET)
  - Summer (DST): UTC+3 (EEST)

Ashmun al-Rumman (Arabic: اشمون الرمان Ashmūn ar-Rummān, Coptic: ϣⲙⲟⲩⲛ ⲉⲣⲙⲁⲛ Shmoun Erman) is a village in the markaz of Dekernes in Dakahlia Governorate, Egypt. Known in classical antiquity as Zmoumis (Ancient Greek: Ζμουμις) and in the Islamic Middle Ages as Ushmum-Tannah, Ashmun al-Rumman was formerly a major city, serving as a provincial capital.

== Name ==
Ashmun al-Rumman was known anciently as Zmoumis (Ancient Greek: Ζμουμις). The Coptic name of the city is Shmoun Erman (ϣⲙⲟⲩⲛ ⲉⲣⲙⲁⲛ). In the Middle Ages, before acquiring its current epithet, the city was called Ushmum-Tannah (Arabic: اشمون طنّاح Ushmūm Ṭannāḥ). The first author to use the present name was Abu'l-Fida, who wrote it as Ushmūm ar-Rummān, or "Ushmum of the pomegranates". The name was commonly pronounced Ushmūn in everyday speech during this period.

== History ==
Ancient Zmoumis was located in the Mendesian nome, in the toparchy of Phernouphites. In the second half of the 2nd century CE, Zmoumis was a coastal settlement, with a number of residents engaged in fishing as well as a harbor (limnē).

At the time of Yaqut al-Hamawi, Ashmun al-Rumman was the capital of the province of Dakahlia. At the time of Ibn Ji'an, it was the capital of both Dakahlia and al-Murtahiyah. At the time of the Rauk el-Naçiri, it was part of a region called the ˁamal Ushmūm-Ṭannāḥ, stretching from the areas of Alexandria to Damietta, and comprising the districts of Rosetta and Borollos alongside the provinces of Dakahlia and al-Murtahiya. Ashmun al-Rumman was known for its production of pomegranates, hence the name.

The 1885 Census of Egypt recorded Ashmun al-Rumman (as Achmoun-el-Romman) as a nahiyah in the district of Dekernes in Dakahlia Governorate; at that time, the population of the town was 1,881 (942 men and 939 women).

In 1902, Ashmun al-Rumman was again described as a nahiyah in the district of Dekernes. It was home to 2,429 people (1,220 men and 1,209 women), including 2,331 Muslims and 98 Christians (including 81 Copts). The village's cultivated area covered an area of 776 feddans, and it was irrigated by two canals: the Bahr el Saghir to the north and the Ezz el Dine to the east. Major crops were cotton, wheat, maize, bersim, barley, and rice, as well as dates. There were 3 Muslim kuttabs as well as a Coptic school, two mosques, a steam-powered flour mill, a small post office, looms making wool and cotton cloth, and dye workshops.
