= Pelagio Galvani =

Leonese cardinal and canon lawyer (c.1165–1230)

His Eminence Pelagio Galvani
- Cardinal
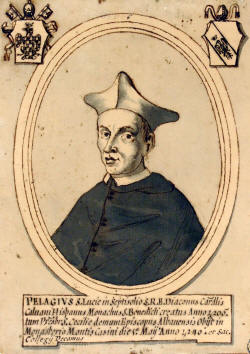
- Church: Roman Catholic

Orders
- Created cardinal: 1205 by Innocent III

Personal details
- Born: c. 1165 Guimarães, Kingdom of Portugal
- Died: 30 January 1230 (aged 64–65) Monte Cassino
- Buried: Monte Cassino
- Coat of arms

Pelagio Galvani (c. 1165 – 30 January 1230, Portuguese: Paio Galvão Latin: Pelagius) was a Leonese cardinal, and canon lawyer. He became a papal legate and leader of the Fifth Crusade.

Born at Guimarães, his early life is little known. It is repeatedly claimed that he entered the Order of Saint Benedict but this is not proven. Pope Innocent III created him cardinal-deacon of Santa Lucia in Septisolio around 1206. Later, he was promoted to the rank of cardinal-priest of S. Cecilia (probably on 2 April 1211), and finally opted for the suburbicarian see of Albano in the spring of 1213. He subscribed the papal bulls between 4 May 1207 and 26 January 1230. He was sent on a diplomatic mission to Constantinople in 1213. During this two-year mission, he attempted to close Orthodox churches and imprison the clergy, but this caused such domestic upset that Henry of Flanders, the Latin Emperor of Constantinople, reversed his actions which had caused the "tempest which held the city of Constantine in its grip", as noted a contemporary historian. Three years later, he was elected Latin Patriarch of Antioch but his election was not ratified by the Holy See. He was dispatched in 1218 by Pope Honorius III to lead the Fifth Crusade at Damietta in Egypt, and made a poor strategic decision in turning down favourable peace offers made by the sultan al-Kamil. During his absence, the see of Albano was administered by Thomas of Capua.

He became dean of the Sacred College of Cardinals at the election to the papacy of Cardinal Ugolino Conti, who became Pope Gregory IX, on 19 March 1227. He was one of the leaders of the papal army in 1229–1230, during the War of the Keys against the Emperor Frederick II. He died at Monte Cassino and was buried there.
