= George of Wied =

German nobleman and the count of Wied (1200–1217)

George was a German nobleman and the count of Wied from around 1200 until 1217, when he resigned to join the Fifth Crusade. He was the leader of the Rhineland contingent and fought at the siege of Alcácer do Sal (1217) and the battle of Fariskur (1219).

== Accession amidst civil war ==
George was the eldest son of Count Dietrich of Wied. He may have been named after Saint George, to whom the chapel in Altwied Castle was dedicated. Some later sources mistakenly name him Gerard. He inherited the county when his father entered the monastery of Heisterbach around the year 1200.

At the start of his tenure, George was a vassal of Archbishop Adolf of Cologne and Count Henry V of the Rhine. In the disputed election of 1198, Henry's brother was elected king as Otto IV in opposition to Philip of Swabia. There is no record of George or his father's participation in the strife which followed, but it is probable that, as advocates of Andernach, they could not escape involvement. In October 1198, harassed by Philip during manoeuvres in the Rhineland, Otto retreated refuge to Andernach. When he retreated further north, Philip's forces captured the city and burned the church of Saint Mary.

In 1201, in his first appearance in any surviving document, George stands as a pledge to Archbishop Adolf for Otto IV's disclaimer on behalf of the House of Welf of all lands formerly held by his father, Duke Henry the Lion. George's whereabouts between 1201 and 1208 are unrecorded. Modern historians, beginning with Johann Stephan Reck, sometimes attribute to him a pilgrimage to the Holy Land as a crusader in 1208.

== Count of Wied ==
In 1208, George signed as a witness to a renewed treaty of alliance between Adolf of Cologne and Duke Henry I of Brabant. In 1209, he witnessed the publication by Archbishop John I of Trier of the transfer of the tithe of Lonnig from Simon, lord of Ettringen, to the monastery of Lonnig.

In 1210, George was a witness when Otto IV placed the abbey of Rommersdorf under royal protection. Thereafter, he remained in the royal retinue until at least the middle of 1211. He accompanied Otto on his Romzug (trip to Rome) to obtain the crown of the Holy Roman Empire and probably only returned to Germany with the emperor in October 1211. Prior to leaving for Italy, he transferred the advocacy of Andernach to his brother Conrad. He reassumed the office in 1213.

By 1213, George's brother Metfried was archdeacon of Trier and another brother, Dietrich, had succeeded John as archbishop. All were present that year when Dietrich authorized Maria Laach Abbey to choose its own advocate. In June 1215, George was a witness when Dietrich confirmed that lands granted by Eberhard of Aremberg and his wife Adelheid to the monastery of Heisterbach were to be used to found Marienstatt Abbey.

Inspired by the crusade preaching of John of Xanten in 1215, George took the cross. As a previous supporter of Otto IV, he may have found the protection of crusader status useful in the aftermath of Otto's downfall. In 1217, he set out to join the Fifth Crusade. Although he was married, he had no children. He transferred the county of Wied and the advocacy of Andernach to his brother Lothar prior to setting out. A document of 1219 refers to Lothar as procurator for the unnamed countess of Wied, George's wife. The sources for the crusade still refer to George as the count of Wied, but also as the marshal of Cologne.

== Fifth Crusade ==
With Lord Gerlach II of Isenburg-Kobern, George led an army composed of crusaders from their own lands and the archbishoprics of Cologne and Trier down the Rhine in 1217 to embark for the Holy Land. An independent account of their expedition survives, Deeds of the Rhineland Crusaders. It makes clear that, although King Frederick II had taken the cross at the same time as George, George was aware that Frederick would not be joining the crusade in 1217. His later actions demonstrate that he nonetheless viewed his army as part of the crusade that Frederick would lead the following year.

The Gesta Treverorum records that George "played a leading role" in the expedition. The sources disagree about George's exact status. The Deeds states that Count William I of Holland was elected leader, but On the Journey of the Frisians claims that George took command of the vanguard and was elected leader overall while William was in command of the rearguard. The Journey implies that George's command was somewhat nominal. A joint leadership is mentioned by Roger of Wendover and Oliver of Paderborn, who call both men "captains". This arrangement would have been unusual but may have been necessitated by the linguistic situation in the fleet. Since the election of George is specified to have taken place in England, it is possible that William was the original leader and was only replaced by George after the stop in England.

According to the Deeds, the fleet of some 300 ships carrying crusaders from Germany and Frisia sailed out of Vlaardingen on 29 May 1217. They sailed first to England. While rounding Brittany, one of the German ships was wrecked on some rocks with loss of life. In the aftermath, according to the Journey, William was recognized as overall commander and George put in charge of the rearguard. In Galicia, the crusaders made a pilgrimage to Santiago. Leaving Galicia, the fleet was separated by a storm, with a part of it under George safely making port in Portugal. The rest of the fleet under William lost three ships before making port. The entire fleet was in Lisbon by 15 July.

In Lisbon, George favoured the suggestion of Bishop Soeiro that they attack the Almohad-held city of Alcácer do Sal. He and William argued that the winds were unfavourable for a passage into the Mediterranean and that in any case Frederick II would not be leading an expedition in the Holy Land until the following spring. Refusing to be delayed so long, the Frisians departed. The fleet that remained numbered about 180 ships. They besieged Alcácer until its fall on 21 October 1217. The Deeds describes George as "always in the lead" during the siege.

George and the fleet arrived in Acre on 26 April 1218. He joined the siege of Damietta in progress in Egypt, where the troops were divided by nationality. The Germans initially elected Count Adolf VI of Berg as their leader. Upon his demise in 1218, he was succeeded by George. George fought in the battle of Fariskur on 29 August 1219. He is mentioned by both Oliver of Paderborn and James of Vitry. There is no later record of him, nor of his return to Europe. He probably died in 1219. One late souce erroneously places his death on 15 June 1219. He probably died on crusade.

== Sources ==
- Bird, Jessalynn; Peters, Edward; Powell, James M., eds. (2013). Crusade and Christendom: Annotated Documents in Translation from Innocent III to the Fall of Acre, 1187–1291. University of Pennsylvania Press.
- Ferreiro Alemparte, Jaime (1999). Arribadas de Normandos y Cruzados a las Costas de la Península Ibérica (PDF). Sociedad Española de Estudios Medievales.
- Marvin, Laurence W. (2024). The Damietta Crusade, 1217–1221: A Military History. Oxford University Press.
- Pixton, Paul Brewer (1972). Dietrich of Wied, Archbishop of Trier, 1212–1242: A Study of Princely Politics and Religious Reform (PhD dissertation). University of Iowa.
- Powell, James M. (1986). Anatomy of a Crusade, 1213–1221. University of Pennsylvania.
- Riley-Smith, Jonathan (1977). What Were the Crusades?. Palgrave Macmillan.
- Smith, Thomas W. (2026). The Fifth Crusade:A History of the Epic Campaign to Conquer Egypt. Yale University Press.
- Van Cleve, Thomas C. (1969). "The Fifth Crusade". In Kenneth M. Setton; Robert Lee Wolff; Harry Hazard (eds.). A History of the Crusades. Vol. II: The Later Crusades, 1189–1311. University of Wisconsin Press. pp. 377–428.
- Villegas-Aristizábal, Lucas (2018). "A Frisian Perspective on Crusading in Iberia as Part of the Sea Journey to the Holy Land, 1217–1218". Studies in Medieval and Renaissance History. 3rd ser. 15: 67–149.
