= Siege of Alcácer do Sal =

Part of the Fifth Crusade and the Reconquista (1217)

- Part of the Fifth Crusade and the Reconquista
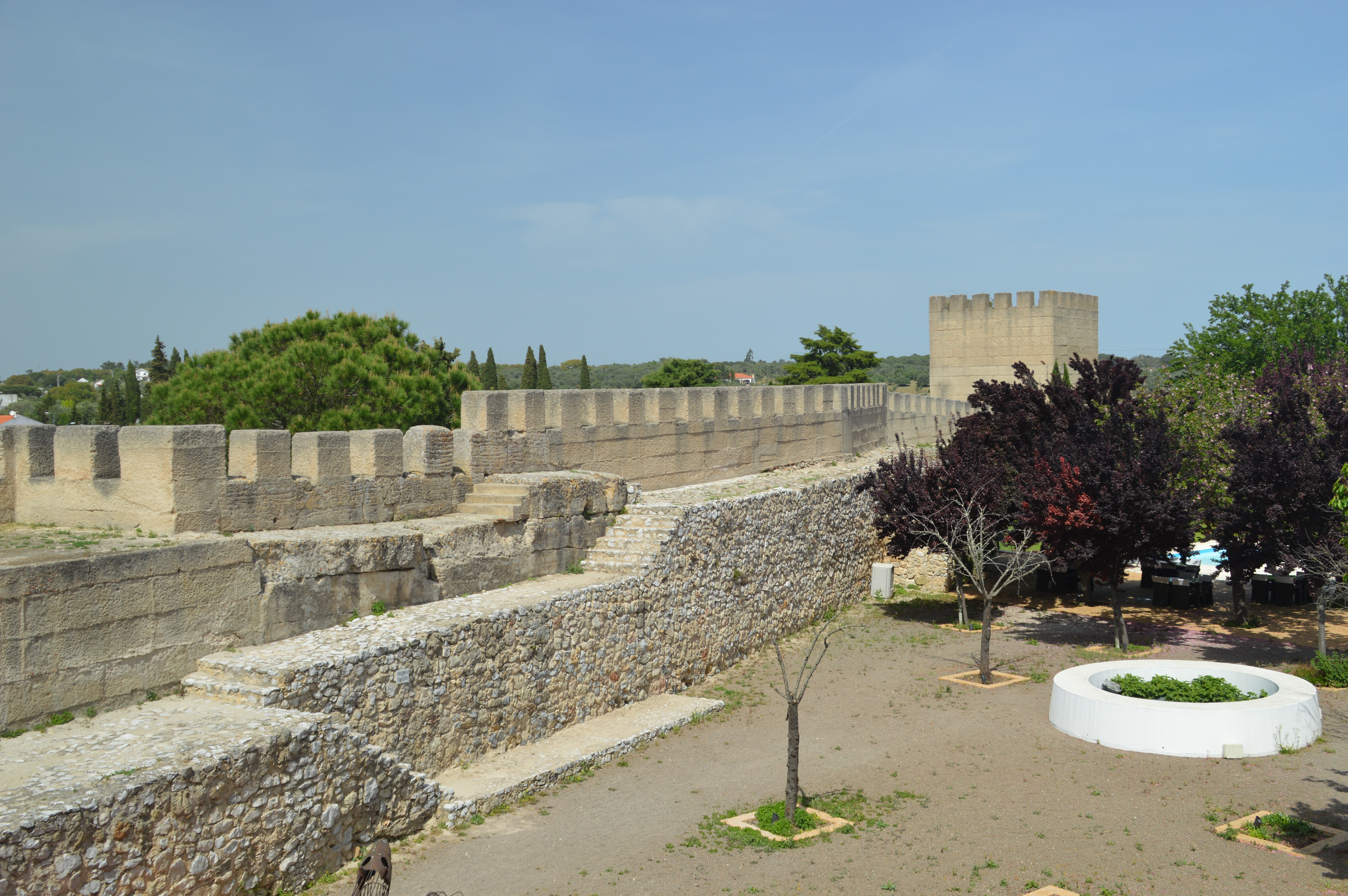
- Battlements of the castle of Alcácer do Sal
Date	30 July – 18 October 1217
Location	Qaṣr Abī Dānis, al-Gharb 38°22′21″N 8°30′49″W
Result	Portuguese–Crusader victory

Belligerents
Kingdom of Portugal; Crusaders from northern Europe	Almohad Caliphate

Commanders and leaders
Soeiro II of Lisbon; William I of Holland	ʿAbdallāh ibn Wazīr

The siege of Alcácer do Sal lasted from 30 July to 18 October 1217. The well fortified city of Alcácer do Sal was a frontier outpost of the Almohad Caliphate facing Portugal. It was besieged by forces from Portugal, León, the military orders and the Fifth Crusade. The latter were led by Count William I of Holland. The expedition was the brainchild of Bishop Soeiro II of Lisbon, whose diocese was threatened by regular raids from Alcácer. King Afonso II of Portugal did not take part in person, but the city was incorporated into his kingdom after its capitulation. The crusaders who took part in the siege, mainly from the Rhineland and the Low Countries, did so without papal authorization and were afterwards ordered to continue on to the Holy Land.

== Sources ==
There are two Latin eyewitness accounts of the siege. The anonymous Gesta crucigerorum Rhenanorum is written from the perspective of the German crusaders. The Carmen de expugnatione Salaciae was written by Goswin of Bossut, a priest from the Duchy of Brabant, for Bishop Soeiro.

The De itinere Frisonum is a contemporary record of the Frisian crusaders who sailed with the Germans to Portugal but did not partake in the siege of Alcácer. It was incorporated into the chronicle of Emo of Friesland. A contemporary account of the Fifth Crusade by Oliver of Paderborn includes some information on the Alcácer expedition.

There are three letters sent in the immediate aftermath of victory that are an important source for the siege. One was sent by Count William to Pope Honorius III; one was sent by the clergy to Honorius; and one is Honorius's reply. These letters are kept in the Vatican Apostolic Archive.

The siege is briefly recounted by Roger of Wendover. It is also widely mentioned in later Portuguese historiography, such as the Chronicle of 1344, the Chronicle of 1419 and the Chronicle of Dom Afonso II of Rui de Pina.

The major sources from the Muslim side are in Arabic. They include the Rawḍ al-Qirṭās and al-Ḥimyarī's Rawḍ al-Miʿṭār.

== Background ==
In the late 9th century, Alcácer do Sal (Qaṣr Abī Dānis in Arabic) was constructed at the mouth of the Sado by the Umayyads as a fortress against the Vikings. In 1108, it was attacked by the Norwegian Crusade, but remained in Muslim hands. After the conquest of Lisbon with the help of soldiers of the Second Crusade in 1147, Alcácer lay on the Almohad–Portuguese frontier. King Afonso I launched failed attacks on Alcácer in 1147, 1151 and 1157. In 1158, he besieged and captured the town. In 1191, the Almohads besieged and recaptured it.

According to Ibn al-Abbār, after its recapture the city was renamed Qaṣr al-Fatḥ ('castle of victory'). It may have been declared a ribāṭ, a frontier post with special privileges. This may be why the Portuguese clergy, in their letter to the pope, assigned the city religious importance. The governor of Alcácer in 1217 was ʿAbdallāh ibn Muḥammad ibn Sidray ibn ʿAbd al-Wahhāb Wazīr al-Qaysī, who had succeeded his father in 1212. He launched regular raids by land and sea against Portugal. According to the Carmen de expugnatione Salaciae, he was able to remit an annual tribute of 100 Christian captives to the Almohad caliph in Morocco.

The knights of Santiago at Palmela and other Portuguese garrisons established along the frontier had recurring clashes with the Almohads of Alcácer do Sal in particular.

The Christian victory at the Battle of Las Navas de Tolosa in 1212 was a deadly blow for the Almohads, and the Caliph had withdrawn to Morocco, where he became increasingly absent from politics. He was poisoned in 1214 and was succeeded by Yusuf II. Yet Yusuf II proved a poor leader, and discontent began emerging among his subjects, which afforded the Christian states of Iberia a valuable opportunity to capture more territory. Yet the death of Henry I of Castille in 1217 and the war which then broke out between Castile and León meant that only Portugal could take advantage of the growing dissent within the Almohad regime. It would not be due to the initiative of king Afonso II who was unwarlike, but of his subjects.

== Preparations ==
At the Fourth Lateran Council in 1215, Bishop Soeiro II of Lisbon asked Pope Innocent III for permission to employ crusaders in a planned Portuguese offensive against the Almohads, but the pope refused. Fighting in Portugal would be contrary to crusaders' vows. Despite this papal prohibition, there is evidence that northern crusaders expected that to participate in warfare in Portugal, as previous groups of crusaders had done at the siege of Lisbon during the Second Crusade (1147) and the siege of Silves during the Third Crusade (1189). Soeiro preached the cross in his diocese in preparation for the expected campaign.

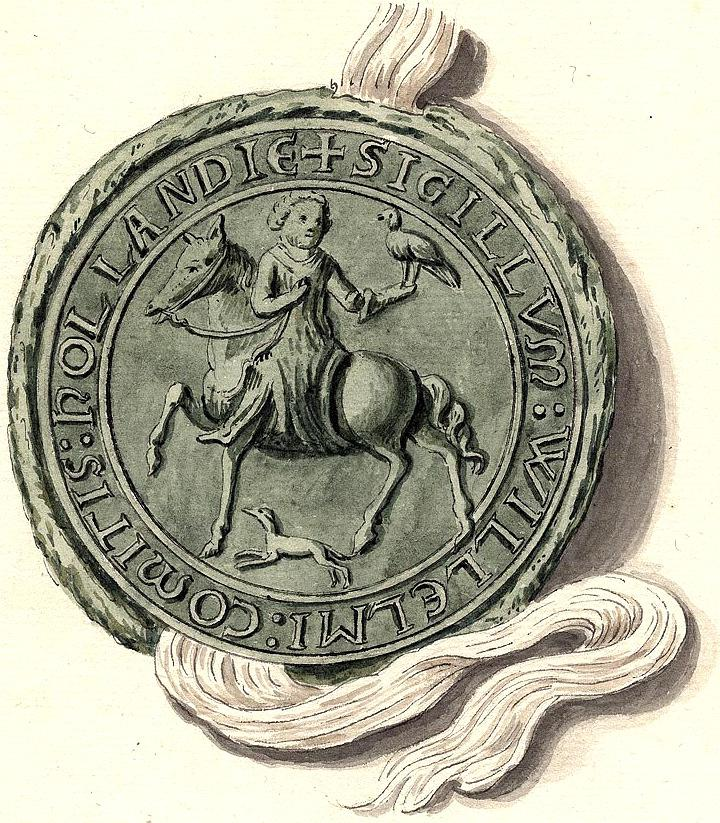
Seal of William of Holland

On 29 May 1217, a fleet of almost 300 ships sailed from Vlaardingen. It contained an army of crusaders recruited mainly from the Rhineland and Frisia. The leaders of the expedition were Count George of Wied and Count William I of Holland, although there is some confusion regarding their exact status. According to the De itinere, George was the original commander-in-chief and William in charge of the rearguard of the fleet. According to the Gesta, which mentions both counts, William was elected sole leader at Dartmouth when the crusaders "decided under him on laws and new rules concerning the observance of peace."

Following an incident off Brittany, there was a change in leadership. A ship from Monheim was lost on rocks and the rest of the fleet sheltered in Saint-Mathieu. William was placed in overall command with George as his lieutenant. This suggests that George was blamed for the loss. According to the Gesta, the fleet stopped in "the port of Faro" (the Carmen has "the lighthouse") and some of the pilgrims visited the shrine of Saint James at Compostela. Rui de Pina and the Chronicle of 1419 describe an attack on Almohad-controlled Faro in the far south preceding a retreat to Lisbon for repairs. This attack on Faro is elsewhere attributed to the Frisians who did not participate in the attack on Alcácer do Sal.

The fleet arrived in Lisbon on 10 July. It was met by Bishops Soeiro II of Lisbon and Soeiro II of Évora, as well as by the local leaders of the military orders: Pedro Alvites, master of the Knights Templar; Gonçalo, prior of the Knights Hospitaller; and Martim Pais Barregão, commendatory abbot of Palmela of the Order of Santiago.

The bishop of Lisbon tried to persuade the crusaders to help him attack Alcácer do Sal. The Frisians refused. With about a third of the fleet, they took on supplies and went on their way. The remaining two thirds of the fleet under the counts agreed to cooperate in the attack. Bishop Soeiro's call to a crusade reached far and wide across Portugal and even in neighbouring Castile. A Portuguese army of 20,000 was rapidly raised. The bulk of the army was made up of infantry from the urban militias, but it also included around 300 knights, as well as Templar squadrons, led by Master Dom Pedro Alvites, knights of Santiago led by Martim Pais Barregão and hospitallers led by Prior Dom Gonçalves de Cerveira.

King Afonso II may have played a role in preparations, but he did not participate in the attack on Alcácer. His aloofness is demonstrated by the letter of Count William to Pope Honorius, which refers to the kings of León and Navarre but does not mention Afonso.

The crusader fleet left Lisbon at the end of July and sailed up the Sado, while the rest of the army marched overland. The bishop of Lisbon was with the army, as was Pedro, abbot of Alcobaça.

== Siege ==
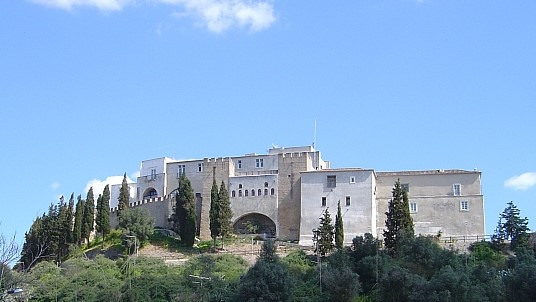
The high citadel of Alcácer do Sal.

The Almohads prepared for the coming siege by destroying all the trees in the immediate vicinity so that they could not be used as fuel for fire or as building material for siege engines. The siege began on 30 July. The first to clash with the Almohads were a number of almogávares (frontiersmen) who attempted to skirmish with the garrison but they were repulsed. The crusaders however, managed to approach the city and set up camp by its walls. The rest of the army linked up with the crusaders on August 3, and preparations for the assault on Alcácer began.

The Almohad defenses included two lines of fortifications, furnished with numerous towers, crowning a hilltop. The besiegers attacked with towers, catapults and mines. The crusaders dismantled eight of their ships to make siege engines. The Carmen describes poetically how the attackers attempted to fill in the moat with fig and olive trees, but the defenders set the infill on fire.

According to the Rawḍ al-Qirṭās, the Caliph Yūsuf II ordered the governors of Córdoba, Jaén, Seville and other places in the Gharb al-Andalus to raise a relief army. The clergy's letter to Honorius confirms the presence of the army of Badajoz as well. On 8 September, the relief armies arrived in the vicinity of Alcácer. The author of the Gesta estimated the size of the relief force at 100,000 men. In response, the besiegers dug a defensive ditch around their position. They were reinforced by the arrival of 32 more ships, but were still outnumbered and short of horses.

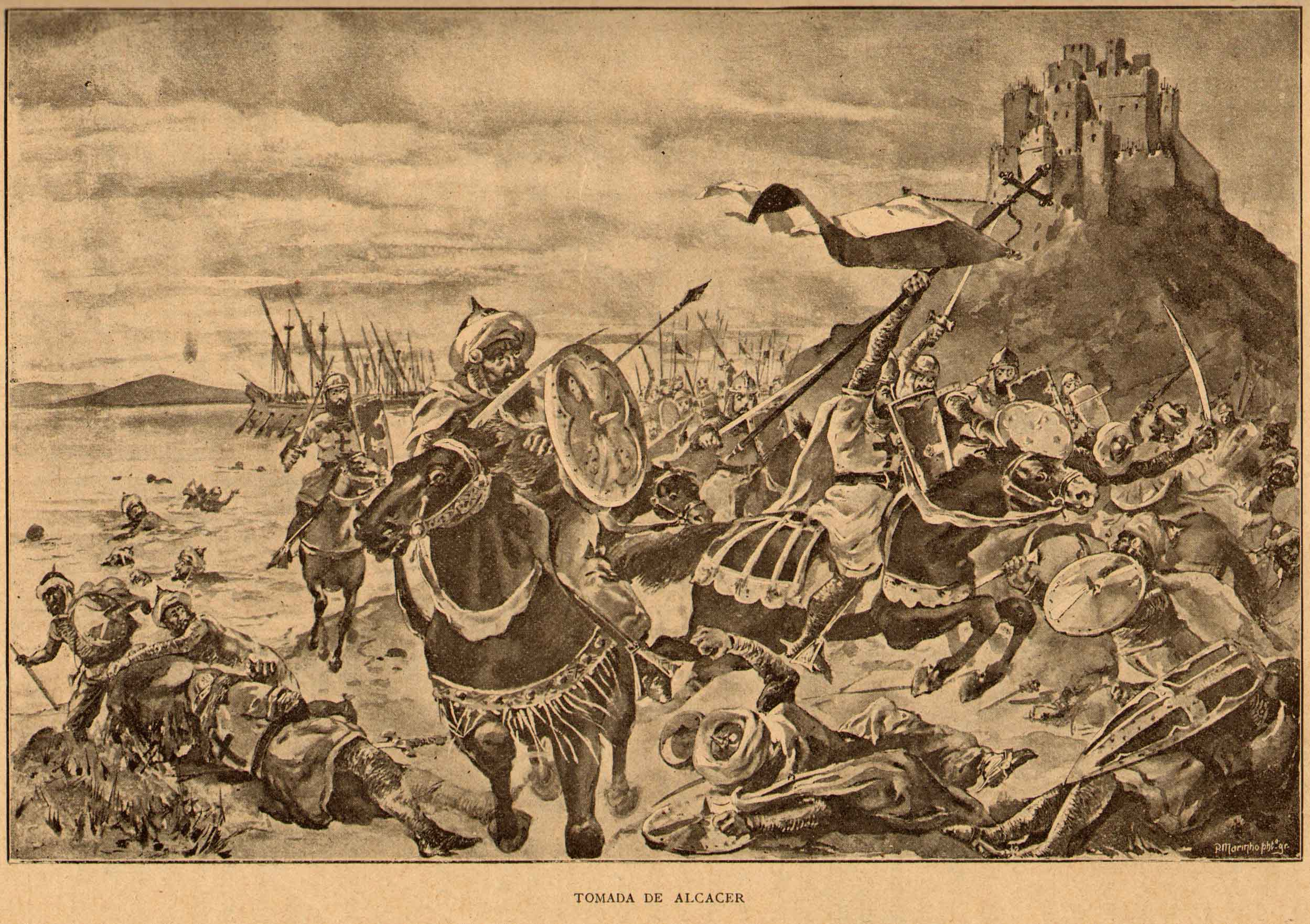
The taking of Alcácer do Sal, by Alfredo Roque Gameiro.

As the Muslim relief army arrived, Christian reinforcements, raised by several Portuguese and Leonese barons, were on the march. They included contingents of Hospitallers, Templars and the Order of Santiago. The Templars were led by Pedro Álvarez de Alvito, master of the order in Iberia; the knights of Santiago by Martim Pais Barregão, commander of Palmela; and the Hospitallers by the prior of Portugal Gonçalves de Cerveira. The timely arrival of this army was later claimed as a miracle by the clergy in their letter to the pope. In addition, Caesarius of Heisterbach reports that an eyewitness told him how "the galleys which [the Saracens] had brought over the sea against the Christians were put to flight by the terror of [a] celestial vision" of "a whiteclad host, wearing red crosses upon the breast."

On 11 September, the two armies met in battle outside Santa Catarina on the banks of the Sítimos. The Christians were victorious. The Rawḍ al-Miʿṭār reports that the Almohad army became terrified upon sighting a force of 70 knights. The Rawḍ al-Qirṭās blames this on the memory of the battle of Las Navas de Tolosa in 1212. Many turned and fled, while the Christians pursued them "until killing them all". This is an exaggeration, since the Rawḍ al-Miʿṭār mentions prisoners.

The defeat of the army in the field convinced the defenders in the fortress that victory was impossible. On 18 October, the city surrendered. Pope Honorius credited the victory to two siege towers. Most of the defenders were taken captive. The governor, ʿAbdallāh ibn Wazīr, accepted baptism. The city was handed over to the Order of Santiago.

== Aftermath ==
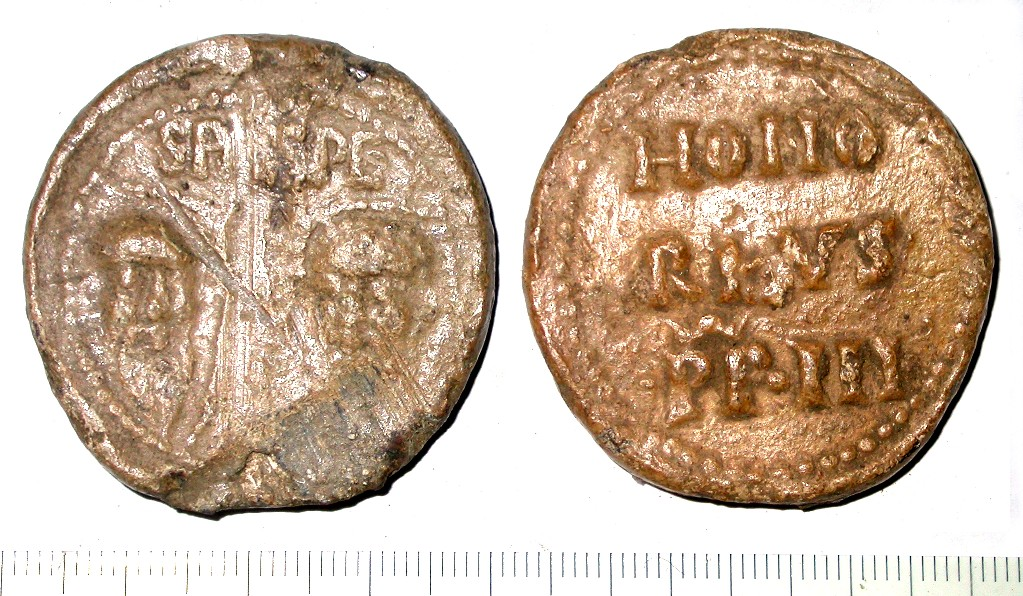
A seal of Honorius III

After the victory, the bishops of Lisbon and Évora and the leaders of the three military orders who were present wrote to Honorius III with three requests: that the pope order the crusaders to remain in Portugal for one year for mopping up operations; that the crusade indulgence be extended to those who took part and to those who would take part in Portuguese operations in the future; and that the Iberian proceeds of the tax of a twentieth (vicesima) levied on ecclesiastical incomes by Innocent III in the bull Ad liberandum (1215) for the Holy Land be set aside for operations in Iberia. These requests were based on the proviso in the bull Quia maior (1213) that "if perchance it were needed, we [the pope] would take care to give our attention to any serious situation that arises." The clergy also reported to Honorius three miracles that vindicated the operation: the timely arrival of the reinforcements and the appearance in the sky of a cross and a heavenly army. These three miracles are also mentioned in the Carmen and in the Chronica regia Coloniensis.

At the same time, William of Holland wrote to the pope to ask whether he should continue to lead his army to the Holy Land or remain to fight in Portugal. Honorius was unpersuaded by either appeal. He did not extend the indulgence to the Portuguese campaign and ordered the crusaders to continue onwards to the Holy Land. An exception was made for any impoverished crusaders and for those who had been on the eight ships used to make siege engines. These two groups were absolved from their vows. Honorius did acknowledge the triumph at Alcácer do Sal when, on 11 January 1218, he reissued the bull Manifestis probatum confirming the independence of Portugal and attributing the victory to Afonso II. On 12 January, he issued a bull granting the crusaders at Alcácer the same indulgence he had previously refused. On 26 January, Honorius, in his letter answering the expedition's clergy, exempted from their crusade vows all wounded, sick, poor and those whose had lost their ships when they were broken up to make siege engines.

With the fall of Alcácer do Sal, a number of minor towns in the region were then also captured. The knights of Santiago recaptured Santiago do Cacém further to the south, still in 1217. Certain other castles were taken likely in Afonso IIs reign, notably Borba, Vila Viçosa and Moura. Thus most of the upper Alentejo was annexed to Portugal. Yet the south-eastern border would remain elastic until the reign of Afonso IIs successor.

In January 1218, Afonso II formally placed Alcácer under the command of Martim Barregão, whose son-in-law, Gonçalo Mendes de Sousa, was Afonso's majordomo. The city was placed under the ecclesiastical jurisdiction of the diocese of Évora. It was never again captured by Muslims, but its importance declined in relation to Setúbal.

== Bibliography ==
- Afonso, Carlos (2018). "Gosuini de expugnatione Salaciae carmen: Analysing a Source Through a Strategy Theoretical Corpus" (PDF). Revista de Ciências Militares. 6 (1): 41–62.
- Bird, Jessalynn; Peters, Edward; Powell, James M., eds. (2013). Crusade and Christendom: Annotated Documents in Translation from Innocent III to the Fall of Acre, 1187–1291. University of Pennsylvania Press.
- Claverie, Pierre-Vincent (2013). Honorius III et l'Orient (1216–1227): Étude et publication de sources inédites des Archives vaticanes (ASV). Brill.
- Gomes Martins, Miguel (2011). De Ourique a Aljubarrota: A Guerra Na Idade Média. A Esfera dos Livros.
- Khawli, Abdallah (1997). "La famille des Banū Wazīr dans le Ġarb d'al-Andalus aux XII et XIII siècles" (PDF). Arqueologia Medieval (5): 103–116.
- Lay, Stephen (2009). The Reconquest Kings of Portugal: Political and Cultural Reorientation on the Medieval Frontier. Palgrave Macmillan.
- Livermore, Harold V. (1947). A History of Portugal. Cambridge University Press.
- McMurdo, Edward (1888). The History of Portugal: From the Commencement of the Monarchy to the Reign of Alfonso III. Vol. 1. S. Low, Marston, Searle, & Rivington.
- Picard, Christophe (2004). "Ḳaṣr Abī Dānis". In Bearman, P. J.; Bianquis, Th.; Bosworth, C. E.; van Donzel, E. & Heinrichs, W. P. (eds.). The Encyclopaedia of Islam, Second Edition. Volume XII: Supplement. Leiden: E. J. Brill. pp. 513–514. ISBN 978-90-04-13974-9.
- Powell, James M. (1986). Anatomy of a Crusade, 1213–1221. University of Pennsylvania.
- Roser Nebot, Nicolau (2018). "El declive del poder almohade en al-Andalus y la pérdida de Mallorca según la obra Taʾrīj Mayūrqa de Ibn ʿAmīra Al-Majzūmī de Alcira (582–658 H/1186–1260 M)". Anaquel de Estudios Árabes. 29: 241–261. doi:10.5209/ANQE.58720.
- Villegas-Aristizábal, Lucas (2019). "Was the Portuguese Led Military Campaign Against Alcácer do Sal in the Autumn of 1217 Part of the Fifth Crusade". Al-Masāq. 29 (1): 50–67. doi:10.1080/09503110.2018.1542573. S2CID 165784582.
- Wilson, Jonathan, ed. (2021). The Conquest of Santarém and Goswin's Song of the Conquest of Alcácer do Sal: Editions and Translations of De expugnatione Scalabis and Gosuini de expugnatione Salaciae carmen. Crusade Texts in Translation. Routledge.
