= Siege of Faro =

Siege of Faro may refer to:

- Siege of Faro (1148) – brief unsuccessful siege by northern crusaders
- Siege of Faro (1249) – Portuguese conquer the city from the Taifa of Niebla

== See also ==
- Frisian raids in al-Andalus, targeted Faro in 1217
