= Frisian raids in al-Andalus =

In July–August 1217, a group of Frisian crusaders sailing from Frisia towards Acre to take part in the Fifth Crusade attacked the three Almohad-controlled cities of Faro, Rota and Cádiz on the Atlantic coast of al-Andalus before entering the Mediterranean.

The fullest account of the Frisian expedition is De itinere Frisonum, an anonymous eyewitness narrative in Latin that was incorporated into the chronicle of Emo of Friesland. It portrays the raids as divinely- and ecclesiastically-approved and thus as a legitimate part of the crusade.

== Background ==
A group of northern crusaders had besieged Faro in 1148, seeking unsuccessfully to extort a ransom.

The Frisian fleet of 1217 was only a part of a much larger fleet that had sailed from Vlaardingen on 29 May. According to De itinere Frisonum, they stopped at Phare, a fortified port in Galicia, on 16 June, where, according to the Carmen de expugnatione Salaciae, they repaired their ships and, according to the Gesta crucigerorum Rhenanorum, paid a visit to the shrine of Saint James at Compostela. Lucas Villegas-Aristizábal and Jonathan Wilson translate Phare as "lighthouse", which Villegas-Aristizábal interprets as a reference to A Coruña. Laurence Marvin interprets it as the Ría de Muros e Noia, adding as a suggestion Cape Finisterre. Thomas Van Cleve identifies Phare as Punta de Estaca de Bares.

The fleet arrived in Lisbon on 10 July. While most of the crusaders agreed to participate in an assault on Alcácer do Sal being organized by Bishop Soeiro II of Lisbon, the Frisian contingent refused and sailed from Lisbon with about a third of the fleet. This was at least eighty ships. No leaders of the Frisian contingent are known by name. The Frisian who took the lead in opposing the attack on Alcácer, Abbot Heribert II of Werden, opted to remain with the main fleet nevertheless.

== Raids ==
A page from De itinere Frisonum with the placenames Hairin (Faro), Roden (Rota) and Cadir (Cádiz) boxed in red

=== Faro ===
Despite their reticence to attack Alcácer do Sal, the Frisians launched their own attack on Faro (Hairin) at the end of July, within days of leaving Lisbon. They landed from small boats and beat back the defenders, who managed to shut the gate. A Frisian archer, however, shot one of the defenders off of a rope ladder and then scaled the wall. He raised a standard on the highest tower and opened the gate. The Frisians evidently fought on foot. After sacking the city, the crusaders were again under way by 1 August.

According to De itinere Frisonum, the crusaders were visited after their victory by an apparition of the Virgin Mary, who thanked them for enacting "her vengeance". They had invoked her name before their attack:

Then without delay we advanced onto the shore in smaller vessels and discussed the matter of how to besiege the city. Then as there were diverse opinions, inflated by the Holy Spirit or by their impetus at night, the Frisians rose their standards toward heaven, and after they asked the Holy Virgin for her help with a song of invocation, they boldly attacked the enemy drawn up in the field and the city.

=== Rota ===
On 1 August, the Frisians sailed past Olhão, Armona, Cacela, Saltés and "the sands of Saint Eulalia" (probably a village now lost beneath the lagoon of Santa Olalla in Doñana National Park). On 2 August, the Frisians attacked Rota, easily capturing the citadel and even spending the night in the city. One group, weighed down with loot and only slowly returning to the ships, was harried by the locals. The archers and crossbowmen were able to keep them at a distance until the Frisians could break for the ships.

Although no prayers to or apparitions of the Virgin are associated with the raid on Faro, De itinere Frisonum stresses the humility of the crusaders after their victory: "the victors, therefore, praised one another, while belittling their own achievements." This demonstrates that in the eyes of the chronicler, the Frisians did not cease to be crusaders when they became raiders.

=== Cádiz ===
The following day (4 August), they found Cádiz abandoned by its inhabitants, who had learned of the fate of Faro and Rota. They had taken shelter in the citadel. The crusaders rested in Cádiz for several days, plundering the city, destroying its fruit trees and razing its mosque. The wooden beams of the mosque were taken to repair the ships: "the mosque built so luxuriously and artfully that no one would believe it as it was told, and so could do justice to its description, we razed to the ground; its colorful wooden beams and carved 4owers we used to suit our own needs."

When they left on 7 August, the crusaders put the city to the torch. In contrast to the first two raids, the third raid comes in for criticism in De itinere Frisonum. The crusaders' vanity—"the arrogance of spirit that is always born from prosperity"—is blamed for the citizens' escape. The decision to burn Cádiz may have been "a strategic action to disrupt the trading networks between the al-Andalus and North Africa."

== Aftermath ==
The three raids on Faro, Rota and Cádiz were the only raids the Frisians made on their voyage to Acre. According to De itinere Frisonum, when a part of the fleet landed in Corneto on 9 October, it was met by Pope Honorius III, who praised the Frisians' exploits in al-Andalus. Although such praise may have been mere lip service, Lucas Villegas-Aristizábal suggests that it reflected the fact that by their raids the Frisians had supported themselves economically and so were neither a burden nor a danger when travelling through Christian lands.

After overwintering in Corneto, the Frisian fleet set sail on 25 March. The fleet reached Lampedusa on 2 April, where it met a fleet of Genoese corsairs that had been raiding Africa. They reached Crete on 15 April and Acre on 26 April.

In later Portuguese historiography, there is possible conflation of the crusaders' earlier stop in the Galician locality of Phare and the Frisians' later attack on Faro. According to Rui de Pina and the Chronicle of 1419, the fleet was blown off course in a storm and landed at Faro in the country of the Moors. They took control of the city and port, but when "the weather turned against them ... in order to repair the damage to the ships, they unfurled their sails and set for Lisbon."

== Sources ==
- Afonso, Carlos (2018). "Gosuini de expugnatione Salaciae carmen: Analysing a Source Through a Strategy Theoretical Corpus" (PDF). Revista de Ciências Militares. 6 (1): 41–62.
- Alves Moreira, Filipe (2010). A Crónica de Portugal de 1419: Fontes, Estratégias e Posteridade (PDF) (PhD diss.). Faculdade de Letras do Porto.
- Bird, Jessalynn; Peters, Edward; Powell, James M., eds. (2013). Crusade and Christendom: Annotated Documents in Translation from Innocent III to the Fall of Acre, 1187–1291. University of Pennsylvania Press.
- Cavilla Sánchez-Molero, Francisco (2019). "Fondeaderos de época islámica en la bahía de Cádiz: fuentes documentales y arqueológicas". Riparia. Suplemento 2: 4–43.
- Ferreiro Alemparte, Jaime (1999). Arribadas de Normandos y Cruzados a las Costas de la Península Ibérica (PDF). Sociedad Española de Estudios Medievales.
- Marvin, Laurence W. (2024). The Damietta Crusade, 1217–1221: A Military History. Oxford University Press.
- Mol, Johannes A. (2002). "Frisian Fighters and the Crusades" (PDF). Crusades. 1: 89–110. doi:10.1080/28327861.2002.12220535. S2CID 161825224.
- Moolenbroek, Jaap J. van (2016). Nederlandse kruisvaarders naar Damiate aan de Nijl: Acht eeuwen geschiedenis en fantasie in woord en beeld. Hilversum.
- Van Cleve, Thomas C. (1969). "The Fifth Crusade". In Kenneth M. Setton; Robert Lee Wolff; Harry Hazard (eds.). A History of the Crusades. Vol. II: The Later Crusades, 1189–1311. University of Wisconsin Press. pp. 377–428.
- Villegas-Aristizábal, Lucas (2018). "A Frisian Perspective on Crusading in Iberia as Part of the Sea Journey to the Holy Land, 1217–1218". Studies in Medieval and Renaissance History. 3rd ser. 15: 67–149.
- Wilson, Jonathan, ed. (2021). The Conquest of Santarém and Goswin's Song of the Conquest of Alcácer do Sal: Editions and Translations of De expugnatione Scalabis and Gosuini de expugnatione Salaciae carmen. Crusade Texts in Translation. Routledge.
