= De expugnatione Scalabis =

1147 Latin-language account of the conquest of Santarém

Decorated initial of Cantemus at the start of the Scalabis. The rubric (in red) is the original title of the work, Quomodo sit capta Sanctaren civitas a rege Alfonso comitis Henrici filio.

De expugnatione Scalabis is an anonymous Latin account of the Portuguese conquest of Santarém on 15 March 1147. It is the earliest and most detailed source for that event and is informed by eyewitness accounts.

The title De expugnatione Scalabis ('On the Conquest of Santarém') was given to the text by Alexandre Herculano in his 1856 edition for the Portugaliae Monumenta Historica. It has been the common title ever since, although in the manuscript it is entitled Quomodo sit capta Sanctaren civitas a rege Alfonso comitis Henrici filio ('How the City of Santarém Was Captured by Alfonso, Son of Count Henry'). The text is preserved in one manuscript, now Lisbon, Biblioteca Nacional de Portugal, Fundo Alcobacense 415, which was copied at the Cistercian monastery of Alcobaça in the late twelfth or mid-thirteenth century. It takes up only two pages.

The Scalabis begins with a short hymn. Its incipit is an invitation to Christian worship—Cantemus domino fratres karissimi ('Let us sing to the Lord most dear brothers')—that parallels the invitatory Psalm 95. In the manuscript, the hymn takes up 31 lines out of 284, while the rest are devoted to the expedition.

The account of the expedition is narrated in the first person by King Afonso Henriques. This highly unusual form led Aires Nascimento to suggest that it was written to be performed as a type of drama. The king is almost certainly not the author of the account, who may have chosen to put it in the king's mouth to enhance its authority or interest. He was either a participant and eyewitness himself or relied on those who were. He wrote in the immediate aftermath of the conquest, since he does not mention Afonso's second great victory that year, the conquest of Lisbon on 21 October. He may have been writing in the cathedral of Coimbra.

The surviving text of the Scalabis, however, shows signs of a later stage of redaction. The crusading rhetoric placed in the mouth of Afonso is too harsh for Portugal in the 1140s. Jonathan Wilson suggests that the surviving version is a Cistercian product from the time of the Fifth Crusade (1217–1221). Bernardo de Brito included a Portuguese translation of the Scalabis in his Crónica de Cister in 1602. The first edition of the Latin text was published in 1632. An English translation appeared in 2021.

Wilson argues that Goswin of Bossut may be the author of the Scalabis, having been commissioned by Bishop Soeiro Viegas around 1217–1225 to rework a preexisting liturgical office celebrating the conquest of Santarém. Soeiro is known to have commissioned from Goswin the De expugnatione Salaciae carmen, a song celebrating the siege of Alcácer do Sal in 1217. It comes immediately after the Scalabis in Fundo Alcobacense 415.

== Bibliography ==
- Castro Henriques, António (2010). "De expugnatione Scalabis [On the Conquest of Santarém]". In Graeme Dunphy (ed.). Encyclopedia of the Medieval Chronicle. Vol. 1. Brill. p. 512.
- Furtado, Rodrigo (2021). "Writing History in Portugal Before 1200". Journal of Medieval History. 47 (2): 145–173. doi:10.1080/03044181.2021.1902375. hdl:10451/49522.
- Wilson, Jonathan (2019). "A Cistercian Point of View in the Portuguese Reconquista". Journal of Medieval Monastic Studies. 8: 95–142. doi:10.1484/J.JMMS.5.117961.
- Wilson, Jonathan, ed. (2021). The Conquest of Santarém and Goswin's Song of the Conquest of Alcácer do Sal: Editions and Translations of De expugnatione Scalabis and Gosuini de expugnatione Salaciae carmen. Crusade Texts in Translation. Routledge.
