= Menko (chronicler) =

13th-century priest and crusades chronicler

In the right column, the change in handwriting indicates the end of Emo's and the start of Menko's chronicle

Menko or Menco (1213/4 – 1276) was a priest and chronicler. He entered the Premonstratensian abbey of Bloemhof in Wittewierum in 1230 and was ordained as a priest in 1238. Over the next five years he served as vestiarius, cellarer and schoolmaster before being elected Bloemhof's third abbot in 1243. During his abbacy, he wrote a continuation of the Latin house chronicle, Cronica Floridi Horti, begun by the first abbot, Emo. He has an important account of the Frisian crusaders on the Eighth Crusade in 1269–1270. His continuation runs to 1273. He died in 1276. His autograph manuscript survives, as does a later copy of his chronicle with an anonymous continuation down to 1296.

== Bibliography ==
- Mol, Johannes (2010). "Menko". In Graeme Dunphy (ed.). Encyclopedia of the Medieval Chronicle. Vol. 2. Brill. p. 1103.
- Nip, Renée (2013). "Cronica Floridi Horti (Menconis)". The Narrative Sources from the Medieval Low Countries.
