= Siege of Aachen =

Siege of Aachen may refer to:

- Siege of Aachen (1248), part of the crusade against Frederick II
- Siege of Aachen (1614), part of the War of the Jülich Succession
