= Goswin of Bossut =

The last page of the Carmen de expugnatione Salaciae, with Goswin's name in Latin (Gosuinus) spelled out by the first letters of the stanzas

Goswin of Bossut (fl. 1231–1238) was a Cistercian monk, crusader, composer and writer of Villers Abbey in the Duchy of Brabant.

== Life ==
Goswin is the author of three to five known works. He is, nevertheless, a shadowy figure. He was probably born around 1195 or 1200. Oral tradition from Villers, preserved in the Acta Sanctorum, claims that he was from the village of Bossut. This was a French-speaking village and there are traces of Gallicisms in Goswin's writing, indicating that Goswin's first language was French. A family called De Bossut is known from the 12th century. Originally ministeriales of the dukes of Brabant, by the 13th century they had risen to the ranks of the nobility. It is likely that Goswin belonged to this family. A certain Gossuinus, probably the monk, is mentioned as a member of the family in a charter issued by Bishop John of Liège to Aulne Abbey in 1236.

Goswin displays some familiarity with Paris and he may have been educated there. Internal evidence in his writings suggests that he was a priest in addition to a cantor. It was probably as a priest that he joined a fleet of the Fifth Crusade in 1217. He was present at the siege of Alcácer do Sal in Portugal, but did not go on to the Holy Land. He may have served for a time as cantor in Lisbon Cathedral. He could be the eyewitness to the siege cited by Caesarius of Heisterbach in his Dialogus miraculorum.

Goswin was commissioned to write his Vita Idae by Abbot William, who governed from 1221 to 1237. In the 1230s, he had a hand in compiling the Flores Paradisi. Shortly after Goswin's death, a monk added a note to a manuscript of his Vita Arnulfi stating that he was "a monk and cantor" of Villers. Goswin was no longer cantor by 1260, when a monk named Thomas of Louvain held the position. He may have been pushed out during a purge of the more mystical monks after the mystically-inclined Abbot William was transferred to the abbey of Clairvaux in 1237.

== Writings ==
Goswin wrote in Latin. He wrote anonymously. The posthumous ascription to him of the Vita Arnulfi is all that allows his other works to be identified on the basis of "sameness of style and expression". Although such similarities had been detected as far back as the early 19th century, they were strengthened in the late 20th century by computer analysis. Four of his five works have been translated into English. His known works are:

- Life of Ida the Compassionate of Nivelles, Nun of La Ramée (Latin Vita Idae Nivellensis)
  This biography of Ida of Nivelles was written at the command of Abbot William, probably in 1232. It is divided into 34 chapters. The first four are chronological account of how Ida became a nun. The last three chronicle her illness, death and posthumous miracles. The middle chapters are non-chronological and use anecdotes to display Ida's virtues. The biography is followed by a poem, probably also by Goswin. The Vita Idae in two manuscripts, MSS 8609–8620 and 8895–8896 in the Royal Library of Belgium. In the former, it bears the title Vita venerabilis Idae sanctimonialis de Rameya.

Start of the Life of Arnulf in the Bodleian manuscript

- Life of Arnulf, Lay Brother of Villers (Latin Vita Arnulfi conversi Villariensis)
  This biography of the lay brother Arnulf Cornibout is divided into two books. It places great emphasis on Arnulf asceticism. It is unclear if this was a commissioned work. It was written towards 1237. A long and a short recension are known. Two contrary theories have been proposed to explain this. According to one, the longer is Goswin's original that was abridged by a later copyist. According to the other, Goswin later revised and expanded his original. Five manuscripts of the Life are known: one from Villers Abbey, one from Orval Abbey, one from the Berlin State Library, one from the Bodleian Library at Oxford and one that belonged to Aubert Le Mire.
- Life of Abundus, Monk of Villers (Latin Vita Abundi)
  Abundus was a personal friend of Goswin and his biography was written after 1234 and probably before 1239, while Abundus was still living. It was composed on Goswin's initiative with Abbot William's approval. It is incomplete and ends abruptly. There is a biography of Abundus published in French in 1603 that includes his death, but it is probably not the work of Goswin. Goswin's work survives in two manuscripts: MS Royal Library of Belgium 19525, copied at Villers during Goswin's lifetime, and MS Austrian National Library cvp 12854, a 15th-century copy of the first.
- Life of Franco (Latin Vita Franconis)
  This biography of Franco of Arquennes is a ballad of 82 quatrains intended to be sung. It is preserved in the 14th-century Gesta sanctorum Villariensium.
- Song of the Conquest of Alcácer do Sal (Latin De expugnatione Salaciae carmen)
  This poem, composed in 1217/1218, describes the siege of Alcácer. It contains instructions for identifying its dedicatee and its author by means of acrostics. These reveal that author as Gosuinus and the dedicatee as Suerius. These have been identified as Goswin of Bossut and Bishop Soeiro Viegas, who probably commissioned the work.

Goswin's style in the Song of the Conquest is much more complex than in the Lives. This can be partially explained by the preferences of Abbot William. In the Life of Ida, Goswin writes of "an order from my abbot, obliging me to set out the Life in a fairly simple style." One characteristic shared by all five of Goswin's extant works is his avoidance of personal names. He explains himself in the Life of Ida:

If any should ask why, both here and elsewhere, the names of persons included in our narrative are kept under seal of silence, let them know this has been done deliberately. For if the names were widely published in the ears of many, the persons, if still alive, might either be put to shame by the vituperation of their evil, or else unsuitably uplifted by the praises of their good..

Goswin may also have authored a lost biography of Abbot William, the Vita Wilhelmi Brusseli abbatis. He may also be responsible for an anonymous poem On the Conquest of Santarém (Latin De expugnatione Scalabis), which appears immediately preceding the Song of the Conquest in the manuscript. Georg Waitz suggested that the Gesta crucigerorum Rhenanorum, which covers the crusade down to 1219, was written by Goswin.

== Music ==
Three musical compositions are usually attributed to Goswin: a historia for Marie of Oignies and a historia and pium dictamen for Arnulf Cornibout. The two historiae are found in an autograph manuscript kept in Brussels, Royal Library of Belgium, MS II 1658. The pium dictamen is in Vienna, Austrian National Library, MS s.n. 12831 (olim Familien-Fidei-Kommiss-Bibliothek, MS 7909). The historia for Marie was probably based on the Vita Mariae of James of Vitry. Its attribution to Goswin is not absolutely certain.

== Bibliography ==
- Bakker, Anna de (2017). "A Life in Hours: Goswin of Bossut's Office for Arnulf of Villers". In Katie Ann-Marie Bugyis; Margot E. Fassler; A.B. Kraebel (eds.). Medieval Cantors and their Craft: Music, Liturgy and the Shaping of History, 800–1500. Boydell & Brewer. pp. 326–339.
- Cawley, Martinus, ed. (2003). Send Me God: The Lives of Ida the Compassionate of Nivelles, Nun of La Ramée, Arnulf, Lay Brother of Villers, and Abundus, Monk of Villers, by Goswin of Bossut. Brepols.
- Feiss, Hugh (2006). "The Liturgical Office of Mary of Oignies by Goswin of Bossut". In Anneke B. Mulder-Bakker (ed.). Mary of Oignies: Mother of Salvation. Brepols. pp. 175–196. doi:10.1484/M.MWTC-EB.3.3659.
- "Gesta Crucigerorum Rhenanorum". Geschichtsquellen des deutschen Mittelalters. Bayerische Akademie der Wissenschaften. 2022.
- Mannaerts, Pieter (2010). "An Exception to the Rule? The Thirteenth-Century Cistercian Historia for Mary of Oignies". Journal of the Alamire Foundation. 2 (2): 233–269.
- Newman, Barbara (2003). "Preface: Goswin of Villers and the Visionary Network". In Cawley, Martinus (ed.). Send Me God: The Lives of Ida the Compassionate of Nivelles, Nun of La Ramée, Arnulf, Lay Brother of Villers, and Abundus, Monk of Villers, by Goswin of Bossut. Brepols. pp. xxix–xlix.
- Wilson, Jonathan, ed. (2021). The Conquest of Santarém and Goswin's Song of the Conquest of Alcácer do Sal: Editions and Translations of De expugnatione Scalabis and Gosuini de expugnatione Salaciae carmen. Crusade Texts in Translation. Routledge.
