= Siege of Faro (1148) =

The siege of Faro of February 1148 was a minor expedition that took place on the sidelines of the Second Crusade. Following the capture of Lisbon in October 1147 by the Portuguese with the assistance of some crusaders sailing from England and Flanders, the crusaders overwintered in Lisbon. In February, a part of the Anglo-Flemish fleet attacked the port of Faro in Almoravid territory. The only account of the siege is found in the Annales Elmarenses:

The text in manuscript

Et cum iter proficere vellent, in III non. Februarii de Ulisbona velificantes Hairon invaserunt, et dum diuteram obsidionem pro ciborum defectu ibi facere non auderent, ab ipsis obsessis pro concessa pecunia obsides susceperunt; et magna insapientia ibidem circa quadraginta viros optimos perdiderunt, et cum illi pecuniam dare recusabant, obsides suos ante urbem suspendi videbant.

And since they desired to accomplish their journey [to the Holy Land], they sailed from Lisbon on the third of February and attacked Hairon; and since they did not dare to make a long siege there on account of lack of food, they received from the besieged people hostages for an agreed sum of money; and very unwisely they [the besieged] handed over about forty of their best men there; and when they refused to pay the money, they saw their hostages hanged before the city.

Although Philip Grierson, the first editor of the Annales, thought that Hairon may have been a reference to Oran on the north African coast, it corresponds to the Arabic name Harun for Faro. The identity of the besiegers is not entirely certain, since there is evidence that the English (and Norman) contingent remained in Lisbon at least until April, meaning that the crusaders who sailed in early February were the Flemish (plus a German contingent). The purpose of the attack on Faro was almost certainly "easy plunder to finance the remainder of the journey". The Annales is explicit that the hostages were executed for a failure of the besieged to live up to the terms of their surrender, a clarity rarely found in medieval sources on the execution of hostages. Christopher Tyerman describes the siege as a "messy failure", since its purpose was to extort money and none was acquired. The failure of such hostage agreements to secure payment, however, was the norm.

The Annales records that those who attacked Faro or at least a part of them went on to Jerusalem and took part in the siege of Damascus in July. Another part of the fleet, however, went on to join the siege of Tortosa and only arrived in the Holy Land after the siege of Damascus. Those who participated in the siege of Tortosa probably separated from the main fleet only after it entered the Mediterraneana and thus after the siege of Faro. The Annales records how the crusaders "bravely fought many battles on land and on sea" between Faro and Jerusalem.

Faro was raided in 1217 as part of the Fifth Crusade. It was conquered in 1249 by the Portuguese.

== Sources ==
- Constable, Giles (1953). "A Note on the Route of the Anglo-Flemish Crusaders of 1147". Speculum. 28 (3): 525–526.
- Grierson, Philip, ed. (1937). Les annales de Saint-Pierre de Gand et de Saint-Amand: Annales blandinienses, Annales elmarenses, Annales formoselenses, Annales elnonenses. Commission Royale d'Histoire.
- Jaspert, Nikolas (2001). "Capta est Dertosa clavis Christianorum: Tortosa and the Crusades". In Jonathan Phillips; Martin Hoch (eds.). The Second Crusade: Scope and Consequences. Manchester University Press. pp. 90–100.
- Livermore, Harold (1990). "The 'Conquest of Lisbon' and its Author". Portuguese Studies. 6: 1–16.
- Kosto, Adam J. (2012). Hostages in the Middle Ages. Oxford University Press.
- Tyerman, Christopher (2007). God's War: A New History of the Crusades. Penguin.
- Villegas-Aristizábal, Lucas (2018). "A Frisian Perspective on Crusading in Iberia as Part of the Sea Journey to the Holy Land, 1217–1218". Studies in Medieval and Renaissance History. 3rd ser. 15: 67–149.
