= João Branco Núncio =

Portuguese bullfighter

João Alves Branco Núncio (February 15, 1901 - January 26, 1976) was a Portuguese bullfighter. He was born in Alcácer do Sal, in a whitewashed house next to that of his uncle, the Viscount of Alcácer do Sal. Today it belongs to the Viscount's Philharmonic Friendship Society.

He was the son and grandson of farm-hands. His grandfather, Joaquim Mendes Núncio came from Golegã to Alcácer do Sal in 1878. He appeared in his first public event at the age of 13, in Évora's bullfighting ring. Later, he graduated in Commerce from the local "Academic School" and dedicated himself to toiling in the rural properties of Alcácer do Sal.

Overall, he took part in approximately one thousand bullfights. He was also known as the “Califa de Alcácer” because, besides being an expert rider, he was also a farm-hand and a horse master. After distinguishing himself in local contests, an opportunity was granted him to appear in the bullfighting ring of Campo Pequeno, in Lisbon, on May 27, 1923. He vied with António Luís Lopes, in a race organized by Patrício Cecílio, bullfighting with his famous horse Quo Vadis.

He was a bullfighter up to the hour of his death, on January 26, 1976 in Golegã. He was considered by many people the greatest horserider and bullfighter of all. He was called the "Master", in honor of his skills.
