= Carmen de expugnatione Salaciae =

Latin epic poem by Goswin of Bossut

Decorated initial S at the start of the Carmen. The rubric (in red) is the original title of the work, Quomodo capta fuit Alcaser a Francis.

The Carmen de expugnatione Salaciae ('Song of the Conquest of Alcácer do Sal') is a Latin epic poem in 115 elegiac couplets describing the siege of Alcácer do Sal in 1217. It was written by Goswin of Bossut for Soeiro Viegas, bishop of Lisbon.

The Carmen is "the most detailed and full account to have survived for the definitive taking of Alcácer" from the Almohads by the Portuguese with help from the soldiers of the Fifth Crusade. In modern studies, it is usually grouped with two earlier accounts of northern crusaders' activities in Portugal, De expugnatione Lyxbonensi of 1147 and the De itinere navali of 1189.

== Synopsis ==
The Carmen is "complex and frequently obscure". As in Goswin's other works, it eschews proper names. In fact, no individual is named in the Carmen.

The Carmen contains fifteen stanzas of varying length. The first stanza is prefatory. The second stanza begins, "Pilgrims were anxious to fulfil certain vows" and gives the year as "one thousand two hundred years in Christ ... also ... ten with seven." It describes the sea voyage as far as Porto. When they arrive in Lisbon, the bishop gives a speech that begins:

Oh brethren, servants of Christ, enemies of the enemies of the cross, scorners of the world and splendour of martyrdom. As stands evident, God brought you to shore on our coasts, in order that by means of your arms our yoke may be destroyed. There is close by us a fortress [which is] above all fortresses injurious to the Christians, that has the name Alcaser.

The name Alcaser is analyzed as "Fortress of the Gods". The bishop's speech divides the crusaders: "a disagreement in the fleet occurs, disapproving one part this speech, the other approving, a schism ensues" and those who disagree go on to Marseille. This refers to the departure of the Frisians.

Alcácer is described as defended by a palisade, a ditch and "a two-fold wall" with many towers. The attackers fell trees to fill in the ditch, but the defenders set fire to them. They pelt the walls with siege engines to little effect. A relief army of "five times three thousand cavalrymen and ten times four thousand foot soldiers" is reported to be on the march: "Muslim Spain unites against us, it sends against us Three Kings." Reinforcements arrive on "four times eight ships" and the attackers contravallate with "a rampart [and] a ditch."

At this juncture, one of the crusaders argues against continuing the enterprise. They are down to 300 horse, but during that night 500 horsemen arrive to reinforce them. The ensuing battle is a victory for the attackers, who see a cross in the sky and a heavenly army fighting alongside them. The Muslims are described as confused: "the result is that comrade strikes comrade." The victory took place on the feast day of Iacintus and Prothus.

After the victory in battle, an enemy fleet of galleys approaches, but is lost in a storm. The attackers unsuccessfully attack the walls. They mine the walls and the defenders countermine, leading to fights underground. Two siege towers are then built and the enemy asks for terms. After the surrender, "the leader of the fortress is immersed in baptismal water." The Order of Santiago is given the conquered land. Indeed, the bishop of Lisbon alone "remained ... unrewarded and won nothing thereupon."

The work ends with an address to the bishop.

== Author and dedication ==
The Carmen contains instructions on how to identify its dedicatee and author by means of acrostics. The first letter of each stanza spells the names. The names given by this method in the Latin text are Suerius and Gosuinus. The author was first identified as the Cistercian monk Goswin of Bossut by Fortunato de São Boaventura in the 19th century. Boaventura also identified "French idiomatic elements" in the Carmen. His hypothesis has been strengthened since. It would appear that Goswin was a priest who accompanied the fleet and remained behind in Portugal in the service of Bishop Soeiro.

Goswin may have originally written an account of the crusade for his abbot, Walter of Utrecht. This was probably in the immediate aftermath of the conquest. This was then repurposed at the request of Soeiro, perhaps as part of Soeiro's efforts to have Pope Honorius III officially sanction the endeavour as a crusade.

== Transmission ==
The Carmen is preserved in one manuscript, now Lisbon, Biblioteca Nacional de Portugal, Fundo Alcobacense 415, which was copied at the Cistercian monastery of Alcobaça in the mid-thirteenth century. It was probably copied from a manuscript originally of Lisbon Cathedral. It immediately follows the De expugnatione Scalabis, an account of the conquest of Santarém in 1147.

The title Gosuini de expugnatione Salaciae carmen was given to the text by Alexandre Herculano in his 1856 edition for the Portugaliae Monumenta Historica. It has been the common title ever since, although in the manuscript it is entitled Quomodo capta fuit Alcaser a Francis ('How Alcácer was Captured by the Franks'). Auguste Molinier rearranged Herculano's title and omitted Goswin's name: Carmen de expugnatione Salaciae. A Latin edition with English translation of the Carmen was published in 2021. The translation uses the title Goswin's Song of the Conquest of Alcácer do Sal.
