= Ida of Nivelles =

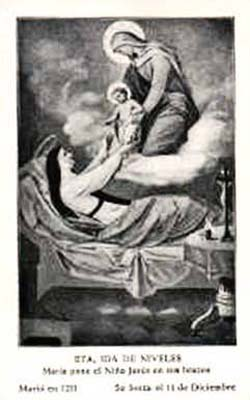

Personal life
- Born: Nivelles
- Died: 11 December 1231

Religious life
- Religion: Christianity
- Order: Cistercian

Ida of Nivelles (c.1190 – 11 December 1231) was a beatified Cistercian nun and mystic.

== Biography ==
Ida was born into a prosperous mercantile family in Nivelles, an important market town and pilgrimage destination in Brabant, a short distance to the south of Brussels. After her father died the family arranged for her to be married. She was aged only nine or sixteen (sources differ), and not wishing to marry she fled to a beguinage, a community of intentionally unmarried Godly women who lived in a shared community, but without taking vows or cutting themselves off from the world outside. The beguinage community that took her in comprised seven women who lived near the Church of the Holy Sepulchre in her home town. Ida became a beguine.

She moved on in around 1213, accepted into the Cistercian convent at Kerkom near Tienen. (The convent relocated shortly afterwards to La Ramée.) There she worked as a writer and illustrator. She reported numerous visions and other experiences by which she had been affected, and developing a particularly close relationship with the Virgin Mary. Her experiences were sufficiently widely attested for her to become identified as a woman mystic. She is also celebrated for her exceptional dedication to poverty relief.

Goswin of Bossut wrote a biography of Ida of Nivelles shortly after her death. She was later beatified. The church celebrates her each year on 12 December.
