= De itinere Frisonum =

Eyewitness account of Frisian crusaders

The red letter h represents the start of De itinere in the manuscript.

De itinere Frisonum ('Of the Frisian itinerary'), also known under the title Topographia et eventus, is an eyewitness account written in Latin of the Frisian crusaders' journey from Friesland to Acre during the Fifth Crusade (1217–1218). The narrative was composed by an anonymous participant of the venture who most likely was a member of the clergy. Abbot Emo of Friesland of the Premonstratensian monastery of Bloemhof copied it without alterations into his chronicle (Kroniek van Wittewierum). Emo's version is the only surviving copy of the lost original and it is kept in the Library of the University of Groningen in the Netherlands. The narrative is noteworthy for its detailed description of the geography of the lands encountered by the Frisian Crusaders on their journey and the author's perspective on the motivations of his compatriots during the venture. The narrative runs parallel up to the Frisian fleet's arrival to Lisbon with the Rhenish text known as Gesta crucigerorum Rhenanorum.

The narrative is usually used by historians for its reference to the devotional aspects of the Frisians during their visit to Lisbon. Here they make allusion to a Frisian local martyr which the narrative calls Pupeto Ulinga who according to the narrative had died during the siege of Lisbon of 1147. Also the text contains a section where the Frisian narrator explains why the Frisians refused to help the Portuguese in their planned attacked on the Almohad-controlled city of Alcácer do Sal. The narrator claims that Pope Innocent III had informed the Bishop Soeiro Viegas of Lisbon at the Fourth Lateran Council "that the liberation of the Church should begin at its head". The text makes no allusions to the siege of Damietta (1218–1219), finishing the story with Frisian fleet's arrival at Acre in the spring of 1218. The author seems content to narrate the crusading deeds of the Frisians in the Iberian Peninsula. The clerical narrator explains how his compatriots captured and destroyed by themselves without the aid of any other Christian group, the Almohad-controlled ports of Faro, Rota, and Cádiz. The author furthermore was eager to explain how these deeds were fully considered part of the crusade. This was especially so when he informed Pope Honorius III of them during the Frisian fleets winter layover in central Italy (October 1217 to March 1218).

== Editions and translations ==
- Latin only: Röhricht, Reinhold, Quinti belli sacri scriptores minores (Geneva, 1879) pp. 57–70.
- Latin and Dutch: Jansen, Hubertus P. H. and Antheunis Janse eds., Kroniek van het klooster Bloemhof te Wittewierum (Hilversum, 1991).
- Latin and Spanish: Ferreiro Almeparte, Jaime, Arribadas de Normandos y cruzados a las costas de la península ibérica (Madrid, 1999).
- Latin and English: Villegas-Aristizábal, Lucas, "A Frisian Perspective on Crusading in Iberia as Part of the Sea Journey to the Holy Land, 1217–1218," Studies in Medieval and Renaissance History, 3rd Series 15 (2018), 110–149.
