= Gesta crucigerorum Rhenanorum =

The Gesta crucigerorum Rhenanorum ('Deeds of the Rhineland Crusaders'), otherwise called [Ex] Historia expeditionum in Terram Sanctam ('[From the] History of the Expedition to the Holy Land'), is an anonymous Latin eyewitness account of the Fifth Crusade written by a cleric from Neuss who travelled with a fleet from the Rhineland. It covers the period 1217–1219 and was written shortly after the capture of Damietta. It ends with the return of the Rhenish crusaders and does not describe the disastrous end of the crusade.

The text is divided into seven sections. There is an English translation of the first part covering the siege of Alcácer do Sal. Georg Waitz suggested that the Gesta was written by the same Goswin who wrote the Carmen de expugnatione Salaciae, a poem about the siege of Alcácer. Unlike the Carmen, the Gesta does not report any miracles in connection with the capture of Alcácer. The Gesta is especially valuable for its report that at the time of the decision to attack Alcácer in the summer of 1217, it was known among the crusaders that King Frederick II of Germany would not be departing on crusade that year.

The narration of the journey of the Rhenish crusaders parallels that of the Frisian in the narrative known as De itinere Frisonum. Although both text corroborate each other as far as to Lisbon, where Frisian and Rhenish crusaders split, there are some discrepancies regarding the command of the fleet the beginning of the journey.

The Gesta was used as a source by Caesarius of Heisterbach and was incorporated with some modifications into the third continuation of the Chronica regia Coloniensis. There are two manuscript copies of the Gesta:

- London, British Library, Burney 351, folios 223–227 (13th century)
- Leiden, Universitaire Bibliotheken, VLF 95, folios 2–5 (15th century)

== Bibliography ==
- Bird, Jessalynn; Peters, Edward; Powell, James M., eds. (2013). Crusade and Christendom: Annotated Documents in Translation from Innocent III to the Fall of Acre, 1187–1291. University of Pennsylvania Press.
- "Gesta Crucigerorum Rhenanorum". Geschichtsquellen des deutschen Mittelalters. Bayerische Akademie der Wissenschaften. 2022.
- Lay, Stephen (2009). The Reconquest Kings of Portugal: Political and Cultural Reorientation on the Medieval Frontier. Palgrave Macmillan.
- Powell, James M. (1986). Anatomy of a Crusade, 1213–1221. University of Pennsylvania.
- Röhricht, Reinhold, ed. (1879). Quinti belli sacri scriptores minores. Geneva.
- Villegas-Aristizábal, Lucas (2018). "A Frisian Perspective on Crusading in Iberia as Part of the Sea Journey to the Holy Land, 1217–1218". Studies in Medieval and Renaissance History. 3rd ser. 15: 67–149.
- Wilson, Jonathan, ed. (2021). The Conquest of Santarém and Goswin's Song of the Conquest of Alcácer do Sal: Editions and Translations of De expugnatione Scalabis and Gosuini de expugnatione Salaciae carmen. Routledge.
- Waitz, Georg, ed. (1880). "Ex historia expeditionum in Terram Sanctam". Chronica regia Coloniensis (Annales maximi Colonienses). Monumenta Germaniae Historica, Scriptores rerum Germanicarum. Vol. 18. Hanover. pp. xxiii–xxiv, 339–348.
