= Sado River =

River in southern Portugal

Coordinates: 38.4894°N 8.92333°W

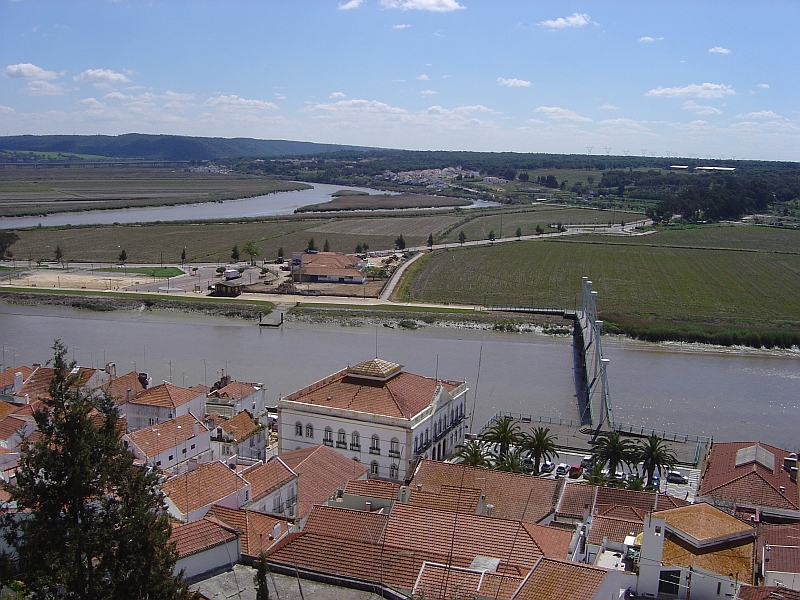
- The Sado River as seen from the castle of Alcácer do Sal

Location
- Country: Portugal

Physical characteristics
- Source
  - location: Serra da Vigia, Ourique
  - elevation: 230 m (750 ft)
- Mouth
  - location: Atlantic Ocean at Setúbal
  - elevation: 0 m (0 ft)
- Length: 175 km (109 mi)
- Basin size: 7,692 km^{2} (2,970 sq mi)

Basin features
- Tributaries
  - right: Xarrama River

The Sado (European Portuguese pronunciation: [ˈsaðu]) is a river in southern Portugal; it is one of the major rivers in the country. It flows in a northerly direction (the only major Portuguese river to do so) through 175 kilometres (109 mi) from its springs in the hills of Ourique before entering the Atlantic Ocean in an estuary in the city of Setúbal.

The estuary is the habitat of a large community of bottlenose dolphins; there are 31 members of the pod, each of whom has been named (2007).

The river is dammed in several places, chiefly for irrigation of rice, maize, and vegetables.

In its course, the river crosses the city of Alcácer do Sal.
