= Siege of Aachen (1248) =

Siege in Germany

Coordinates: 50°45′35″N 5°57′23″E

The siege of Aachen, which lasted from late April or early May until October 1248, was part of the German civil war that began with Pope Gregory IX's proclamation of a crusade against the Emperor Frederick II in 1240. The city of Aachen, which was the traditional coronation site of German kings, supported Frederick II and refused to allow his rival, Count William II of Holland, to enter the city to be crowned. William and his supports besieged the city, forcing it to allow him in, where he was crowned German king.

The main primary sources for the siege are the Royal Chronicle of Cologne, the Chronicle of the Monastery of Bloemhof and Matthew of Paris's History of the English.

== Background ==
The crusade launched in 1240 was the second against Frederick II, a declared enemy of the church. The first crusade, also called the War of the Keys, lasted from 1228 until 1230, when Frederick and the papacy were reconciled and he was re-admitted to communion. In 1239, he was excommunicated a second time, and when he threatened to march on Rome Gregory IX proclaimed a crusade. In 1245, Pope Innocent IV declared Frederick deposed and the prince-electors loyal to the papacy elected Henry Raspe, the landgrave of Thuringia, as the new German king (to be crowned emperor at a later date by the pope). On 16 February 1247, Henry died and the electors chose William of Holland as his successor on 3 October 1247.

== Siege ==
When the city of Aachen refused to allow William's supporters in, they began to surround it to besiege it in late April or early May. William was at Kaiserswerth as late as May 1 and may not have taken part in the opening of the siege. The siege opened with a skirmish by one of the city gates that left sixteen attackers and one defender dead. William had arrived with a large army by May 7, and Cardinal Pietro Capocci, the papal legate, arrived in the middle of May.

The chronicle of Bloemhof records that William's supporters who were present at the siege included the archbishop of Cologne and the bishop-elect of Liège, John of Enghien, and Counts Otto II of Guelders and John I of Hainaut. Despite the presence of the counts and their retinues, the besieging force was not large enough to completely invest (surround) the city, leaving the defenders a means of supply and communication. In an effort to force the defenders into submission, the city was pounded by trebuchets. A large dam, 12 metres (39 ft) high, was built to stop up the river Wurm, which flooded a third of the city.

The preaching of the crusade had its effect in the summer, when the besiegers were joined by reinforcements from Brabant, Flanders and Artois. In the autumn, a West Frisian contingent arrived and encamped on the eastern side of the city, completing the investment. These Frisians, subjects of William as count of Holland, had taken vows to join the crusade of Louis IX to the Holy Land, but these had been commuted to allow them to join the crusade against Frederick II instead.

With the arrival of the Frisians, Aachen was cut off from supplies. The besiegers continued to bombard the city day and night with mangonels and pedreros (stone-throwers), according to Matthew of Paris. On the brink of starvation, the citizens negotiated their surrender with their bishop, the archbishop of Cologne, on 18 October. The imperial bailiff of the city and the twelve noble citizens pledged obedience to Pope Innocent and King William and were not punished further. William entered the city on 19 October and was crowned on 1 November.

== Aftermath ==
The siege of Aachen was not the first nor the last siege William had to lay in order to establish himself in Germany. He began at least fourteen separate sieges between 1247 and 1251. That of Aachen, however, was the largest military endeavour, requiring enough troops to surround the entire city, most of them kept in the field for six months.

On 3 November, William as king confirmed the rights and freedoms of the West Frisians that had supposedly been granted by his predecessor, Charlemagne, almost 450 years earlier. Taking account of the help the Frisians had given him, he renewed and confirmed "all rights, liberties and privileges conceded to all Frisians by Emperor Charles the Great, our predecessor".

== Sources ==
- Hägermann, D.; Kruisheer, J. G.; Gawlik, A., eds. (1989). Die urkunden Heinrich Raspes und Wilhelms von Holland, 1246–1252. Monumenta Germaniae Historica, Diplomata Regum et Imperatorum Germaniae, vol. XVIII, part I. Hanover: Hahnsche Buchhandlung.
- Knödler, Julia (2010). "Aachen, Siege of". In Clifford J. Rogers (ed.). The Oxford Encyclopedia of Medieval Warfare and Military Technology. Oxford University Press. Translated from the German by Duane Henderson.
- Maier, Christoph T. (1998). Preaching the Crusades: Mendicant Friars and the Cross in the Thirteenth Century. Cambridge University Press.
- Raccagni, Gianluca (2016). "The Crusade Against Frederick II: A Neglected Piece of Evidence" (PDF). Journal of Ecclesiastical History. 67 (4): 721–40. doi:10.1017/S002204691600066X. hdl:20.500.11820/254ed423-3dd5-4255-85ec-feaf8a2ad6e1.
- Scales, Len (2012). The Shaping of German Identity: Authority and Crisis, 1245–1414. Cambridge University Press.
- Toch, Michael (1995). "The Medieval German City under Siege". In Ivy A. Corfis; Michael Wolfe (eds.). The Medieval City under Siege. Boydell. pp. 35–48.
