= Chronica regia Coloniensis =

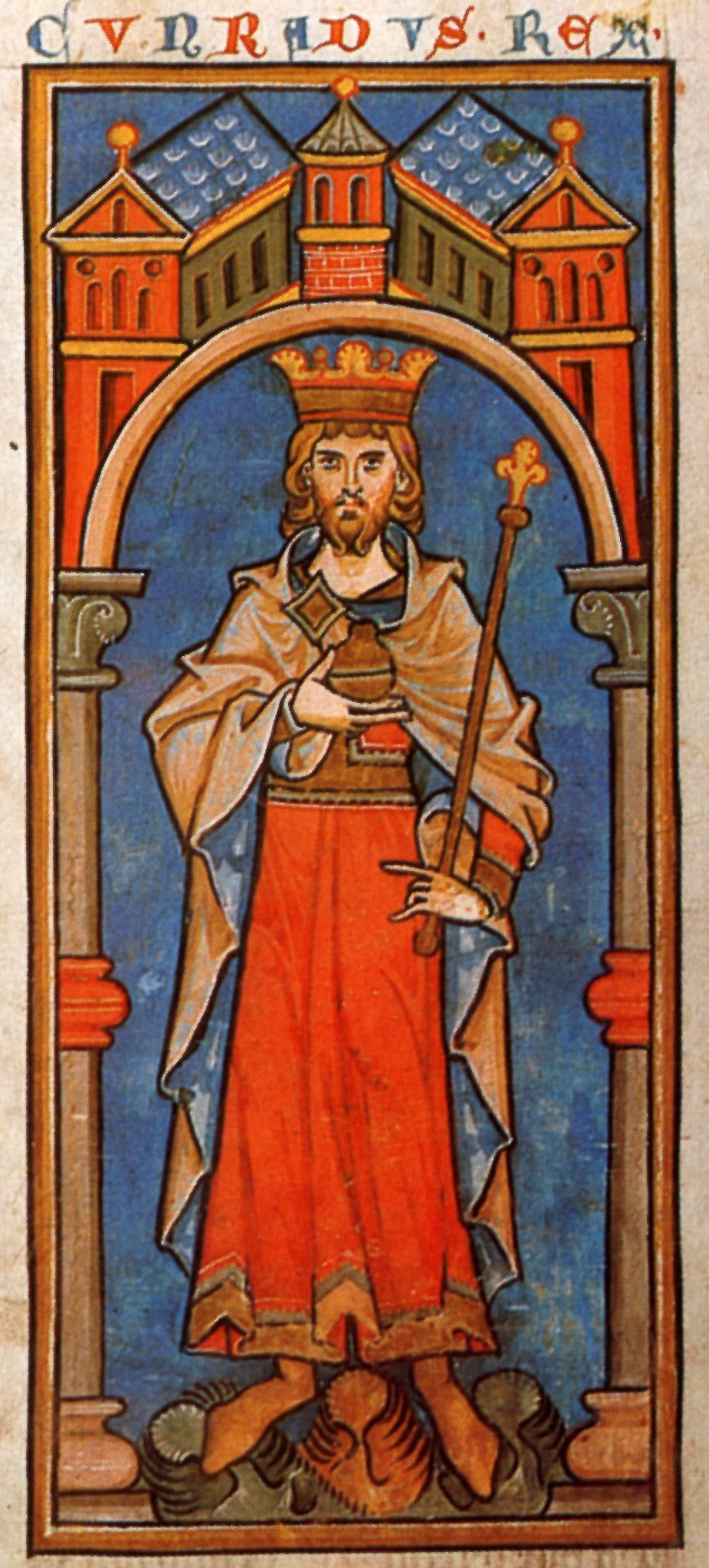
Conrad III from the Bibliothèque royale de Belgique, MS 467, folio 64 verso. This manuscript, from about 1240, contains the Chronica sancti Pantaleonis.

The Chronica regia Coloniensis ("Royal Chronicle of Cologne", German: Kölner Königschronik), also called the Annales Colonienses maximi, is an anonymous medieval Latin chronicle that covers the years 576 to 1202. The original chronicle only went up to 1197, but a continuator later added the following few years' events. Further continuators in the 13th century extended it down to 1249. According to the historian Manfred Groten, the Chronica was probably first compiled about 1177 in Michaelsberg Abbey, Siegburg, and then continued in Cologne. The earliest manuscript only contains an account down to 1175.

The chronicle is called "royal" because it is a history of the Roman emperors, Frankish kings, Byzantine emperors and German kings and emperors. It probably began with Augustus, but the beginning of the chronicle is lost. Up to 1106 the Chronica depends on the works of Frutolf von Michelsberg and Ekkehard of Aura, and then on until 1144 on the now lost Annales Patherbrunnenses. After that it is an independent source. The author of the Chronica sancti Pantaleonis made use of the royal chronicle to cover the years down to 1199, and the historian Georg Waitz treated the former as a mere continuation of the latter and edited them together.

The author of the Chronica had access to a letter of Rainald of Dassel, archbishop of Cologne, which gave him important information on the emperor's Italian expedition of 1166. He also knew details of the reconquest of Lisbon and the Second Crusade in 1147 because a contingent from the Rhineland took part. A continuator included an account of how the crusaders captured Alcácer do Sal, now known as the Gesta crucigerorum Rhenanorum.

== Sources ==
- Waitz, Georg (ed.) "Chronica regia Coloniensis cum continuationibus in monasterio S. Pantaleonis scriptis aliisque Coloniensis monumentis partim ex monumentis Germaniae historicis recusa" MGH, Scriptores rerum Germanicarum, 18. Hanover: 1880.
- Wolf, Jürgen. "Chronica regia Coloniensis". Encyclopedia of the Medieval Chronicle. Graeme Dunphy, ed. Brill Online, 2013.
