= Frisian involvement in the Crusades =

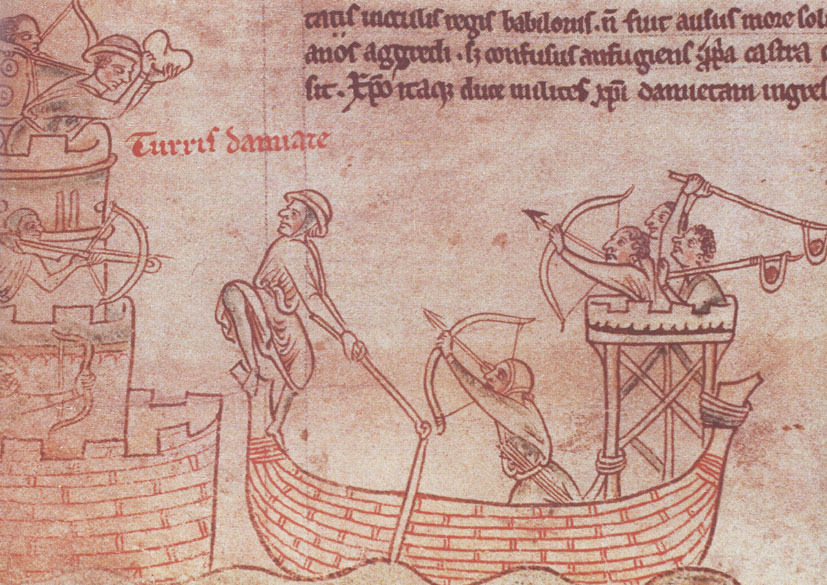
Frisian crusaders attack the tower of Damietta during the Fifth Crusade (from the 13th-century Chronica Majora of Matthew Paris)

Frisian involvement in the Crusades is attested from the very beginning of the First Crusade, but their presence is only felt substantially during the Fifth Crusade. They participated in almost all the major Crusades and the Reconquista. The Frisians are almost always referred to collectively by contemporary chroniclers of the Crusades and few names of individual Frisian crusaders can be found in the historical record. They generally composed a naval force in conjunction with other larger bodies of crusaders.

The first Frisians to participate in the First Crusade were part of the army which was led to the Holy Land by Godfrey of Bouillon and they are only mentioned in passing by Fulcher of Chartres, who mentions that the Frisian language was one of the many tongues spoken by the crusaders. William of Tyre, drawing his information from Fulcher, mentions Frisians as part of the troops led by Godfrey at the Siege of Antioch in 1097–1098. According to Albert of Aix, there was also a fleet of pirates, hailing from Denmark, Frisia, and Flanders and led by Guynemer of Boulogne, who assisted Baldwin of Boulogne at Tarsus.

Although unsubstantiated by any contemporary writing, the apocryphal sixteenth-century Frisian chronicler Ocko Scharlensis and the early seventeenth-century historian Ubbo Emmius wrote in some detail of eight Frisian nobles who allegedly took up the cross and followed Peter the Hermit to the Holy Land during the People's Crusade of 1096. Of the eight—Tjepke Forteman, Jarig Ludingaman, Feike Botnia, Elke and Sicco Lyauckama (cousins), Epe Hartman, Ige Galama, and Obboke (Ubbo) Hermana, son of Hessel—only two, Botnia and Sicco Lyauckama, were said to have survived the pilgrimage to Jerusalem.

With news of the fall of Edessa in 1144, a large force of Danes, Swedes, Scots, Welshmen, Englishmen, Normans, Frenchmen, Flemings, Germans, and Frisians assembled in connection with the Second Crusade about 200 ships, which left from Dartmouth in 1147 on the way to the Holy Land through the Straits of Gibraltar. Though there is no further mention of Frisians, they probably participated in the successful Siege of Lisbon in late summer and early fall. A thirteenth-century legend praises the Frisian knight Poptatus Ulvinga from Wirdum, who was supposed to have led the siege with the help of a heavenly army under the command of Saint Maurice. Apparently, his grave was marked by a palm tree, whose fruits caused miraculous healings. There must have been some confusion, however, with the grave of another knight, Henry of Bonn.

In 1189, as they were en route to the Siege of Acre as a contingent of the Third Crusade, a fleet of Frisians, Danes, Flemings, and Germans, assisted by a small Portuguese presence, in about 50 ships attacked and took Alvor, massacring its Muslim inhabitants. Frisian ships, perhaps the same ones as took Alvor, are mentioned as present at Acre under the command of James of Avesnes: these Frisians arrived in connection with Danish ships according to the Itinerarium Peregrinorum or Breton and German ships, according to Ernoul.

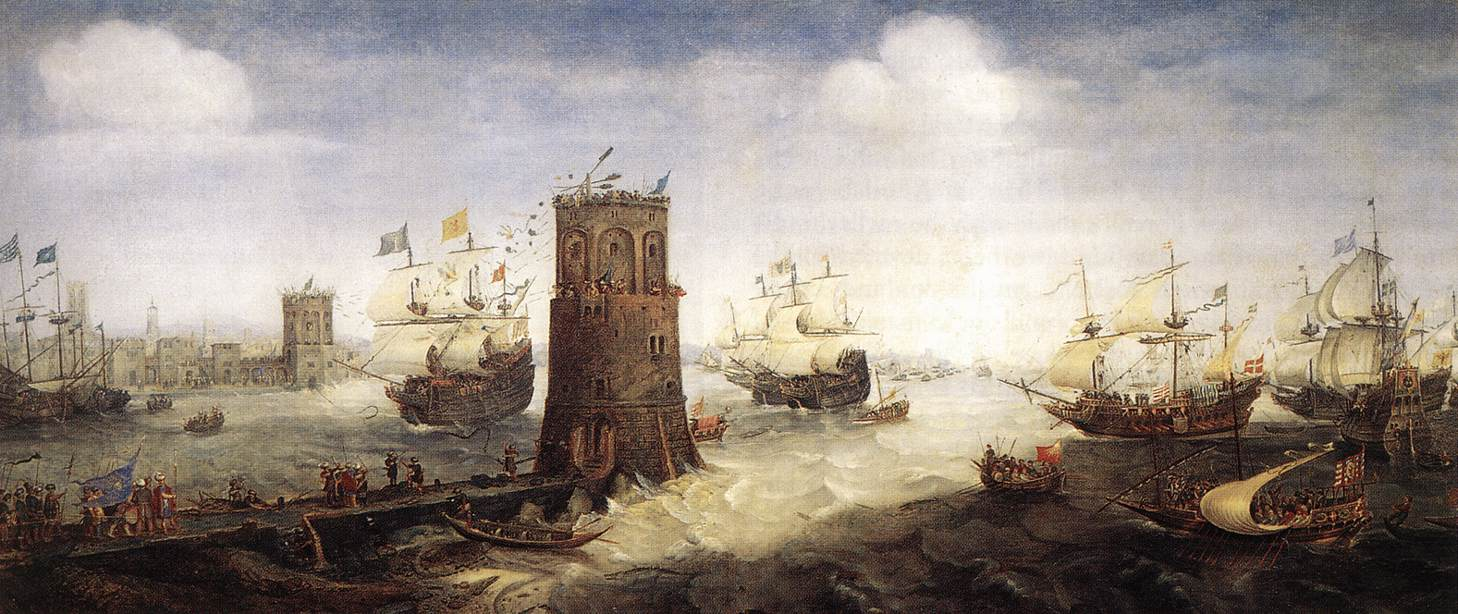
Frisian crusaders attack the tower of Damietta in a painting by Cornelis Claesz van Wieringen.

Around 1209 there were Frisians in the army of the Albigensian Crusade and around 1215, the Frisians responded to the preaching of the Fifth Crusade by Oliver of Paderborn and promised a fleet. According to the De itinere Frisonum they sailed in the spring of 1217 and they met the crusading fleet at the English port of Dartmouth. From there they sailed to Lisbon, where they refused to help the Portuguese take the city of Alcácer do Sal. A detachment of the Frisian fleet then sacked the Almohad-controlled cities Faro, Rota and Cádiz before continuing on to the East. Under the count of Holland, William I, they arrived in a mixed army consisting of Dutch and Flemish soldiers. They participated in the Siege of Damietta of 1218–1219 in Egypt, but the Frisian contingent returned home early and the siege ended in failure.

Between the summer of 1228 and winter of 1231, Bishop Willibrand of Utrecht preached a crusade indulgence in Frisia, recruiting soldiers for his war against the heretical Drenthers. Numerous Frisians took up the offer, but the crusade ended inconclusively in 1232.

A large bloc of Frisians vowed to join the Seventh Crusade in 1247 and 1248, but their vows were commuted by Pope Innocent IV in order to allow them to join their lord, William II of Holland, in fighting the pope's enemy, Frederick II, Holy Roman Emperor. They participated in the siege of Aachen and, on 3 November 1248, William, now crowned king of Germany, confirmed the rights and freedoms that had supposedly been granted them by Charlemagne. Frisians, however, were involved in Saint Louis's Eighth Crusade which assaulted Tunis in 1270. They were under the protection of Charles I of Naples when travelling through his lands, because he ordered the seneschal of Provence to reimburse them and two Dominicans travelling with them for some 300 marks that were stolen in Marseille.

In the Late Middle Ages and the early modern period the prestige of participation in the Crusades coupled with the legendary nature of what most people knew about the First Crusade encouraged many Europeans to invent fictitious genealogies making their ancestors warriors who had helped take Jerusalem in 1099 or to commission the writing of supposed histories of their ancestors to prove that they too had participated in the early Crusades. Some of these legendary accounts were probably outright fabrications while others were based on tenuous and shaky premises. Much the same type of arguments — "if so-and-so was present at Jerusalem in 1099, then certainly my ancestor of the same period must also have been there" — have been employed in England to attach one's ancestors to the Battle of Hastings.
