= Pium dictamen =

Christian hymn

The pium dictamen (plural pia dictamina), known in German as a Reimgebet or Leselied, is a Christian hymn for private devotion, generally rhyming and often using acrostics. The genre is highly variable. It includes "psalters" (psalteria) with 150 strophes and "rosaries" (rosaria) with 50. Another type was the "gloss song" (Glossenlied, prière glosée), in which a popular prayer was divided up by word, with each word be "glossed" by a stanza of commentary. They were popular in both Latin and the vernacular and were sometimes multilingual.

The hymn Stabat Mater was originally a pium dictamen.
