= Emo of Friesland =

Frisian scholar

In the right column, the change in handwriting indicates the end of Emo's and the start of Menko's chronicle

Emo of Friesland (c. 1175–1237) was a Frisian scholar and abbot who probably came from the region of Groningen, and the earliest foreign student studying at Oxford University whose name has survived. He wrote a Latin chronicle, later expanded by his successors Menco and Foltert into the Chronicon abbatum in Werum (chronicle of the abbots of Wittewierum).

Emo was of high birth. He began his studies at Oxford in 1190. He also studied at the University of Paris and at Orléans. Following his studies, he returned to Frisia to take up a post as schoolmaster in Westeremden and parish priest in Huizinge. Around 1209, he took the vows of a monk in order to assist his uncle, Emo of Romerswerf, in founding a monastery in Holwierde near Groningen. Under Emo's direction as first abbot, the monastery of Floridus Hortus (Wittewierum, Bloemhof) joined the Premonstratensians and became a daughter house of Prémontré Abbey in 1217.

Emo's section of the Chronicon covers the years 1203–1237. Besides information about the abbey he helped found, it also covers the secular history of Frisia and Groningen and even the Crusades to the Holy Land. According to his own writing he copied a naval itinerary of the Frisian's fleet's journey from the delta of the River Lauwers to Acre (1217–1218). This text is known as the De itinere Frisonum and it provides a lot of details about the naval voyage and the crusading motivations of the Frisian participants. According to the continuation by Menco, Emo also wrote the works De anima (on the soul), Arbor vitiorum et virtutum (tree of vices and virtues), De differentia criminum (on different crimes) and De differentia virtutum politicarum et theologicarum (on the difference between political and theological virtues). All of these works are thought lost.
