= Chronicle of 1419 =

Vernacular chronicle of kings of Portugal

The Chronicle of 1419 is a vernacular Portuguese chronicle of the reigns of the first seven kings of Portugal from 1139 to 1357: Afonso I, Sancho I, Afonso II, Sancho II, Afonso III, Denis and Afonso IV. It is the first true history of Portugal. Earlier historiography produced in Portugal is more general and lacks a distinctly Portuguese focus, but in the Chronicle of 1419 "for the first time, the kingdom [of Portugal] is the field of observation." The work is anonymous. It has sometimes been attributed to Fernão Lopes, but this is disputed. It is based on earlier written sources, now lost. It has a late and defective manuscript tradition. The two main witnesses—Biblioteca Publica Municipal do Porto 886 and Casa dos Duques de Cadaval M-VIIl-15—both date to the 16th century. Long sections of the text were incorporated into the chronicles of António Galvão and Rui de Pina.

The Chronicle is known by several Portuguese titles, depending on the edition. These include Crónica de Portugal de 1419, Crónica de 1419, Crónica de cinco reis de Portugal ('chronicle of five kings of Portugal') and Crónicas dos sete primeiros reis de Portugal ('chronicle of the first seven kings of Portugal'). The different names come from the fact that the manuscript Porto 886 is incomplete, breaking off in the reign of Afonso III. The common name of the chronicle comes from the date of the start of composition, 1 July 1457 of the Hispanic era, corresponding to AD 1419, as revealed in an early passage. It appears the original intention was to bring the work down to the reign of John I (1385–1433), but it was never completed.

== Editions ==
- Adelino de Almeida Calado, ed. (1998). Crónica de Portugal de 1419. Aveiro.
- Artur de Magalhães Basto, ed. (1945). Crónica de cinco reis de Portugal. Porto.
- Carlos da Silva Tarouca, ed. (1952–1953). Crónicas dos sete primeiros reis de Portugal. Lisbon. 3 vols.

== Works cited ==
- Afonso, Carlos Filipe (2018). "Gosuini de Expugnatione Salaciae Carmen: Analysing a Source Through a Strategy Theoretical Corpus". Revista Ciências Militares. 6 (1): 39–61.
- Alfonso-Pinto, Ester Fátima (1999). The "Crónica de Cinco Reis de Portugal": The Influence of Castilian Historiography on the Epic Tradition of D. Afonso Henriques (PhD dissertation) (in Spanish). University of Texas at Austin. ProQuest 9947157
- Alves Moreira, Filipe (2010). A Crónica de Portugal de 1419: Fontes, Estratégias e Posteridade (PDF) (PhD dissertation). University of Porto.
- Amado, Teresa (2010). "Crónica de 1419". In Graeme Dunphy (ed.). Encyclopedia of the Medieval Chronicle. Vol. 1. Brill. p. 285.
- Vasconcelos e Sousa, Bernardo (2007). "Medieval Portuguese Royal Chronicles: Topics in a Discourse of Identity and Power" (PDF). e-Journal of Portuguese History. 5 (2): 1–7.
- Vilares Cepeda, Isabel (1995). Bibliografia da Prosa Medieval em Língua Portuguesa. Biblioteca Nacional Portugal.
- Villegas-Aristizábal, Lucas (2019). "Was the Portuguese Led Military Campaign against Alcácer do Sal in the Autumn of 1217 Part of the Fifth Crusade?". Al-Masāq. 31 (1): 50–67. doi:10.1080/09503110.2018.1542573. S2CID 165784582.
