= Siege of Faro (1249) =

1249 battle of the Reconquista

- Part of the Portuguese Reconquista
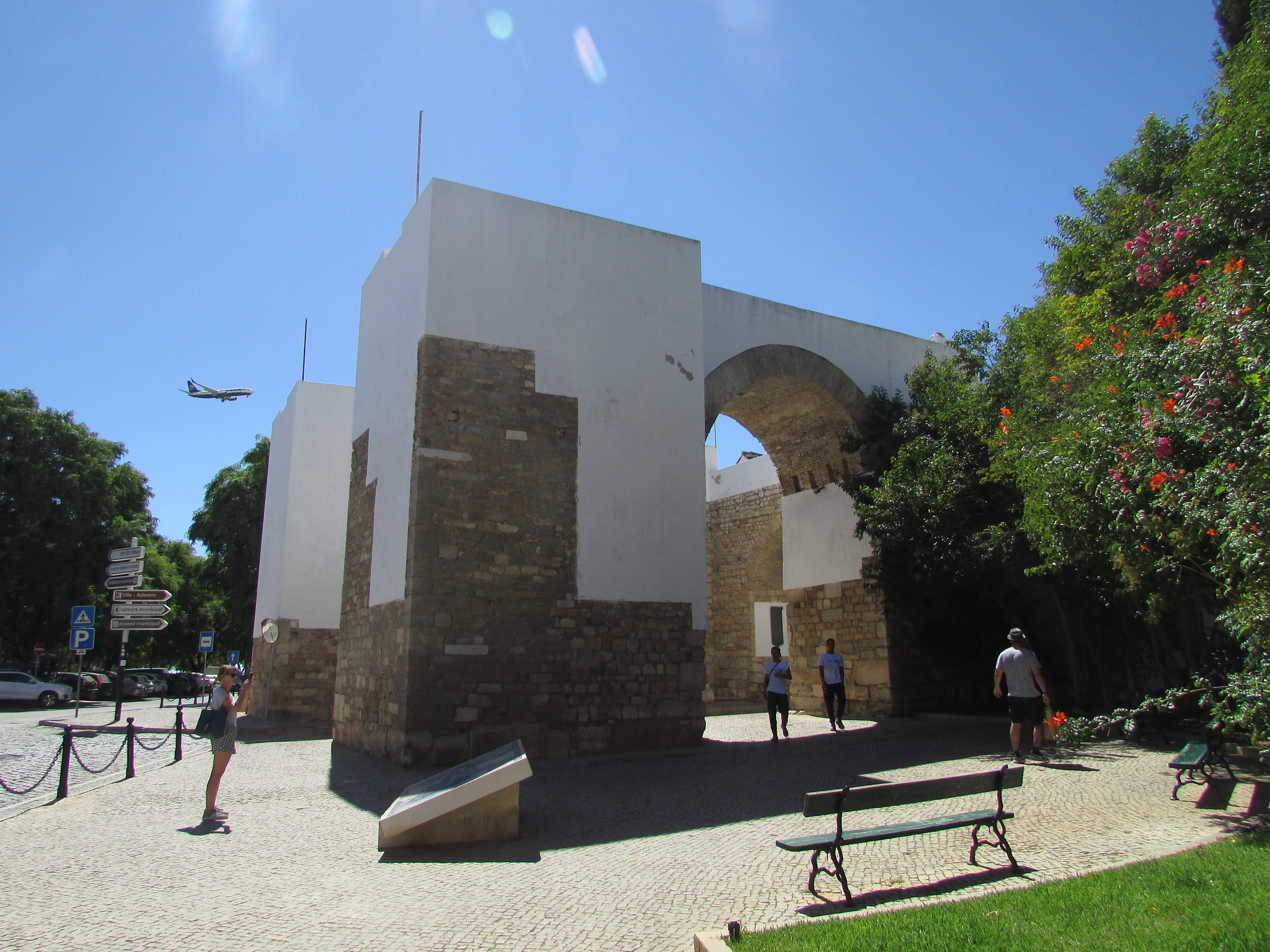
- Medieval gateway of the castle of Faro.
Date	March 1249
Location	Faro, Portugal
Result	Portuguese victory

Belligerents
Portugal; Order of Santiago; Order of Aviz	Taifa of Niebla

Commanders and leaders
Afonso III of Portugal; Paio Peres Correia	Unknown

The siege of Faro occurred when Portuguese forces, under the command of King Afonso III of Portugal, captured the city of Faro in 1249 from the Taifa of Niebla. The event marked the end of Portuguese Reconquista efforts in the Iberian Peninsula.

The conquest took place in the context of the gradual conquest of the cities of the Guadiana valley and the eastern part of the Algarve from Ibn-Mahfuz, lord of the taifa of Niebla and the last representative of Muslim power in western Al-Andalus. The fall of Mértola, Tavira, Ayamonte, Cacela and the fall of Seville in 1248, left Ibn-Mahfuz completely isolated, and with no other choice but to come to terms with Ferdinand III of Castile.

The city of Faro, isolated and without hope of relief from forces of the Muslim world, capitulated before a fierce and well disciplined force, even though such a force was probably composed of a small number of men. This explains why contemporary Muslim sources refer to the event as the city having been "delivered" to the King of Portugal.

The city was taken in March 1249, as evidenced by the deed of donation by the King of some houses in Santarém to lord João Peres de Aboim, signed in Faro that month, when in February of that year the king is documented to have been in Ourém. The capture of the nearby villages of Albufeira, Porches and a few other small settlements quickly followed still in that same year.

It is likely that King Afonso III himself took part in the campaign against the city, albeit discreetly, as did the Master of the Order of Santiago, lord Paio Peres Correia. In the event, just as in the conquest of the rest of the Algarve, the absence of members of the main families of Portugal can be observed according to some authors, with those who partook in the capture in Faro being mostly second-borns and bastard children of the nobility, reflecting the importance of military acts for those who could expect little from their inheritance. Some of them were handsomely rewarded, giving rise to families that would mark Portugal in the late 13th century and in the following century.

The knights of the military orders, above all those of the Order of Santiago and the Order of Aviz played an important role, and among the main nobles who participated were Avigas Loure, his brother-in-law the castellan of Santarém Martim Dade, the chancellor Estevão Anes, and Mem Soares de Melo.

Portuguese ownership of the Algarve was disputed by Castille, and it was only recognized when the Treaty of Alcanizes was signed in 1297, with Papal mediation.

== See also ==
- Portugal in the Reconquista
- Gharb al-Andalus
- Kingdom of Algarve
