= Portugaliae Monumenta Historica =

Collection of texts from Portuguese history

The Portugaliae Monumenta Historica (Historical Monuments of Portugal, abbreviated PMH) is a collection of texts from Portuguese history. Inspired by the Monumenta Germaniae Historica, it was published by the Academia das Ciências de Lisboa between 1856 and 1917 and divided into four sections: Scriptores (writers), Leges et Consuetudines (laws and customs), Diplomata et Chartae (diplomas and charters) and Inquisitiones (investigations). The first three were compiled under the direction of Alexandre Herculano before 1873, and the last, Inquisitiones, between 1888 and 1897, after his death. The documents date from the Middle Ages and are primarily in Middle Latin and Old Portuguese.
