= Alcácer do Sal =

- Municipality
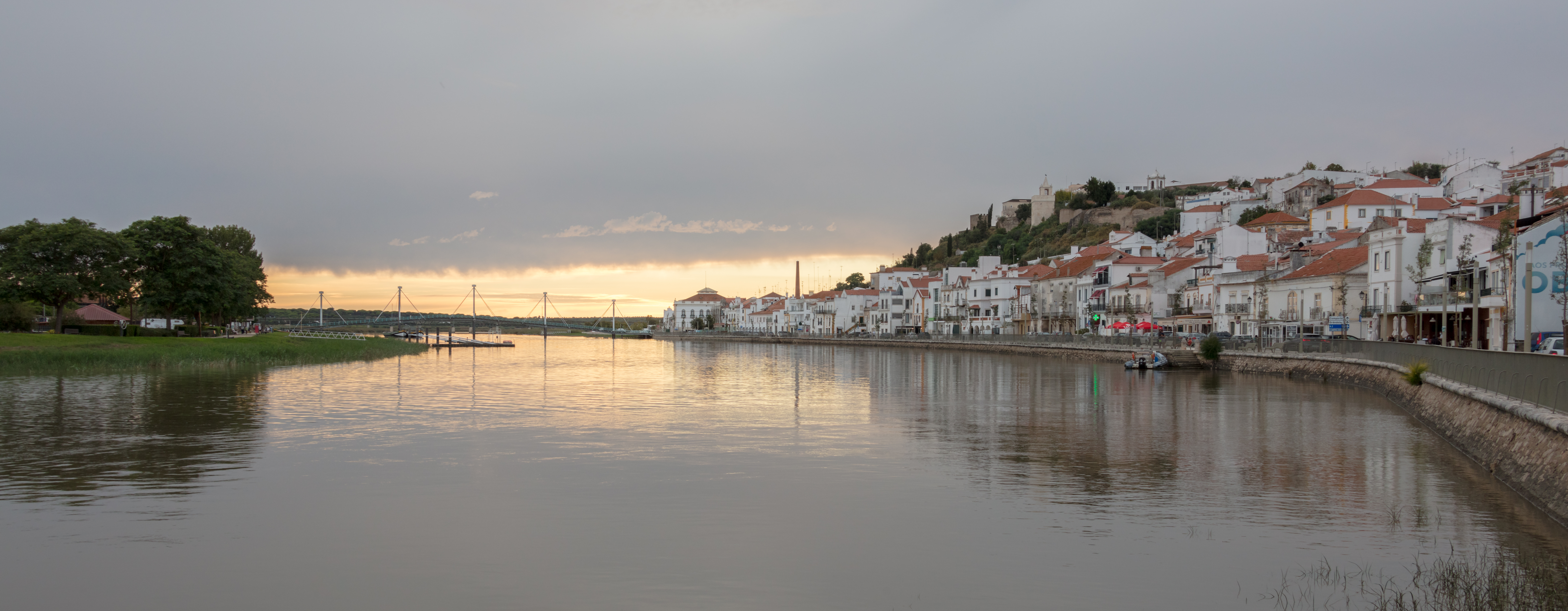
- Panorama of Alcácer do Sal

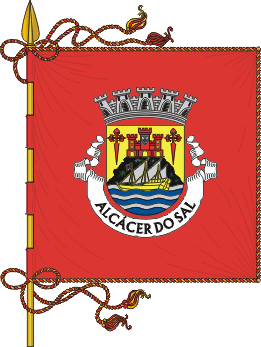
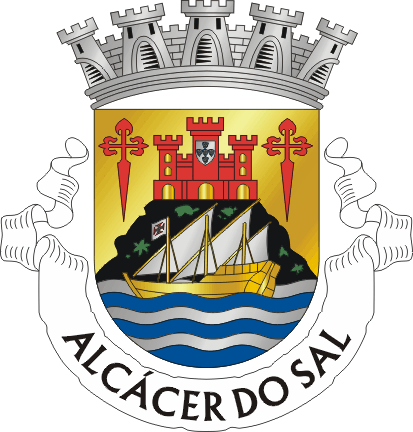
- Flag Coat of arms
- Interactive map of Alcácer do Sal
- Location in Portugal
- Coordinates: 38°22′21″N 8°30′49″W
- Country: Portugal
- Region: Alentejo
- Intermunic. comm.: Alentejo Litoral
- District: Setúbal
- Parishes: 4

Government
  - President: Vitor Manuel Chaves Caro Proença (CDU)

Area
  - Total: 1,499.87 km^{2} (579.10 sq mi)
- Elevation: 49 m (161 ft)

Population (2011)
  - Total: 13,046
  - Density: 8.6981/km^{2} (22.528/sq mi)
- Time zone: UTC+00:00 (WET)
  - Summer (DST): UTC+01:00 (WEST)
- Postal code: 7580
- Area code: 265
- Patron: São João Baptiste
- Website: www.cm-alcacerdosal.pt

Alcácer do Sal (European Portuguese pronunciation: [alˈkasɛɾ ðu ˈsal]) is a municipality in Portugal, located in Setúbal District. The population in 2011 was 13,046, in an area of 1,499.87 km^{2}.

== History ==
=== Earliest settlement ===
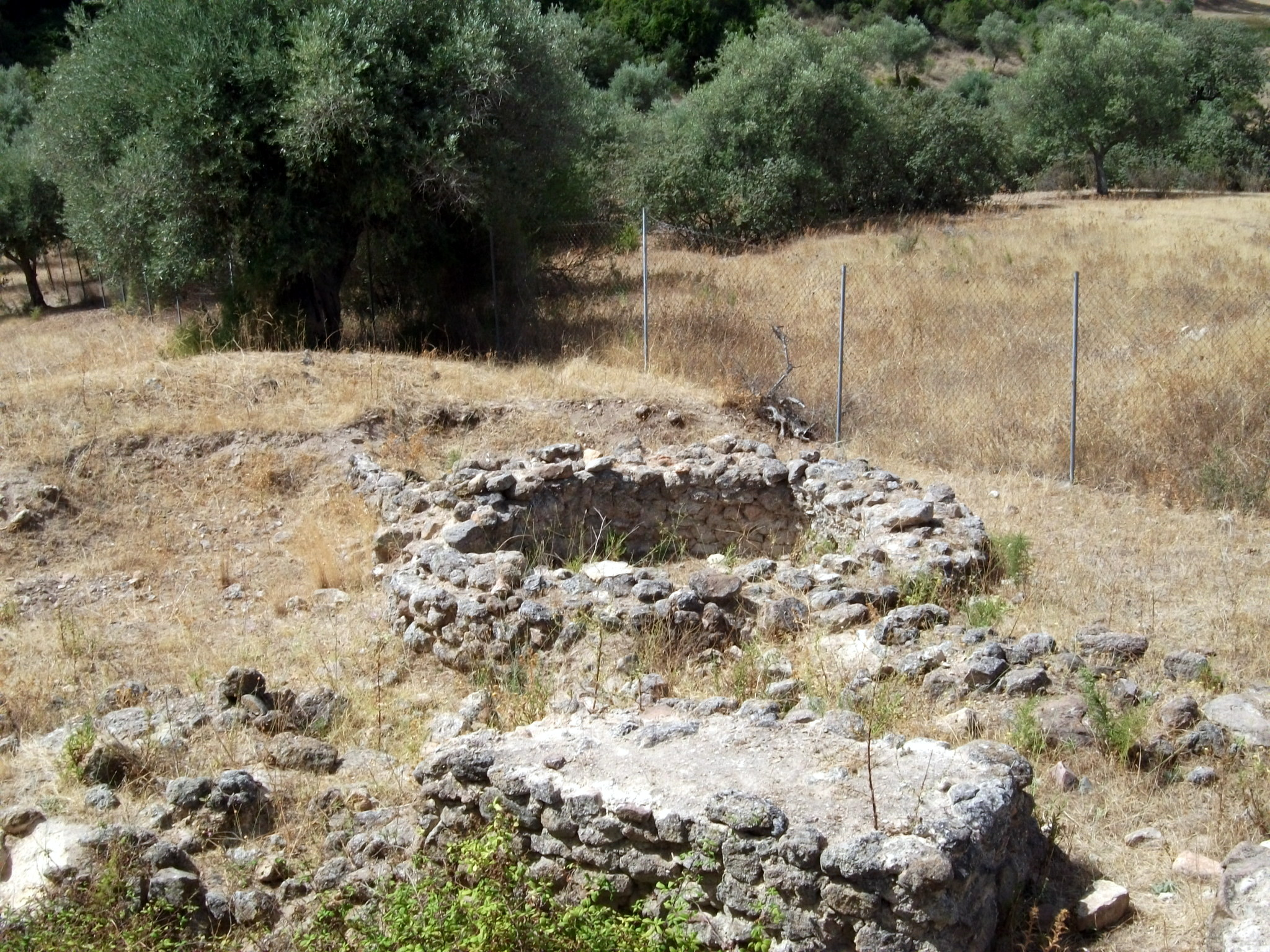
Monte da Tumba, a Chalcolithic proto-urban cluster

There has been human settlement in the area for more than 40,000 years; archaeological investigations have placed human presence here back to the Mesolithic Period, when the first peoples began to concentrate in the areas around Alcácer. This period was characterized by exploitation of the ecosystem in the Sado Estuary, when the river extended to São Romão, involving fishing, scavenging for shellfish, hunting and foraging in the local forests. The primitive tools, made from chert, were adapted from the techniques of the late Paleolithic era. By the late Mesolithic period, people had concentrated in the area of Comporta and Torrão, later establishing primitive defensive protection to support their communities.

These principal settlements were abandoned by the Copper Age, but repopulated during the Iron Age, as was the case of Alcácer. Mediterranean trade, pioneered by the Phoenicians, introduced commercial colonies in Abul and Alcácer (then referred to as Bevipo or Keition), where a written alphabet and currency allowed commerce to flourish.

=== Roman Era ===
After the Third Punic War, with the fall of Carthage, Alcácer was annexed to the Roman Empire (around 1st-2nd century B.C.). The municipality of present Alcácer became known as Urbs Imperatoria Salacia in honor of the sea god Neptune's wife, nymph Salacia, for its importance in the Iberian salt trade and the number of routes that crossed the area. In the third century the port of Salacia fell into disuse thanks to the emergence of Olisipo (Lisbon).

With the rise of Gaul, most of Hispania became a vassal state of the larger empire. Returning to the Imperial fold with the 296AD reorganization of Roman territories by Diocletian (in order to subvert the Military Anarchy that existed at the time), Salatia's role was transformed. Circa 300? it was the seat of a Diocese of Salácia (Portuguese) / Salacien(sis) (Latin) / Salarien(sis) (Latin), which was however suppressed around 350.

In the following centuries, Salatia became a poor distant colony of the much larger centers of Setúbal or Lisbon. The only exception was Torrão, which continued to prosper. Until 711, when the region was annexed by the Umayyad Caliphate of Damascus, the population of the hilltop areas of Salatia left in favor of the low lands along the river.

=== Al-Andalus ===
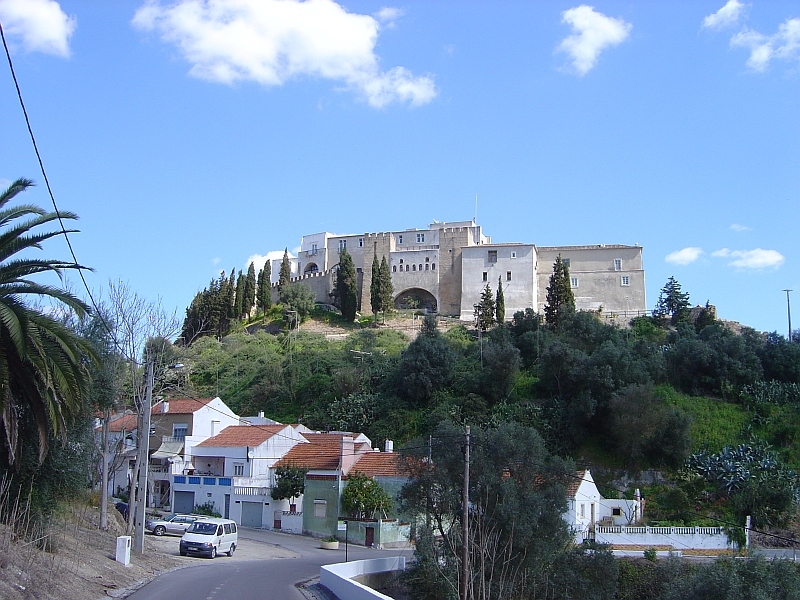
Qaṣr Abī Dānis or simply Al -Qaṣr (English: The Castle), surmounting the town, was a Moorish citadel before the Reconquista

The Umayyad rule on the Iberian Peninsula, in the reign of Abu-l-Khattar (743-745) over the region of Beja, which included Alcácer, was noted for the recruitment of troops, and for the rising power of Yemeni clans in southern Portugal. The entire region was later administered by Egyptian Arab troops, that selected Beja as their regional seat. Until 844, Alcácer functioned as center for the collection of taxes in the lower Sado valley: collected primarily from the Christians who chose to remain in the valley. The first Viking raids in this year forced a political reorganization, and Alcácer became an important outpost of Al-Andalus.

After an internal victory over Muwallad rebels in 888, the city was offered as reward to the Banu Dānis clan, and its keep was renamed Qaṣr Abī Dānis (قصر أبي دانس; English: Castle Abu Denis), commonly known simply as Al-Qaṣr (English: The Castle). The village of Al-Qaṣr was the base for a large fleet and arsenal that was used during the Christian-Moorish Reconquista. In 997 a Moorish fleet transported troops from Alcácer to Porto, to support Al-Mansur Ibn Abi Aamir, that culminated in the destruction of the sanctuary of Santiago de Compostela. It was then capital of the Al-Qaṣr Province, which by the 12th Century was a center of merchant traffic, supported by the opulent tastes of Évora. Muhammad al-Idrisi noted that forestry, and in particular pine tree harvesting, was important during this period, as was cattle raising and major agricultural cultivation. During the Almoravid dynasty Al-Qaṣr became the administrative regional seat of an area that extended along the Atlantic coast until Trujillo, Cáceres.

=== Crusades and Reconquista ===
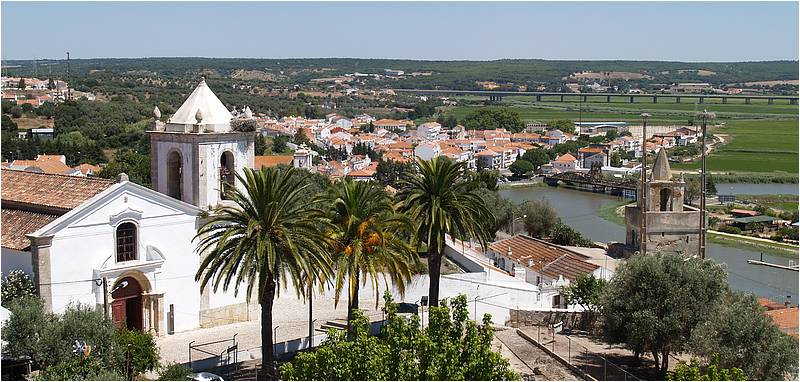
Santa Maria do Castelo church, in the city square of Alcácer, founded after the reconquest of Alcácer in 1217

Records of the Norwegian Crusade, held from 1107 to 1110, in the aftermath of the First Crusade, and led by Norwegian king Sigurd I, include a reference to the Norwegians winning a battle in the town of Alkasse (which is possibly a reference to Al-Qaṣr) - where they killed such a large number of people that the town was said to have been left empty, and looted many treasures. However, the Norwegians then sailed on to the Holy Land and the town - with whatever inhabitants survived - remained Muslim.

During the Fifth Crusade, when Afonso II of Portugal had a truce with the Almohads, Sueiro Bishops of Lisbon and Évora joined the Cistercian abbot of Alcobaça, the commander of Palmela, the Templars, the Hospitallers, and magnates, in an attempt to persuade the crusaders to attack the Moors in Alcácer do Sal. The city of Alcácer had been lost since 1191 in the aftermath of the Third Crusade campaigns of Alvor and Silves. The keep in Alcácer was conquered for the first time by the Portuguese in 1160. In 1191, it returned to Amazigh hands under the direction of Yaqub al-Mansur, who transformed it into the military garrison of Garb al-Andalus. According to De itinere Frisonum the Frisian Crusaders refused to help on account of Innocent III prohibition to Bishop Souiro, and departed for the Holy Land, even after being provided food, expenses, and rousing oratories about the Almohads' annual demands for 100 Christians in tribute. Meanwhile, ships under the command of William I of Holland and Count George of Wied arrived in Alcácer do Sal on 2 August 1217. They were joined by the Portuguese sent to lay siege to the castle. Muslim governors in Seville, Córdoba, Jaén and Badajoz attempted to relieve the garrison but their reinforcements were defeated on 11 September. The castle surrendered on 18 October 1217, with additional Christian troops provided by Pedro Alvítiz from Castile.

Once the castle was taken, many of the northern Crusaders requested Pope Honorius III allow them to remain for a year "for the liberation of Hispania" and "the extirpation of the perfidious cult of the pagans". The victory in Alcácer do Sal also motivated Alfonso IX of León, Sancho VII of Navarre, in addition to Iberian prelates and nobles, to break their truces with the Muslim leaders, in hopes that the northern Crusaders would continue their campaigns the following summer. But, the Pope granted only absolution from their vows to those who could not continue to the Holy Land, and the Crusaders left the Castle to the Portuguese and continued on to Acre.

The capture of Al-Qaṣr was the only permanent conquest of the Fifth Crusade. In 1218, Alcacer do Sal received its foral from King Afonso II, and handed over to the Knights of Santiago, who made it their headquarters during their advance into the Alentejo and Algarve. The Order of Santiago dominated an area from Sesimbra until the Algarve, controlling the lower Sado, Alentejo Litoral and coast of Cape St. Vincent. At the end of the 13th century, the Order advanced to Mértola to support reconquest of the Algarve, but later retreated to Alcácer and remained there until 1482, when they returned to Palmela.

Along with the Christians and the town's small population of Jews, the remaining Muslims in Alcácer do Sal begin to occupy the low country along the river, and vacate the Castle. The Muslims, under the "King's protection" remained in the community.

In 1495, Manuel I was acclaimed King by the residents of the village.

=== Slave trade ===
By the 16th century, the whole Sado Basin, where Alcácer do Sal is located, had experienced an important African immigration as a way to compensate for the demographic deficit that accompanied the Portuguese overseas expansion. Later, in the 18th century, a new wave of slaves was imported to Alcácer do Sal to work the salt fields and cultivate rice, the two important economic activities in the region. A recent genetic study in 2010 found in Alcacer the highest frequencies (22%) of Sub-Saharan maternal lineages reported so far in Europe and, according to the authors, likely associated with the influx of African slaves between the 15th and 19th centuries.

== Geography ==
=== Physical geography ===
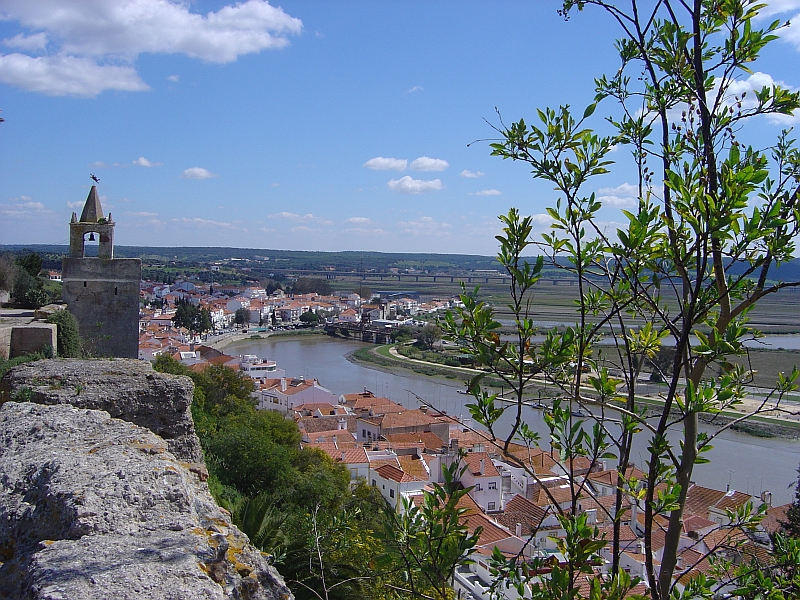
Alcácer do Sal, showing portions of the river and estuary

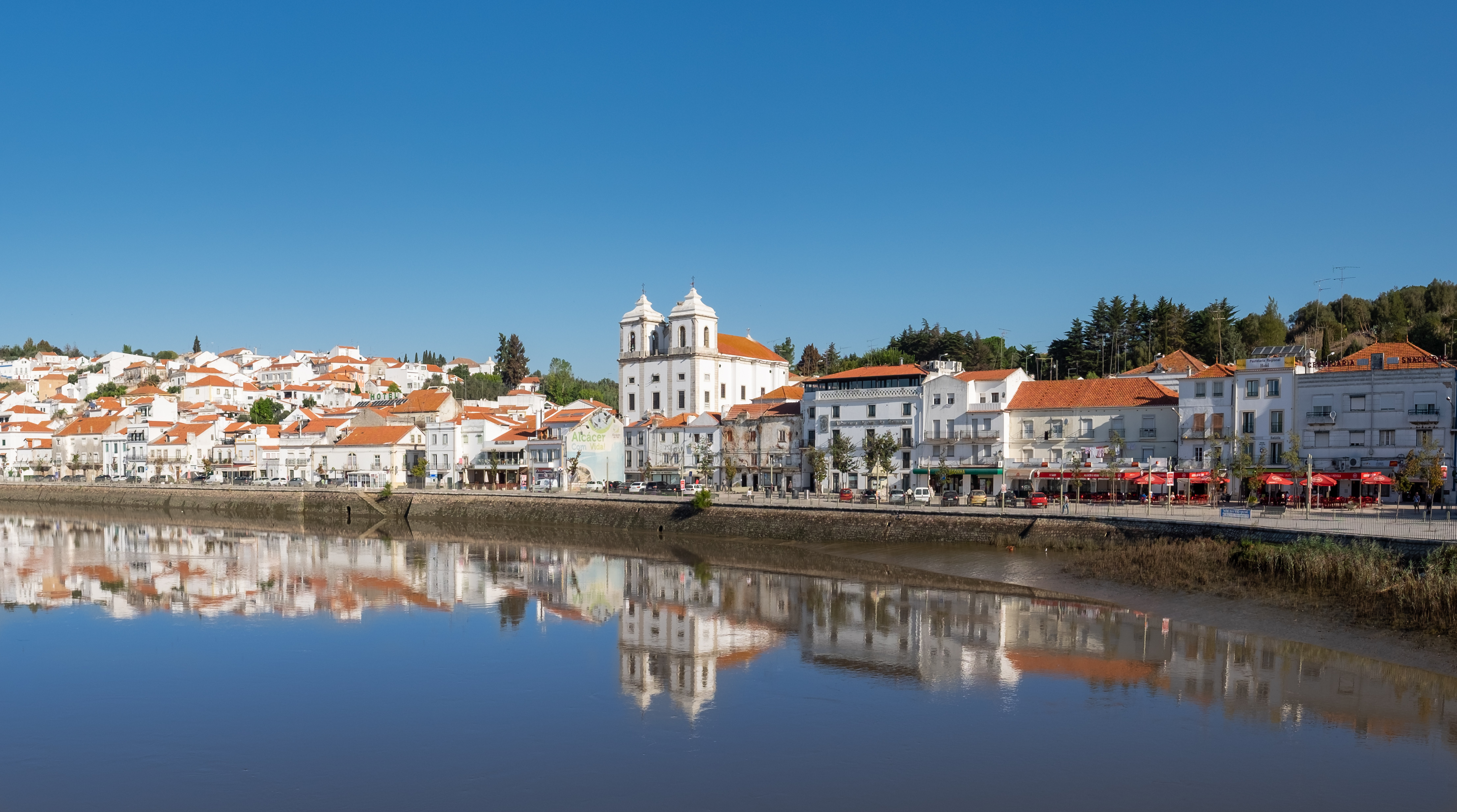
River front along the city center

A few kilometres from the city of Alcácer, along the course of the Sado, is the Reserva Natural do Estuário do Sado (Sado Estuary Nature Reserve) which covers an area of 23.160 hectares (231,600 m^{2}), comprising marshes, canals, streams and mangroves.

=== Human geography ===
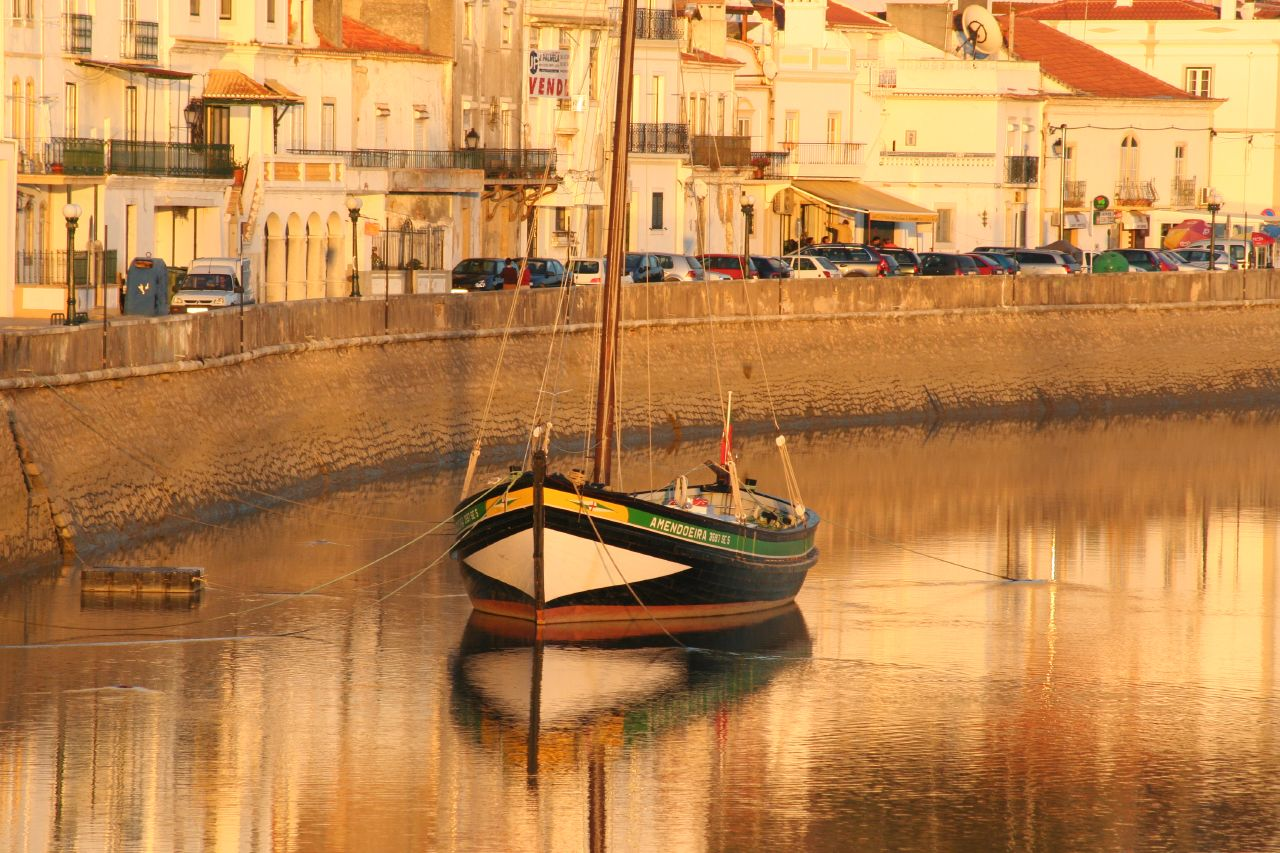
Historical boat along the Sado River in the town of Alcácer do Sal

The municipality is bounded to the north by the municipalities of Palmela, Vendas Novas and Montemor-o-Novo; northeast by Viana do Alentejo; east by Alvito; south by Ferreira do Alentejo and Grândola; to the west, also by Grândola, along a branch of the Sado Estuary; and northwest by the Setúbal.

Alcácer do Sal is a historical city and municipality that overlooks the Sado River; its medieval town developed from barrios that surrounded an ancient Muslim castle. Alcácer do Sal is the municipal seat, which includes two civil parishes, both having a population of 6002 residents.

The second-largest municipality (Portuguese: concelho) in the country, it is administratively subdivided into four civil parishes (Portuguese: freguesias):

- Alcácer do Sal (Santa Maria do Castelo e Santiago) e Santa Susana
- Comporta - part of the larger Comporta Coast region; although a traditional a centre of rice cultivation and fishing, the parish and villages have seen more interest recently with luxury tourism, associated with the white-sand beaches of the Sado estuary, and its proximity to the coastal beaches of the Atlantic. Its resident population is less than 1400 permanent inhabitants, although throughout the summer these numbers increase with the influx of vacationers and tourists;
- São Martinho
- Torrão - Torrão received a Manueline foral in 1512, that later disappeared. The parish, 35 kilometers from the municipal seat, was the birthplace of Bernardim Ribeiro, 15th Century poet and writer and has in the Trigo de Morais Dam one of its main tourist attractions.

A very interesting museum, documenting the occupation of the city since the Iron Age, exists under the castle, now a pousada hotel. Santa Susana includes many white-painted houses, and is the location of the municipalities principal dam, Pego do Altar, and tourist-friendly water activities and forests.

=== Climate ===
Alcácer do Sal has a Mediterranean climate (Köppen: Csa) with hot dry summers and mild wet winters.

The highest recorded temperature in the city was 46.2 °C (115.2 °F) on 4 August 2018.

Climate data for Alcácer do Sal (1991–2020), extremes (1971-present)
| Month | Jan | Feb | Mar | Apr | May | Jun | Jul | Aug | Sep | Oct | Nov | Dec | Year |
|---|---|---|---|---|---|---|---|---|---|---|---|---|---|
| Record high °C (°F) | 24.0 (75.2) | 27.0 (80.6) | 30.8 (87.4) | 36.3 (97.3) | 38.9 (102.0) | 44.9 (112.8) | 45.2 (113.4) | 46.2 (115.2) | 44.5 (112.1) | 37.6 (99.7) | 29.0 (84.2) | 24.5 (76.1) | 46.2 (115.2) |
| Mean daily maximum °C (°F) | 16.0 (60.8) | 17.5 (63.5) | 20.4 (68.7) | 22.2 (72.0) | 25.7 (78.3) | 29.4 (84.9) | 32.1 (89.8) | 32.3 (90.1) | 29.4 (84.9) | 24.9 (76.8) | 19.5 (67.1) | 16.7 (62.1) | 23.8 (74.9) |
| Daily mean °C (°F) | 10.0 (50.0) | 11.1 (52.0) | 13.8 (56.8) | 15.6 (60.1) | 18.6 (65.5) | 21.8 (71.2) | 23.9 (75.0) | 24.1 (75.4) | 21.8 (71.2) | 18.4 (65.1) | 13.6 (56.5) | 10.9 (51.6) | 17.0 (62.5) |
| Mean daily minimum °C (°F) | 3.9 (39.0) | 4.6 (40.3) | 7.1 (44.8) | 8.9 (48.0) | 11.6 (52.9) | 14.3 (57.7) | 15.7 (60.3) | 15.8 (60.4) | 14.2 (57.6) | 11.9 (53.4) | 7.7 (45.9) | 5.1 (41.2) | 10.1 (50.1) |
| Record low °C (°F) | −6.2 (20.8) | −5.6 (21.9) | −3.6 (25.5) | −1.0 (30.2) | 3.5 (38.3) | 6.4 (43.5) | 9.9 (49.8) | 9.1 (48.4) | 6.3 (43.3) | −0.5 (31.1) | −2.5 (27.5) | −4.9 (23.2) | −6.2 (20.8) |
| Average precipitation mm (inches) | 70.0 (2.76) | 48.8 (1.92) | 56.4 (2.22) | 52.4 (2.06) | 43.6 (1.72) | 10.9 (0.43) | 0.8 (0.03) | 4.1 (0.16) | 26.9 (1.06) | 73.7 (2.90) | 74.9 (2.95) | 72.6 (2.86) | 535.1 (21.07) |
| Average precipitation days (≥ 1 mm) | 8.5 | 7.2 | 7.4 | 7.5 | 6.1 | 1.8 | 0.3 | 0.9 | 3.5 | 7.6 | 8.2 | 8.4 | 67.4 |
| Average relative humidity (%) (at 9:00 UTC) | 90 | 88 | 83 | 78 | 73 | 71 | 69 | 70 | 77 | 84 | 88 | 90 | 80 |
| Mean monthly sunshine hours | 138.6 | 141.9 | 194.7 | 206.5 | 275.2 | 292.6 | 329.5 | 323.2 | 238.3 | 190.6 | 157.4 | 127.2 | 2,615.7 |
Source: Instituto Português do Mar e da Atmosfera(Average sunshine hours only recorded for 14 years: 1971-76,1978,1980-82,1988-91. Humidity 1971-2000)

== Architecture ==
=== Civic ===
- Archaeological site of Senhor dos Mártires (Portuguese: Estação Arqueológica do Senhor dos Mártires)

=== Military ===
- Castle of Alcácer do Sal (Portuguese: Castelo de Alcácer do Sal)

=== Religious ===
- Convent of Nossa Senhora de Ara Caeli (Portuguese: Convento de Nossa Senhora de Ara Caeli/Pousada de D. Afonso II)

== Sports ==
The main local sports club is Atlético Clube Alcacerense, founded in 1979.

The men's football team played in the II league of AF Setúbal. The team contested the fourth-tier Terceira Divisão from 1990 to 1996. The team also participated in the Taça de Portugal during those years.

== Notable citizens ==
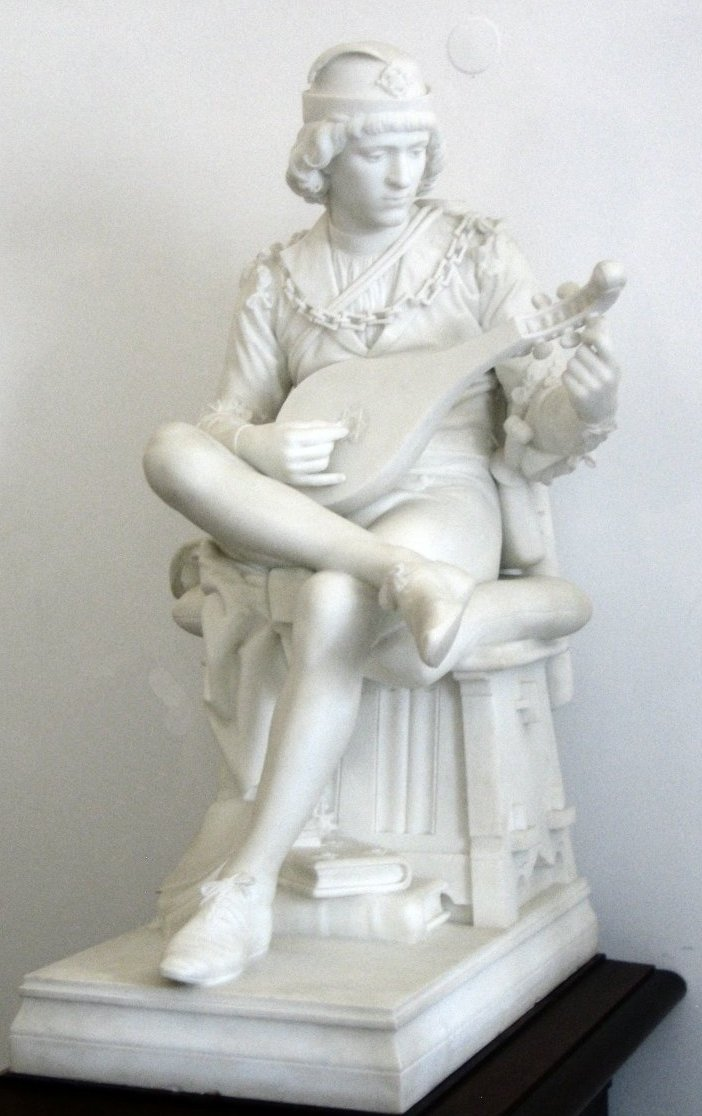
marble sculpture of Bernardim Ribeiro

- Bernardim Ribeiro (1482 in Torrão – 1552), poet and writer, wrote Livro das Saudades.
- Pedro Nunes (1502–1578), mathematician, cosmographer, and professor; best known for his contributions in the technical field of navigation
- Manuel de Brito Camacho (1862–1934), military officer, writer, publicist and politician during the Portuguese First Republic; worked in Torrão
- Francisco Gentil (1878–1964), medic, professor, and director of the Institute of Oncology in Lisbon
- Ruy Coelho (1886–1986), composer of innovative symphonies and operas
- João Branco Núncio (1901–1976) equestrian and bullfighter, known as Califa de Alcácer
- Maria Rosa Colaço (1935 in Torrão – 2004) - writer, known for A Criança e a Vida, an anthology of children's texts.
- José Mamede (born 1974) retired footballer with 292 club caps
- Filipe Brigues (born 1990) Portuguese footballer with over 250 club caps
