= Soeiro Viegas =

Roman Catholic bishop

Soeiro Viegas (died 29 January 1233), sometimes anglicized Suger, was the bishop of Lisbon from 1211 until his death. He is most notable for launching the successful siege of Alcácer do Sal in 1217. He spent eight or more years of his episcopate in Rome, where he was on behalf of King Afonso II in 1211–1212 and attending the Fourth Lateran Council in 1215–1216. He was there litigating his own troubles in 1223 and 1226–1231. The first seven years of his episcopate were characterized by good relations with the crown, but the rest of his episcopate was characterized by conflict. He was exiled from his diocese for a time in 1223–1224.

== Life ==
=== Dean of the cathedral ===
Soeiro was probably born in the second half of the 12th century. Nothing is known of his family background. He appears to have had an education in law.

In 1188, King Sancho I bequeathed a mule to the dean of Lisbon named Soeiro. This was probably Soeiro Viegas. In January 1195, he witnessed an accord between Bishop Soeiro Anes and the Order of Santiago. He appears in numerous documents as dean of the cathedral in 1198. During that year, he served seven times as a papal judge-delegate in a dispute between the diocese of Coimbra and the monastery of Santa Cruz. The first reference to him as bishop-elect is from January 1211. As he succeeded Soeiro Anes, he is sometimes known as Soeiro II.

=== Sojourns in Rome ===
Later in 1211, Soeiro was sent to Rome to litigate the late King Sancho's will. He argued on behalf of King Alfonso II against the king's sisters, Teresa and Sancha. In Rome, he was in the company of the king's other notable lawyers, Vicente Hispano and Silvestre Godinho. He remained in there throughout 1212, during which time he received episcopal consecration from Pope Innocent III. He and Vicente were instrumental in having Innocent reissue the bull Manifestis Probatum on 16 April 1212, confirming Alfonso II's right to the throne.

Soeiro attended the Fourth Lateran Council in November 1215. According to the De itinere Frisonum, there he asked Innocent for permission to employ crusaders in a planned Portuguese offensive against the Almohads, but the pope refused. Fighting in Portugal would be contrary to crusaders' vows. Soeiro remained in Rome throughout 1216, relitigating Alfonso II's dispute with his sisters, which resulted in a new bull from Innocent III in the king's favour, Cum olim charissimus, on 7 April 1216. The death of Innocent and accession of Honorius III probably necessitated the prolongation of Soeiro's stay in Rome.

=== Royal favour amidst troubles ===
Soeiro remained high in royal favour until 1218. When Queen Urraca drew up her will in 1214, she named Soeiro one of her three executors and the one entrusted with the greatest responsibility. She also left him 300 morabetinos. On 17 April 1217, in a charter praising him for his successful litigation in Rome, Alfonso II placed Soeiro and his diocese under royal protection. This protection may have been related to a series of legal difficulties afflicting Soeiro after his return from Rome. Bishop Pedro Soares of Coimbra was disputing the boundaries of some properties which he owned in the diocese of Lisbon. In a dispute with the Templars, the details of which are unknown, Soeiro excommunicated the entire order in Iberia. On 6 September 1217, Honorius announced the conclusion of an investigation into Soeiro begun under Innocent III. The bishop was cleared of wrongdoing, although the nature of the accusation and identities of the accusers are unknown.

=== Crusade ===
Soeiro may have been responsible for the placement of a palm tree at the tomb of the martyred crusader Henry of Bonn in the monastery of São Vicente de Fora, since the De itinere Frisonum reports that there was a palm there in 1217 despite the fact that the original palm had disappeared by 1188, according to the monastery's Indiculum. When a fleet of the Fifth Crusade stopped in Lisbon on 10 July 1217, it was met by Soeiro, who preached a sermon before the crusaders. Despite Innocent's refusal to sanction a crusade in Portugal, Soeiro asked the crusaders to help capture the Almohad fortress of Alcácer do Sal.

The siege of Alcácer do Sal lasted from 30 July to 18 October 1217, when the city capitulated. After the victory, Soeiro and the other leaders of the expedition wrote to the new pope, Honorius III, requesting retroactive authorization and leave to employ the crusaders for another year against the Almohads. These requests were denied. It was probably in pursuit of these goals that Soeiro commissioned Goswin of Bossut to write the De expugnatione Salaciae carmen ('Song of the Conquest of Alcácer'). The poet acknowledges Soeiro disappointment in the aftermath of the siege when he writes that "one man, and this itself is a great injustice, remained at Alcácer unrewarded and won nothing thereupon."

The initials that spell out Soeiro's name (SUERIUS) in the Carmen

=== Facing opposition ===
Soeiro faced opposition in his own cathedral over his long absence on a military campaign, especially from his dean, Vicente Hispano. Upon his return to Lisbon, he dismissed several canons and replaced them with his own appointees. Vicente was accused of uttering threats and forging documents. Soeiro wrote to the pope about the case. It is unknown how it was resolved, but by 23 May 1220 Vicente had been reinstated as dean.

In 1218, Soeiro also fell from royal favour. He was caught up on Afonso II's rivalry with the ecclesiastical hierarchy and found himself often in opposition to the king. Towards the end of 1222 or early in 1223, Soeiro travelled to Rome to present his complaints about the king to the pope. He was there when Afonso II died and was succeeded by Sancho II. In 1223, Soeiro went into exile in the kingdom of León, claiming that his life was in danger from Sancho. He was back in Lisbon in 1224.

From 1226, Soeiro was in a dispute with the monastery of São Vicente de Fora. He travelled to Rome to resolve it and remained there until 1231 or 1232, perhaps because of his poor relationship with Sancho II and with Vicente, who had become Sancho's chancellor. The Vita sancti Antonii credits him with helping put together a dossier for Anthony of Padua's canonization. He had returned to Lisbon by 22 March 1232.

== Death ==
Soeiro died on 29 January 1233. He was interred in Lisbon Cathedral, where his stone sarcophagus can still be found in the cloister chapel. It is decorated with carvings of a crozier, a cross and a palm. The latter two items would seem to indicate his status as a crusader. His epitaph, trumpeting his greatest achievement, reads, "Lord Suarius, Bishop of Lisbon, lies here, who during the reign of Afonso II conquered Alcácer do Sal from the Moors in the year 1217."

== Bibliography ==
- Bird, Jessalynn; Peters, Edward; Powell, James M., eds. (2013). Crusade and Christendom: Annotated Documents in Translation from Innocent III to the Fall of Acre, 1187–1291. University of Pennsylvania Press.
- Branco, Maria João Violante (1998). "Reis, bispos e cabidos: a diocese de Lisboa durante o primeiro século da sua restauração" (PDF). Lusitania sacra. 2nd series. 10: 55–94.
- Van Cleve, Thomas C. (1969). "The Fifth Crusade". In Kenneth M. Setton; Robert Lee Wolff; Harry Hazard (eds.). A History of the Crusades. Vol. II: The Later Crusades, 1189–1311. University of Wisconsin Press. pp. 377–428.
- Wilson, Jonathan; Branco, Maria João (2018). "Soeiro Viegas (1211–1233)". In João Luís Inglês Fontes (ed.). Bispos e Arcebispos de Lisboa. Livros Horizonte. pp. 151–165.
- Wilson, Jonathan, ed. (2021). The Conquest of Santarém and Goswin's Song of the Conquest of Alcácer do Sal: Editions and Translations of De expugnatione Scalabis and Gosuini de expugnatione Salaciae carmen. Crusade Texts in Translation. Routledge.
