= Chronicle of the King D. Pedro I =

Chronicle

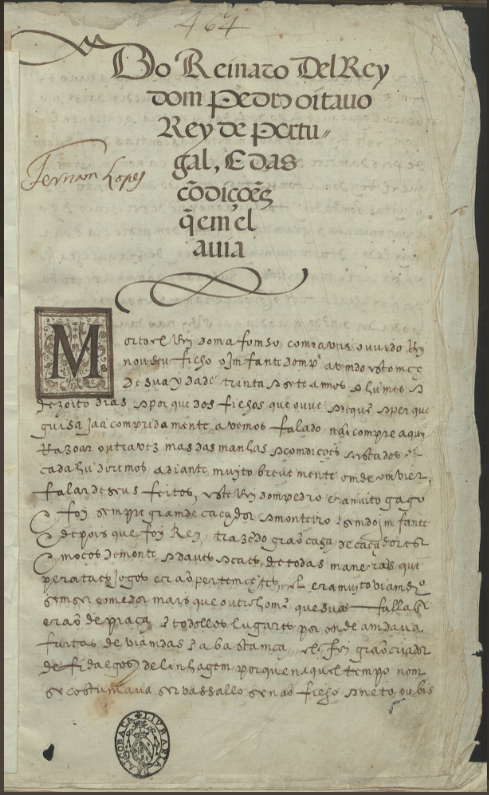
- First page of the Chronicle of the King D. Pedro I and D. João I; manuscript of c. 1525 – 1575
- Author: Fernão Lopes
- Language: Archaic Portuguese
- Genre: Chronicle
- Publication place: Portugal

The Chronicle of the King D. Pedro I, or Chronicle of D. Pedro, is a historical record of the chronicle genre written by Fernão Lopes covering the period of time corresponding to the reign of D. Pedro I of Portugal, known as the Just, or the Cruel, which took place between 1357 and 1367.

The Chronicle of D. Pedro I is divided into forty-four chapters and begins with a Prologue. Of the many subjects treated throughout the Chronicle, the most noteworthy are Justice, to which he dedicates the Prologue and six chapters, the organization of the State and the king's decisions, Inês de Castro, to which he dedicates six chapters, reporting in particular Pedro's declaration about his marriage to Inês, the persecution of her murderers and the description of the transfer of Inês' mortal remains from Coimbra to Alcobaça, a chapter dedicated to D. João I, the bastard son of D. João I, the bastard son of D. Pedro I. João I, bastard son of D. Pedro and future king, and also the Kingdom of Castile to which he dedicates sixteen of the chapters, in this case dealing with decisions or undertakings of King Pedro I of Castile, nephew of the homonymous Portuguese king, and for whose history Fernão Lopes must have had access to the Chronicles about the same time of the Castilian chronicler Pedro López de Ayala.

Fernão Lopes, who began by having the profession of notary, was in 1418 appointed keeper of the Torre do Tombo, i.e., head of the state archives, a position of trust of the court, and which allowed him access to important documentation for the preparation of his Chronicles. Fernão Lopes probably starts writing the Chronicle of D. Pedro in 1434 because it was in this year that King D. Duarte awarded him for his future work the annual tença of fourteen thousand reals.

It is the first of the three great chronicles of the precursor of Portuguese history, and also the first royal chronicle with characteristics close to those that defined the genre cultivated in the fifteenth century and in the two following, being the other two chronicles of Fernão Lopes the Chronicle of D. Fernando and the Chronicle of D. João I.

"And the people said that there had never been such ten years in Portugal as these when the King D. Pedro reigned." Ending of Chronicle of the King D. Pedro I.

== Summary ==
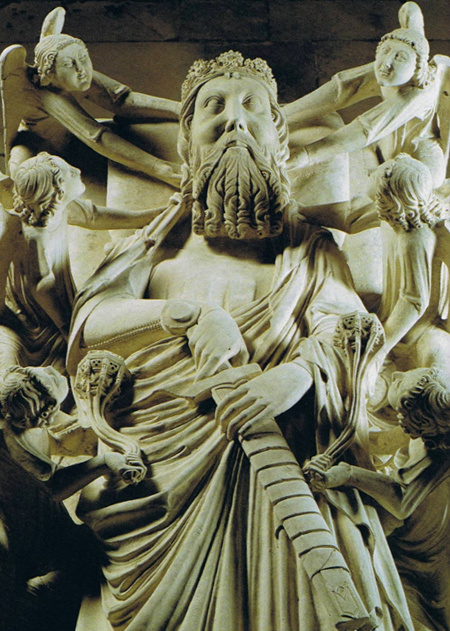
A lying statue of D. Pedro in his tomb in the Alcobaça Monastery

Among the subjects covered by Fernão Lopes in this Chronicle are Justice, to which he dedicated the Prologue and six chapters, the organization of the State and the king's decisions, Inês de Castro, to whom he dedicated six chapters, relating in particular the public declaration of D. Pedro about his marriage to Inês, the persecution of her murderers and the transfer of her remains from Coimbra to Alcobaça, D. João I, father of D. Duarte, to whom Fernão Lopes had entrusted the preparation of the Chronicle and to whom he would certainly be very pleased with his father's panegyric. Duarte, who had entrusted Fernão Lopes with the preparation of the Chronicle and who would certainly enjoy the panegyric of his father, to whom he dedicated chapter 43, and also the Kingdom of Castile, to which he dedicated sixteen chapters, in this case dealing with decisions or undertakings of King Pedro I of Castile, nephew of Pedro I of Portugal, and for whose history Fernão Lopes must have had access to the Chronicles of the same time by the Castilian chronicler Pedro López de Ayala.

=== Justice ===
Fernão Lopes wanted to give D. Pedro the image of a king concerned with Justice, which is why he received the nickname Justiceiro (Justice), or also Cruel, in this case also because of the type of punishments sentenced, as can be read in the Prologue and in six of the forty-four chapters of the Chronicle where he describes specific cases of application of justice.

About the importance of justice in governing the kingdom, Fernão Lopes writes in the Prologue

Justice is a virtue that is called every virtue, so that anyone who is just, this one fulfills every virtue, because justice, as well as the law of God, holds that you do not fornicate or be a gargantuan, and by keeping this, the virtue of chastity and temperance is fulfilled. And so you can understand about the other vices and virtues. This virtue is very necessary for the king and also for his subjects, because if the king has the virtue of justice, he will make laws so that all may live straight and in peace. And his subjects, being just, will obey the laws he lays down, and in obeying them they will not do anything unjust against anyone, and such virtue as this everyone can gain by the work of good understanding.

Regarding the notion of justice as "virtue that is all virtue", it is possible that Fernão Lopes knew Aristotle's texts, since he, in the Nicomachaean Ethics, quotes a Greek proverb with an idea very close to the one referred by Fernão Lopes: "Justice contains all other virtues".

In the five chapters dealing with specific cases of justice, chapters 6 to 10, one describes the theft and murder of a Jew (ch. 6), and the remaining four are cases of adultery. In two of the five cases mentioned, the case of a bishop (high clergy, ch. 7) and another of the admiral of the realm (high nobility, ch. 10), the punishments initially decided by the king were ultimately not applied in the face of requests for clemency by influential people.

=== The State ===
To Fernão Lopes, the State was established by men to accomplish the public good. It was not established to carry out any divine order on earth, nor to be the secular arm of the Church, as argued by Augustinian Luther, his conception of the State being close to the much later doctrine of the social contract.

=== Inês de Castro ===
Another of the themes that the Chronicle highlights is the set of events related to Inês de Castro. When Pedro ascends to the throne Inês de Castro had already been murdered, and the Chronicle relates first in chapters 27 to 29 how Pedro officially declared that he had betrothed her in an incognito manner, with witnesses, so that she could be recognized as queen.

Then, in chapters 29 to 31, it is told how Pedro agrees with his counterpart from Castile to exchange fugitives from both kingdoms, among whom, on the Portuguese side, are the three assassins of Inês de Castro. Of these three, two are deported to Portugal and are tortured, and one, Diogo Lopes Pacheco, manages to escape to France.

Finally, in chapter 44, it is related how D. Pedro had the remains of Inês de Castro transferred in a pompous ceremony to the Alcobaça Monastery and how he had two marble tombs richly decorated with the lying statues of each, one for Inês de Castro and the other for her own body to be laid in the future, as happened.

Medieval literature is full of love couples. The loves of Amadis de Gaula and Oriana are probably the most conventional, inspired by those of Lancelot and Queen Guinevere, which their antecedents in those of Tristan and Iseult, whose passion became known as the archetype of romantic love, proper to the West.

But Fernão Lopes, referring also to the loves of "Queen Dido" (immortalized by Virgil in the Aeneid and known through medieval adaptations, such as the Roman d'Eneas, one of the sources of the First General Chronicle of Alfonso X) and of "Adriana" (Ariadne), popularized by Ovid, and commenting that they are "composite loves, which some authors rich in eloquence and flourishing in dictation have ordered as they saw fit", describes what happened between D. Pedro and Inês de Castro and says that he is the author of the love affair. Pedro and Inês de Castro and says that their loves are not feigned, and "are told and read in the stories that have their foundation on truth", that is, in the narratives of cases that happened, as were (or were supposed to be) the chronicles.

The chronicler narrates how the transfer of Inês de Castro's mortal remains took place:

And remembering to honor her bones, because he couldn't do more, he ordered a mourning of white stone, all very subtly made, with her image raised on the upper grave, with a crown on her head, as if she were queen; and this mourning he ordered to be placed in the Alcobaça Monastery, not at the entrance where the kings lie, but inside the church, on the right hand side, next to the main chapel.

And he had his body brought from the Monastery of Santa Clara-a-Velha, where he was lying, in the most honorable way possible, because he came on stilts very well arranged for such a time, with great horsemen, accompanied by great noblemen and many other people, and ladies and maidens and clergy. On the way there were many men with tapers in their hands, in such a way arranged, that their bodies always went all the way through lighted tapers, and thus they arrived at the said monastery, which was seventeen leagues away, where with many masses and great solemnity that muiment was placed. And this was the most honorable transference that until that time had been seen in Portugal.

Similarly, the king ordered another beautiful and well-designed mural to be made for himself, and he had it placed next to his own, so that when he died they could lay it on him.

=== D. João I ===
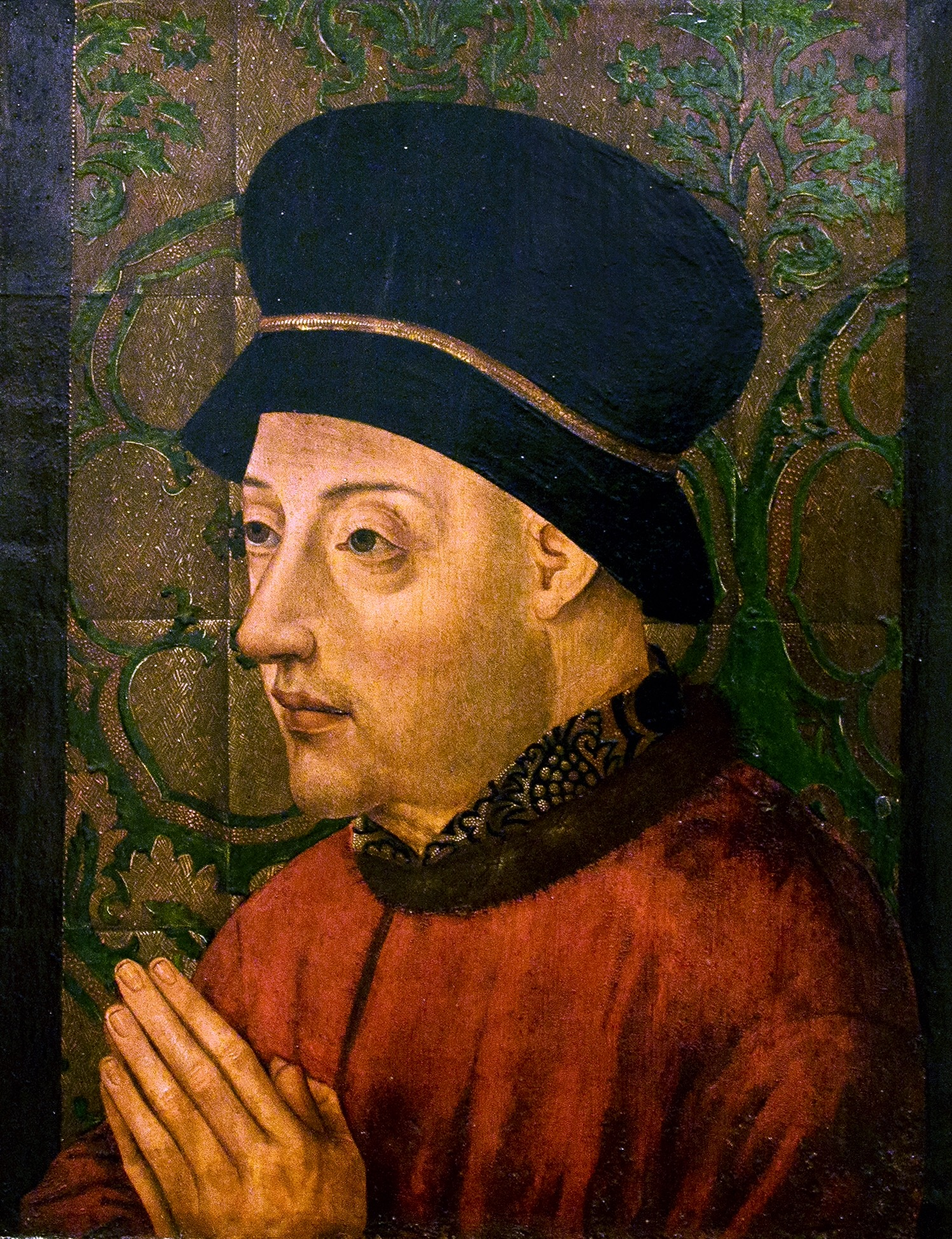
Portrait of D. João I, work by an unknown author from the 15th century, at the National Museum of Ancient Art

The fact that D. Pedro was the father of D. João I, whose memory D. Duarte had specially recommended that Fernão Lopes celebrate. Duarte had especially recommended Fernão Lopes to celebrate when he commissioned him to write the histories of all the kings, contributed to the care with which the chronicler treated the figure of this future monarch and sought to clarify historical aspects of his life that had so much influence on later history. The emphasis given to the dream in which D. Pedro sees the future Master of Avis symbolically saving Portugal (chapter 43) must have this explanation.

In this aspect, that of the praise of a character through a premonitory dream, the Chronicle of D. Pedro is similar to the Chronicle of D. João I. While in the latter (chapter 33) is Álvaro Gonçalves Pereira, prior of the Sovereign Military Order of Malta, in doubt as to which of his sons, Pedro Álvares or Nuno Álvares, would be the protagonist of a prophecy of a future of great battles and victories, in the Chronicle of Dom Pedro (chapter 43) is the king himself, Dom Pedro I, about his son John. Pedro I himself, about his son João, confirming his choice as Master of the Order of Avis, in the famous dream "in which I saw all of Portugal burning with fire, so that the whole kingdom looked like a bonfire; and being so amazed at such a thing, my son João came with a stick in his hand, and with it he put out all that fire", predicting a future reign of justice, just as Pedro himself had done.

D. João I appears in the title of chapter 43 while D. Fernando, also son and immediate successor of Pedro, was not entitled to appear in such a prominent place, although he is mentioned throughout the Chronicle, especially when his marriage to the princess Beatriz of Castile was being negotiated.

=== Kingdom of Castile ===
In sixteen of the forty-four chapters of this Chronicle, i.e. in chapters 13, 16, 17, 18, 19, 20, 21, 22, 23, 26, 32, 33, 34, 35, 36 and 40, Fernão Lopes narrates events pertaining exclusively to the history of the Kingdom of Castile, or the relations or war of this kingdom with other kingdoms than Portugal, dealing in most cases with decisions or undertakings of King Pedro I of Castile. Although this king of Castile is the nephew of Pedro I of Portugal, the space given to this theme seems exaggerated, but it will be understood by the access that Fernão Lopes had to the Chronicles of the same time of the Castilian Pedro López de Ayala and the use he made of them in his texts.

== Completeness of the historical record of the Chronicle ==
In order to appreciate the breadth of the historical record of the Crónica de D. Pedro in relation to the period it described, the most important events that occurred during the reign of Dom Pedro, according to Joel Serrão's chronological choice, are listed below, and the chapters of the Crónica de D. Pedro that deal with them are indicated. The remaining chapters of this Chronicle deal predominantly with events that occurred in Castile and other kingdoms, and also with the actions of the main Portuguese nobles, including members of the royal family:

Date	Main Historic Facts	Chapters of the Chronicle	Other
1357	D. Afonso IV Dies; D. Pedro ascends to the throne	1	
1357	D. Pedro chastises his father's advisors who orchestrated Inês de Castro's death	30 and 31	
1357	First charter of privileges granted to Genoese in Portugal.		
1358	Courts of Santarem.		
1358	Treaty of Alliance between D. Pedro I and king D. Pedro (also the Cruel), of Castile. D. João I is born.	15 and 1	
1359	Solemn declaration of D. Pedro, made in Cantanhede, that he had married D. Inês de Castro. The corpse of D. Inês de Castro is transferred to Alcobaça.	27, 28, 29 and 44	
1360	D. Nuno Álvares Pereira is born		
1361	Cortes de Elvas. The people complain again in courts against the illicit increase of Church properties.	4 and 5	The Chronicle does not refer to these Cortes explicitly, although it copies their determinations
1361	Royal Beneplacite. Plague epidemic. Pope Innocent VI's letter, Nuper per certos, refusing Dom Pedro's request for legitimacy for the children born from D. Inês.		
1362	Sines is elevated to a village		
1364	Cascais becomes a town. Braga Synod held in Pombeiro.		
1365	Plague in Portugal.		
1366	Treaty of alliance between Dom Pedro and Henry II of Castile.	41	
367	Death of D. Pedro I. Beginning of D. Fernando's reign.	44	

=== Style ===
According to Teresa Amado, "having followed in the writing of the chronicles the respective chronological order, it was with this one that the chronicler began to practice more effectively his original way of telling and structuring the narrative, because of the previous reigns there were drafts of chronic texts in the vast trecentist compilations, and the limitations of the information that there was on them were, on the other hand, closely constraining".

In António José Saraiva's words, "The prose of Fernão Lopes retains the "spoken" tone of the chivalric romances, but enriched with a vocabulary and images revealing a great sense of concrete, and with the resources of the clerical oratory, opportunely touched by a chill of biblical solemnity, as when he speaks of the "good and gentle Portuguese olive tree". The tone in which he speaks is always full of emotion, which does not exclude irony, as can be seen in the extraordinary description of the siege of Lisbon. The popular sayings, the anecdotes, and the majesty of tone appropriate to great moments succeed each other with perfect naturalness, without letting one perceive the rhetorical technicality of the time, which, by the way, he mastered perfectly. And a powerful patriarchal voice, sometimes thunderous with indignation, sometimes solemn, sometimes bantering, but always warm and long-winded, seems to come out of his words."

=== Method ===
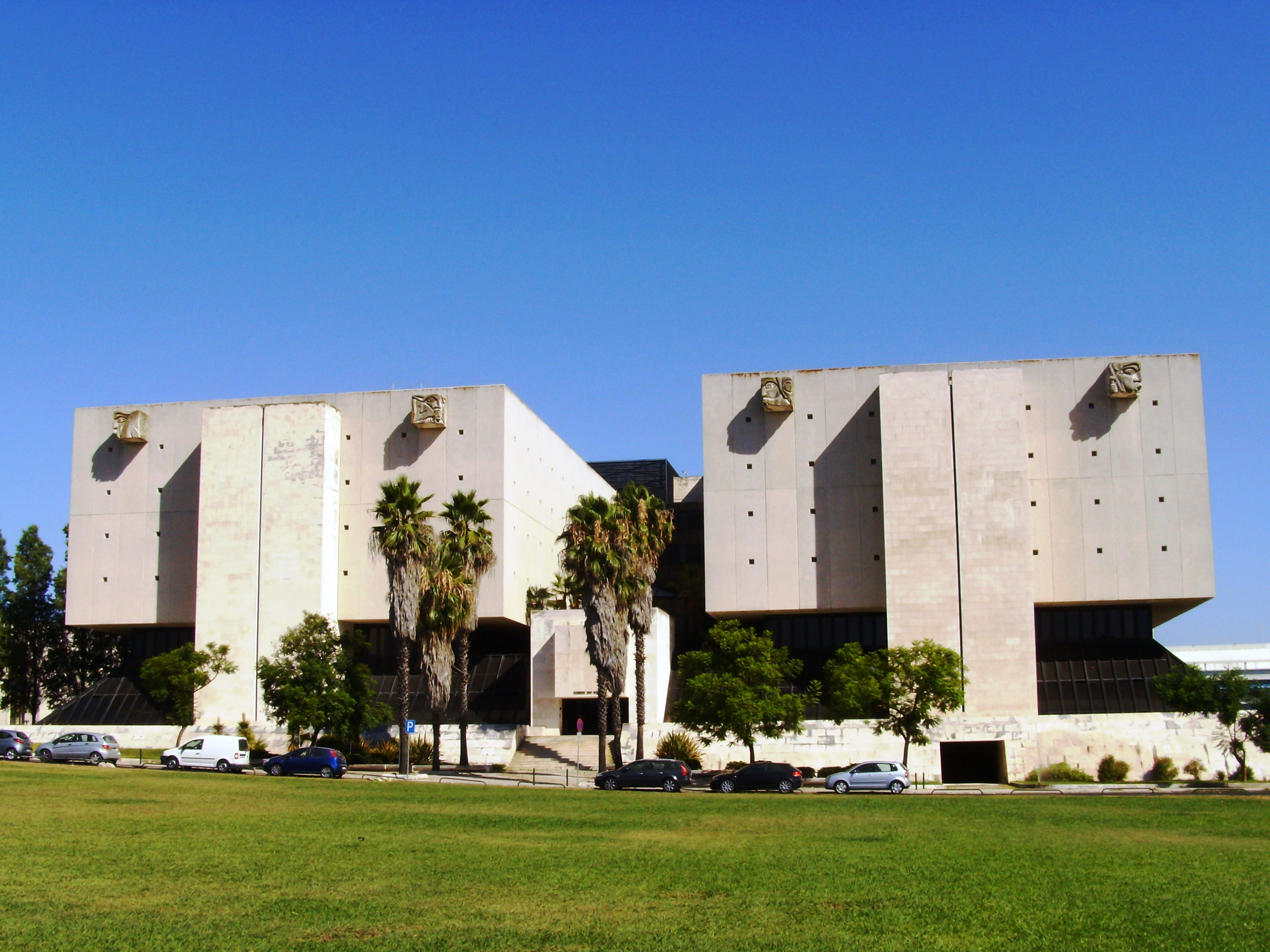
Modern Torre do Tombo, Lisbon, named after the original Torre do Tombo in the São Jorge Castle

From the reign of D. Pedro there would be few written narratives to which Fernão Lopes could turn, judging by the materials he shows to have taken advantage of. For the description of the laws and administrative practices that this sovereign decreed and applied, and for certain statements of his thoughts in this field, the documents he used were The Books of D. Pedro's Chancellery and the Minutes of the 1361 Cortes de Elvas, from which he extracted passages whose content he faithfully reproduced (chapters 4 to 6).

For the accounts of the sentences handed down to various characters guilty of crimes, he must have resorted to news of royal sentences recorded in archives to which he naturally had access, and also to the traditional concept formed about this just, but excessively impulsive king capable of manifestations of genuine cruelty (chapters 6 to 9). Everything indicates that other revelations had the same origin, such as his stammering, his taste for hunting and good food, and his way of counteracting insomnia by having music played and calling people to dance with him in the street.

Fernão Lopes wrote the Chronicle with the spirit of a notary, for whom true and false are confirmed documentally. He sought out the authentic documents, exploring the Torre do Tombo that he was responsible for. In the Chronicle of Dom Pedro, and also in those of Dom Fernando and Dom João I, this use of original documents is a constant, and it can be said that the chronicler only refers to an event if he has the corresponding document or another previous Chronicle whose authenticity he trusted, often reproducing, without even stating it, those texts. It can be said that he conceived history as a documentally instructed process.

=== Context ===
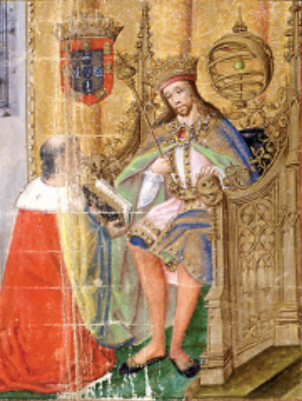
D. Duarte on the throne (c. 1497 – 1504), illumination from the Chronica del rey d. Duarte by Rui de Pina.

Fernão Lopes, who started out as a notary public, was appointed keeper of the Torre do Tombo in 1418, i.e., head of the state archives, a position of trust at court, which allowed him access to important documentation for the preparation of his Chronicles. He received from D. Duarte the task of writing the history of the kings of Portugal in 1434 and the title of "vassal of the King", a letter of nobility granted to members of the non-noble classes.

Duarte's reign, which was a short one, from 1433 to 1438, was a period in which the nobility were clearly favored by the king. In their favor, the Royal Council, a true council of ministers, was remodeled, and the currency was valued.

But it is also the time when the Cortes of Évora, meeting in April 1436, despite the initial opposition of Duarte and the disapproval of Pedro, but by strong insistence of D. Henrique, decides to conquer the Moroccan city of Tangier, and an armada was sent the following year, in 1437, to try to conquer the city, which resulted in disaster for the Portuguese army.

This military disaster hits Fernão Lopes hard because in Morocco in captivity had to die his son Martinho and the infante D. Fernando who was close advisor (clerk of the purity).

=== Critical appraisal ===
According to Magalhães Basto, after being mentioned by Gomes Eanes de Zurara (1410–1474) in the prologue of his Chronicle of King John I (1450), Fernão Lopes will only be remembered again in the second half of the 16th century when the historian and humanist Damião de Góis (1502–1574) accused Rui de Pina (1440–1552), Zurara's successor, of having plagiarized the Chronicles of Fernão Lopes. Thus, for about a century, Fernão Lopes was forgotten, but from the nineteenth century, especially after Alexandre Herculano (1810–1877) in Opúsculos have classified him as the "father of Portuguese history" the literary criticism and Portuguese historians in general, enshrined him as the great Portuguese chronicler.

For Marcela Guimarães, Fernão Lopes recorded the dynastic succession that launched the expansion but did not report it, which would be done by whoever succeeded him in office, presenting the expansion as a new crusade, even if using texts by Fernão Lopes. Fernão Lopes' task was to historize, to make a "total history", which resulted in the famous trilogy - the Chronicle of D. Pedro, the Chronicle of D. Fernando and the Chronicle of D. João I. As the voice of the recently established dynasty, Fernão Lopes tells the story of the founder of the new era of his country and of humanity, a memorable fact in itself, but also taking an interest in life in general and in human misery, cruelty, foolishness and hesitation.

Also for Marcela Guimarães, Fernão Lopes, having been the "vanguard" of Portuguese prose of his time, may have been dragged by a current he tried to resist, the current of a new mentality concerning the balance of power between the various social classes, with representations of power different from those expressed and implied in his texts, which may have led to the loss of his official position.

Still for Marcela Guimarães, the Iberian chroniclers developed their texts through the combination of four aspects, which can be considered the backbone of this genre of historical record in Hispanic lands, since the work of Eusebius of Caesarea, through the Visigothic chronicles of John of Biclaro and Isidore of Seville. These aspects are the chronology, the flat style, the universalism and the providentialist vision. Both the flat style and the universalism underwent major changes in the Chronicles of Fernão Lopes. If the first aspect corresponds to the lack of literary concern, of involvement of the chronicler with the text, of coherence and originality, in the Chronicles of Fernão Lopes only there is no concern to expose novelties, there is a deep concern with the unit, and although he does not want to be praised for the style, he is concerned with it, refines the narrative and composes pictures of a touching literary quality. In relation to universalism, his Chronicles follow the general trend of regionalization, if not provincialism, and even personalism, as with many of the late Iberian Chronicles, because the Chronicles of Fernão Lopes focuses on very specific realities, the transition from the first to the second dynasty in Portugal.

In short, for Marcela Guimarães, the Crónica de D. Pedro de Fernão Lopes is the most important narrative source for the analysis of the figure and the reign of D. Pedro, describing a particular way of governing that that time demanded, or conditioned, or as Fernão Lopes understood it to have happened.

The political map of the Iberian Peninsula in 1400, in an intermediate period between the reign of D. Pedro and the writing of the Chronicle of D. Pedro

For Nei Nordin, for the immense historical and literary value of his works, for his work methodology and style, Fernão Lopes was often recognized as the first historian of Portugal, even if this primacy is currently attributed to Count D. Pedro de Barcelos. There is no doubt that three chronicles are proven to have been created by Fernão Lopes, the first being the Crónica de D. Pedro. A medieval chronicler par excellence, but also a humanist of a Renaissance spirit that is announcing itself in Portugal, his work expresses tendencies of this cultural multiplicity.

Nordin goes on to say that, in a broader context, one can perceive the Lopean narrative organized into three demarcated stages: the time of plenty and stability with Pedro I, the time of decadence with Fernando I, and the time of redemption with João I. The chronicler established a mythical sequence of the Portuguese nation on its way to affirmation. And to demonstrate the stability of Pedro's government, the Crónica de D. Pedro devotes many chapters to the problem of war, first the war of Castile against Aragon and then the war between Pedro and Henry of Trastâmara for the crown of Castile.

Still for Nordin, Fernão Lopes' writings become an apology for authority and the good use of justice and sometimes allow us to understand the complexity of administration, documents being his raw material, as a notary, archivist and chronicler. The characteristic traits of Fernão Lopes' chronological production point to a refined sense, literary resourcefulness, and use of narrative resources, placing him within the trends of the literature of his time, although it would be hasty to classify him as an avant-garde man or a forerunner of an era, but one who stood out with a remarkable prose that would fascinate readers for centuries to come.

Also for Nordin, in analyzing the work of Fernão Lopes, it is necessary to emphasize his social origin, distinct from previous cases of chroniclers such as Count Pedro de Barcelos or the Castilian Pero Lopez Ayala, for having been nobleman he shared the worldview of the group of officials of the nascent states whose structure was becoming more complex. But Fernão Lopes always worked to attest the legitimacy of the monarchs he biographed, as he did in the Crónica de D. Pedro.

Nordin also points out that in the numerous narrative instruments employed, Fernão Lopes also uses the artifice of prophecy and predestination which, being recurrent in medieval literature, Fernão Lopes places in D. Pedro's vision of his son João who was to be king.

=== Publications ===
There are more than forty manuscripts (some incomplete) of the Crónica, most of them from the 16th century, with the oldest dating from the early 16th century or perhaps the last years of the previous one, and a smaller number from the 17th century. It was first printed in 1735 in Lisbon.

More recent editions:

- Fernão Lopes, Crónicas; Editor: Campo das Letras; ISBN 9789896252380, EAN 9789896252380; Páginas: 456
- Fernão Lopes, Crónicas; Editor: Verbo; Edição/reimpressão: 2009; ISBN 9789722229081; Páginas: 304
- Fernão Lopes, Crónica de D. Pedro (2.ª edição revista); Editor: INCM – Imprensa Nacional Casa da Moeda; Edição/reimpressão:2007; ISBN 9789722712538; Páginas: 23
