= Rui de Pina =

Portuguese chronicler (1440–1522)

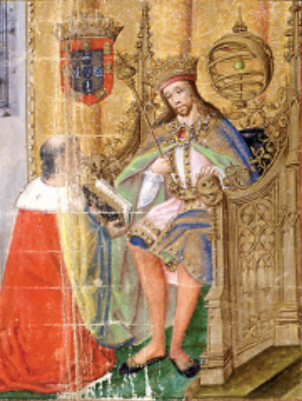
- Rui de Pina presents King Manuel I with his Chronicle of King Edward, c. 1497-1504.

Chief Chronicler of the Kingdom of Portugal
- In office 1497–1522
- Monarch: Manuel I of Portugal
- Preceded by: Vasco Fernandes de Lucena
- Succeeded by: Fernão de Pina

Personal details
- Born: 1440 Guarda, Portugal
- Died: 1522 (aged 81–82) Lisbon, Portugal

Rui (or Ruy) de Pina (1440–1522) was a Portuguese chronicler.

== Biography ==
Rui (or Ruy) de Pina was a native of Guarda. He acted as secretary of the embassy sent by King John II of Portugal to Castile in the spring of 1482, and in the following September returned there as sole envoy. He was present at the execution of Fernando II, Duke of Braganza at Évora in 1483, and in 1484 went to Rome as secretary of an embassy to Pope Innocent VIII. Upon his return, the king charged him to write a history of his reign and gave him a pension for his support.

Following the return of Christopher Columbus from his first voyage in 1493, Pina was one of the commissaries dispatched to Barcelona by John II to negotiate with the Catholic sovereigns respecting the limits of their respective jurisdictions, that would culminate in the Treaty of Tordesillas in 1494. In September 1495 he attested the will of John II in his capacity as a notary public, and on 25 October of the same year he was present at his master's death at Alvor and opened and read his testament.

The new king, Manuel I, confirmed his pension and in 1497 appointed him high chronicler (cronista-mor) of the kingdom, keeper of the archives of Torre do Tombo and royal librarian, with a suitable salary. By 1504 Rui de Pina had completed his chronicles of Afonso V and John II. In 1521, King John III charged him with a history of his father, Manuel, and at his death Pina had carried it down to the capture of Azamor, as we know from Damião de Góis, who used it in preparing his own chronicle of that monarch.

== Chronicles ==
It is probable that the Chronicles of the First Seven Kings of Portugal from Sancho I to Afonso IV which were published under Pina's name in the 18th century were written by Fernão Lopes and edited by Pina, while that of King Duarte seems to have been the joint production of Lopes and Gomes Eanes de Zurara, with Pina again as the editor only.

Pina was a favourite of fortune during his life, for, apart from royal benefactions, he received presents from public men who wished to figure well in his books, and after his death he obtained the credit for work that was not his. His authority as an historian is considerable, and his frankness is said to have provoked remark from contemporaries.

Pinas' chronicle of King AFonso IV was first published in Lisbon in 1853; those of King Duarte and King Afonso V in vol. i of the Colecção de livros inéditos da historia portugueza (Lisbon, 1790), and his chronicle of John II in vol. ii of the same collection (Lisbon, 1792).

Ruy de Pina was immensely influential in his day. Afonso de Albuquerque, governor of Portuguese India, is said to have sent a set of jewels to Ruy de Pina, in an effort to ensure that he would not be overlooked in his chronicles. The introduction to the chronicle of King Duarte contains the fullest account of Pinas' life.

== List of works ==
Royal Chronicles: (by chronological order of reigns):

- Afonso I (1139–1185) - skipped by Rui de Pina, done by Duarte Galvão.
- Sancho I (1185–1211) - Chronica do muito alto e muito esclarecido principe D. Sancho I, Segundo Rey de Portugal, first published 1727, Miguel Lopes Ferreira editor, Lisbon, Ferreyriana. online
- Afonso II (1211–1223) - Chronica do muito alto e muito esclarecido principe D. Afonso II, Terceiro Rey de Portugal, first published 1727, Miguel Lopes Ferreira editor, Lisbon, Ferreyriana online
- Sancho II (1223–1248) - Chronica do muito alto e muito esclarecido principe D. Sancho II, Quarto Rey de Portugal, first published 1728, Miguel Lopes Ferreira editor, Lisbon, Ferreyriana. online
- Afonso III (1248–1279) - Chronica do muito alto e muito esclarecido principe D. Afonso III, Quinto Rey de Portugal, first published 1728, Miguel Lopes Ferreira editor, Lisbon, Ferreyriana. online*
- Denis (1279–1325) - Chronica do muito alto e muito esclarecido principe D. Diniz, Sexto Rey de Portugal, first published 1729, Miguel Lopes Ferreira editor, Lisbon, Ferreyriana. online
- Afonso IV (1325–1357) - Chronica de el rey Dom Afonso o Quarto do nome: e Setimo dos Reys de Portugal, assi como a deixou escrita Ruy de Pina, Guardador da Torre do Tombo & Chronista mór do mesmo Reyno, first published 1653, Pedro de Maris, editor, Lisbon: Paulo Craesbeek. online
- Peter I (1357–1367) - skipped by Rui de Pina, done by Fernão Lopes
- Ferdinand I (1357–1367) - skipped by Rui de Pina, done by Fernão Lopes
- John I (1385–1433) - skipped by Rui de Pina, done by Fernão Lopes up to 1411, by Gomes Eanes de Zurara from 1412.
- Edward (1433–1438) - "Chronica d'el Rey D. Duarte", first published 1790 in J.F. Correia da Serra, editor, Collecção de livros ineditos de historia portugueza. Lisbon: Academia das Ciências de Lisboa, Vol. 1. (Repr. in 1901 edition, Gabriel Pereira, editor, Lisbon: Escriptorio, online)
- Afonso V (1438-14781) - "Chronica d'el Rey D. Affonso V", first published 1790 in J.F. Correia da Serra, editor, Collecção de livros ineditos de historia portugueza. Lisbon: Academia das Ciências de Lisboa, Vol. 1. (Repr. in 1901 edition, 3 vols, Gabriel Pereira, editor, Lisbon: Escriptorio, online)
- John II (1481–1495) - "Chronica d'el Rey D. João II", first published 1792 in J.F. Correia da Serra, editor, Collecção de livros ineditos de historia portugueza. Lisbon: Academia das Ciências de Lisboa, Vol. 2.
- Manuel I (1495–1521) - begun by Ruy de Pina, left incomplete, done by Damião de Góis
