= Fernão Lopes =

Portuguese chronicler

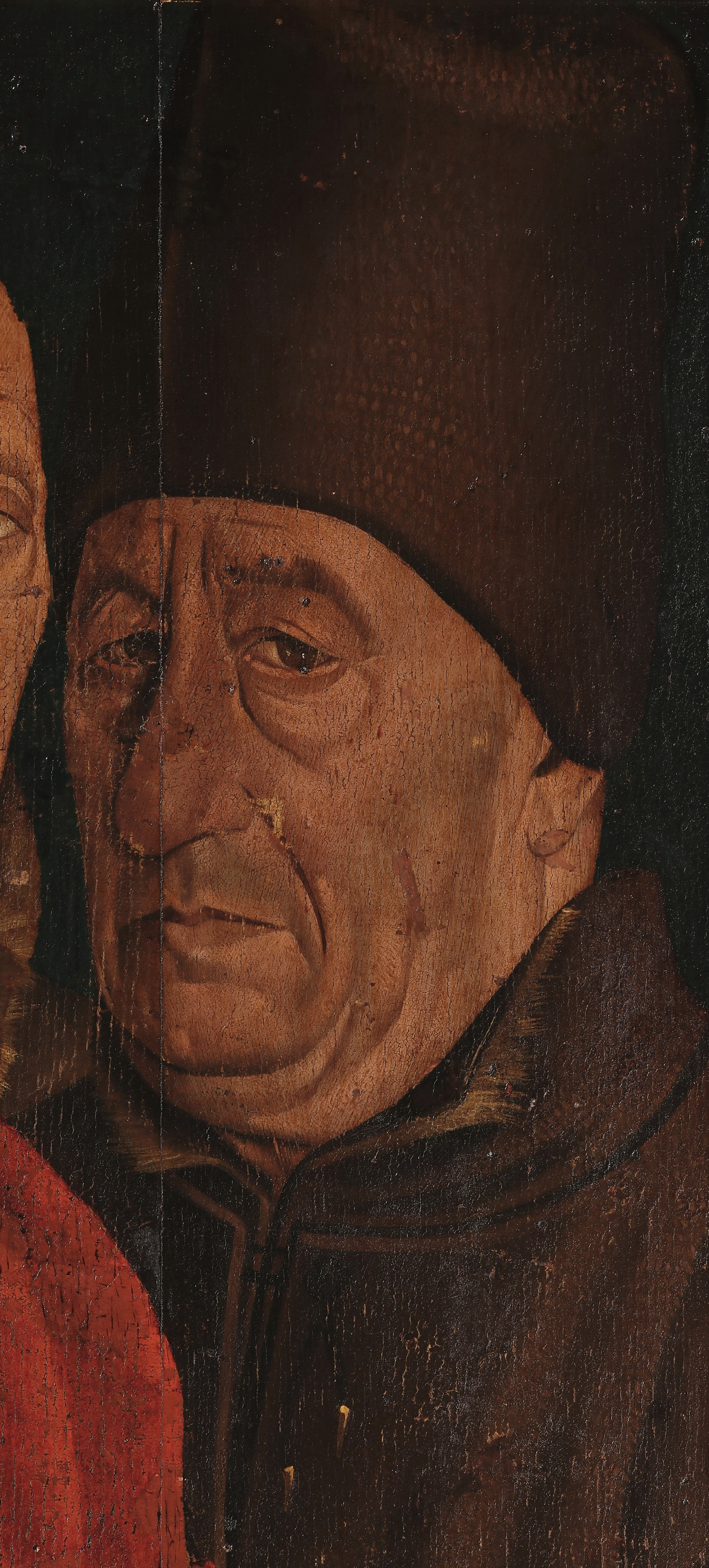
- Supposed portrait of Fernão Lopes, from Nuno Gonçalves's Saint Vincent Panels.

Chief Chronicler of the Kingdom of Portugal
- In office 19 March 1434 – 1448
- Monarch: Edward I of Portugal
- Preceded by: None (position established)
- Succeeded by: Gomes Eanes de Zurara

High Guardian of the Royal Archives
- In office c. 1418 – 6 June 1454
- Monarch: Edward I of Portugal
- Preceded by: Gonçalo Gonçalves
- Succeeded by: Gomes Eanes de Zurara

Personal details
- Born: c. 1385 Alandroal?, Kingdom of Portugal
- Died: c. 1460 (aged 74–75) Alandroal?, Kingdom of Portugal

Fernão Lopes (Portuguese pronunciation: [fɨɾˈnɐ̃w ˈlɔpɨʃ]; c. 1385 – after 1459) was a Portuguese chronicler appointed by King Edward of Portugal. Fernão Lopes wrote the history of Portugal, but only a part of his work remained.

His way of writing was based on oral discourse, and, on every page, it revealed his roots among the common people. He is one of the fathers of the European historiography, or a precursor of the scientific historiography, basing his works always on the documental proof, and, as he said, on his pages "one cannot find the beauty of words but the nudity of the truth." He was an autodidact. By the time of his death, a new kind of knowledge was arising, a Latinized scholasticism that involved imitations of the classics.

== Life ==
It is assumed that he was born between the years 1380 and 1390, with a probable villeinous family background. There is a chance that he was born and later buried in Alandroal, in Alentejo, based on the inscription of a tombstone, which may have belonged to him, and on the historical links between the village and the Order of Avis.

He belonged to the generation that came of age after the war with Castile and the Battle of Aljubarrota. During his life, he knew many of the protagonists of the Castilian crisis, including John I of Portugal, Edward of Portugal, Nuno Álvares Pereira, and Dr. João das Regras. He saw the reign of three monarchs: John I, Edward I, and Afonso V, and he also lived during the regency of Peter, Duke of Coimbra.

Portugal saw many social and political changes in his time, such as: the growth of the new nobility of the 'Illustrious Generation' (Ínclita Geração) (the children of John I and Philippa of Lancaster); the conquest of Ceuta; the insurrection of Lisbon against the Queen Mother, Leonor of Aragon; the election of Pedro, Duke of Coimbra, to the regency; a civil war between Pedro and Afonso V; and the subsequent Battle of Alfarrobeira, where Pedro died. At the end of his life, Lopes witnessed the beginning of Portugal's maritime empire.

In 1418, Fernão Lopes was appointed by John I as the head (guardião-mor) of the royal archives ('Torre do Tombo'). In 1434, King Edward appointed Fernão Lopes as the first royal chronicler (cronista-mor) of the realm, and commissioned him to write historical accounts of the reigns of the Kings of Portugal. Lopes threw himself into the task. Fernão Lopes is acknowledged as the author of at least three chronicles: of the reign of king Peter I (r.1357-1367), of the reign of Ferdinand I (r.1367-1385) and the first two parts of the reign of John I (1385 up to year 1412, his successor Gomes Eanes de Zurara would produce the third and final part). Fernão Lopes is believed by some modern historians to also be the author of an anonymous history of the constable Nuno Álvares Pereira and, more contentiously, of a summary chronicle of the first several kings of Portugal (of which two drafts exist — one of the first five kings (Porto MS), another of the first seven (Cadaval or '1419' MS).

Fernão Lopes held his official positions until around 1454, when he was forced to retire on account of his advanced age, and was succeeded by Gomes Eanes de Zurara. Lopes died sometime after 1459.

The last known information about Fernão Lopes states that he was still living in 1459, when he challenged the rights of an illegitimate grandson to his inheritance. The date of his death is uncertain. According to information in the preface of the Chronica de El-Rei D. Pedro I, written by Luciano Cordeiro, after leaving the role of chief guard, Fernão Lopes would still have lived for another five years, dying close to the age of 80.

Fernão Lopes was married to an aunt of the shoemaker Diogo Afonso's wife, leaving a son, Master Martinho, who was "physical" (doctor) of the infant D. Fernando. Martinho had a bastard son, Nuno Martins.

It has been controversially alleged by some historians (starting with Damião de Góis) that later 16th-century chroniclers Duarte Galvão and Ruy de Pina composed their chronicles of the remaining reigns from draft manuscripts left behind by Fernão Lopes — not merely drawing upon them, but plagiarizing them in whole or in part, to the point that Fernão Lopes is sometimes credited as their joint author. While there is some evidence that Galvão's chronicle of Afonso I might have copied parts from Lopes's manuscripts, historians generally agree that the accusation against Ruy de Pina is largely unmerited and unjust.

== Works ==
Uncontested (written by Fernão Lopes in 1430s & 1440s; original manuscripts lost; first published in 17th and 18th centuries on the basis of draft copies produced in the early 16th century.)

- ("Chronicle of king Peter I") Crónica de el-rei D. Pedro (Chronicle of the King D. Pedro I), first published 1816 in J.F. Correia da Serra, editor, Collecção de livros ineditos de historia portugueza, Vol.IV Lisbon: Academia das Ciências de Lisboa.
- ("Chronicle of king Fernando I") Crónica de el-rei D. Fernando, first published 1816 in J.F. Correia da Serra, editor, Collecção de livros ineditos de historia portugueza, Vol.IV Lisbon: Academia das Ciências de Lisboa.
- ("Chronicle of king John I, Part I & Part II" ) Chronica del Rey D. Ioam I de Boa Memoria, e dos Reys de Portugal o Decimo, Primeira Parte, em Que se contem A Defensam do Reyno até ser eleito Rey & Segunda Parte, em que se continuam as guerras com Castella, desde o Principio de seu reinado ate as pazes , first published 1644, Lisbon: A. Alvarez.

Contested:

- ("General Chronicle of the Kingdom") Crónica de Portugal ou Crónica Geral do Reino (reported existing in late 15th century, since lost; alleged by some to be the missing source text of Duarte Galvão and Ruy de Pina)
- Chronicle of 1419:
  - ("Chronicle of the first Five kings of Portugal", Porto MS) Crónica dos Cinco Reis de Portugal (1945 title for manuscript cod.886 discovered 1942 in Biblioteca Municipal do Porto)
  - ("Chronicle of the first Seven Kings or 1419, Cadaval MS.) Crónica dos Sete Primeiros Reis de Portugal (1952 title) or Crónica de Portugal de 1419 (1998 title) (manuscript cod. 965, dated as begun in 1419, discovered in archives of Casa Cadaval)
- ("Chronicle of Nuno Álvares Pereira") Coronica do condestabre de purtugall Nuno aluarez Pereyra, first published 1526, Lisbon: Germão Galharde (anonymous; probably used by Lopes rather than written by him.)
