= Will of Afonso II of Portugal =

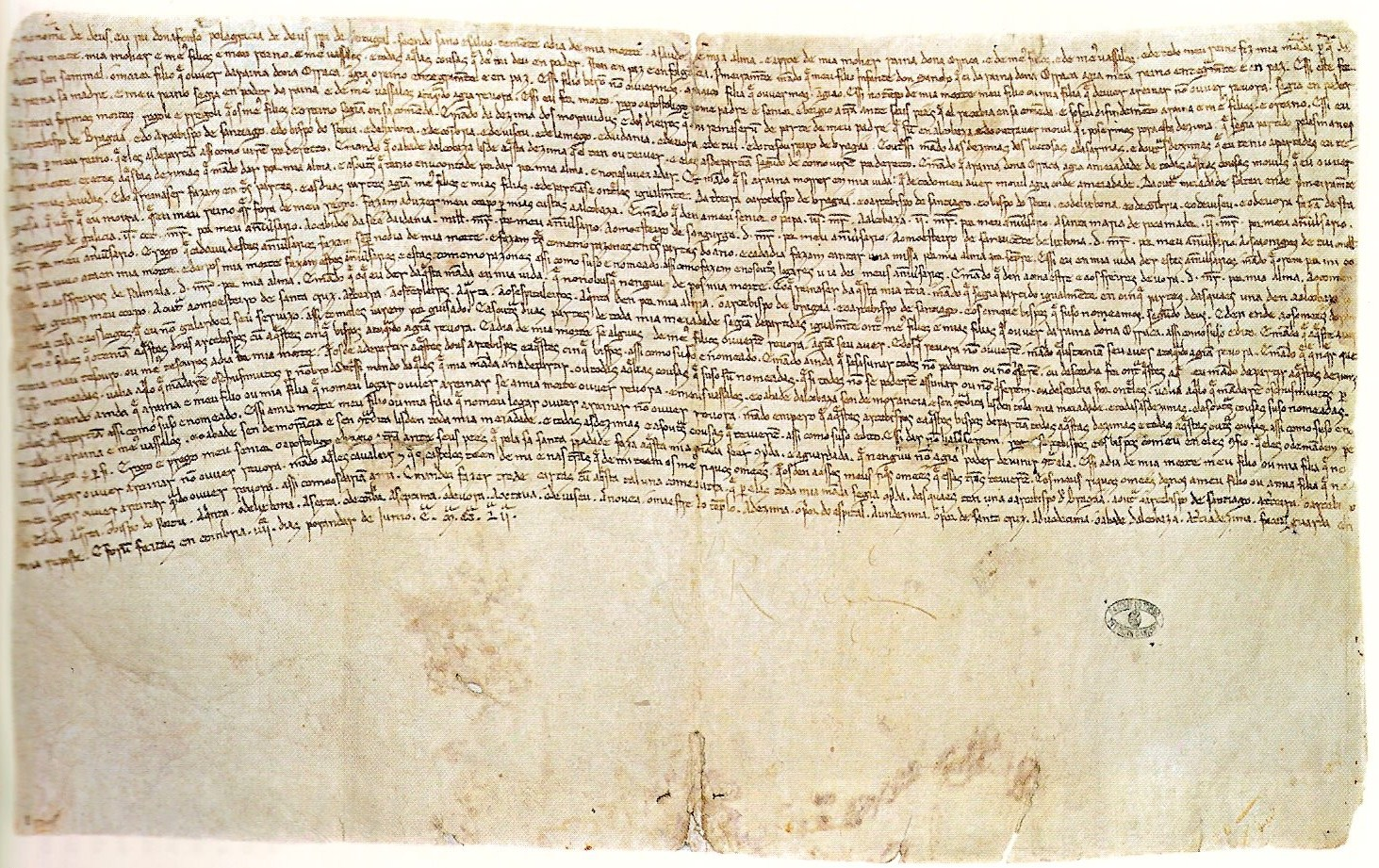
The Will of Afonso II preserved at the Torre do Tombo archives

The Will of King Afonso II is among the oldest known documents written in Galician-Portuguese. It was written in Coimbra and is dated June 27, 1214.

It has reached our days through two manuscripts, one of which was sent to the Archbishop of Braga and is currently in the Torre do Tombo National Archives.

== Dating and historical importance ==
The will of Afonso II, drawn up on June 27, 1214, is the document most often mentioned and celebrated as the first text written in Portuguese.

There are several possibly older manuscripts (most, however, with imprecise dating) that already show many of the characteristics of what would come to be considered a Romance language different from Latin, such as the "Pact of the Pais brothers" (ca. 1175) and Noticia de Torto (ca. 1214).

However, the royal nature of the document and the fact that it has an indisputable dating unlike other surviving documents of the time, and that it is indisputably written in a language other than Latin, makes it a point of reference of greater importance for language dating. Thus, in the year 2014, in the eighth-hundredth anniversary of the document, the anniversary of the Portuguese language was also celebrated, though some scholars pointed out that the language was already spoken prior to that date.

It was only in 1536 with the publication of Grammatica da Lingoagem Portuguesa by Fernão de Oliveira that the language entered its mature or modern phase.

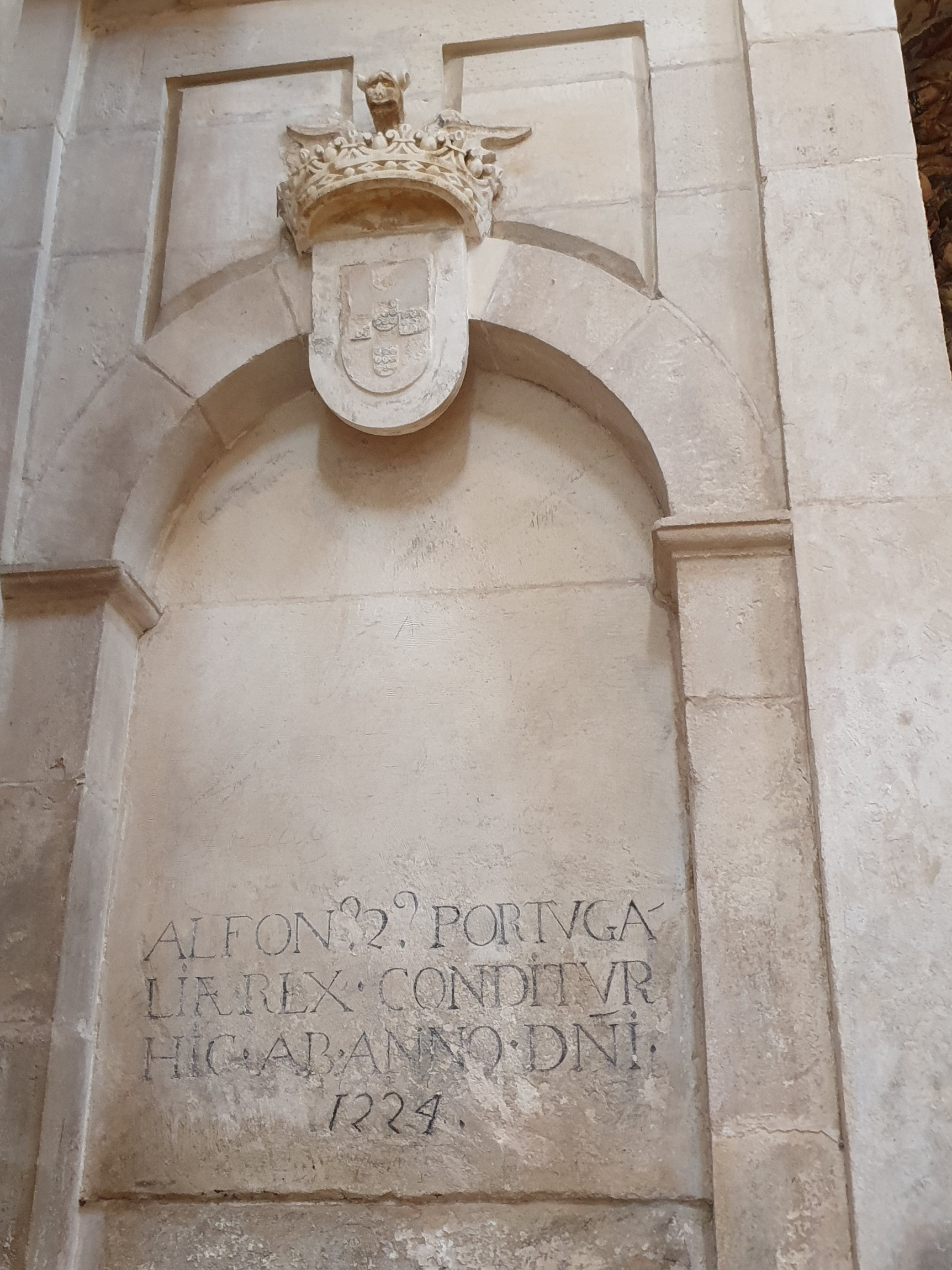
Tomb of Afonso II at the Alcobaça Monastery

== Excerpt ==
In Galician-Portuguese:

En’o nome de Deus. Eu rei don Afonso pela gracia de Deus rei de Portugal, seendo sano e saluo, temẽte o dia de mia morte, a saude de mia alma e a proe de mia molier raina dona Orraca e de meus filios e de meus uassalos e de todo meu reino fiz mia mãda per que depos mia morte mia molier e meus filios e meu reino e meus uassalos e todas aquelas cousas que Deus mi deu en poder sten en paz e en folgãcia. Primeiramente mãdo que meu filio infante don Sancho que ei da raina dona Orraca agia meu reino entegramente e en paz. E ssi este for morto sen semmel, o maior filio que ouuer da raina dona Orraca agia o reino entegramente e en paz.

In modern Portuguese:

Em nome de Deus. Eu, rei Dom Afonso pela Graça de Deus rei de Portugal, sendo são e salvo, temendo o dia da minha morte, a saúde da minha alma e a prole da minha mulher rainha Dona Urraca e a dos meus filhos e dos meus vassalos e de todo o meu reino fiz o meu testamento para que depois da minha morte a minha mulher e os meus filhos e o meu reino e os meus vassalos e todas aquelas coisas que Deus me deu em poder estejam em paz e em folgança. Primeiramente mando que o meu filho infante Dom Sancho que tive da rainha Dona Urraca haja o meu reino integralmente e em paz. E assim se este for morto sem descendência, o filho mais velho que houver da rainha Dona Urraca receba o reino integralmente e em paz.

In modern English:

In the name of God. I, King Dom Afonso by the Grace of God King of Portugal, being safe and sound, fearing the day of my death, the health of my soul and the offspring of my wife Queen Dona Urraca and my children and my vassals and all my kingdom I made my will so that after my death my wife and my children and my kingdom and my vassals and all those things that God gave me in power may be at peace and at ease. First, I order that my son Dom Sancho that I had from Queen Dona Urraca have my kingdom fully and in peace. And so if he is killed without descendants, the eldest son of Queen Dona Urraca that lives will receive the kingdom in full and in peace.
