= Bernardo de Brito =

Portuguese monk and historian (1569–1617)

Bernardo de Brito OCist
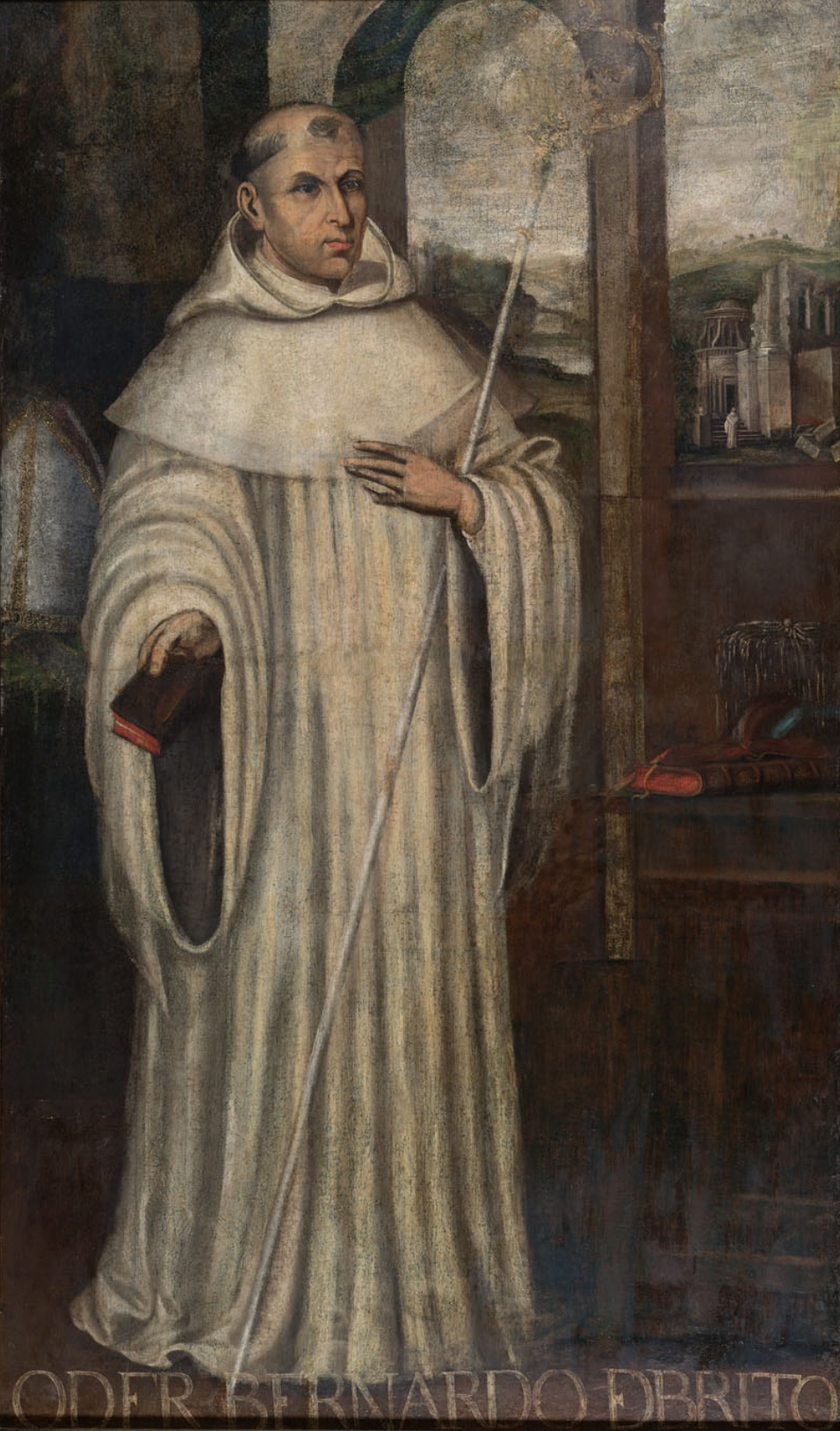

Chief Chronicler of the Kingdom of Portugal
- In office 12 July 1614 – 27 February 1617
- Monarch: Philip II of Portugal
- Preceded by: Francisco de Andrade
- Succeeded by: João Baptista Lavanha

Personal details
- Born: Baltasar de Brito e Andrade; 20 August 1569 Almeida, Kingdom of Portugal
- Died: 27 February 1617 (aged 47) Almeida, Kingdom of Portugal

Friar Bernardo de Brito OCist (20 August 1569 – 27 February 1617) was a Cistercian monk, historian, and the official chronicler of the Kingdom of Portugal in the early 17th-century. He is considered among the most complex and influential figures in Iberian historiography. Brito is known primarily for the codification of the "Legend of Nazaré" contained within the monumental national chronicle Monarchia Lusitana. Writing during the period of the Iberian Union, Brito blended spiritual mythology and military history in a narrative that helped to shape and maintain the cultural and historical consciousness of the Portuguese nation.

Portions of the Monarchia Lusitana dealing with the life of Dom Fuas Roupinho, a 12th-century nobleman should, however, be viewed with skepticism and caution as modern scholarship has shown that Brito utilized his position to systematically create false historical chronologies and narratives pertaining to Roupinho's life.

At the time that the Monarchia Lusitana was published, nevertheless, Brito's fabrications in the narratives were so elaborate and well done that all the events were accepted as factual for nearly four centuries.

== Brito's early years ==
Friar Bernardo de Brito was born Baltasar de Brito e Andrade in Almeida, Portugal in 1569. Brito's father, Captain Pedro Cardoso de Andrade, was an aristocrat who fought for Portugal in European conflicts. Captain Andrade expected his son to follow in his footsteps and sent Brito to Rome and Florence for an education. After the events of 1580-1583 including Portugal's succession crisis, the War of the Portuguese Succession, and the merger of the Spanish and Portuguese empires under the Spanish Habsburgs, Brito returned to Portugal where on 23 February 1585 he entered the Cistercian Order at the Alcobaça Monastery.

During his first year at the monastery, Brito, as a novice, underwent intense training, prayer, and study; demonstrated and proved his discipline; took his vows of poverty, chastity, and obedience; and assumed his religious name of Bernardo de Brito. Over the next four years, Brito received his formative monastic education which included mastering classical philosophy. In 1590, Brito was sent to the College of São Bernardo in Coimbra where he began to actively work toward his Doctorate in Theology. It was during this time that Brito, encouraged by the Cistercian leadership, began to study and write about the ancient history of Portugal.

At the end of 1596, Brito paused his studies at the College of São Bernardo and returned to the monastery. Back at the monastery in early 1597, Brito printed and published the first volume of a history of Portugal, which he called Monarchia Lusitana (Parte Primeira). The narrative in first volume of Brito's history covered the mythic and ancient world presenting Portugal's history from the time of the Biblical creation up to the birth of Jesus Christ. Brito dedicated the volume to King Philip I and outlined how in a multi-volume chronicle he would link the history and bloodlines of Portugal to the Spanish Habsburg Crown. Although this flattered the king, the content of the first volume only went as far as arguing that Portugal was founded by the mythical King Luso directly after the Biblical flood endured by Noah. Nevertheless, King Philip I was delighted and issued a royal charter which not only protected and funded Brito's work, but also commanded the young monk to continue his work.

Following that recognition, Brito took the first visible steps as a Portuguese nationalist intent upon preventing Spain from eradicating Portugal's identity, culture and language. From his studies, Brito was fully aware that the Spanish had absorbed other independent Iberian kingdoms such as Aragon and Granada. Supported by the Cistercian leadership, academics at the College of São Bernardo, and discontented Portuguese nobility, Brito was intent upon assuring that the Portuguese nobility remembered their roots and that the concept of an independent Portugal remained alive. Brito believed that the Portuguese were a superior race and in Monarchia Lusitana he set out to prove that Portugal was older and greater than Spain. To make his case, Brito relied upon both mythology such as the King Luso creation story and Portugal's history of successfully fending off Spanish domination.

Given the support and encouragement of King Philip I and the Cistercian Order, Brito continued his research of the history of Portugal and spent the next several years documenting his findings and balancing the interests of his patrons. In 1602, Brito printed and published Primeira Parte da Chronica de Cister, a history of the growth and expansion of the Cistercian Order. Created in part to ensure that he would continue to receive the support of the monastery, the chronicle presented documentation that depicted the Cistercian Order as the spiritual backbone of Portugal with divine property protections. In 1603, Brito printed and published Elogios dos Reis de Portugal, a collection of flattering portraits of Portuguese monarchs. And as he had done in the past, Brito dedicated the book to the Spanish Habsburg monarch, King Philip II. Once again, this met with the Crown's approval as the king believed that the research and documentation of bloodlines and lineages was progressing nicely.

On 12 April 1606, Brito received a doctorate in Theology from the University of Coimbra. Immediately thereafter, the Cistercian Order appointed him Chronicler-General. With that appointment, Brito was relieved from the everyday duties of a monk including communal chores, repetitive liturgies, and administrative tasks. Historical research, documentation, and authorship became his primary responsibilities. In addition, Brito was given the authority and clearance to inspect, copy, and reference restricted manuscripts, ecclesiastical records, and foundational texts preserved in Cistercian libraries across Europe. And finally, the appointment assured that Brito would be supplied the financial support, personnel, materials that were required to print and publish his findings.

== Brito's publication of Monarchia Lusitana ==
In 1609, Brito printed and published three books of his second volume of the history of Portugal, Monarchia Lusitana (Parte Segunda). Book 5 continues the history of Portugal covering the Roman Era and the introduction and spread of Christianity. Chapters 27-28 of Book 6 recount the journey of a Black Madonna relic from Nazareth at the time of Christ's birth through the Roman and Visigothic eras to Portugal, where it was later hidden from the Moorish invasion until its medieval rediscovery.

Several chapters in Book 7 chronicle events in the life of nobleman, Dom Fuas Roupinho, over a four year period in the 12th-century. Brito outlines how Roupinho commanded Portuguese military forces and fought with distinction against various Muslim factions. As one of Roupinho's earliest feats, Brito wrote of a land campaign where Roupinho defeated a Moor named Gamir who was the king of the city-state of Mérida. After the victory, Roupinho paraded Gamir's entire captive army into Coimbra. Later in the book, Brito tells of the exploits of Roupinho as he led the Portuguese in a two year campaign against Almohad invaders on land and at sea. In a land campaign during the year 1180, Brito tells how Roupinho defeated a large contingent of Almohad raiders who had landed at the port of São Martinho do Porto and then marched inland to siege the castle at Porto de Mós. By means of a nighttime attack, Roupinho surprised and defeated the Almohads, forcing them back to their galleys.

In this same account, Brito tells how Roupinho then traveled to Lisbon where he directed the modification of merchant vessels into a naval squadron of nine warships over a two-week period. Then as overall commander of the Portuguese naval taskforce, Roupinho in a highly structured fleet operation intercepted and defeated Almohad naval taskforce at the Battle of Cape Espichel. Shortly after the battle. Roupinho was then given the title of "Admiral" by the Portuguese King, Afonso I. Roupinho then quickly organized an attack on the Almohad naval port at Ceuta in North Africa where he destroyed the entire Muslim navy.

Brito concludes this history of Roupinho with the events of the year 1182 wherein a naval fleet commanded by Roupinho is ambushed by two large Almohad taskforces at Silves and suffers a great loss. Roupinho, nevertheless, leads a Portuguese taskforce of 21 vessels on a retaliatory raid into the Almohads harbor at Ceuta in North Africa four months later. In the ensuing battle, Roupinho's vessels are surrounded and Roupinho is killed.

In another chapter of Book 7, Brito codifies, for the first time, the oral foundational myth known as the "Legend of Nazaré" in which Roupinho's life is saved by means of a miracle which immediately leads to the discovery of the Black Madonna relic brought to Portugal from Nazareth. In gratitude, Roupinho dedicates his personal lands to the Virgin Mary and orders that a memorial chapel be built to protect and enshrine the Black Madonna.

As a part of these histories of Roupinho, Brito also implies that Roupinho was a trusted companion of King Afonso I. Through such a narratives, Brito positions Roupinho as a pillar of the Portuguese military and a national hero.

== Brito's final years ==
In 1614, after the death of Francisco de Andrada, Brito was appointed Chief Chronicler of Portugal by King Philip II. The position was the highest ranked intellectual post within Portugal's state institutions combing the duties of the state historian, keeper of the royal archives, and chief propagandist. It gave Brito full authority over Portugal's history and brought additional visibility and recognition to the histories that he had completed to that date including the books of Monarchia Lusitana.

In 1617 while traveling, Brito fell ill. He never recovered and died on 27 February at the age of 47. Following Brito's death, the Spanish Habsburg Crown had a series of monastic chroniclers assigned through the years in an attempt to complete the Monarchia Lusitana. The work continued for over a century during which time four successive chroniclers added six additional volumes, each composed of numerous internal books, expanding the Monarchia Lusitana into an eight volume epic. Ultimately, work on the history ended in 1729 when Frei Manuel dos Santos completed the history of King Fernando I; the Portuguese interregnum and war of succession spanning 1383–1385; and the acclimation of King João I in volume eight. As a result, the Monarchia Lusitana historical narrative ends in the year 1385 before the beginning of Portugal's overseas expansion and the rise of the House of Braganza.

== The deception ==
Modern scholarship has now revealed that much of Brito's history pertaining to Portugal in the late 12th-century particularly regarding Roupinho is fictitious. In an effort to create a national figure, Brito took Roupinho, an authentic 12th-century nobleman associated with the miracle at Nazaré, and added fictitious layers to his biography. As opposed to simply reporting a local folk narrative, Brito reinvented and chronologically altered the life of Roupinho.

When the first English language histories of Portugal were published in the 19th and 20th-centuries, historians such as Edward McMurdo and H.V. Livermore repeated Brito's fabrications as factual history. McMurdo wrote his history in the late 19th-century by translating Brito's Monarchia Lusitana to English and presenting the entire narrative – including the Almohad landing at São Martinho do Porto, the siege of Porto de Mós, and Roupinho's role and participation in numerous sea battles – as factual.

Livermore in his research relied upon Portuguese state-sanctioned narratives that had been published during Portugal's Estado Novo regime when Portugal's government heavily promoted the romanticized, chivalric image of Roupinho as a founding father of the nation's military glory. In his histories, Livermore accepted the state-sanctioned narratives as reliable historical sources without further examination or investigation.

In the late 20th-century, historians including José Mattoso and Christophe Picard conducted their research on the history of Portugal in a cross-reference manner comparing data and facts across multiple independent sources to eliminate bias and validate historical events. In their work, Brito's narratives regarding Roupinho as contained in the Monarchia Lusitana were compared to what had been reported in the institutional records of the Portuguese monarchs; the Crónica de Portugal de 1419; official Almohad state histories including military campaign records; and monastic and ecclesiastical records of property ownership, transactions and rights. At the conclusion of their examinations, it was their independent conclusions that Brito's narrative pertaining to the life of Roupinho was fictitious.

Relative to one of the first heroic feats of Roupinho, cross-referenced Islamic registries indicate that Mérida was a tightly integrated Almohad province with no independent king. A review of the campaign records of the Almohad Caliphate shows absolutely no mention of an army landing at São Martinho do Porto, marching inland, and besieging the Castle of Porto de Mós or engaging in a nighttime battle with Roupinho. Relative to Portuguese records, there are no surviving charters, royal letters, or contemporary documents from 1180 mentioning an Almohad siege of Porto de Mós.

Relative to sea battles that took place between July 1180 (Cape Espichel) and September 1184 (Ceuta), it is not believed that Roupinho participated in any of the four battles in any manner whatsoever contrary to what Brito had written.

In Portugal's royal chancellery records, there is no mention of Roupinho's participation in the Battle of Cape Espichel. Given his assigned role as a representative of the Portuguese Crown and military commander responsible for the protection of strategic fortifications including Coimbra, Leiria and Porto de Mós, it is assumed that at the time of the sea battle, he remained in Portugal's interior defending against potential Almohad land-based initiatives. Brito's claim that Roupinho was elevated by King Afonso I shortly thereafter to the level of "Admiral" cannot be verified by contemporary evidence. There is no mention of such a appointment in surviving Portuguese diplomatics, charters, or administrative records.

Likewise, there is no evidence that Roupinho led or even participated in the raid upon Ceuta approximately six months after the battle at Cape Espichel. As a hoste or army commander in charge of defending Portugal's frontier, Roupinho had no experience navigating the tides of the Atlantic Ocean or the Mediterranean Sea nor was he qualified to command a fleet of naval vessels through the heavily guarded Strait of Gibraltar. With regard to the Battle of Silves which occurred in 1184 during the Siege of Santarém (1184), royal Portuguese documents indicate that Roupinho was in Portugal's interior, helping to coordinate the defense of Santarém alongside King Afonso I and Prince Sancho. Finally, cross-references of Almohad records pertaining to the retaliatory raid on Ceuta classify the action as a battle with privateers. Even though Brito claimed that Roupinho died valiantly in the battle, it seems improbable that Roupinho, an army commander would abandon his assignment of defending frontier fortifications to participate in a desperate naval suicide mission.

In the Monachia Lusitana, Brito dated 1182 as the year in which the Battle of Silves and the retaliatory raid on Ceuta occurred, however, this is not factual. Brito intentionally changed the dates in support of his falsified chronology. He needed to do so as he had claimed that the miracle at Nazaré occurred on 14 September 1182 and that Roupinho immediately retired to monastic life after being saved from death. Consequently, Brito needed to redate the aforementioned sea battles to a time prior to the miracle at Nazaré. As previously mentioned, scholars know that the Battle of Silves and the retaliatory raid on Ceuta took place in 1184 from royal Portuguese documents that link the events to the Siege of Santarém.

Relative to the miracle at Nazaré, there is an absolute void of 12th-century documentation confirming any such event. Royal Portuguese records from the reigns of Afonso I and Sancho I never mention the cliffside incident. As a result, it would seem that the foundational myth of the "Legend of Nazaré" was used by Brito to create a grand narrative pertaining to life of Roupinho and for an ulterior motive associated with the Alcobaça monastery and the Cistercian Order.

== Brito's motives ==
Although a significant portion of the Monarchia Lusitana is highly factual and based on rigorous, genuine archival work, it is believed that Brito and his successors did not write all of the narratives as objective histories. Narratives such as those pertaining to the miracle at Nazaré and the military exploits of Roupinho seem to have been written with two ulterior motives in mind. Brito’s primary motive seems to have been to protect the status and economic interests of his monastery, Alcobaça.

Using the narrative of the Black Madonna relic being discovered by Roupinho at Nazaré, Brito linked the monastery back to the very birth of Jesus; positioned the monastery’s land as physically chosen by the divine; and provided the monastery with an unassailable title to the land. In addition, Brito claims that before he published the Monarchia Lusitana, he discovered a "Donation Charter" written by Roupinho in 1182 deeding the entire Sítio da Nazaré coastal territory to the Cistercian monks in gratitude for the miracle. Through such claims, Brito was able to assist the monastery in the protection and maintenance of valuable assets and revenues associated with real estate ownership, fishing rights, and farming. Here also, Brito's narratives, claims, and documents have been found to be fabrications. In the case of the "Donation Charter" of 1182, modern paleographers have proven that the charter was a 16th-century forgery generated by scribes at Alcobaça.

A second motive for Brito's fabrications regarding Roupinho appears to be that he wanted to ensure that the Portuguese language, identity, and culture were not eradicated by the Spanish Habsburgs. Following the unification of the crowns in 1580, Portuguese nobility, clergy, and intellectuals faced increasing political alienation under Spanish Habsburg governance. Brito's focus on the "Legend of Nazaré" and Roupinho’s heroic exploits attempted to make the argument that Portugal had sacred origins and glorious bloodlines and that Portugal ought to be considered as an equal to Spain as opposed to a conquered province.

== Conclusion ==
Brito is seen today as a brilliant 17th-century archivist and author who was largely responsible for the creation of the Monarchia Lusitana, a multi-volume history of Portugal. With regard to the "Legend of Nazaré" and the life of Roupinho, however, Brito departed from his official role and created intricate false narratives to promote his own ulterior motives.

Brito's deceptions were so well done that he ultimately altered the true history of a small number of events in 12th-century Portugal. His work was so convincing in its time that his successors did not question or make corrections to his histories when they continued the writing of the Monarchia Lusitana after his death. As a result, the narratives with their distortions were codified and accepted as fact in Portuguese history books for centuries and spread across Europe. Even into the 19th and 20th-century, authors such as McMurdo and H.V. Livermore were taken in by Brito's deceptions.

Reflecting on the transgressions that Brito committed in the interest of Portugal as a nation while occupied by Spain, modern evaluations often view his actions contextually as an effort to save the cultural identity of his country.

== Citations ==
- Barroca, Mário Jorge (2019). Os feitos de D. Fuas Roupinho na Crónica de 1419 (in Portuguese). Porto: Faculdade de Letras da Universidade do Porto.
- Brito, Frei Bernardo de (1597). Monarchia Lusitana: Parte Primeira (in Portuguese). Lisbon: Mosteiro de S. Bernardo.
- Brito, Frei Bernardo de (1602). Primeira Parte da Chronica de Cister, onde se cantão as cousas principais desta ordem & muitas antiguidades do Reyno de Portugal (in Portuguese). Lisbon: Pedro Crasbeek.
- Brito, Frei Bernardo de (1603). Elogios dos Reis de Portugal com os mais verdadeiros retratos que se puderão achar (in Portuguese). Lisbon: Pedro Crasbeeck.
- Brito, Frei Bernardo de (1609). Monarchia Lusitana: Parte Segunda (in Portuguese). Lisbon: Mosteiro de S. Bernardo.
- Correia, Arlindo (2006). "Monarquia Lusitana e os seus autores". Estudos de História de Alcobaça (in Portuguese). 12: 4–8.
- Espírito Santo, Arnaldo do (1998). Frei Bernardo de Brito: O Historiador e o Mitógrafo. Lisbon: Colibri.
- "Frei Bernardo de Brito". Infopédia.
- Gloël, Matthias (2017). "Bernardo de Brito: A Misunderstood Portuguese Chronicler" (PDF). e-Journal of Portuguese History. 15 (2): 31–51.
- Herculano, Alexandre (1881). "Monumentos Pátrios: A Lenda de Nazaré e D. Fuas Roupinho". Opúsculos: Tomo V (Controvérsias e Estudos Históricos, Volume I) (in Portuguese). Lisbon: Viuva Bertrand & C.ª. pp. 93–114.
- Livermore, H. V. (1966). A New History of Portugal. Cambridge: Cambridge University Press.
- McMurdo, Edward (1888). The History of Portugal: From the Commencement of the Monarchy to the Reign of Alfonso III. Vol. 1. London: S. Low, Marston, Searle, & Rivington.
- Mattoso, José (2006). D. Afonso Henriques (in Portuguese). Lisbon: Temas e Debates.
- Olival, Fernanda (2017). "Bernardo de Brito: A Misunderstood Portuguese Chronicler". e-Journal of Portuguese History. Brown University.
- Penteado, Pedro (2008). Santuário da Senhora da Nazaré: Culto, Cristianização e Legitimação de Espaço Económico (in Portuguese). Lisbon: Alto Comissariado para a Imigração e Diálogo Intercultural.
- Picard, Christophe (2000). Le Portugal musulman (VIIIe-XIIIe siècle): L'Occident d'al-Andalus sous domination islamique (in French). Paris: Maisonneuve et Larose.
- Picard, Christophe (1997). L'océan Atlantique musulman: de la conquête arabe à l'époque almohade: navigation et mise en valeur des côtes d'al-Andalus et du Maghreb (in French). Paris: Maisonneuve & Larose / Ed. de l'Unesco. ISBN 978-2-7068-1254-5.
- São Boaventura, Frei Fortunato de (1827). História Cronológica e Crítica da Real Abadia de Alcobaça. Lisbon: Imprensa Nacional.
