= Apocalypse of Lorvão =

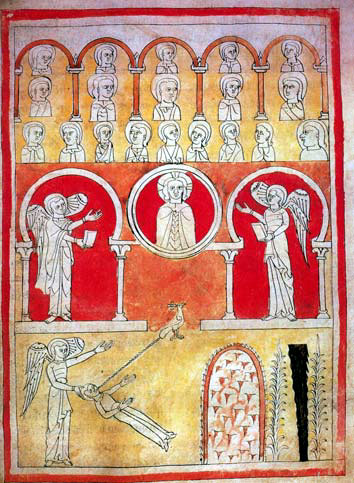
- Author: Egeas, Lorvão monastery
- Publication date: 1189
- Publication place: Portugal
- Media type: laid paper
- Torre do Tombo National Archive

The Apocalypse of Lorvão is an illuminated manuscript from Lorvão, Portugal containing the Commentary on the Apocalypse of Beatus of Liébana Monastery, Spain.

It is currently kept at the Torre do Tombo National Archive in Lisbon.

== History ==
This is a well-dated manuscript whose origin is identified through its colophon, which indicates that it was completed in 1189 in the scriptorium of the Lorvão monastery in the present municipality of Penacova, near Coimbra. It was signed by the scribe Egeas, who might also be the author of illustrations. It remained preserved in the abbey until the nineteenth century, including while the monastery changed denomination in 1205 and hosted a Cistercian community.

The historian Alexandre Herculano discovered the manuscript in the library of the monastery in 1853 and transferred it to the national archives of Portugal in Lisbon to be part of the corpus of documents and texts in the history of Portugal (Portugaliae Monumenta Historica). The manuscript is still preserved there.

It is one of eleven manuscripts of Beatus in the Iberian record of the Memory of the World Register by UNESCO in 2015.

== Description ==
This is the only manuscript of the Beatus Commentary on the Apocalypse of Liébana, also called Beatus, produced in Portugal during the Middle Ages. This is a relatively primitive version of the text, probably copied from a ninth century original. It is written in a Carolingian minuscule style that made the transition to the Gothic. His miniatures are at number 70, including 18 full-page, 20 of the half-page and the other smaller and variable dimensions. The manuscript also retains its original binding.

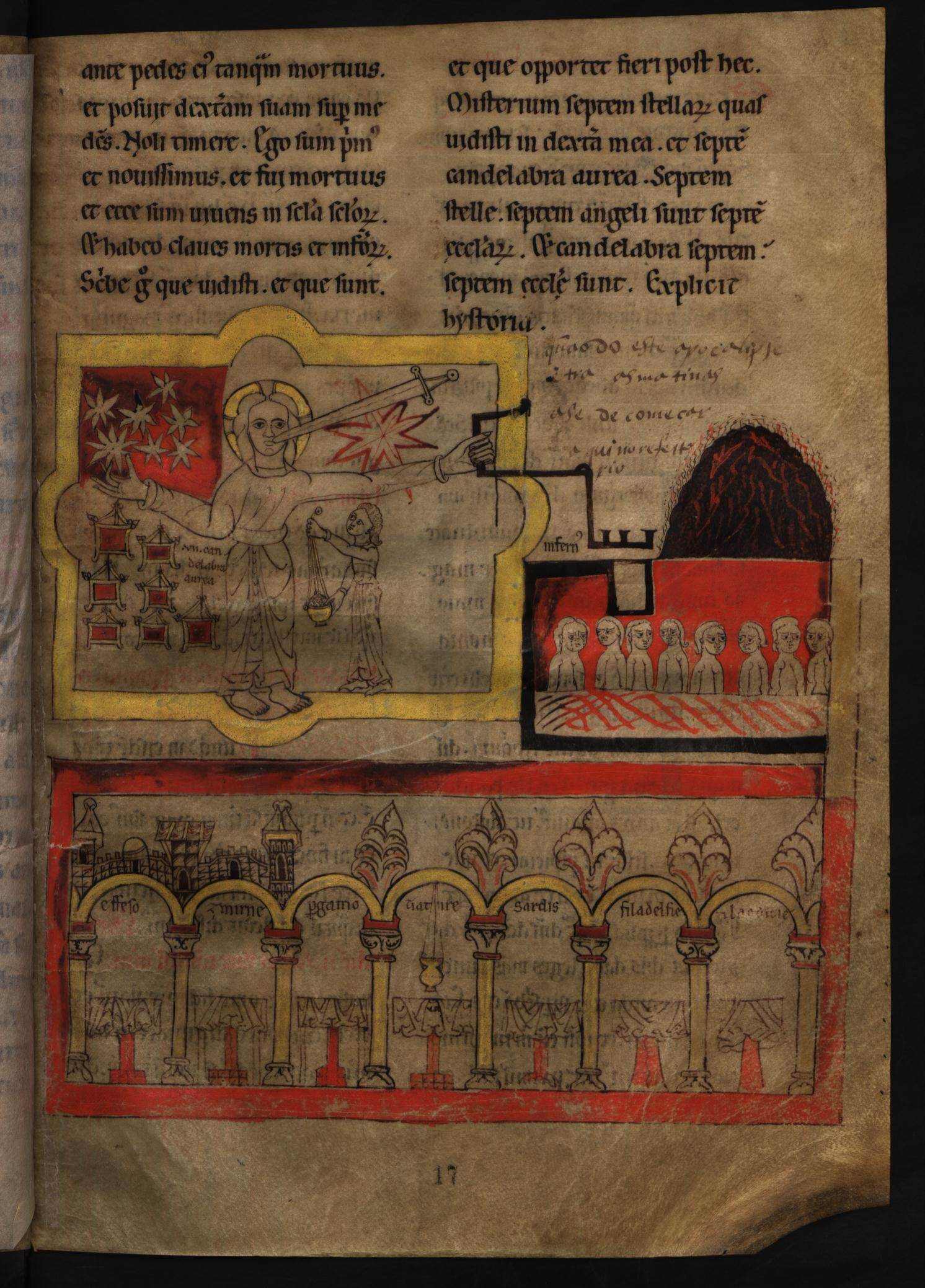
Mystery of the Seven Stars, f.17

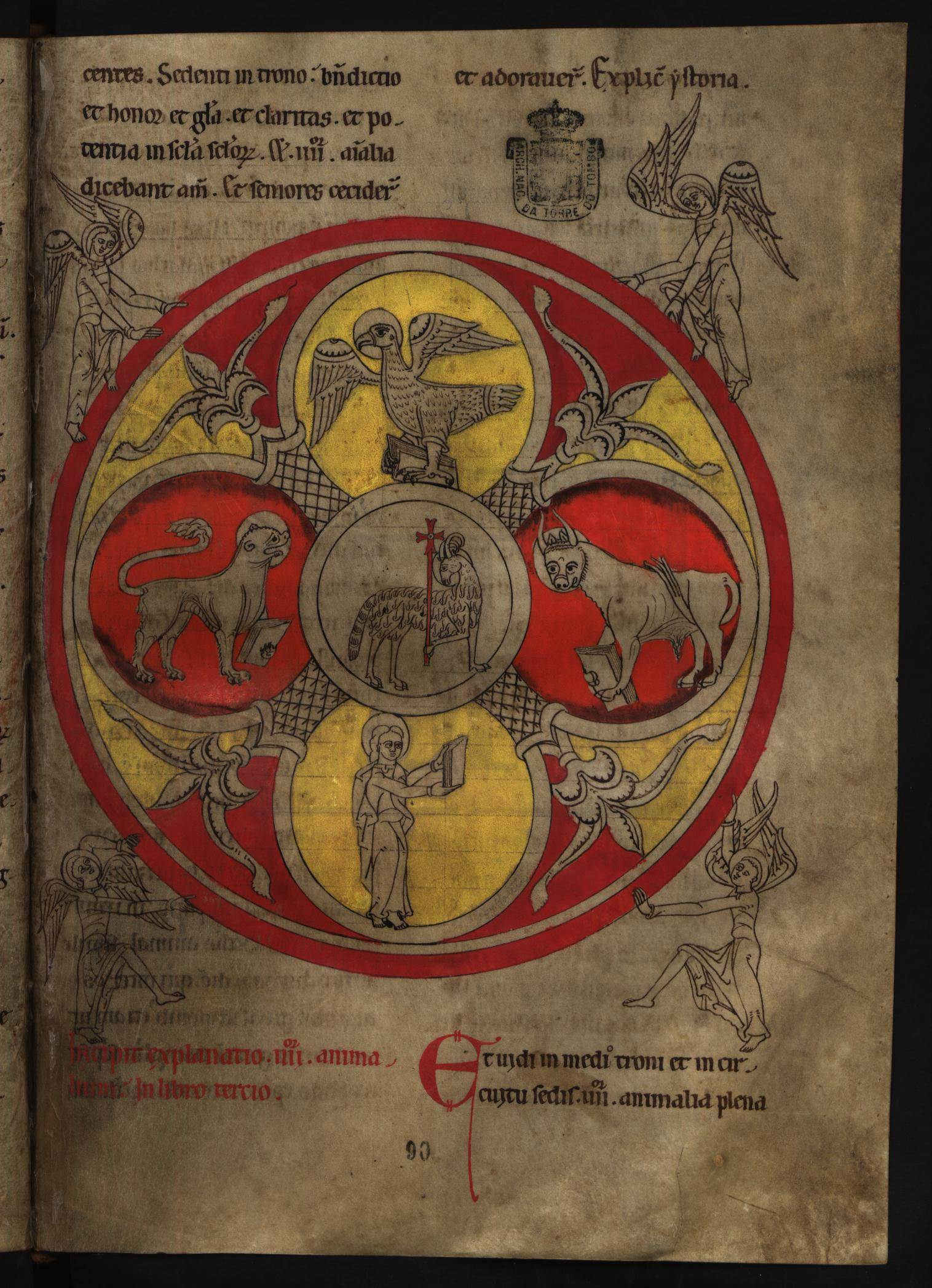
Vision of the Lamb and of the Four Symbols, f.90

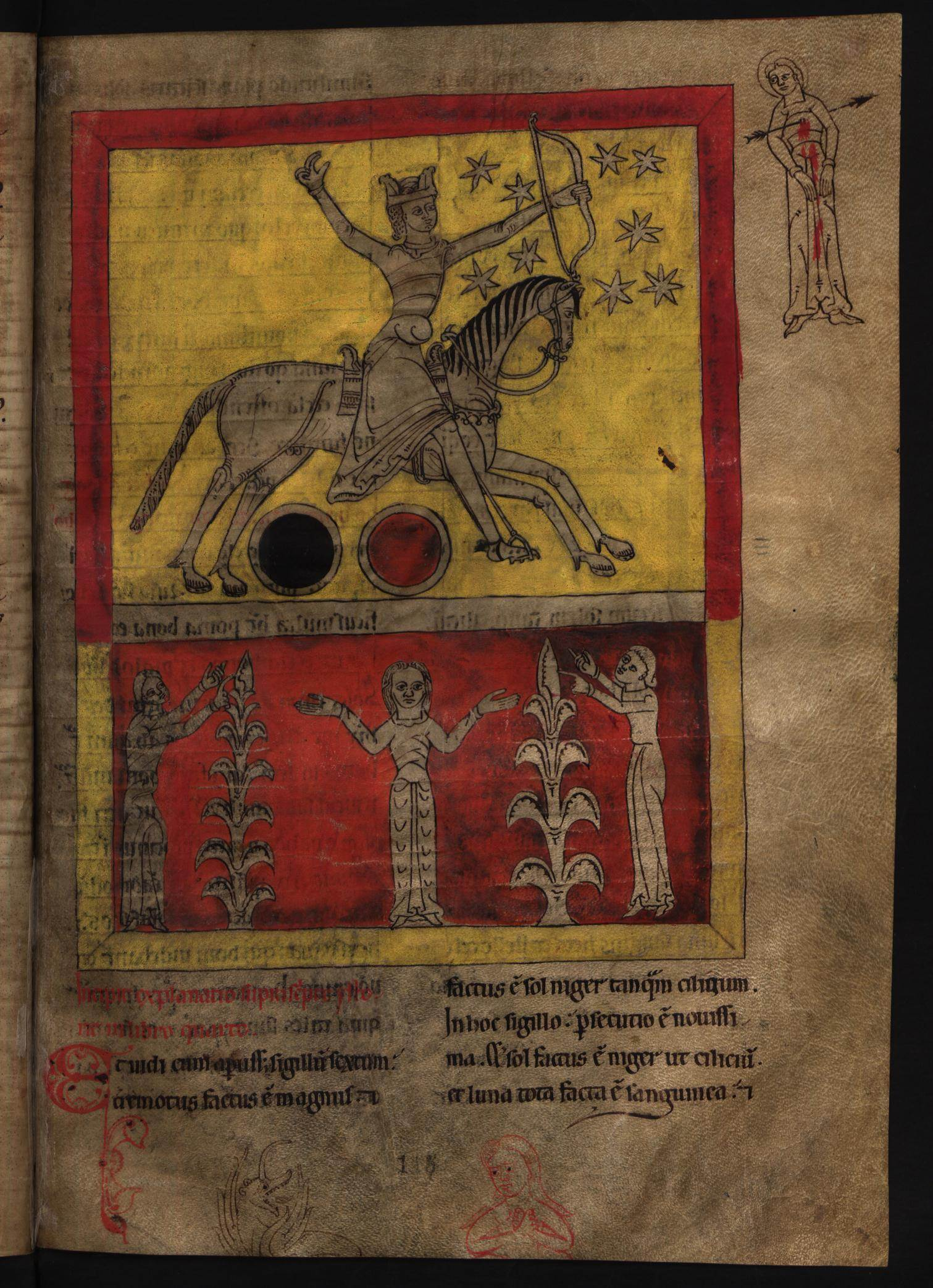
The Great Earthquake, f.115

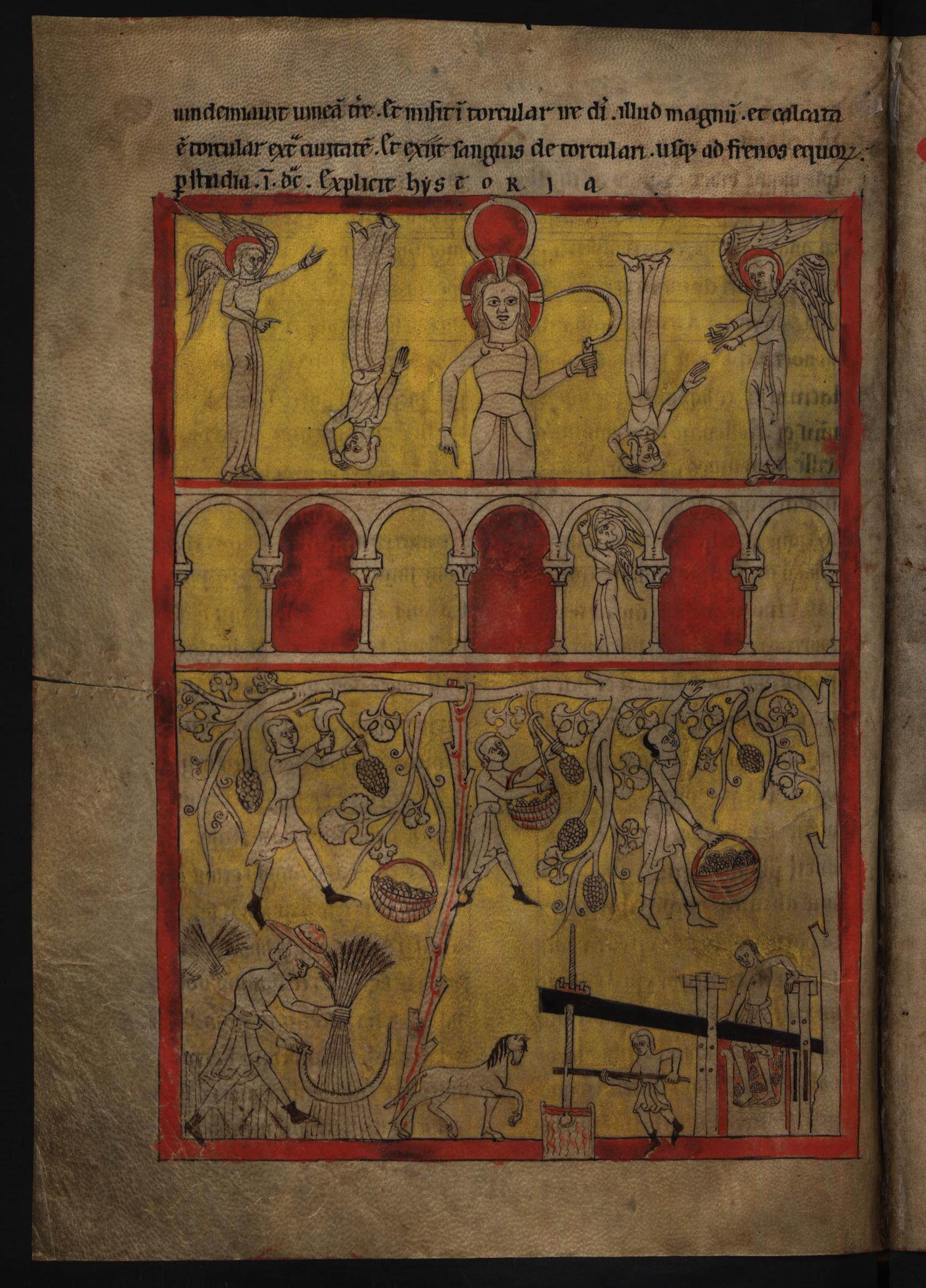
Harvesting Crops and Picking Grapes, f.172v.

These illustrations were considered archaic for the time, marked by a thick stroke and colors dominated by orange and yellow. They may have been copied from an older model, perhaps close to the original manuscript written by Beatus of Liebana. There are also repeatedly scenes of everyday life at the time of Sancho I of Portugal. Finally, Beatus map belonging to the manuscript has been preserved but only half of it. It was reunited with the manuscript after being separated from it.

== Bibliography ==
- John W. Williams, The illustrated Beatus. A corpus of the illustrations of the commentary on the Apocalypse, tome V, « The Twelfth and Thirteenth Centuries », Harvey Miller Publisher, 2003, 416 pages (ISBN 9780905203959 (notice 22)
- Jorge Silva Rocha, “Stemmatics and Image. Remarks on the Twelfth-Century Beatus Commentary on the Apocalypse of Lorvão”, Variants, 17-18 |2024, 63-85.URL: http://journals.openedition.org/variants/1662; DOI: https://doi.org/10.4000/130sb
- Jorge Manuel Gomes da Silva Rocha, L'image dans le Beatus de Lorvão : figuration, composition et visualité dans les enluminures du Commentaire à l'Apocalypse attribué au Scriptorium du Monastère de São Mamede de Lorvão – 1189, Thèse de doctorat en histoire de l'Université Libre de Bruxelles, Faculté de Philosophie et Lettres, 2007/2008 Online
- (in Portuguese) Anne De Egry, O apocalipse do Lorvão e a sua relação com as ilustrações medievais do Apocalipse. Lisboa : Gulbenkian, 1972. 145 p.
- Peter Klein, « The Whore of Babylone in the Beatus Codex of Lorvão », in C. Hediger (éd.), « Tout le temps du veneour est sanz oyseuseté ». Mélanges offerts à Yves Christe pour son 65ème anniversaire, Turnhout, Brepols (Culture et société médiévales, 8), 2005, p. 103-111
- (in Spanish) Beato de Liébana: Códice del Monasterio de San Mamede de Lorvao [fac-similé], Valencia: Patrimonio Ediciones, 2003. Online

== See also ==
- Beatus of Liébana
- Illuminated manuscripts
