= Noticia de Torto =

The "Notícia de Torto" [Notice about (the damage, offense, injury) – Galician-Portuguese] is a minuta of a notarial document written in the first decades of the 13th century, and though it does not contain any date it has been dated as between 1211 and 1216, the first reigning years of King Afonso II of Portugal. Together with the King's will (written in July 1214) it is considered the oldest known non-literary document of the Portuguese language. The title is a reference to its first line (De noticia de torto que fecerum a Laurencius Fernãdiz.. ). The text is about the persecutions, violence and robbery by the sons of Gonçalo Ramires against Lourenço Fernandes da Cunha, a noble of Braga, all of whom were heirs of Gonçalo Ramires. The document was probably written in the region of Braga.

This document is preserved at the Portuguese Nacional Archives.
