= Chief Chronicler of the Kingdom of Portugal =

Courtly position in the late medieval Kingdom of Portugal

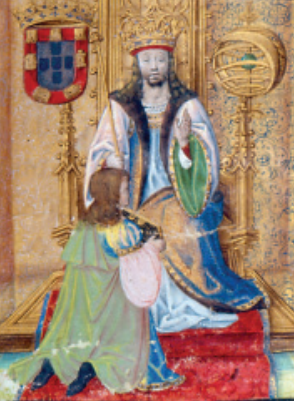
Chief Chronicler Rui de Pina presents King Manuel I with his Chronicle of King John II, c. 1497-1504.

Chief Chronicler of the Kingdom (Portuguese: Cronista-Mor do Reino) was a courtly position in the Kingdom of Portugal, formally instituted in 1434 by King Edward I. The Chief Chronicler was the official authority on Portuguese historiography, and the post was soon associated to the post of Keeper of the Royal Archives, already centralised in an autonomous way in the 1370s — a singularity in late medieval history in both its precocious creation and organisation.

The first to occupy the position was Fernão Lopes, in 1434. The last occupant was writer and politician Almeida Garrett, who was sacked in 1841, after fiercely criticising António José de Ávila (who was then Minister of the Exchequer), and no one was appointed to replace him. The following year, Minister of the Kingdom Costa Cabral issued a decree extinguishing the position of Chief Chronicler and transferring its responsibilities to the Keeper of the Royal Archives.

== List of Chief Chroniclers of the Kingdom ==
The following list is sorted by date of appointment:

1. 1434 – Fernão Lopes
2. 1459 – Gomes Eanes de Zurara
3. 1484 – Vasco Fernandes de Lucena
4. 1497 – Rui de Pina
5. 1525 – Fernão de Pina
6. 1550 – D. António Pinheiro
7. 1599 – Francisco de Andrade
8. 1614 – Fr. Bernardo de Brito OCist
9. 1618 – João Baptista Lavanha
10. 1625 – D. Manuel de Meneses
11. 1630 – Fr. António Brandão OCist
12. 1644 – Fr. Francisco Brandão OCist
13. 1682 – Fr. Rafael de Jesus OSB
14. 1695 – José de Faria
15. 1709 – Fr. Bernardo de Castelo Branco OCist
16. 1726 – Fr. Manuel dos Santos OCist
17. 1740 – Fr. Manuel da Rocha OCist
18. 1745 – Fr. António Botelho OCist
19. 1747 – Fr. José da Costa OCist
20. 1755 – Fr. António Caldeira OCist
21. 1784 – Fr. António da Mota OCist
22. 1807 – Fr. João Huet
23. 1822 – João Bernardo da Rocha Loureiro
24. 1823 – Fr. Cláudio da Conceição
25. 1835 – João Bernardo da Rocha Loureiro
26. 1838 – João Baptista de Almeida Garrett
