= Gomes Eanes de Zurara =

Portuguese chronicler

Gomes Eanes de Zurara ComC
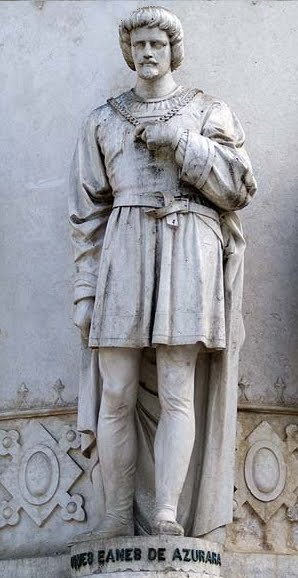
- A depiction of Zurara on the pedestal of the Camões monument, by Victor Bastos, 1860-67 (Praça Luís de Camões, Lisbon)

Chief Chronicler of the Kingdom of Portugal
- In office 6 June 1454 – c. 1474
- Monarch: Afonso V of Portugal
- Preceded by: Fernão Lopes
- Succeeded by: Vasco Fernandes de Lucena

High Guardian of the Royal Archives
- In office 6 June 1454 – c. 1474
- Monarch: Afonso V of Portugal
- Preceded by: Fernão Lopes
- Succeeded by: Afonso Eanes de Óbidos

Personal details
- Born: c. 1410 Kingdom of Portugal
- Died: c. 1474 Lisbon, Kingdom of Portugal

Gomes Eanes de Zurara (c. 1410 – c. 1474), sometimes spelled Eannes or Azurara, was a Portuguese chronicler of the European Age of Discovery, the most notable after Fernão Lopes.

== Life and career ==
Zurara adopted the career of letters in middle life. He probably entered the royal library as assistant to Fernão Lopes during the reign of King Edward of Portugal (1433–1438), and he had sole charge of it in 1452. His Chronicle of the Siege and Capture of Ceuta, a supplement (third part) to Lopes's Chronicle of King John I, dates from 1449 to 1450, and three years later he completed the first draft of the Chronicle of the Discovery and Conquest of Guinea, our authority for the early Portuguese voyages of discovery down the West African coast and in the ocean, more especially for those undertaken under the auspices of Prince Henry the Navigator. It contains some account of the life work of that prince, and it has biographical as well as geographical interest.

On 6 June 1454, Zurara became chief keeper of the archives and royal chronicler in succession to Lopes. In 1456 King Afonso V commissioned him to write the history of Ceuta, the land-gate of the East, under the governorship of D. Pedro de Menezes, from its capture in 1415 until 1437, and he had it ready in 1463. A year afterwards, the king charged him with writing a history of the deeds of D. Duarte de Menezes, captain of Alcácer-Ceguer. Proceeding to West Africa, he spent a year collecting materials and studying the scenes of the events he was to describe, and in 1468 he completed the chronicle. Afonso corresponded with Zurara on terms of affectionate intimacy, and no less than three comendas of the order of Christ rewarded his literary services.

Zurara had little of the picturesque ingenuousness of Lopes, and he loved to display his erudition by quotations and philosophical reflections, showing that he wrote under the influence of the first Renaissance. Many leading classical, early Christian and medieval writers figure in his pages; he was acquainted with the notable chronicles and romances of Europe and had studied the best Italian and Spanish authors. In addition, he had mastered the geographical system of the ancients and their astrology. As a historian he is laborious, accurate and conscientious, though his position did not allow him to tell the whole truth about his hero, Prince Henry.

== Chronicles ==
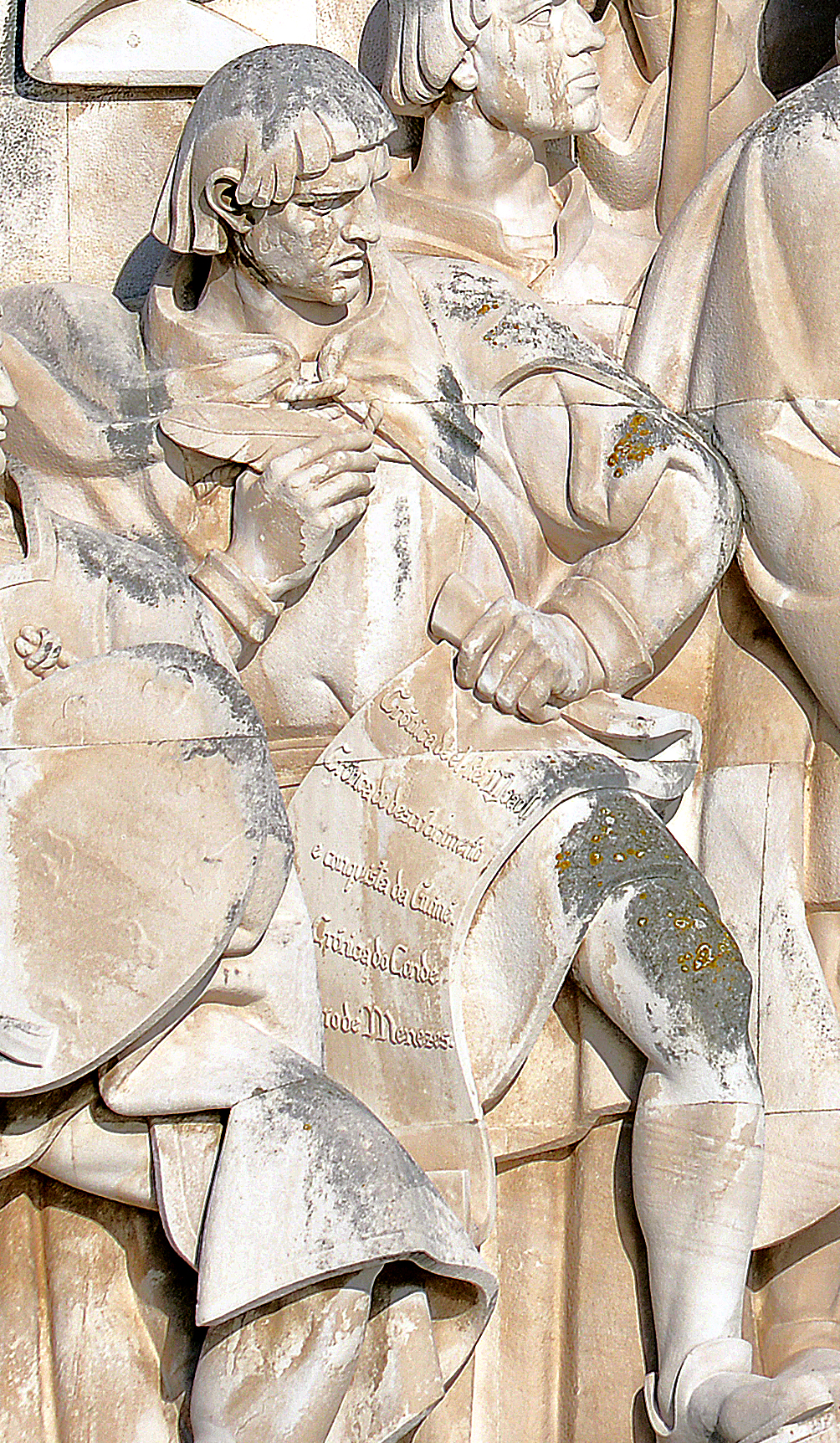
Effigy of Gomes Eanes de Zurara in the Monument to the Discoveries, in Lisbon, Portugal.

=== Chronicle of discovery and conquest of guinea ===
The preface to the English version of The Chronicle of Discovery and Conquest of Guinea contains a full account of the life and writings of Azurara and cites all the authorities.

=== Chronicle of the henrican discoveries ===
Zurara's Crónica dos feitos da Guiné is the principal historical source for modern conception of Prince Henry the Navigator and the Henrican age of Portuguese discoveries (although Zurara only covers part of it, the period 1434–1448). Commissioned by Henry himself, Zurara's chronicle is openly hagiographic of the prince and reliant on his recollections. As a result, the reliability of Zurara's chronicles is considered suspect by modern historians. Nonetheless, having little else to draw upon, historians have had to rely heavily on Zurara.

Zurara claims to have based his account of the expeditions on a more detailed draft manuscript compiled by a certain "Antonio Cerveira". Alas, no copy of Cerveira's original account has ever been found. Zurara's own chronicle remained in manuscript form and hidden from the public eye for centuries. Indeed, until the publication of João de Barros's Primeira Década da Ásia in 1552, there were no published works about the Henrican discoveries, save for the two brief memoirs of Alvise Cadamosto (published originally in Italy in 1507).

João de Barros claimed to have constructed his 1552 account on the basis of a copy of Zurara's manuscript he found scattered in the archives. However, a little over a decade later, Damião de Góis (writing in 1567), announced that the Zurara manuscript had disappeared. A hunt for a copy of the manuscript began, but would turn up nothing for a while. The Spanish cleric Bartolomé de las Casas, writing in the 1540s, suggested he had a copy of Zurara, but that copy too was never tracked down.

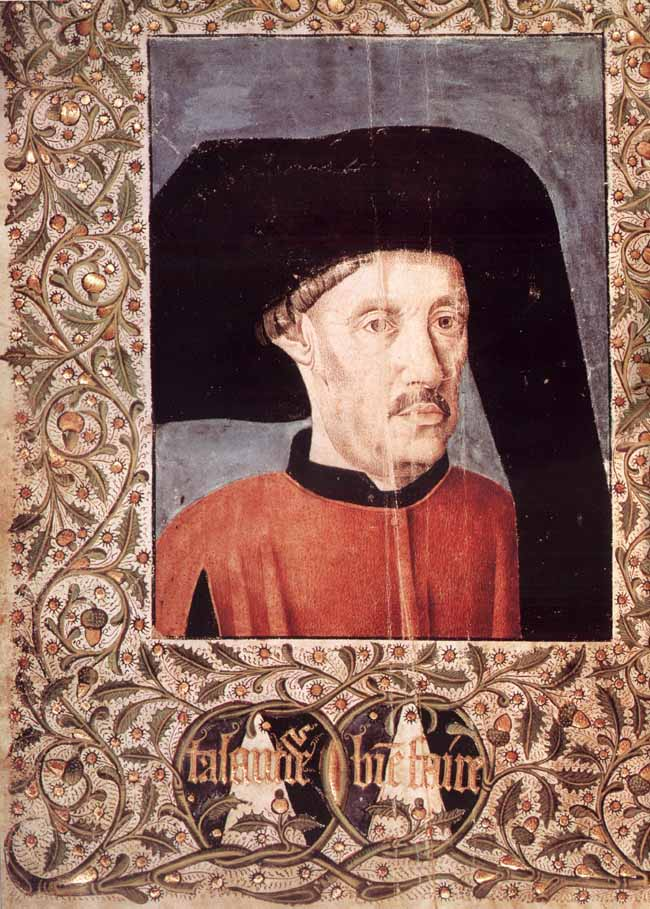
Frontispiece of Zurara's Crónica dos Feitos de Guiné (Paris codex)

It was only in 1839 that an intact and splendidly preserved manuscript copy of Zurara's Cronica was rediscovered in the Royal Library of Paris (now the Bibliothèque nationale de France) by Ferdinand Denis (how it ended up there is a mystery). Significantly, the Paris codex included a frontispiece with a portrait of a man with a thin moustache in a black Burgundian chaperon that was instantly assumed to be the physical image of Prince Henry the Navigator (there were no pictures of Henry before this; the Paris frontispiece became the basis of modern images of the prince, reproduced in countless books, paintings and monuments since). Luís António de Abreu e Lima (Viscount de Carreira), the Portuguese minister to France at the time, arranged for the first publication of Zurara's Cronica in 1841, with a preface and notes by Manuel Francisco de Macedo Leitão e Carvalhosa (Viscount of Santarém). The publication was a sensation, particularly as Portugal was then engaged in a diplomatic quarrel over recent Anglo-French colonial encroachments in West Africa where questions of priority of discovery were involved (to which Santarém contributed.)

A second manuscript copy was found shortly after, in 1845, by J.A. Schmeller in the Hof- und Staats-Bibliothek in Munich (Codex Hisp. 27), as part of a collection of miscellaneous accounts of Portuguese expeditions originally compiled in 1508 by a Lisbon-based German printer known as Valentinus Moravus (or in Portuguese, as "Valentim Fernandes"). However, this version contains only much-abridged extracts.

== Racism ==
In the 21st century, the work of Zurara has been re-examined for its foundational role in the development of cultural racism. Historian Ibram X. Kendi, in his 2016 book Stamped from the Beginning, argues that Zurara was the world's first cultural racist because his chronicle was the first to articulate a comprehensive defense of the Atlantic slave trade based on the concept of black inferiority.

Kendi posits that Zurara's writing was not the cause of the Portuguese slave trade but rather a product of it; Prince Henry's economic and political self-interest in the trade of enslaved Africans came first. Zurara was then tasked with creating a narrative to justify these policies. According to this view, Zurara's chronicle established a powerful and enduring justification for proto-racism by portraying enslaved Africans as "savages" who were being civilized and saved through their enslavement, thereby creating racist ideas to rationalize proto-racist policies.

=== Curse of Ham ===
It has also been posited that Zurara was likely the first European to attempt to provide a theological justification for the enslavement of Africans by appealing to the so-called Curse of Ham. The idea later spread widely that the divine curse against Noah's son was in fact the genesis of the Black race and their subsequent misfortune in the history of global expansion.
