= Torre do Tombo National Archive =

Portugal's national archives

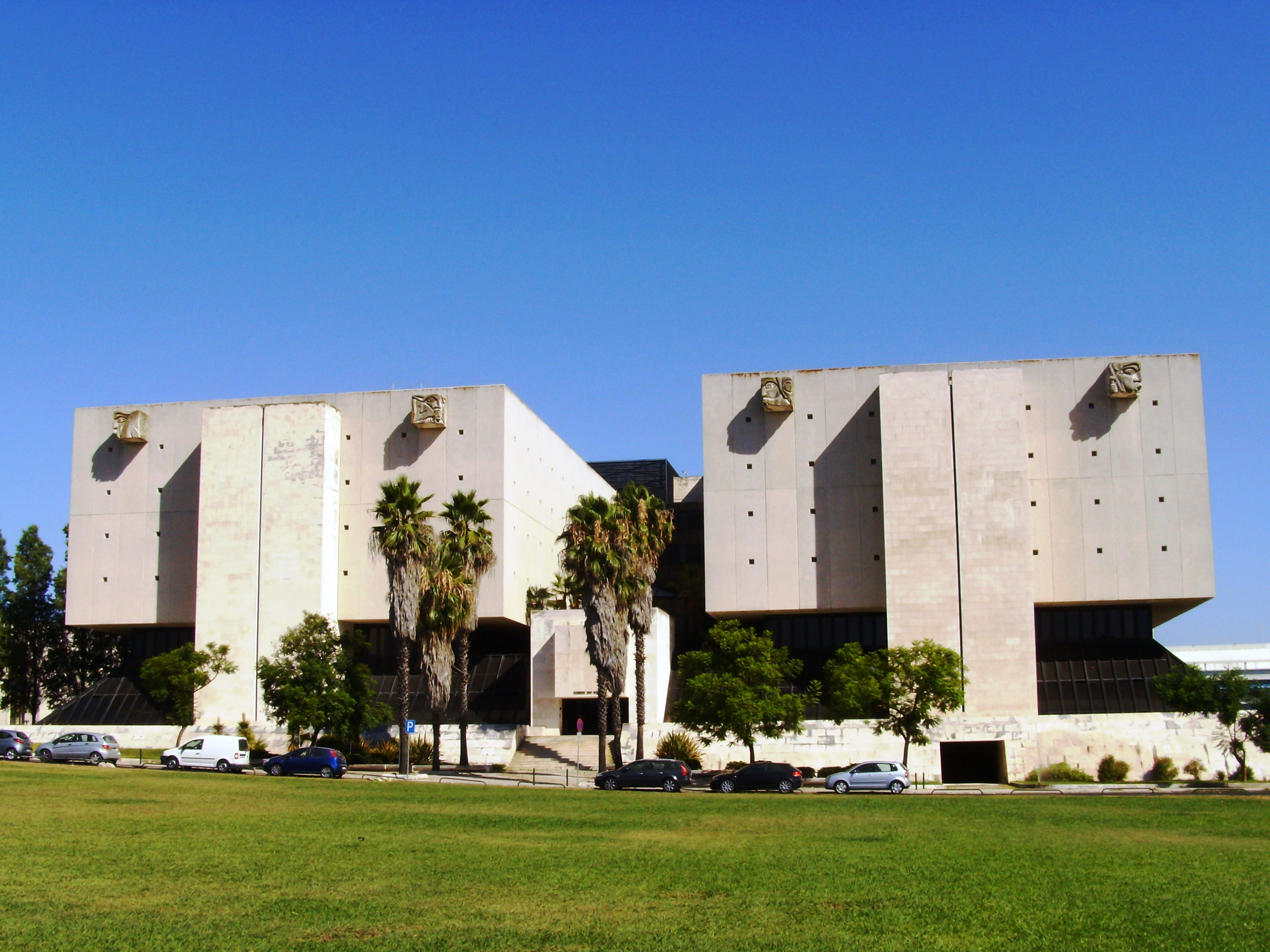
- Building exterior
- Interactive map of Torre do Tombo National Archive
- 38°45′16.6″N 9°9′23.4″W
- Alternative name: Torre do Tombo
- Location: Alameda da Universidade, 1649-010 Lisbon, Portugal
- Type: National archive
- Established: 1378; 648 years ago
- Affiliation: Directorate-General of the Book, Archives and Libraries
- Director of Services: Paulo Batista
- Collection size: 140 kilometres (87 mi) of physical records
- Period covered: 9th century - present

Building information
- Building: Building of the Torre do Tombo National Archive
- Architect: Arsénio Cordeiro
- Construction date: 1985
- Heritage status: Monument of public interest
- Website: Arquivo Nacional Torre do Tombo

The Torre do Tombo National Archive (Portuguese: Arquivo Nacional da Torre do Tombo), commonly known simply as the Torre do Tombo ([ˈtoʁɨ ðu ˈtõbu]; literally "Tower of the Tome") is the national archive of Portugal, located in Lisbon. Established in 1378, it is one of the oldest archival institutions in the world.

== History ==
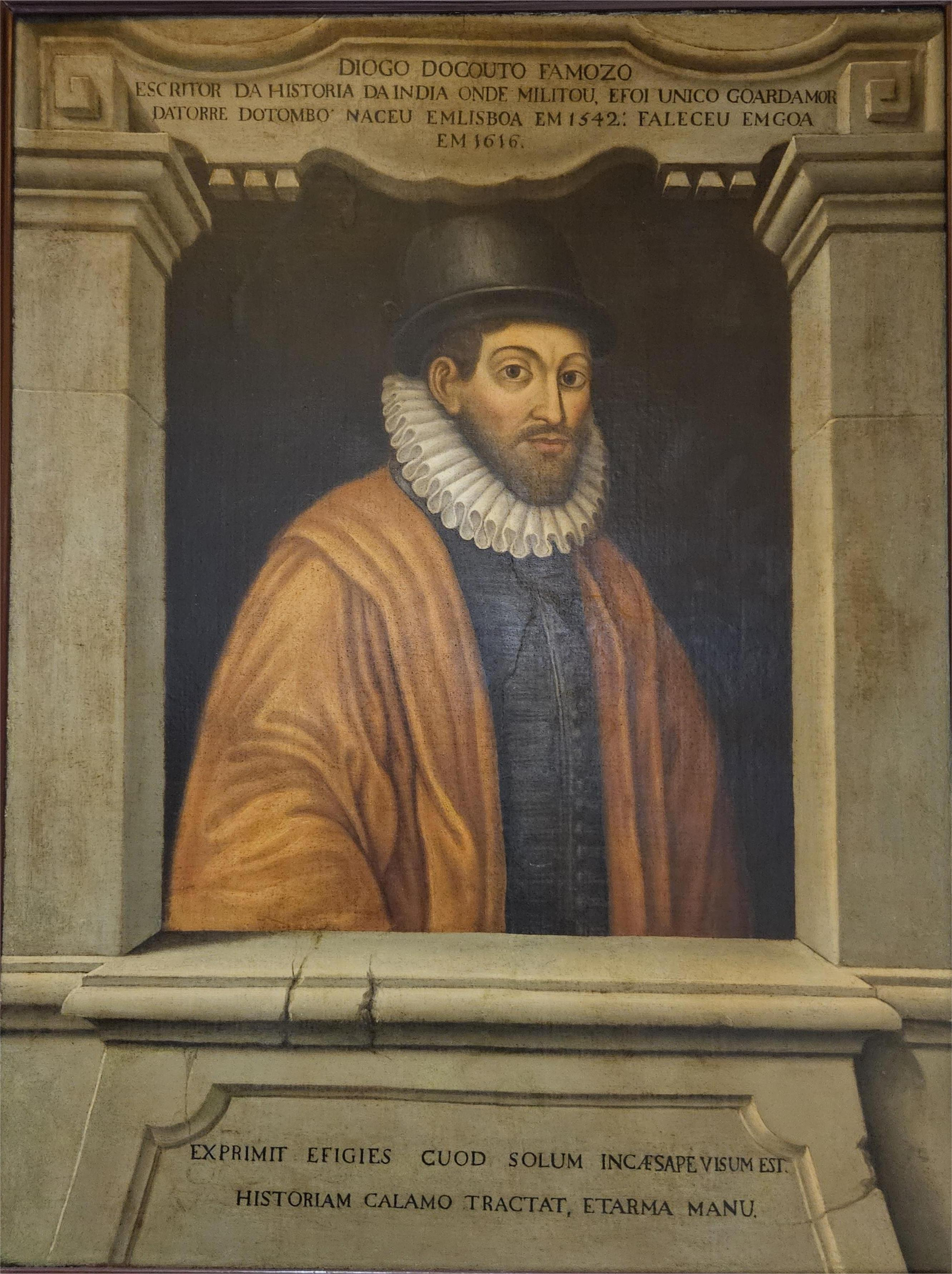
Diogo de Couto, a 16th century historian who served as Guarda-Mor ("High Guardian") of the Torre do Tombo's Portuguese India archives.

The archive is one of the oldest institutions in Portugal, since its installation in one of the towers of the castle in Lisbon, occurring during the reign of Ferdinand I, and likely in 1378 (the date where the first testimony originated). The archive served as the King's and nobilities' reference, with documents supporting the administration of the kingdom and overseas territories, and documenting the relationships between the State and foreign kingdoms.

This institution was maintained by the Royal Keeper, an office sometimes paired with the post of Chief Chronicler of the Kingdom. The first known Royal Keeper was João Annes de Almada, called "the Great", appointed by king John I, Ferdinand's successor, who separated the office from the court chancellor's. Both the offices of Chief Chronicler and Court Chancellor were extinguished in the 19th century, while the job of Royal Keeper was eventually transformed to Director of the National Archives after the establishment of the Portuguese Republic. António Baião was the last Royal Keeper and also the first Director of the renewed institution.

Following the events of the 1755 Lisbon earthquake, the then Keeper of the Royal Archives, Manuel da Maia, was responsible for saving the contents of the Torre do Tombo. At 75 years old, Maia personally led the safe-guarding team to São Jorge Castle, where the archives were located, and saved nearly 90,000 pieces, accumulated between 1161 and 1696. He ordered the construction of provisional barracks to store the contents of the archives and immediately made a request to Sebastião José de Carvalho e Melo, King Joseph I's prime-minister, for a new permanent home for the archives, which would eventually be granted to him in the form of the Convent of São Bento (which now houses the parliament of Portugal).

In 1982, a public tender was issued for the construction of the new Torre do Tombo archive building, and was won by the Ateliers Associados, represented by Arsénio Raposo Cordeiro, with M. Sheppard Cruz and A.N. de Almeida. The cornerstone was laid in 1985, in an official ceremony. The sculptor José Aurélio was invited to sculpt the gargoyles in 1987, which completed between 1988 and 1990 (in conjunction with mason José Rodrigues and builder Júlio Mesão. The original building was projected by architect Arsénio Cordeiro, in collaboration with architect António Barreiros Ferreira. It was inaugurated in 1990, and purposely built to receive the National Archive, whose vast collection had been archived since 1757 in the Monastery of São Bento da Saúde (today the São Bento Palace. The new archive inherited the name of the former Moorish tower of the Castle of São Jorge where documents from the kingdom were warehoused since 1378.

Before its inauguration on 21 December 1990, the archive that remained at the former-monastery was transferred to the new building. On 22 December 2010, the DRCLVTejo proposed classifying the building as a municipal property of interest, which was supported by the director of the IGESPAR. On 17 May 2011, an announcement was published regarding the process to classify the building, and by August, a formal request to make the building a municipal property of interest was formalized by DRCLVTejo. The National Council for Culture decided on 10 October 2011, that a classification was warranted, and provided their support. On 30 November 2011, a decision on the classification of this building was approved, and a Special Protection Zone was established.

== Collections ==
The Torre do Tombo safeguards twelve centuries of historical Portuguese guards, including documents that pre-date the Kingdom of Portugal, and others like the bull Manifestis Probatum, considered an important of UNESCO World Heritage. In addition, records include 36,000 documents recovered during the era of the Inquisition, many documents inscribed by the International and State Defense Police and the accord that admitted Portugal into the European Economic Community.

Examples of historic items held at the Torre do Tombo

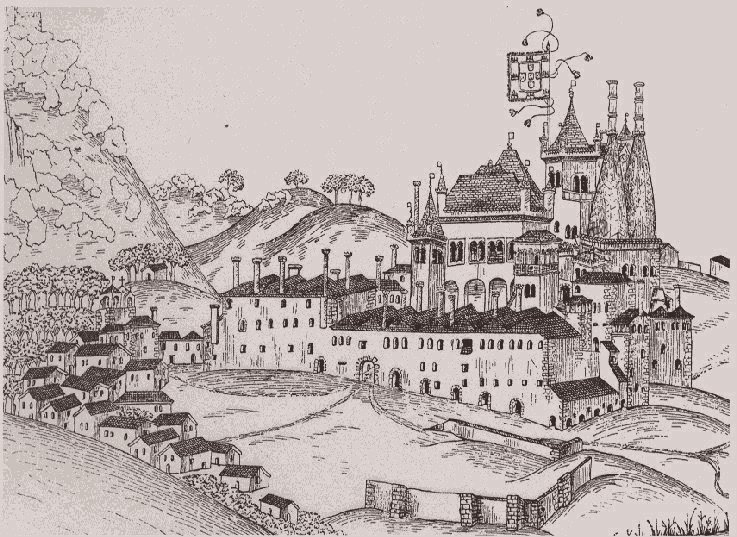
Book of Fortresses, 16th century

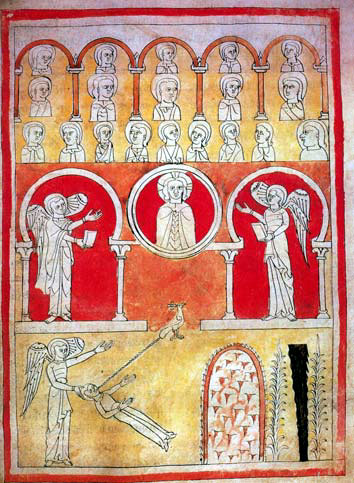
Apocalypse of Lorvão, 12th century

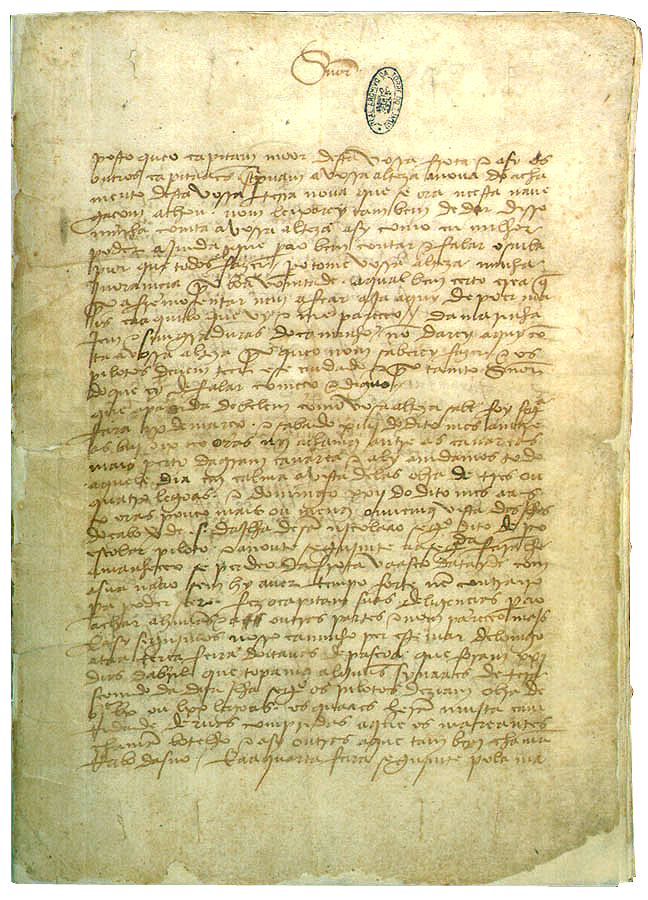
Letter of Pero Vaz de Caminha, 16th century

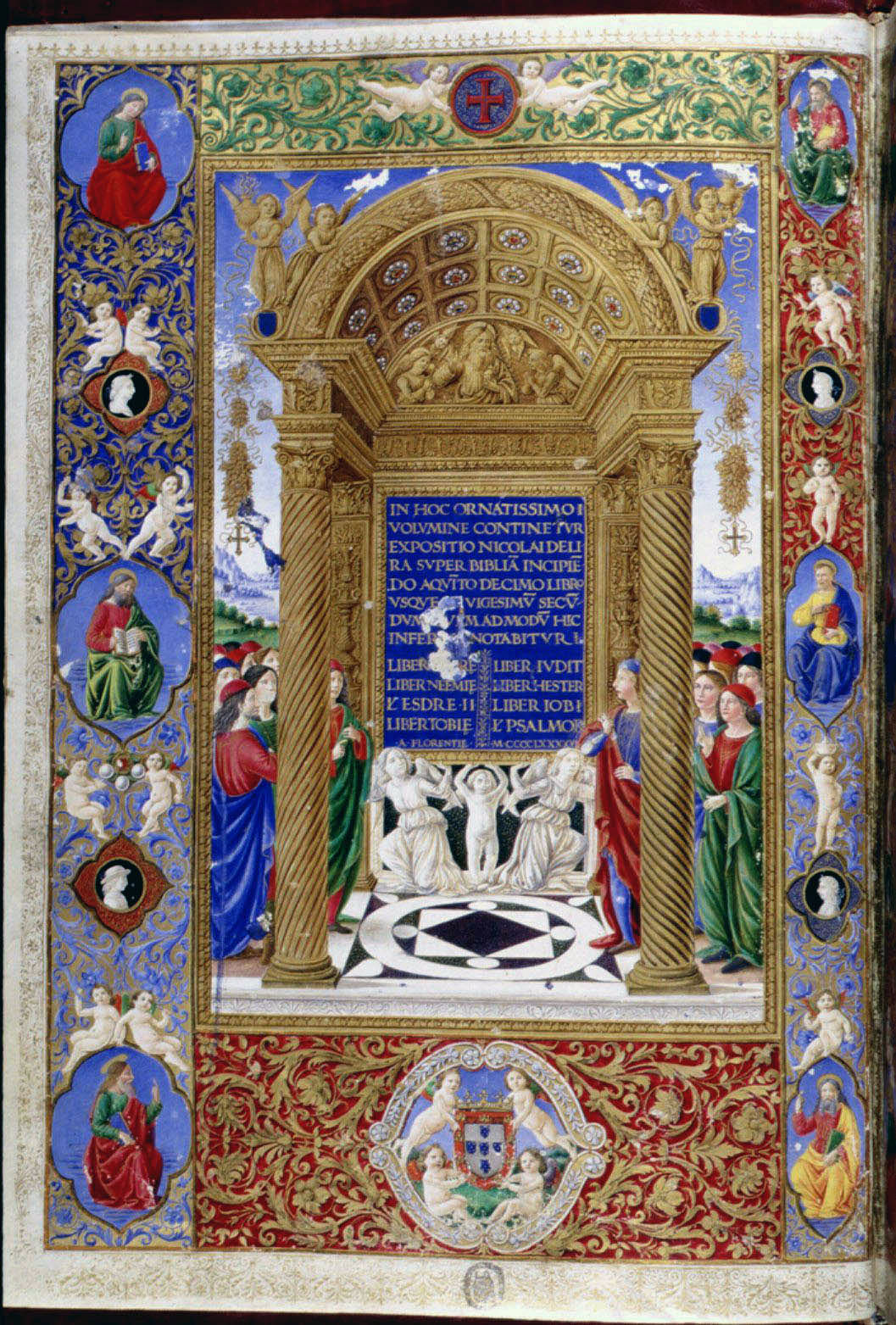
Jerónimos Bible, 15th century

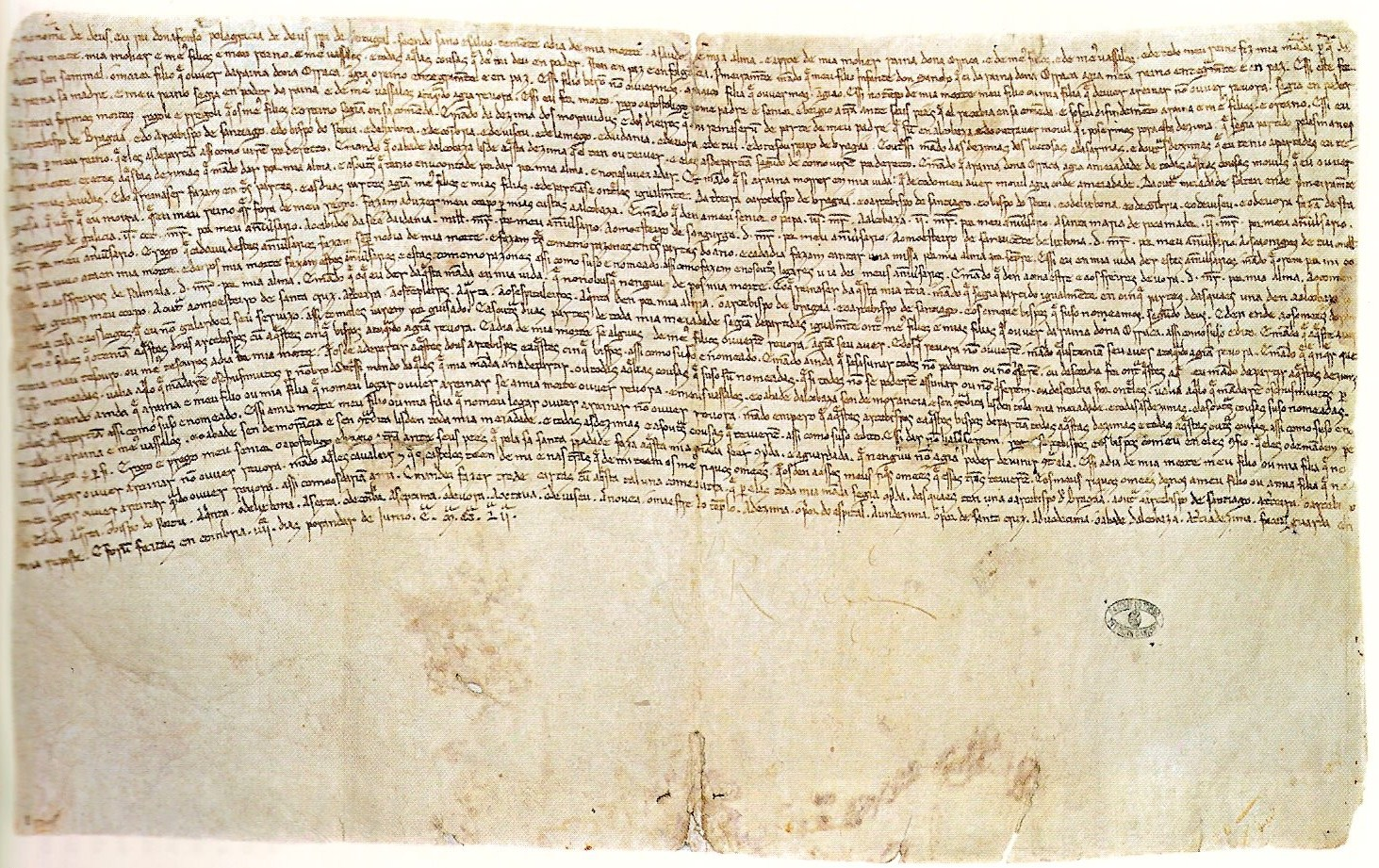
Will of Afonso II of Portugal, 13th century

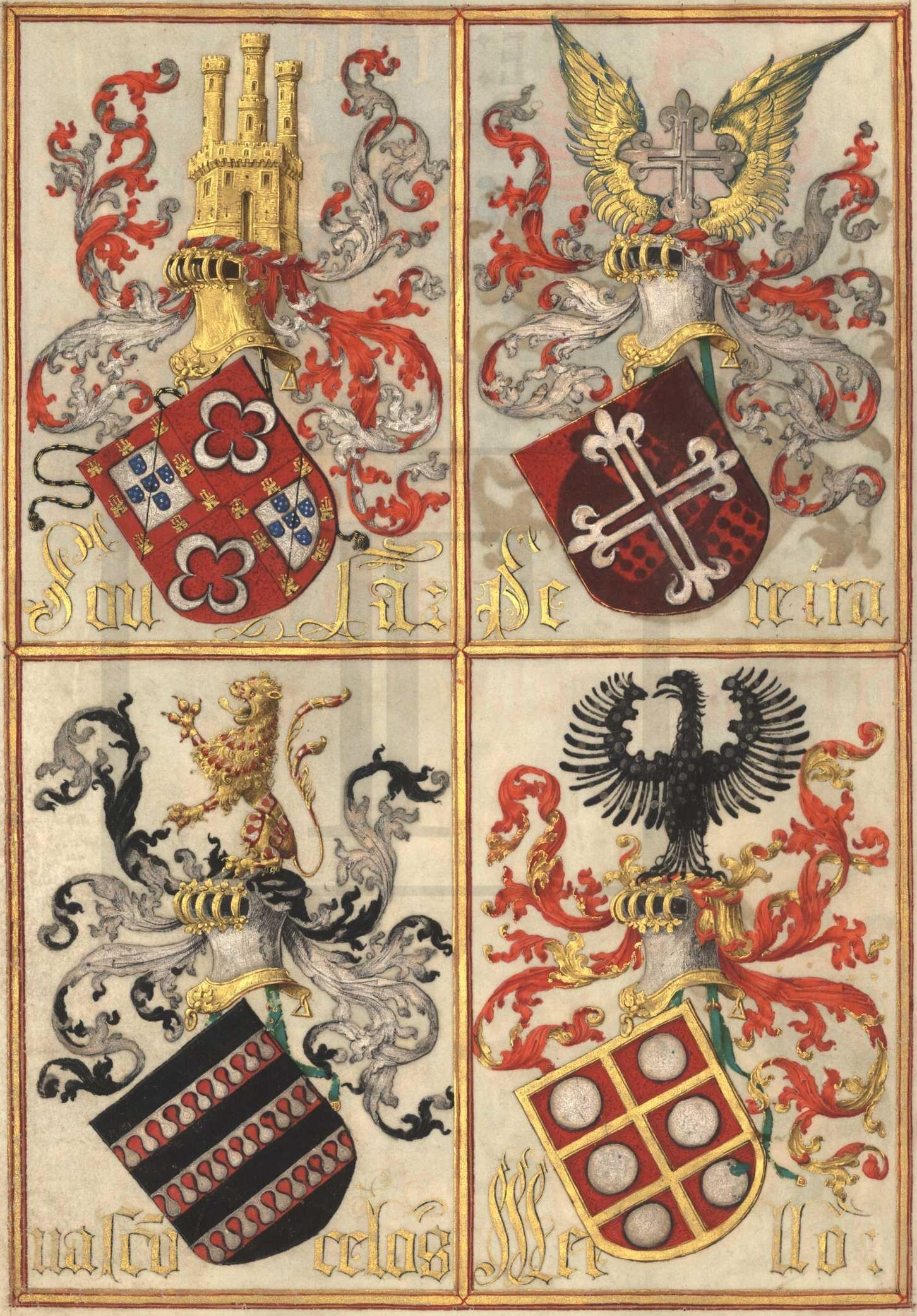
Livro da Nobreza, 16th century

Among the other significant collections at the archive are items relating to the Portuguese explorations and discoveries in Africa, Asia and Latin America. The Corpo Cronológico (Chronological Body), a collection of manuscripts on the Portuguese discoveries, was inscribed on UNESCO's Memory of the World Register in 2007 in recognition of its historical value "for acquiring knowledge of the political, diplomatic, military, economic and religious history of numerous countries at the time of the Portuguese Discoveries." Another item relating to the Portuguese discoveries, the letter of Pero Vaz de Caminha, was also inscribed on the Memory of the World Register in 2005. This letter is the first document describing the land and people of what became Brazil.

== Architecture ==
The imposing structure consists of two large units unified by a central body, forming an immense "H" plan. The two wings are supported by large bases that create a fortress-like structure, evocative of the large historic monuments that were constructed to last for an eternity, and to act as a symbols of preservation and guardianship of a collective memory. The building occupies an area of 11,265 square metres (121,260 ft^{2}) distributed over seven floors, with three floors used by technical rooms, reading rooms, an auditorium and exposition halls. The upper floors are used to shelter the 140 kilometres (87 mi) shelves for documents, with austere cement walls, with small, square fenestrations, that characterizes a safe-box.

Erected in the centre of each facade is a vertical body that acts as buttress, in the form of a "T" that reproduces the archives initials for "Torre do Tombo". The principal and rear facades (oriented to the south and north respectively) are surmounted by eight gargoyles, sculpted by José Aurélio, representing fundamentals elements from human history or important in the particular mission of the national archive. These include gargoyles that figure as the Guarda do Abecedário (Guard of the Alphabet), the Guarda das Ondas Hertzianas (Guard of Hertzian Waves), O Velho (The Old) and o Novo (The Young), the a Morte (The Death) and O Bem (The Good) and O Mal (The Evil); the gargoyles in the rear represent A Tragédia (The Tragedy) and A Comédia (The Comedy), A Guerra (The War) and A Paz (The Peace), the Guarda das Pedras (Guard of Stones) and the Guarda dos Papiros (Guard of Papyruses or Guard of the Scrolls).

== Gallery ==
=== Architecture ===
Exterior

Interior stairs

Interior ground floor

A model of the building

=== Gargoyles ===
==== Guardians ====
Guardian of the Stones

Guardian of the Papyri

Guardian of the Alphabet

Guardian of the Radio Waves

==== Dichotomies ====
The Young, the Old, and Death

Good and Evil

Tragedy and Comedy

War and Peace

== See also ==
- List of archives in Portugal
- Biblioteca Nacional de Portugal (National Library)
- List of national archives
